= Vajrapāramitā =

Bodhisattva of the Buddhist Pantheon

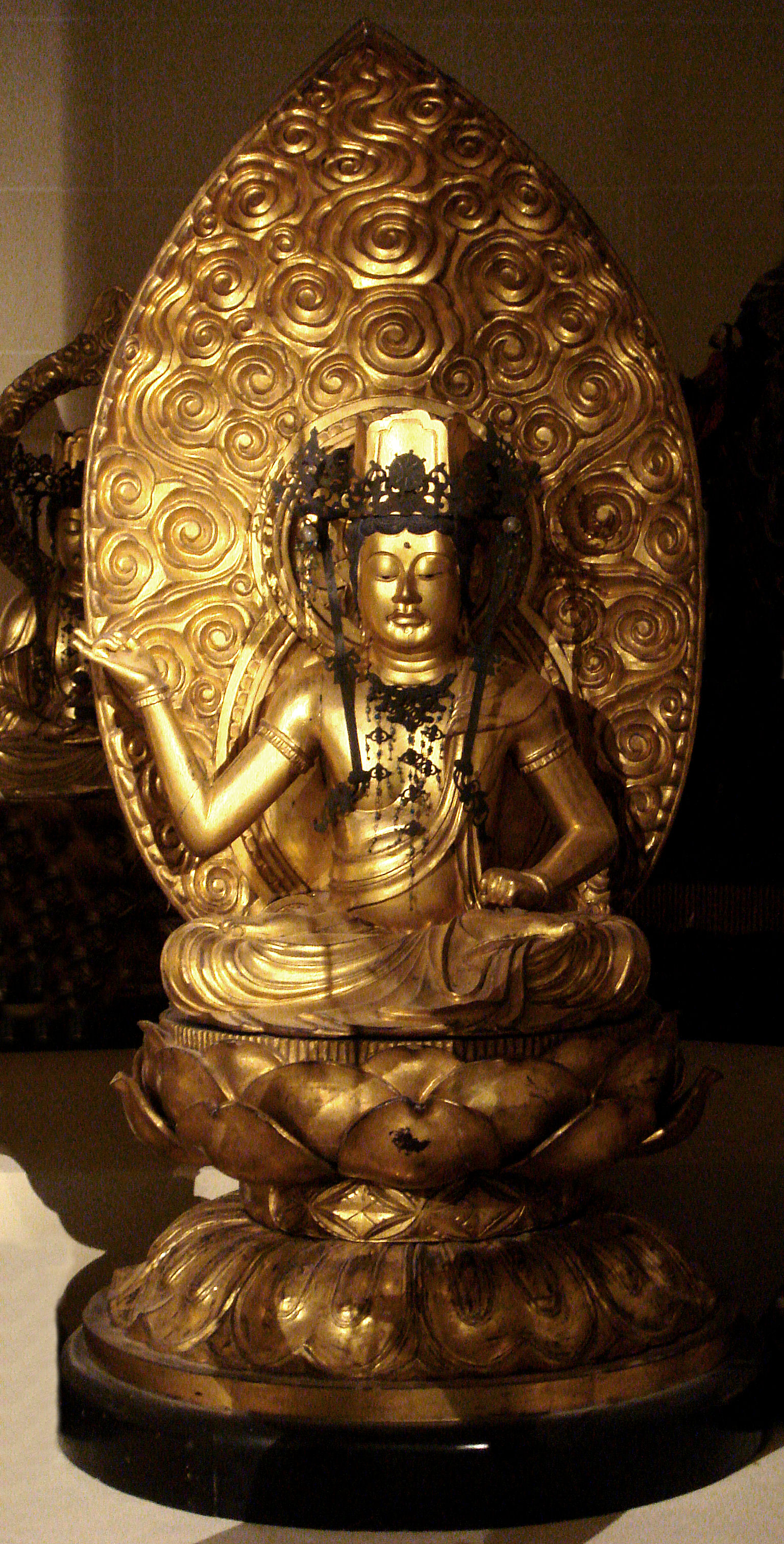
Kongo Haramitsu Bodhisattva

Vajraparamita (in Sanskrit), also Kongō-Haramitsu (金剛波羅蜜菩薩) is a Bodhisattva of the Buddhist Pantheon, belonging especially to the Esoteric Buddhism tradition of Vajrayana. Kongō-Haramitsu is one of the deities of the Five Mysteries of Vajrasattva, where it appears as one of the four Paramitas. Kongō-Haramitsu is also a central deity of the Buddhist Pantheon of Tō-ji Temple.
