= Fu Dashi =

Chinese Buddhist layman

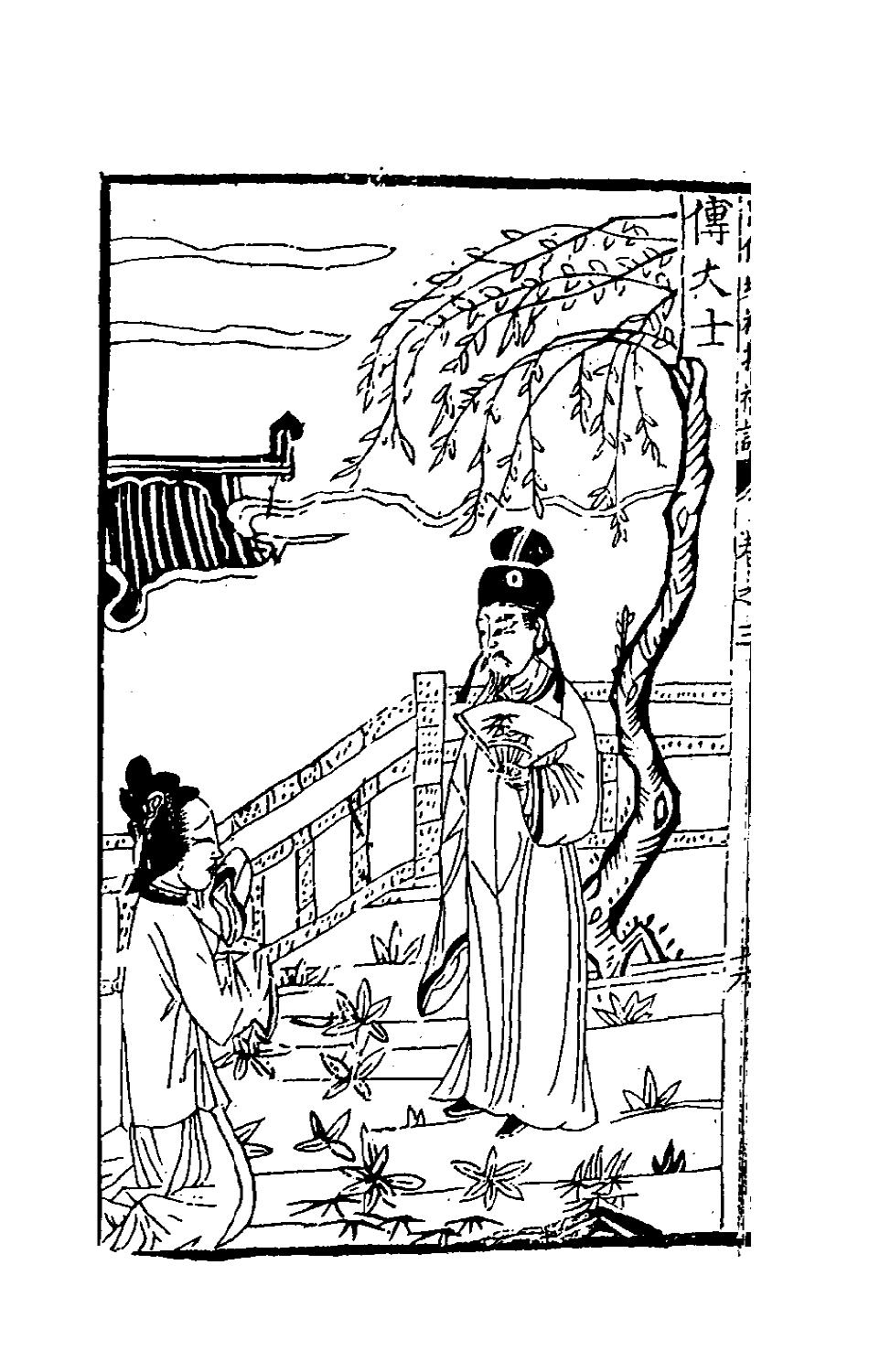
Engraving of Fu Dashi in the "Newly Engraved Figures to Supplement the Record of Searching for the Spirits" (Chinese: 新刻出像增補搜神記, pinyin: Xīnkè Chūxiàng Zēngbǔ Sōushén Jì)

Fu Dashi (Chinese: 傅大士; pinyin: Fù Dàshì, lit: "Mahāsattva Fu", 497 – 569) was a Chinese Buddhist layman who lived in Dongyang under the reign of Emperor Wu of Liang during the Northern and Southern Dynasties. In Chinese Buddhist tradition, he is popularly revered alongside Bodhidharma and Baozhi as the "Three Mahāsattvas of the Liang Dynasty" (Chinese: 梁代三大士; pinyin: Liángdài Sāndàshì).

In traditional Buddhist hagiographies of his life, Fu Dashi is recorded as having overseen the construction of Shuanglin Temple and compiling an early version of the Chinese Buddhist Canon. In the same Canon, he is credited as the author of the "Ode to the Diamond Sūtra" (Chinese: 金剛般若經來頌, pinyin: Jīngāng Bōrě Jīng Láisòng), a commentary on the Diamond Sūtra. According to some accounts, such as the “Chronicle of the Buddhas and Patriarchs” (Chinese: 佛祖統紀, pinyin: Fózǔ Tǒngjì), Fu Dashi implied that he was Maitreya Buddha and founded the Maitreya School during his lifetime. In addition, he is often credited as the inventor of the Chinese revolving bookcases, or zhuanlunzang (Chinese: 轉輪藏; pinyin: Zhuànlún zàng) that are often found in the Zangjing Ge of Chinese Buddhist monasteries.

Fu Dashi also appears in certain Chan Buddhist gong'ans. One example is case 67 in the Blue Cliff Record, where Fu Dashi is recorded as having been invited to speak by Emperor Wu. According to this account, Fu Dashi stepped up to the lectern, struck it a blow with his staff, and then returned to his seat without speaking a word.
