= Bhadrapāla =

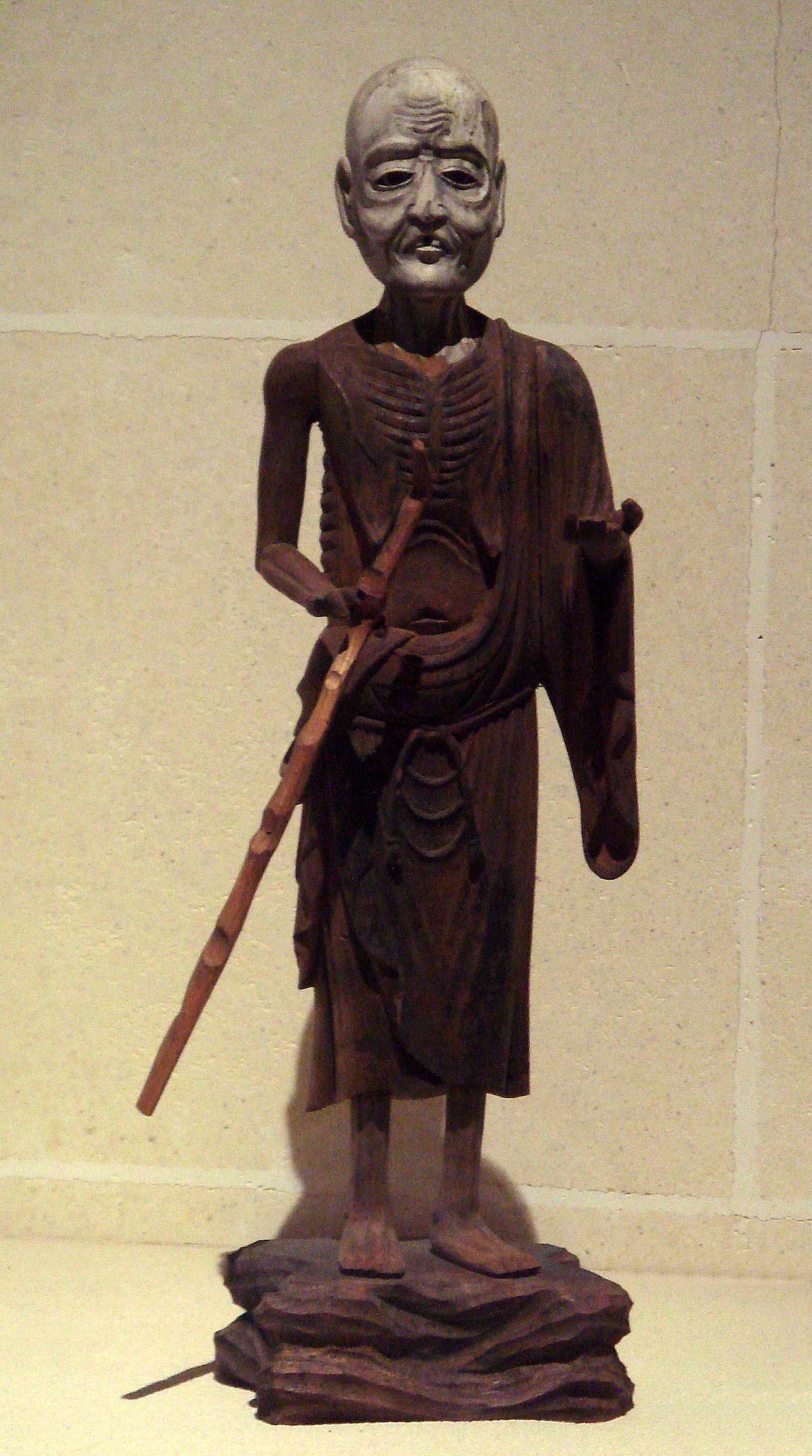
- Statuette of Battabara at the Musee Guimet
- Chinese: 賢護; Pinyin: xiánhù; 跋陀波羅; Pinyin: bátuóbōluó
- Japanese: 跋陀婆羅; romaji: baddabara, battabara, batsudahara; 賢護; romaji: kengo
- Tibetan: བཟང་སྐྱོང; THL: bzang skyong

Information
- Venerated by: Mahayana Buddhists

Bhadrapāla ("Auspicious Protector", Standard Tibetan: བཟང་སྐྱོང, romanized: bzang skyong; Chinese: 賢護, romanized: xiánhù; 跋陀波羅, bátuóbōluó; Japanese: 跋陀婆羅, romanized: baddabara, battabara, batsudahara; 賢護, kengo) is a lay bodhisattva in Mahayana Buddhism. He is recognized as one of the eight prominent bodhisattvas who pledged to safeguard and promote the true Dharma (saddharma) during the period of Dharma decline. Additionally, he is mentioned in the Dazhidulun as one of sixteen significant bodhisattvas who retained their status as householders.

In the Mahāratnakūṭa Sūtra, Bhadrapāla is described as the son of a prosperous merchant (gṛhapati), living a life of luxury. The Pratyutpannasamādhi-sūtra portrays him alongside 500 accompanying bodhisattvas, seeking guidance from the Buddha on acquiring wisdom as vast as the ocean.

The Lotus Sūtra, specifically in its twentieth chapter, recounts Bhadrapāla's earlier life, where he disrespected the Buddha, resulting in his descent into Avīci hell for a thousand kalpas. After enduring this punishment and expiating his karmic offenses, he eventually encountered the Buddha again and embraced his teachings. He is also listed among the 80,000 bodhisattvas who attended the Lotus Sūtra'' assembly at Vulture Peak.

Bhadrapāla ultimately attained Buddhahood through meditative contemplation of water. Referencing this event, the Śūraṅgama Sūtra mentions that his enlightenment occurred in a bathhouse. This association led to his enshrinement in the bathhouses of Chinese Chan monasteries, and in Japan, some Buddhist traditions regarded him as the patron deity of temple bathhouses. Figurines of Battabara are also kept in bathrooms in Japanese Zen monasteries.
