= List of bodhisattvas =

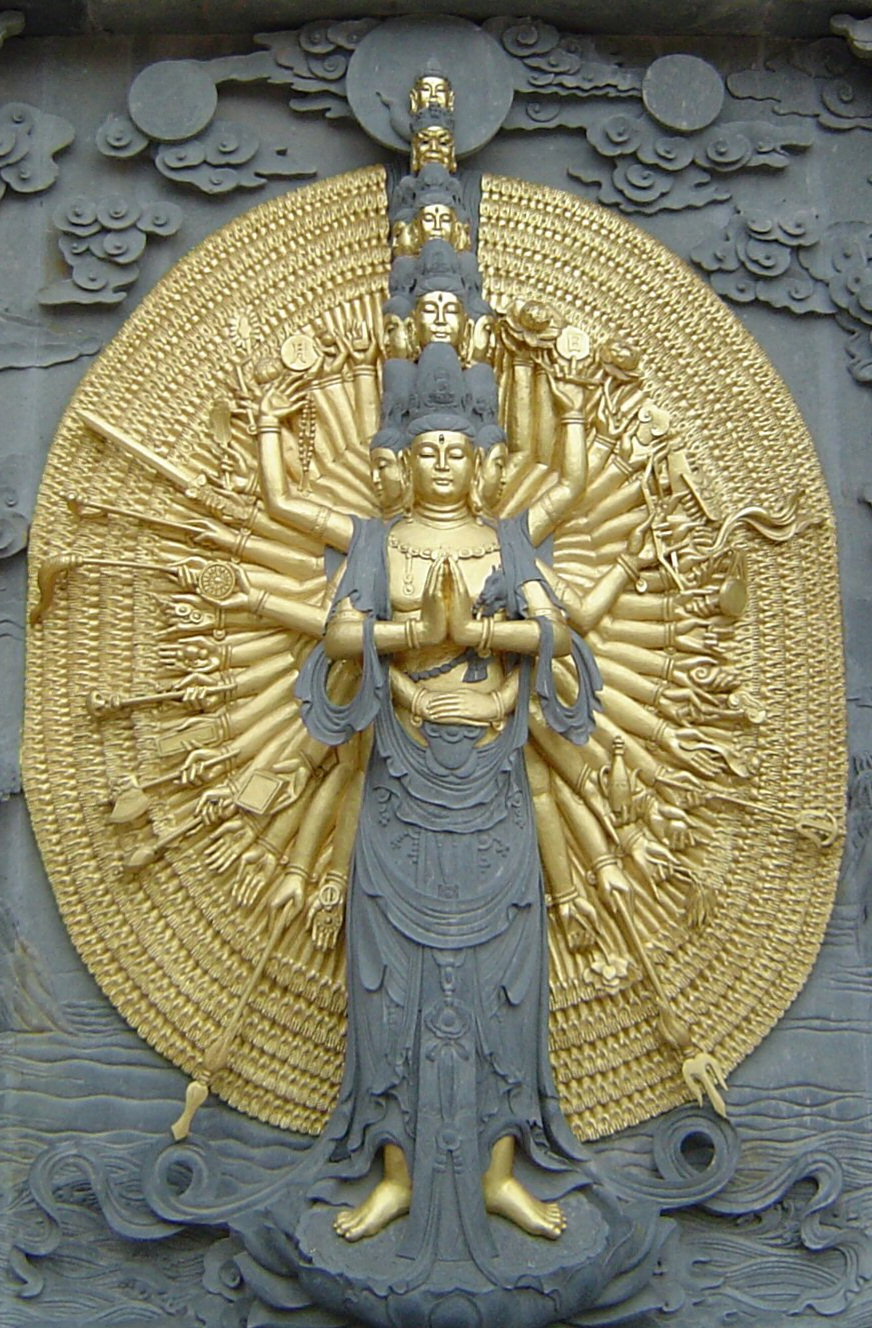
Relief image of the bodhisattva Avalokiteśvara from Mount Jiuhua, Anhui, China

In Buddhist thought, a bodhisattva (Hindi, Devanagari: बोधिसत्व; Burmese: ဗောဓိသတ်; Sinhalese:බෝධිසත්ව; Chinese: 菩薩; pinyin: púsà; Japanese pronunciation: bosatsu; Korean pronunciation: bosal; Vietnamese: bồ tát; Khmer: ពោធិសត្វ; Thai: โพธิสัตว์; Tibetan: སངས་རྒྱས་ཀྱི་མཚན་གཤམ་གསལ།) is a being who is dedicated to achieving complete Buddhahood. Conventionally, the term is applied to beings with a high degree of enlightenment. Bodhisattva literally means a "bodhi (enlightenment) being" in Pali and Sanskrit. Mahayana practitioners have historically lived in many other countries that are now predominantly Hindu or Muslim; remnants of reverence for bodhisattvas has continued in some of these regions.

The following is a non-exhaustive list of bodhisattvas primarily respected in Buddhism.

== Primary Bodhisattvas ==
- Ākāśagarbha

Chinese: 虛空藏; pinyin: Xūkōngzàng; Japanese pronunciation: Kokūzō; Korean: 허공장; Vietnamese: Hư Không Tạng, Khmer: អាកាសគភ៌; Thai: พระอากาศครรภโพธิสัตว์; sinhalese:ආකාශගර්භ;Tibetan: ནམ་མཁའི་སྙིང་པོ།, THL: Namkha'i Nyingpo) is a bodhisattva who is associated with the great element (mahābhūta) of Space (ākāśa).

- Avalokiteśvara (Padmapani)

(Burmese: လောကနတ်; Chinese: 觀音; pinyin: Guanyin; Japanese pronunciation: Kannon; Korean: 관음; Vietnamese: Quán Thế Âm, Khmer:អវលោកិតេស្វរៈ, អវលោកេស្វរៈ, លោកេស្វរៈ; Sinhalese:අවලෝකිතේශ්වර,Thai: พระอวโลกิเตศวรโพธิสัตว์;.Tibetan: སྤྱན་རས་གཟིགས་, THL: Chenrézik)

The bodhisattva of Great compassion, the listener of the world's cries who uses skillful means to come to their aid; the most universally acknowledged bodhisattva in Mahayana Buddhism, also appears in Theravada and Vajrayana Buddhism. This bodhisattva gradually became identified predominantly as female in East Asian Buddhism and its name may originally have been Avalokitāśvara.

- Kṣitigarbha

(Chinese: 地藏; pinyin: Dìzáng; Japanese pronunciation: Jizō; Korean: 지장; Vietnamese: Địa Tạng, Khmer: ក្សិតិគភ៌; Mongolian: Сайенинбу; sinhalese:ක්ශිතිගර්භ; Thai: พระกษิติครรภโพธิสัตว์; Tibetan: ས་ཡི་སྙིང་པོ, THL: Sayi Nyingpo).

Kṣitigarbha is a bodhisattva primarily revered in East Asian Buddhism and usually depicted as a Buddhist monk. His name may be translated as "Earth Treasury", "Earth Store", "Earth Matrix", or "Earth Womb". Kṣitigarbha is known for his vow to take responsibility for the instruction of all beings in the six worlds between the death of Gautama Buddha and the rise of Maitreya, as well as his vow not to achieve Buddhahood until all hells are emptied. He is therefore often regarded as the bodhisattva of hell-beings, as well as the guardian of children and patron deity of deceased children in Japanese culture.

- Mahāsthāmaprāpta

(Chinese: 大勢至; pinyin: Dàshìzhì; Japanese pronunciation: Daiseishi; Korean: 대세지; Vietnamese: Đại Thế Chí; Khmer: មហាស្ថាមប្រាប្ត; sinhalese:මහාස්ථාමප්‍රාප්ත; Thai: พระมหาสถามปราปต์โพธิสัตว์; Tibetan: Tibetan: མཐུ་ཆེན་ཐོབ, THL: Thuchen Thöb)

Mahāsthāmaprāpta (Korean: Daeseji) is a mahāsattva representing the power of wisdom, often depicted in a trinity with Amitābha and Bodhisattva Avalokiteśvara, especially in Pure Land Buddhism. His name literally means "Arrival of the great strength".

- Maitreya, (Pali: Metteyya)

In some Buddhist texts such as the Amitabha Sutra and the Lotus Sutra, he is referred to as Ajita. Burmese: အရိမေတ္တယျ; Chinese: 彌勒; pinyin: Mílè; Japanese pronunciation: Miroku; Korean: 미륵; Vietnamese: Di-lặc, Khmer: សិអារ្យមេត្រី, អរិយមេត្តយ្យ; Mongolian: Майдар, Асралт; Sinhalese:මෛත්‍රීය බුදුන්; Thai: พระศรีอริยเมตไตรย; Tibetan: བྱམས་པ་, THL: Jampa).

According to Buddhism, Maitreya is regarded as the future buddha in "Bhadrakalpa" (Auspicious aeon). In Buddhist tradition, Maitreya is a bodhisattva who will appear on Earth in the future, achieve complete enlightenment, and teach the pure dharma. According to scriptures, Maitreya will be a successor to the present Buddha, Gautama Buddha. The prophecy of the arrival of Maitreya refers to a time in the future when the dharma will have been forgotten by most on the terrestrial world. This prophecy is found in the canonical literature of all major schools of Buddhism. Maitreya has also been adopted for his millenarian role by many non-Buddhist religions in the past such as the White Lotus as well as by modern new religious movements such as Yiguandao.

- Mañjuśrī

(Chinese: 文殊; pinyin: Wénshū; Japanese pronunciation: Monju; Korean: 문수; Vietnamese: Văn Thù, Khmer: មញ្ចុស្រី; Mongolian: Зөөлөн эгшигт;sinhalese:මංජුශ්‍රී; Thai: พระมัญชุศรีโพธิสัตว์; Tibetan: འཇམ་དཔལ་དབྱངས།, THL: Jampelyang)

Mañjuśrī is a bodhisattva associated with prajñā (transcendent wisdom) in Mahayana Buddhism. In Tibetan Buddhism, he is also a yidam. His name means "Gentle Glory". Mañjuśrī is also known by the fuller Sanskrit name of Mañjuśrīkumārabhūta, literally "Mañjuśrī, Still a Youth" or, less literally, "Prince Mañjuśrī".

- Samantabhadra

Chinese: 普賢菩薩; pinyin: Pǔxián; Japanese pronunciation: Fugen; Korean: 보현; Vietnamese: Phổ Hiền, Khmer: សមន្តភទ្រ; Mongolian: Хамгаар Сайн; Sinhalese: සමන්තභද්‍ර; Tibetan: ཀུན་ཏུ་བཟང་པོ, THL: Küntu Zangpo, Thai: พระสมันตภัทรโพธิสัตว์}

Samantabhadra, Universal Worthy is associated with practice and meditation. Together with the Buddha and Mañjuśrī, he forms the Shakyamuni trinity in Buddhism. He is the patron of the Lotus Sutra and, according to the Avatamsaka Sutra, made the ten great vows which are the basis of a bodhisattva mahasattva. In China, Samantabhadra is associated with action, whereas Mañjuśrī is associated with prajñā. In Japan, Samantabharda is often venerated by the Tendai and in Shingon Buddhism, and as the protector of the Lotus Sutra by Nichiren Buddhism.

- Vajrapāṇi, (Pali: Vajirapāṇi)

(Chinese: 金剛手; pinyin: Jīngāngshǒu; Japanese pronunciation: Kongōshu; Korean: 금강수; Vietnamese: Kim cương thủ, Khmer: វជ្របាណិ; sinhalese: වජ්‍රපානි; Thai: พระวัชรปาณีโพธิสัตว์; Tibetan: ཕྱག་ན་རྡོ་རྗེ་, THL: Chakna Dorjé)

Vajrapāṇi (Sanskrit, "Vajra in [his] hand") is one of the earliest-appearing bodhisattvas in Mahayana Buddhism. He is the protector and guide of Gautama Buddha and rose to symbolize the Buddha's power.

Vajrapāṇi is extensively represented in Buddhist iconography as one of the three protective deities surrounding the Buddha. Each of them symbolizes one of the Buddha's virtues: Mañjuśrī manifests all the Buddhas' wisdom, Avalokiteśvara manifests all the Buddhas' compassion and Vajrapāṇi manifests all the Buddhas' power as well as the power of all five tathāgatas. Vajrapāṇi is one of the earliest dharmapalas mentioned in the Pāli Canon as well as be worshiped in the Shaolin Monastery, in Tibetan Buddhism and in Pure Land Buddhism, where he is known as Mahasthamaprapta and forms a triad with Amitābha and Avalokiteśvara.

Manifestations of Vajrapāṇi can also be found in many Buddhist temples in China, Korea and Japan as dharma protectors called the Niō (仁王) or "Benevolent Kings". They are two wrathful and muscular guardians of the Buddha standing today at the entrance of many Buddhist temples in East Asian Buddhism and are said to be dharmapala manifestations of Vajrapāṇi. They are also seen as a manifestations of Mahasthamaprapta in Pure Land Buddhism and as Vajrasattva in Tibetan Buddhism. In some texts, he is also described as the manifestation of Sakka, the ruler of Tavatimsa Devas.

According to Japanese tradition, they traveled with Gautama Buddha to protect him, reminiscent of Vajrapāṇi's role in the Ambaṭṭha Sutta of the Pali Canon. Within the generally pacifist tradition of Buddhism, stories of dharmapalas justified the use of physical force to protect cherished values and beliefs against evil. Vajrapāṇi is also associated with Acala, who is venerated as Fudō-Myō in Japan, where he is serenaded as the holder of the vajra.

== Classification ==
=== Four Great Bodhisattvas ===
There are several lists of four Bodhisattvas according to scripture and local tradition.

Popular Chinese Buddhism generally lists the following, as they are associated with the Four Sacred Mountains:

- Avalokiteśvara
- Kṣitigarbha
- Mañjuśrī
- Samantabhadra

The Womb Realm Mandala of Esoteric Buddhism provides another enumeration. These bodhisattvas are featured in the Eight Petal Hall in the center of the mandala.

- Samantabhadra
- Mañjuśrī
- Avalokiteśvara
- Maitreya

The Avataṃsaka Sūtra mentions four bodhisattvas, each of whom expounds a portion of the Fifty-two Stages of Bodhisattva Practice.

- Dharmaprajñā
- Guṇavana
- Vajraketu
- Vajragarbha

The Lotus Sutra provides a list of bodhisattvas that are the leaders of the Bodhisattvas of the Earth.

- Viśiṣṭacāritra
- Anantacāritra
- Viśuddhacāritra
- Supratiṣṭhitacāritra

=== Five Great Bodhisattvas ===
Chapter 7 of the Humane King Sutra provides an enumeration of five bodhisattvas, known as the "Five Bodhisattvas of Great Power (五大力菩薩)." There are two Chinese translations of this text, each providing an entirely different name to these figures. Their association with the cardinal directions also differs between versions. They are as follows:

Old translation (Kumaravija)	Direction	New translation (Amoghavajra)	Direction
無量力吼	West	Vajrapāramitā (金剛波羅蜜多)	Central
雷電吼	North	Vajrayakṣa (金剛夜叉)	North
無畏方吼	East	Vajratīkṣṇa (金剛利)	West
龍王吼	South	Vajraratna (金剛宝)	South
金剛吼	Central	Vajrapāṇi (金剛手)	East

=== Ten Bodhisattvas ===
Ten Bodhisattas refer to ten future Buddhas as successors of Shakyamuni (Gautama) Buddha, in the following order. They are introduced as:

"Metteyyo Uttamo Rāmo, Paseno Kosalobibū, Dīghasoṇīca Caṅkīca, Subo, Todeyya Brahmano. Nāḷāgirī Pālileyyo, Bhodhisatthā imedasa anukkamena sabhodiṁ, pāpuṇissanti nāgate".

- The noble Maitreya Buddha
- King Uttararama
- King Pasenadi of Kosala
- Abhibhū
- Dīghasoṇī
- Caṅkī (Candanī)
- Subha
- A Brahmin named, Todeyya
- An elephant named, Nāḷāgirī
- The king of elephants, named Pālileyya

=== Sixteen Bodhisattvas ===
The Niṣpannayogāvalī provides a list of bodhisattvas known as the "Sixteen Honored Ones of the Auspicious Aeon." They also appear in a Sutra with the same title (賢劫十六尊). They are as follows, along with their respective associated directions:

East	South	West	North
Maitreya; Amoghadarśana; Sarvāpāyajaha; Sarvaśokatamonirghātana	Gandhahastin; Śauraya; Gaganagañja; Jñānaketu	Amitaprabha; Bhadrapāla; Jālinīprabha; Candraprabha	Akṣayamati; Pratibhānakūṭa; Vajragarbha; Samantabhadra

Another set of sixteen are known as the "Sixteen Great Bodhisattvas" and make up a portion of the Diamond Realm Mandala. They are associated with the Buddhas of the cardinal directions.

Akṣobhya (East)	Ratnasaṃbhava (South)	Amitābha (West)	Amoghasiddhi (North)
Vajrasattva; Vajrarāga; Vajrarāja; Vajrasādhu	Vajraratna; Vajraketu; Vajrateja; Vajrahāsa	Vajradharma; Vajrahetu; Vajratīkṣṇa; Vajrabhāṣa	Vajrakarma; Vajrayakṣa; Vajrarakṣa; Vajrasaṃdhi

=== Twenty-five Bodhisattvas ===
According to the Sūtra on Ten Methods of Rebirth in Amitābha Buddha's Land (十往生阿彌陀佛國經), those people who are devoted to attaining rebirth in the Western Pure Land are protected by a great number of bodhisattvas. Twenty-five of them are given by name:

- Avalokiteśvara
- Mahāsthāmaprāpta
- Bhaiṣajyarāja
- Bhaiṣajyasamudgata
- Samantabhadra
- Dharmeśvara
- Siṃhanāda
- Dhāraṇī
- Ākāśagarbha
- Guṇagarbha
- Ratnagarbha
- Vajragarbha
- Vajra
- Girisāgaramati
- Raśmiprabharāja
- Avataṃsakarāja
- Gaṇaratnarāja
- Candraprabharāja
- Divākararāja
- Samādhirāja
- Samādhīśvararāja
- Maheśvararāja
- Śuklahastarāja
- Mahātejarāja
- Anantakāya

== Misc ==
- Padmasambhāva

Tibetan: པདྨ་འབྱུང་གནས།, THL: Pemajungné, Mongolian: ловон Бадмажунай, Chinese: 莲花生大士; pinyin: Liánhuāshēng

Padmasambhāva "Lotus-Born", also known as Guru Rinpoche, is a literary character of terma, an emanation of Amitābha that is said to appear to tertöns in visionary encounters and a focus of Tibetan Buddhist practice, particularly in the Nyingma school.

- Sangharama

(Chinese: 伽藍; pinyin: Qiélán; Vietnamese: Già Lam)

Only revered in Chinese Buddhism and Taoism, Sangharama refer to a group of devas who guard viharas and the faith, but the title is usually referring to the legendary Chinese military general Guan Yu, who became a dharmapala through becoming a Buddhist and making vows.

- Sitātapatrā

(Chinese: 白傘蓋佛頂; pinyin: Bái Sǎngài Fúdǐng; Japanese pronunciation: Byakusangai Bucchō; Korean: 시타타파트라), Tibetan: གདུགས་དཀར།, Mongolian: Цагаан шүхэрт)

Sitātapatrā "the White Parasol" is a protector against supernatural danger. She is venerated in both Mahayana and Vajrayana traditions. She is also known as Uṣṇīṣa Sitatapatra. Sitātapatrā is a powerful independent deity as she was emanated by Gautama Buddha from his uṣṇīṣa. Whoever practices her mantra will be reborn in Amitābha's pure land as well as gaining protection against supernatural danger and black magic.

- Skanda

Chinese: 韋馱; pinyin: Wéituó; Japanese pronunciation: Idaten; Korean: 위타천; Vietnamese: Vi Đà, Tibetan: གདོང་དྲུག་, THL: Dongdruk, Mongolian: Арван Хоёр Нууд) Skanda is regarded as a devoted guardian of viharas and the Buddhist teachings. He is the leader of the twenty-four celestial guardian deities mentioned in the Golden Light Sutra. In Chinese temples, Skanda faces the statue of the Buddha in the main shrine. In others, he is on the far right of the main shrine, whereas on the left is his counterpart, Sangharama, personified as the historical general Guan Yu. In Chinese sutras, his image is found at the end of the sutra, a reminder of his vow to protect and preserve the teachings.

- Supuṣpacandra

Mentioned in Shantideva's Bodhisattvacaryāvatāra.

- Sūryaprabha

(Ch: 日光, Rìguāng, Kr. Ilgwang, Jp: Nikkō) One of two attendants of Bhaisajyaguru, together with Candraprabha.

- Candraprabha

(Ch: 月光, Yuèguāng, Kr. Wolgwang, Jp: Gakkō) One of two attendants of Bhaisajyaguru, together with Sūryaprabha.

- Tara

(Ch. 多羅, Duō luó) Female bodhisattva, or set of bodhisattvas, in Tibetan Buddhism. She represents the virtues of success in work and achievements. Also a manifestation of Avalokiteśvara.

- Vasudhārā

Vasudhārā whose name means "stream of gems" in Sanskrit, is the bodhisattva of wealth, prosperity, and abundance. She is popular in many Buddhist countries and is a subject in Buddhist legends and art. Originally an Indian bodhisattva, her popularity has spread to Theravadin countries. Her popularity, however, peaks in Nepal, where she has a strong following among the Buddhist Newars of the Kathmandu Valley and is thus a central figure in Newar Buddhism. She is named Shiskar Apa in Lahul and Spiti.

- Vimalakirti

The central figure of the Vimalakirti Sutra where he is depicted as the ideal Buddhist lay follower.

- Agnidatta
- Ākāṅkṣitamukha
- Amoghadarśin
- Anantamati
- Anantapratibhāna
- Anantavikrāmin
- Anārambaṇadhyāyin
- Anikṣiptadhura
- Aniñjya
- Anupalipta
- Anupamamati
- Aśokadatta, bodhisattva of the south
- Āśvāsahasta
- Bhadrapāla
- Bhadraśrī
- Brahmajāla
- Bhaiṣajyasena
- Buddhaghoṣa
- Buddhiśrī
- Candrabhānu
- Candraśrī
- Candrasūryatrailokyadhārin
- Caryamati, bodhisattva of the west
- Daśaśataraśmihutārci (or Daśaśataraśmikṛtārci)
- Devarāja
- Dhācaṅiṁdhara
- Dhanaśrī
- Dharaṇīdhara
- Dharaṇīṃdhara
- Dharaṇīśvararāja
- Dharmadhara
- Dharmaketu
- Dharmakṣema
- Dharmamati
- Dharmavyūha
- Dharmeśvara
- Dhṛtiparipūrna
- Dundubhisvara
- Gadgadasvara
- Gajagandhahastin
- Gambhīraghoṣasvaranādita
- Gandhahastin
- Guhyagupta
- Harisiṃha
- Indrajāla
- Jālinīprabha
- Jayadatta, bodhisattva of the north
- Jayamati
- Jñānadarśana
- Jñānagarbha
- Jñānākara
- Jñānamati
- Jñānaprabha
- Jñānaśrī
- Jyotirasa
- Kṣetralaṃkṛta
- Lakṣaṇakūṭasamatikrānta
- Lakṣaṇasamalaṁkṛta
- Mahābrahmāśaṅku
- Mahāghoṣasvararāja
- Mahākaruṇācandrin
- Mahāmati
- Mahāmeru
- Mahāpratibhāna
- Mahāvikrāmin
- Mahāvyūha
- Maṇicūḍa
- Maṇiratnacchattra
- Mārajit
- Mārapramardin
- Megharāja
- Meru
- Merudhvaja
- Merukūṭa
- Merupradīparāja
- Merurāja
- Meruśikharadhara
- Meruśikharasaṁghaṭṭanarāja
- Merusvara
- Nakṣatrarāja
- Nakṣatrarājasaṃkusumitābhijña
- Nārāyaṇa
- Nityaprahasitapramuditendriya
- Nityodyukta
- Nityotkaṇṭhita
- Nityotkṣiptahasta
- Nityotpalakṛtahasta
- Pradānaśūra
- Padmagarbha
- Padmanetra
- Padmapāṇi, bodhisattva of the southeast
- Padmaśrī
- Padmaśrīgarbha
- Padmavyūha
- Padmottara, bodhisattva of the nadir
- Prabhāketu
- Prabhāvyūha
- Prabhūtaratna
- Prajdākūṭa
- Prajñākūta
- Pralānaśūra
- Prāmodyarāja
- Praṇidhiprayātaprāpta
- Praśāntacāritramati
- Pratibhānakūṭa
- Pratisaṃvitpraṇādaprāpta
- Pratisaṃvitprāpta
- Pṛthivīvaralocana
- Pūrṇacandra
- Ratiṁkara
- Ratnacandra
- Ratnacūḍa
- Ratnadhvaja
- Ratnadvīpa
- Ratnagarbha
- Ratnajaha
- Ratnajāli
- Ratnākara
- Ratnaketu
- Ratnakūṭa
- Ratnamudrāhasta
- Ratnamukuṭa
- Ratnananda
- Ratnapāṇi
- Ratnaprabha
- Ratnaprabhāsa
- Ratnasaṁbhava
- Ratnaśikhara
- Ratnaśrī
- Ratnayaṣṭi
- Ratnavara, bodhisattva of the northwest
- Ratnavīra
- Ratnavyūha
- Ratnayaṣṭin
- Ratnolkādhārin
- Sadāparibhūta, one of Śākyamuni's past lives
- Sāgaramati
- Sahacittotpādadharmacakrapravartin
- Śailaśikharasaṃghaṭṭanarāja
- Samadarśin
- Samādhigarbha
- Samādhivikurvaṇarāja
- Samantacandra
- Samantacāritramati
- Samantanetra
- Samantaprabha, bodhisattva of the east
- Samantaprāsādika
- Samanteryapatha
- Samatāvihārin
- Samaviṣamadarśin
- Sarvabhayahara
- Sarvamalāpagata
- Sarvamaṅgaladhārin
- Sarvanīvaraṇaviṣkambhin
- Sarvapuṇyalakṣaṇadhārin
- Sarvārthanāman
- Sarvasattvapriyadarśana
- Sarvaśūra
- Sarvatīrthamaṅgaladhārin
- Satatamabhayaṁdad (or Satatamabhayaṁdadāna)
- Satatasamitābhiyukta
- Satatodyukta
- Siṃha
- Siṃhaketu
- Siṃhaghoṣābhigarjitaśvara
- Siṃhamati
- Siṁhanādanādin
- Siṁhavikrīḍita
- Siddhārthamati
- Śrīgarbha
- Śubhagarbha
- Śubhakanakaviśuddhiprabha
- Śubhavimalagarbha
- Sujāta
- Sumati
- Sumeru
- Supratiṣṭhitabuddhi
- Sūryagarbha
- Sūryaprabha, bodhisattva of the southwest
- Suvarnacūḍa
- Suvarṇagarbha
- Suvikrāntamati
- Svaraviśuddhiprabha
- Svaravyūha
- Tathāgatagarbha
- Trailokyarikrāmin
- Uṣṇīṣavijayā
- Uttaramati
- Vairocana
- Vairocanarāśmipratimaṅḍitadhvajarājan
- Vajragarbha
- Vajramati
- Vajrasena
- Vardamānamati
- Varuṇa
- Vidyuddeva
- Vidyutdeva
- Vijayavikrāmin, bodhisattva of the northeast
- Vikurvaṇarāja
- Vimalagarbha
- Vimalanetra
- Vimukticandra
- Viśālanetra
- Viśeṣamati
- Vyūharāja
