= Ten Rākṣasīs =

Tutelary deities in Mahayana Buddhism

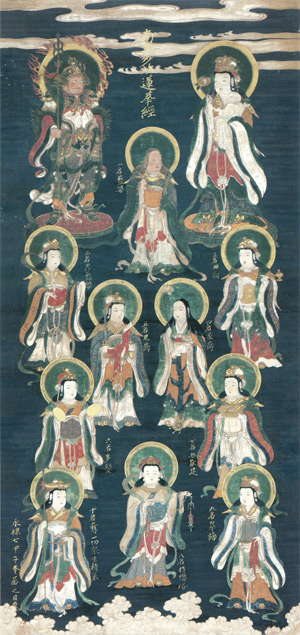
- Painting of the Ten Rākṣasīs with Hārītī and Vaiśravaṇa by Hasegawa Tōhaku (Japan, 1564)
- Chinese: 十羅刹女 (Pinyin: shíluóchànǚ)
- Japanese: 十羅刹女 (romaji: jūrasetsunyo)
- Korean: 십나찰녀 (RR: simnachalnyeo)
- Vietnamese: Thập la sát nữ

Information
- Venerated by: Mahāyāna: (Lotus Sutra); (Mahāmayūrī Vidyarājñī Sūtra); (法華十羅剎法)

The Ten Rākṣasīs (十羅刹女), sometimes translated as the misnomer ten demon daughters or ten demonesses are a group of rākṣasīs who take on the role of tutelary deities in Mahayana Buddhism.

Along with the yakshi mother Hārītī, they are said to be votaries of those who uphold the Lotus Sutra. They are particularly popular in the Tendai and Nichiren schools. They are also attendants of the bodhisattva Samantabhadra.

== Summary ==
The Ten Rākṣasīs appear in the Dhāraṇī chapter of the Lotus Sutra. Some of these figures are found sporadically in texts throughout the Buddhist canon, most notably the Mahāmayūrī Vidyarājñī Sutra.

They are also recognized as attendants of the bodhisattva Samantabhadra, which has become a popular theme in East Asian Buddhist painting and statuary.

Esoteric tradition recognizes the rākṣasīs as avatars of respective Buddhas and bodhisattvas from whom they are believed to have manifested. Accounts vary among texts and school of thought. In Japan, a common account is derived from the ‘’Esoteric Samaya Sutra of the Samādhi Samaya of the Lotus Sutra’’ (妙法蓮華経三昧三昧耶秘密三摩耶経).

The Chinese names of each rākṣasī differs between Kumarajiva and Xuanzang's translations. The former tends toward transliterated Sanskrit while the latter translated the meanings of the respective goddesses' names.

The names of the rākṣasīs are as follows:

| Sanskrit | Chinese | Japanese | Korean | Vietnamese | Tibetan (Wly. | Avatars |
|---|---|---|---|---|---|---|
| Lambā | 藍婆 (pinyin: Lánpó) 有結縛 (pinyin: Yǒujiéfú) | 藍婆 (ranba) 有結縛 (ukechibaku) | 남파 (RR: nampa) 유결박 (RR: yugyeolbak) | Lam bà Hữu kết phược | འཕྱང་མ། ’phyang ma | Viśiṣṭacāritra |
| Vilambā | 毘藍婆 (pinyin: Pílánpó) 離結 (pinyin: Líjié) | 毘藍婆 (biranba) 離結 (rikechi) | 비람파 (RR: birampa) 이결 (RR: igyeol) | Tỳ lam bà Li kết | རྣམ་པར་འཕྱང་མ། rnam par ’phyang ma | Anantacāritra |
| Kūṭadantī | 曲齒 (pinyin: Qǔchǐ) 施積 (pinyin: Shījī) | 曲歯 (kokushi) 施積 (seshaku) | 곡치 (RR: gokchi) 시적 (RR: sijeok) | Khúc xỉ Thi tích | སོ་བརྩེགས། so brtsegs | Viśuddhacāritra |
| Puṣpadantī | 華齒 (pinyin: Huāchǐ) 施華 (pinyin: Shīhuā) | 華歯 (keshi) 施華 (seke) | 화치 (RR: hwachi) 시화 (RR: sihwa) | Hoa xỉ Thi hoa | མེ་ཏོག་སོ། me tog so | Supratiṣṭhitacāritra |
| Makuṭadantī | 黑齒 (pinyin: Hēichǐ) 施黑 (pinyin: Shīhēi) | 黒歯 (kokushi) 施黒 (sekoku) | 흑치 (RR: heukchi) 시흑 (RR: siheuk) | Hắc xỉ Thi hắc | ཅོད་པན་སོ། cod pan so | Śākyamuni |
| Keśinī | 多髮 (pinyin: Duōfǎ) 被髮 (pinyin: Bèifǎ) | 多髪 (tahatsu) 被髪 (hihotsu) | 다발 (RR: dabal) 피발 (RR: pibal) | Đa phát Bị phát | སྐྲ་ཅན། skra can | Samantabhadra |
| Acalā | 無厭足 (pinyin: Wúyànzú) 無著 (pinyin: Wúzhaó) | 無厭足 (muenzoku) 無著 (mujaku) | 무염족 (RR: muyeomjok) 무착 (RR: muchak) | Vô yếm túc Vô trước | མེ། me | Mañjuśrī |
| Mālādhāri | 持瓔珞 (pinyin: Chíyīngluò) 持華 (pinyin: Chíhuā) | 持瓔珞 (jiyōraku) 持華 (jike) | 지영락 (RR: jiyeongrak) 지화 (RR: jihwa) | Trì anh lạc Trì hoa | ཕྲེང་བ་འཆང་། phreng ba ’chang | Avalokiteśvara |
| Kuntī | 皐帝 (pinyin: Gāodì) 何所 (pinyin: Hésuǒ) | 皇諦 (kōdai) 何所 (kasho) | 고제 (RR: goje) 하소 (RR: haso) | Cao đế Hà sở | མདུང་ཅན། mdung can | Maitreya |
| Sarvasattvojohārī | 奪一切眾生精氣 (pinyin: Duóyīqièzhòngshēngjīngqì) 取一切精 (pinyin: Qǔyīqièjīng) | 奪一切衆生精気 (datsuissaishujōshōge) 取一切精 (juissaishō) | 탈일체중생정기 (RR: tarilchejungsaengjeonggi) 취일체정 (RR: chwiilchejeong) | Đoạt nhất thiết chúng sinh tinh khí Thủ nhất thiết tinh | སེམས་ཅན་ཐམས་ཅད་ཀྱི་མདངས་འཕྲོག sems can thams cad kyi mdangs ’phrog | Prabhūtaratna |

The chapter concludes that one who does not accept their dhāraṇī and proceeds to cause trouble for someone who teaches the Lotus Sutra will have their head split into seven pieces.

=== Dhāraṇī ===
Iti me iti me iti me iti me iti me, nime nime nime nime nime, ruhe ruhe ruhe ruhe ruhe, stuhe stuhe stuhe stuhe stuhe svāhā.

== Iconography ==
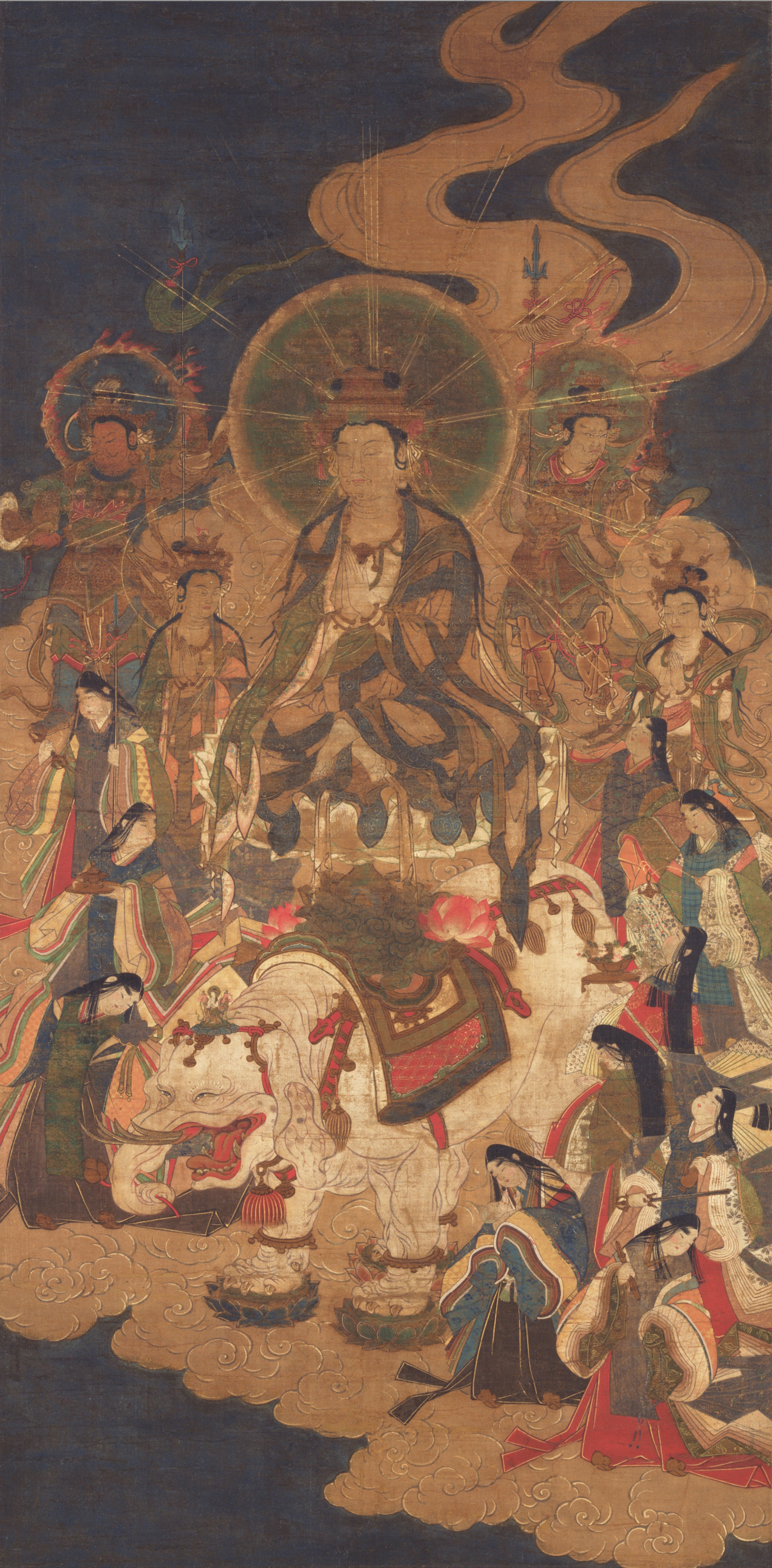
Samantabhadra accompanied by the Ten Rākṣasīs. Japanese depiction from the Kamakura period (1185–1333).

The Ten Rākṣasīs vary in appearance based on locale and textual tradition. One canonical text, the "Law of the Ten Rākṣasīs of the Lotus" (法華十羅剎法; pinyin: fǎhuá shíluóshā fǎ; Japanese: hokke-jūrasetunyo-hō) stands out with its description of the physical features of the goddesses. Alternative forms tend to stem from Japanese Buddhist art manuals or local traditions throughout Asia.

- Lambā has a form like that of a yakṣa with blue garments and a flesh tone face. She holds a vajra mallet with which she strikes her right shoulder. Her left hand holds a mala. She kneels on her left knee. Alternatively, she wields a sword in her right hand and a sutra in her left hand.
- Vilambā has a form like that of a full moon, akin to a dragon king. She is thus inclined toward the great ocean. Her garments are green (碧緑) and her face is white. She stands before a mirror stand. She controls the wind and clouds with her right hand and hold a mala in her left hand. Alternatively, she holds a pair of cymbals.
- Kūṭadantī has a form of an apsara maiden. Her garments are blue and her face is humble. She has prominent, fearsome teeth, a trait which earned her name. She kneels in the half lotus posture while offering a basket of fragrant flowers.
- Puṣpadantī has a form like a nun. Her garments are purple and her face is slightly humble. She has clear and distinct rows of teeth, like the petals of a flower. She holds a bouquet of flowers in her right hand and a flower dish in her left hand. Alternatively, her right hand hangs down while her left hand holds a mani jewel.
- Makuṭadantī has the form of a goddess. Her garments are all of exquisite color She conceals her frightening black teeth. She wields a trident in her right hand and a flask in her left hand and sits in the defensive half-lotus posture.. Alternatively, she wields a banner bedazzled with jewels in her left hand while her right hand rests upon her chest.
- Keśinī is named after her long locks of hair. Her form is like that of a child, a full moon, or a flesh colored gandharva maiden. She holds a copper bracelet in her right hand while her left hand dances. She sits on her knees with her back upright. Alternatively, she wields a banner bedazzled with jewels in her right hand while her left hand rests upon her chest.
- Acalā is like a crown of sutras. She is an ever watchful guardian and her clothes are light in color. In her left hand she holds a water jar and in her right hand is a lotus petal.
- Mālādhāri appears like Śrīdevī. Her clothes are the color of gold and her face is the tone of flesh. She sits in the lotus posture and wields a garland of precious stones in both hands, from which she garners her name.
- Kuntī appears like a woman crying from overhead. Her garments are crimson and blue and she kneels kneeling with a skirt in her right hand and a single-pronged vajra in her left hand. Alternatively, she carries a box of sutras or an incense burner.
- Sarvasattvojohārī takes the form of a consort of Brahmā or Śakra. She wears armor and emerges from the crown of a horse's head. Her shape is fierce. She wields a vajra in her right hand and a trident in her left hand. Her clothes are a mixture of colors and she sits in the lotus posture. Alternatively, she performs the añjali mudrā.

== In Japan ==
=== Kagura ===
An Iwami kagura titled "Jūra" (十羅) is named after the goddesses, specifically their manifestation as the daughters of the kami Susanoo. The plot follows a kishin named Hikohane who arrives at the shore of Tsushima Island after an ordeal in a violent storm. The Ten Rākṣasīs entreat Hikohane to return to his homeland, to which he responds by engaging them in battle.

Incidentally, there is a legend in Iwami that the local goddess Munasukihime is a manifestation of the Ten Rākṣasīs.

=== Noh ===
A yōkyoku titled "Ōyashiro" (大社) features a dance performed by the Ten Rākṣasīs.

The Kaichū yōkyoku zenshū, Volume 1, compiled by Nogami Toyoichirō states that although the Ten Rākṣasīs were originally a group of ten fearsome demonnesses, folk tradition has it that they are the daughters born from the union of Susanoo-no-Mikoto and a dragon.

=== Shinto shrines ===
The influence of shinbutsu shūgō in Japan has prompted the worship of these goddesses at some Shinto shrines. These shrines are given the title Jūrasetsunyo-sha (十羅刹女社; lit. "Ten Rākṣasīs shrines").

- Hinomisaki Shrine (日御碕神社) in Izumo, Shimane
- Nagasaki Shrine (長崎神社) in Toshima, Tokyo
- Kasuga Shrine (春日神社), on the grounds of Jufuku-ji in Nerima, Tokyo

=== Other ===
Sanbō Kōjin (三寶荒神) is a deity who is believed in some Buddhist circles to be an alternate form of the Ten Rākṣasīs. The Gogikuden 御義口傳 of Nichiren Buddhism explains that while he is not a follower of the Lotus Sutra, he remains a protector deity for those who are.

== See also ==
- Rākṣasa
- List of Rakshasas
- Dharmapala
