= Varya =

Varya may refer to:

- Warya, Muslim Rajput community of India and Pakistan
- Russian diminutive of Varvara
- Varya (rakshasa), spirit in Indian mythology; see List of Rakshasas
