= Hariti =

Both a revered goddess and demon in some Buddhist traditions

Translations of Hārītī
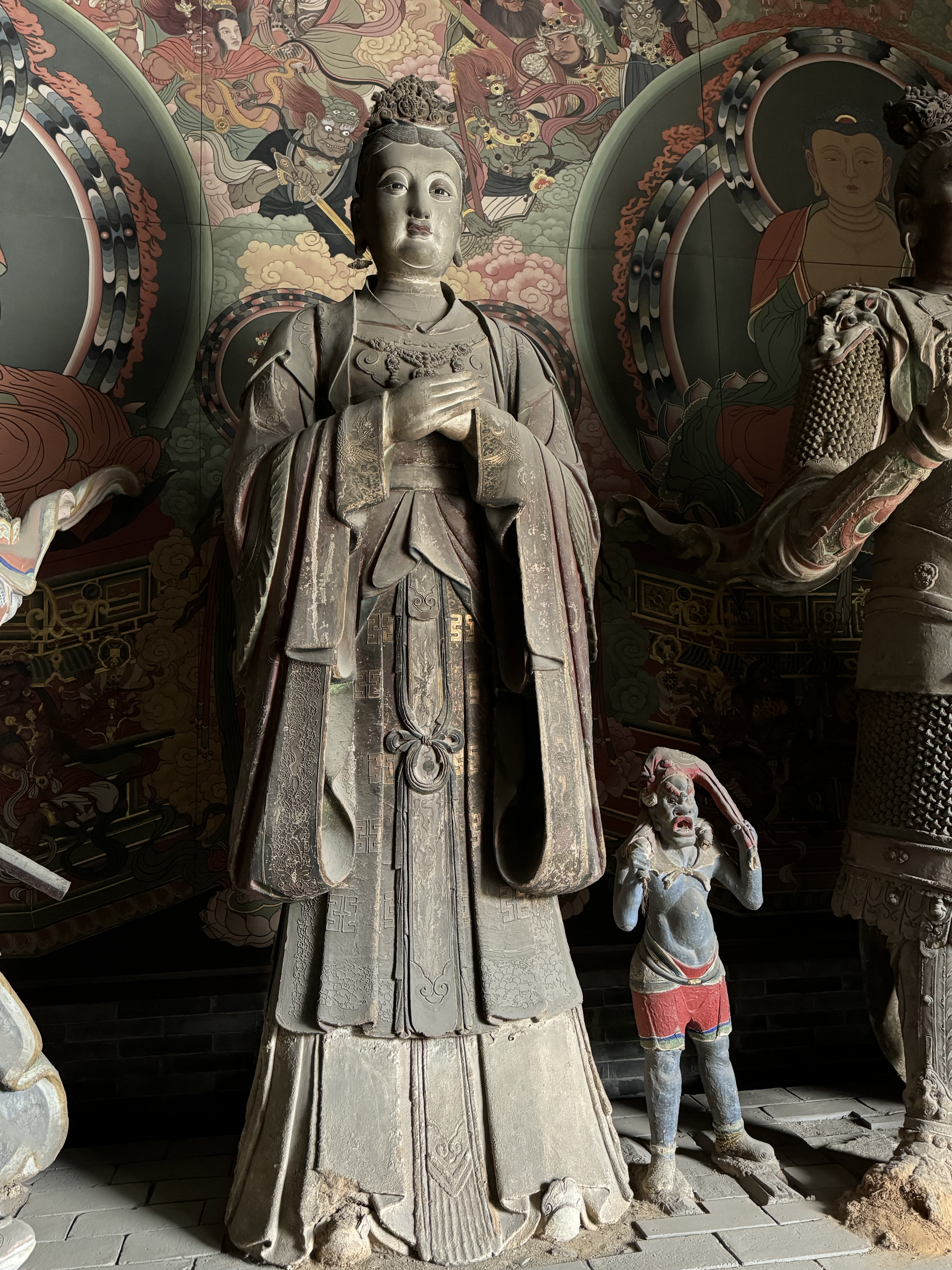
- Statue of Guizimu with a child rakshasa in Shanhua Temple (善化寺) in Datong, Shanxi, China
- Sanskrit: हारीती (IAST: Hārītī)
- Chinese: 鬼子母 or 鬼子母神 (Pinyin: Guǐzǐmǔ or Guǐzǐmǔshén)
- Japanese: 鬼子母神 (Rōmaji: Kishimojin)
- Korean: 귀자모신 鬼子母神 (RR: Gwijamoshin)
- Tagalog: Haliti

Hārītī (Sanskrit), also known as Chinese: 鬼子母(神); pinyin: Guǐzǐmǔ(shén), Japanese: 鬼子母神, romanized: Kishimojin, is a female rākṣasī or yakṣinī (nature spirit) in Buddhism. She appears as a character in all Buddhist traditions and she is revered as a fierce Dharma Protector and a fertility goddess in Mahayana Buddhism. Hārītī appears in various Mahayana sutras, including in the Lotus Sutra, where she vows to protect those who uphold the sutra. She is also mentioned as a protector in the Candragarbhasūtra.

In East Asian Buddhism, she is respected as a dharmapala. In Chinese Buddhism, she is typically considered as one of the Twenty-Four Protective Deities. In Japanese Buddhist traditions such as Shingon and Nichiren, she is revered as a deity of fertility and easy childbirth. Meanwhile in the Vajrayana tradition of Nepalese Buddhism she is also revered as a protection goddess. In the Mahayana tradition, she is associated with fertility, the protection of children, easy delivery and happy child rearing. She is also known to scare irresponsible parents and unruly children. In some Asian folk traditions, her darker side as causing terror to children is sometimes emphasized.

== Theravada ==
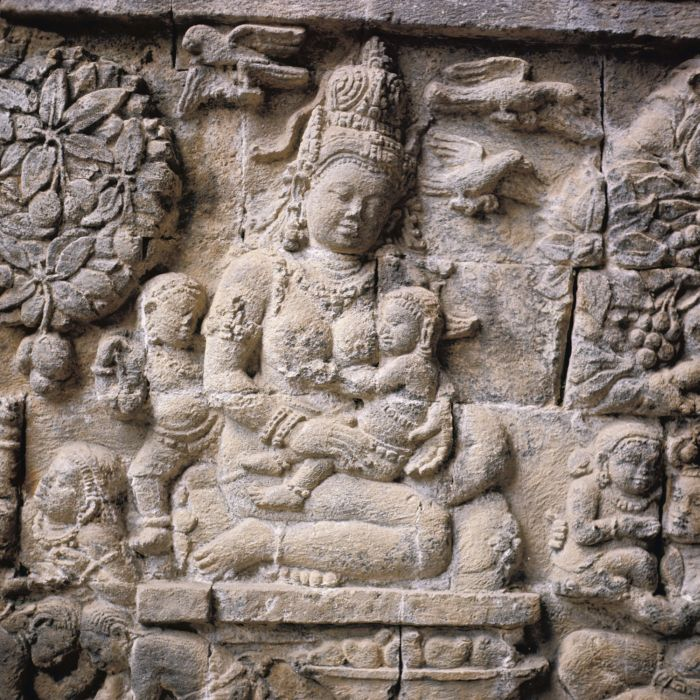
The bas-relief of Hariti with her children on inner northern wall of Mendut, 9th century

According to a Thai-Burmese Thervada oral story popular in Southeast Asia, Abhiriti or Hariti was a yakshini born in the Buddhasasana of Buddha Vesabhu. She is considered to be a daughter of Mother Dhamma. Once in a city of the human realm, a helpless Yaksha infant was hungry and crying. None of the humans was willing to console him because of his brutal appearance. The innocent demon prayed to Mother Dhamma. Mother Dhamma looked at him with infinite compassion or mercy. From that compassion, Hariti was born. She came to the human realm and fed the hungry demon infant from her lactating breasts. When he was satisfied and stopped crying, Hariti took the child to the guardians of the Yaksha realm. Kubera, the king of Yakshas, was very impressed with Hariti. He proposed marriage to her, and with the permission of Mother Dharma, she became the mother of all asuras/demons.

There are hundreds of stories about the dedication of Hariti to her devotees and response to their prayers. Once, the human realm experienced extreme drought and dying crops. Buddhist monks advised the people to ask Hariti to help them. Humans and yakshas alike started praying to Yaksha king Kubera and Mother Hariti. With the help of Hariti and her divine powers of compassion, rain fell, greenery was returned and the earth realm was blessed with prosperity. Hariti created a divine jar to provide infinite prosperity to the human realm.

Yakshas usually live longer than humans, perhaps even for many kalpa (eons or ages). Hariti is considered as the possessor of mysterious wealth. She is steadfast in ethics, mindfulness, and wisdom.

Once, Hariti was dwelling in the city of Rajgir where Buddha Shakyamuni was staying. At that time, she had no children. Wanting to experience motherhood, she started taking unhappy human babies from Rajgir into her abode. The babies' mothers in Rajgir pleaded to the Buddha. Buddha went to Hariti's abode and brought one of the kidnapped children (though beloved by Hariti) with him to his vihara in Rajgir. Hariti was devastated when she found the child was gone.

After futilely searching for the little one she loved, Hariti appealed to the Buddha. The Buddha asked Hariti to consider how deeply she was suffering in the absence of one child, and similarly, many of other mothers and families were still suffering from the loss of their beloved children, kidnapped by Hariti or otherwise disappeared in this world of suffering. Hariti realized and acknowledged that their suffering was greater than hers. She returned all the kidnapped babies to their mothers and became steadfast in the Dhamma. The Buddha taught Hariti dhamma practices that could be associated with the upbringing of a child. Hariti started practicing universal metta (loving kindness) and karuna (compassion) to all beings. Hariti declared that she was no longer a yaksha with no children, but now the mother of all beings. Hariti promised the Buddha that she would protect and love children of all realms, human and non-human. Hariti practices and teaches the four Brahma viharas to all worldly beings, for benefits of all her human and non-human children. Buddha hailed Hariti as the Jagatmata or the Mother of All Realms. In some schools of Theravada Buddhism, she is the Supreme Mother of all humans and non-humans, who eliminates or destroys obstacles to the practice of dhamma.

== Mahayana Buddhism ==
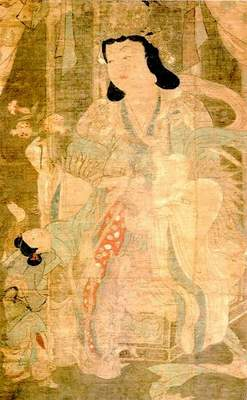
Kishimojin as a demon mistress with infant. 12th–13th century, Kamakura period. Daigo-ji, Kyoto, Japan.

According to a similar Mahayana tale, Hārītī was originally a rākṣasī of Rajgir at the same time that Gautama Buddha lived there. She had hundreds of yaksha children of her own, whom she loved and doted upon, but to feed them, she abducted and killed the children of other humans. The bereaved mothers of her victims pleaded to the Buddha to save them. So, the Buddha invited the youngest of Hariti's sons, Piṅgala (in a variant version, the youngest daughter), to Rajgir, and asked him to hide under the Buddha's alms bowl. After having desperately searched for her missing son throughout the universe, Hārītī finally appealed to the Buddha for help.

The Buddha pointed out that she was suffering because she lost one of her hundreds of children, and then asked if she could imagine the suffering of parents whose only child had been devoured. Hārītī pondered, and then replied with deep contrition that their suffering must be many times greater than hers. She then vowed to protect all children, and instead of children's flesh, she would only eat pomegranates. Henceforth, Hārītī became the protector of all children and women in childbirth. The Buddha then revealed her son hiding under his alms bowl. Feeling very grateful through this compassionate exchange with the Buddha, Hārītī achieved bodhi and mettā, which enabled her to withstand black magic, evil powers, and gave her the facility to cure the sick.

=== Japan ===
In the Japanese version of the tale, Hārītī, known as Kishimojin, enlisted the aid of the Ten Rākṣasī Women (十羅刹女, jūrasetsunyo) to abduct and murder the children of other families. In some variants of the myth, the Ten Rākṣasī Women are themselves daughters (or daughters' daughters) of Kishimojin. When Kishimojin accepted the Buddha's teachings, the Ten Demon Daughters did likewise.

In Japanese Buddhist tradition, Hārītī, Kishimojin becomes an aspect of Kannon, the goddess of mercy, bearing the epithets "Bringer of Happiness" (歓喜母) and "Giver of Children and Easy Delivery" (子安鬼子母神).

In Nichiren Buddhism, Hārītī is referred to as "the Mother of Devil Children," in the 26th chapter of the Lotus Sutra. In Shingon Buddhism, she is named Karitei (訶利帝) or Karitei-mo (訶梨帝母). Her iconography is based mostly on the Dai Yakusha Nyo Kangimo Narahini Aishi Jōjuhō (大薬叉女歓喜母并愛子成就法).

=== China ===
In Chinese Buddhism, Hārītī, known as Guizimu, has been respected as a Buddhist protector deity since her introduction to China with the translation of Buddhist scriptures from the Western Jin Dynasty (266-420) to the Tang dynasty (618-907). She is also known by the alternate names of Helidi (訶利帝) or Helidimu (訶梨帝母). In the Song dynasty (960-1279) and the Yuan dynasty (1271-1368), her stories became a popular theme in literary and artistic creations such as zaju opera. In particular, the dramatic part of her narrative where the Buddha raising the alms bowl to reveal her son, known as "Jiebo" (揭缽, lit: "Raising the Alms-bowl"), became a popular motif.

In contemporary Chinese Buddhist practice, Guizimu is frequently enshrined as one of the deities invited to the ritual space during performances of the Shuilu Fahui ceremony, which is a multi-day universal salvation rite where all beings in the Buddhist cosmos are summoned and provided nourishment in the form of offerings and Buddhist teachings. During this ceremony, a shuilu ritual painting of her is typically enshrined together with the other worldly deities. In addition, she is also generally classified as of the Twenty-Four Protective Devas (二十四諸天), a group of Dharmapalas who are venerated as protectors of Buddhists and the Dharma. Statues of this group (including Guizimu) are often enshrined within the Daxiong Baodian in Chinese temples and monasteries. In certain regions of China, particularly in Yunnan, she has become integrated deeply with the local fertility goddess and is respected under the name of Baijie shengfei (白姐聖妃 lit: "White Sister Consort") or Helidimu (訶梨帝母 lit: "Hārītī mother").

== Iconography ==
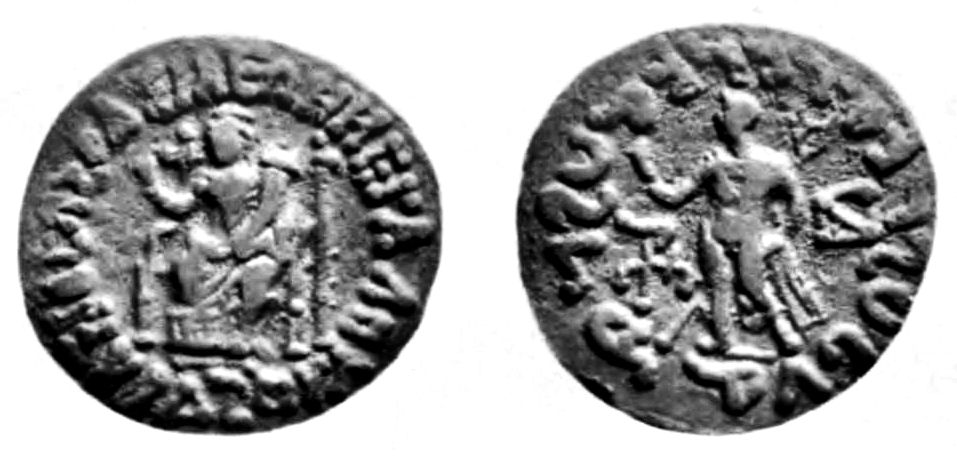
Azes coin from Peshawar, with Demeter/ Hariti with children and holding a cornucopia (Obv.) and Hermes (Rev.), 1st century BCE

As seen in the early 1st century BCE examples below, Hariti was sometimes depicted in a monumental yakshi form, accompanied by or carrying one or more children. The iconography of the Greek goddess Tyche shows similarities to Hārītī, and may have been transmitted to East Asia from Gandharan India through the influence of Greco-Buddhism. In Greek art, Tyche was depicted in the presence of children, carrying a cornucopia (horn of plenty), an emblematic gubernaculum (ship's rudder), and the wheel of fortune; she may stand on the wheel, presiding over the entire circle of fate. We also see Kushan influences via the goddess Ardoksho or Ardoxsho.

Hariti statues from Gandhara
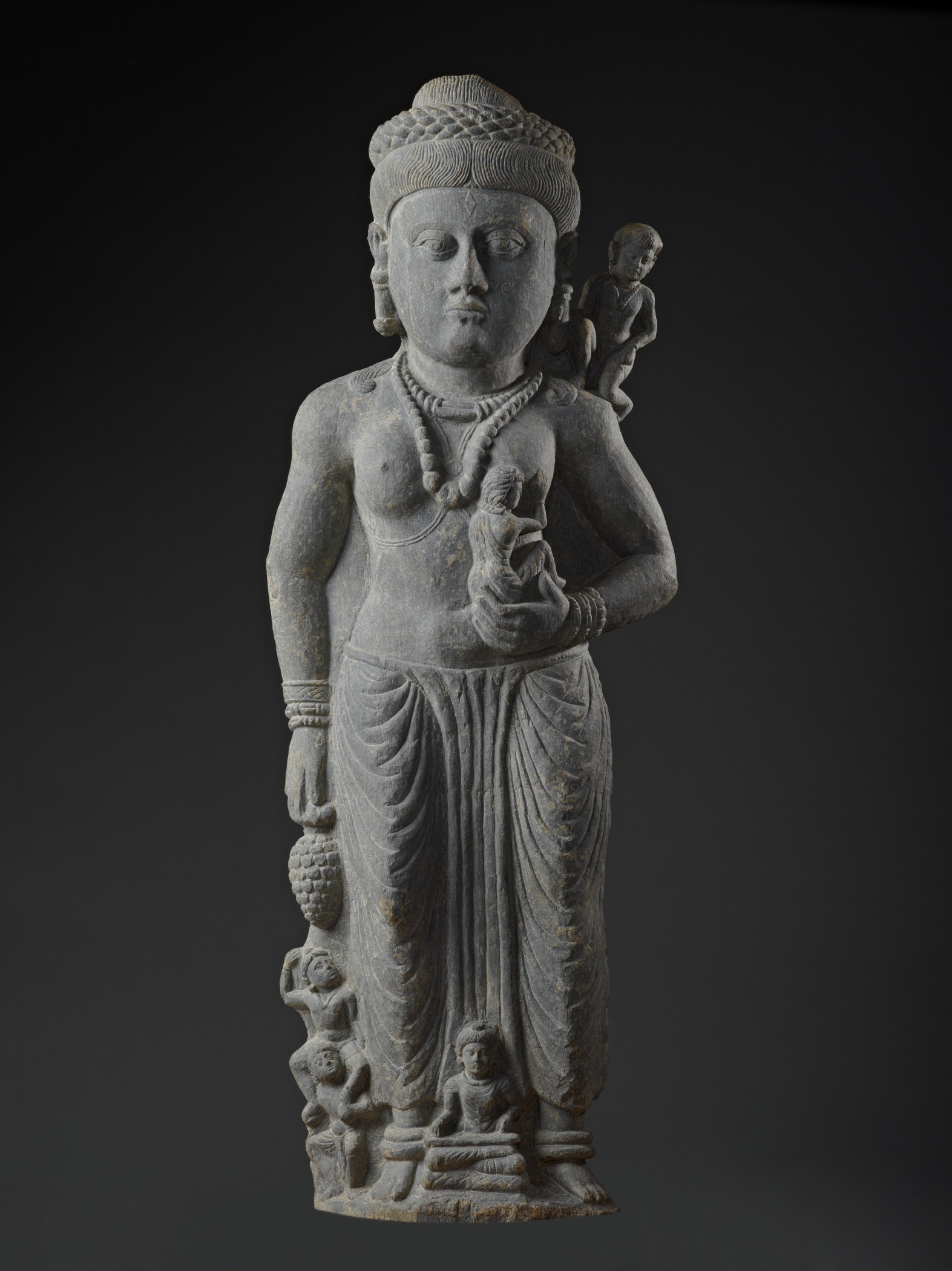
Hariti with children (front). 1st century BCE, Gandhara.

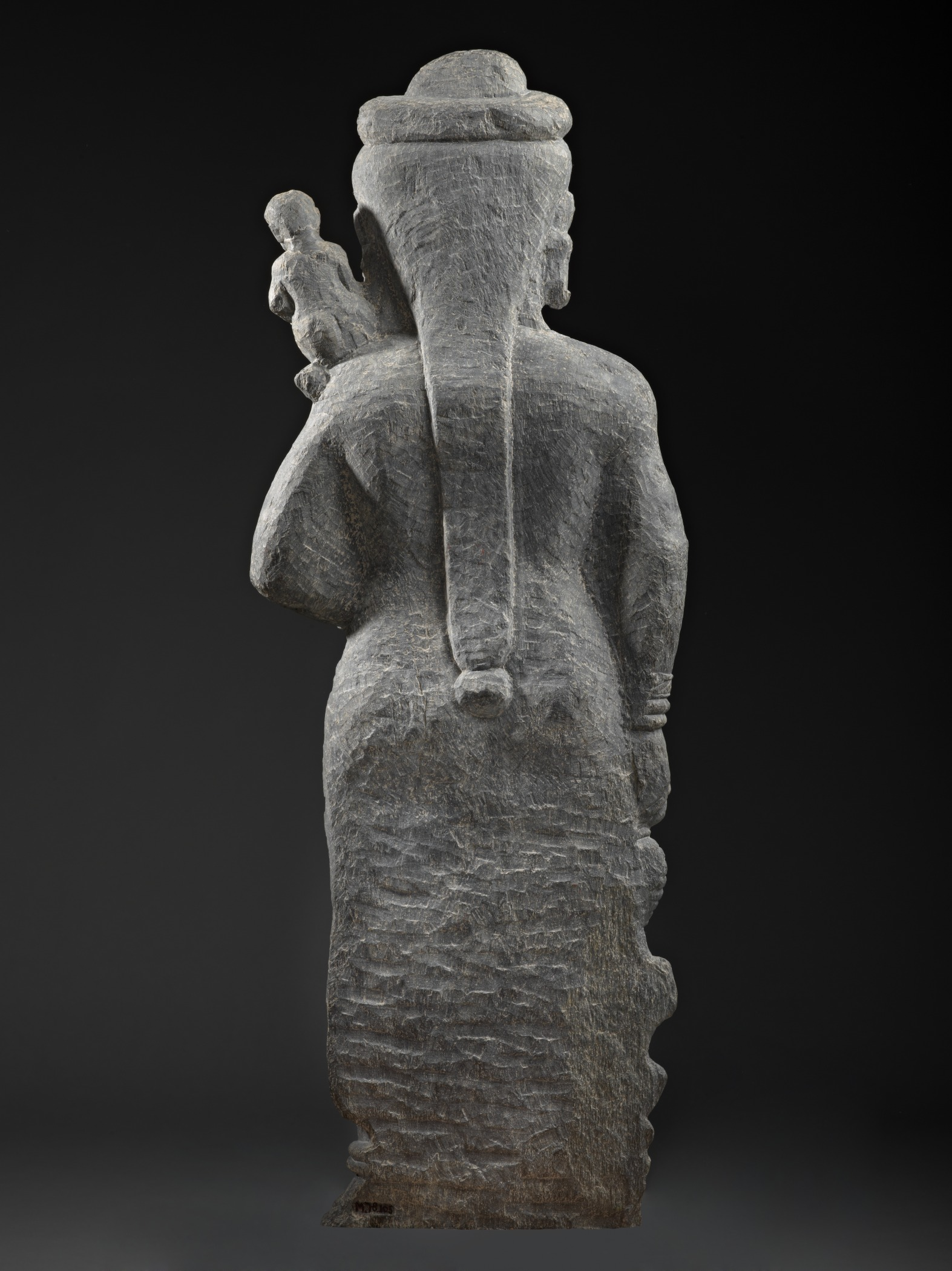
Hariti with children (back). 1st century BCE, Gandhara.

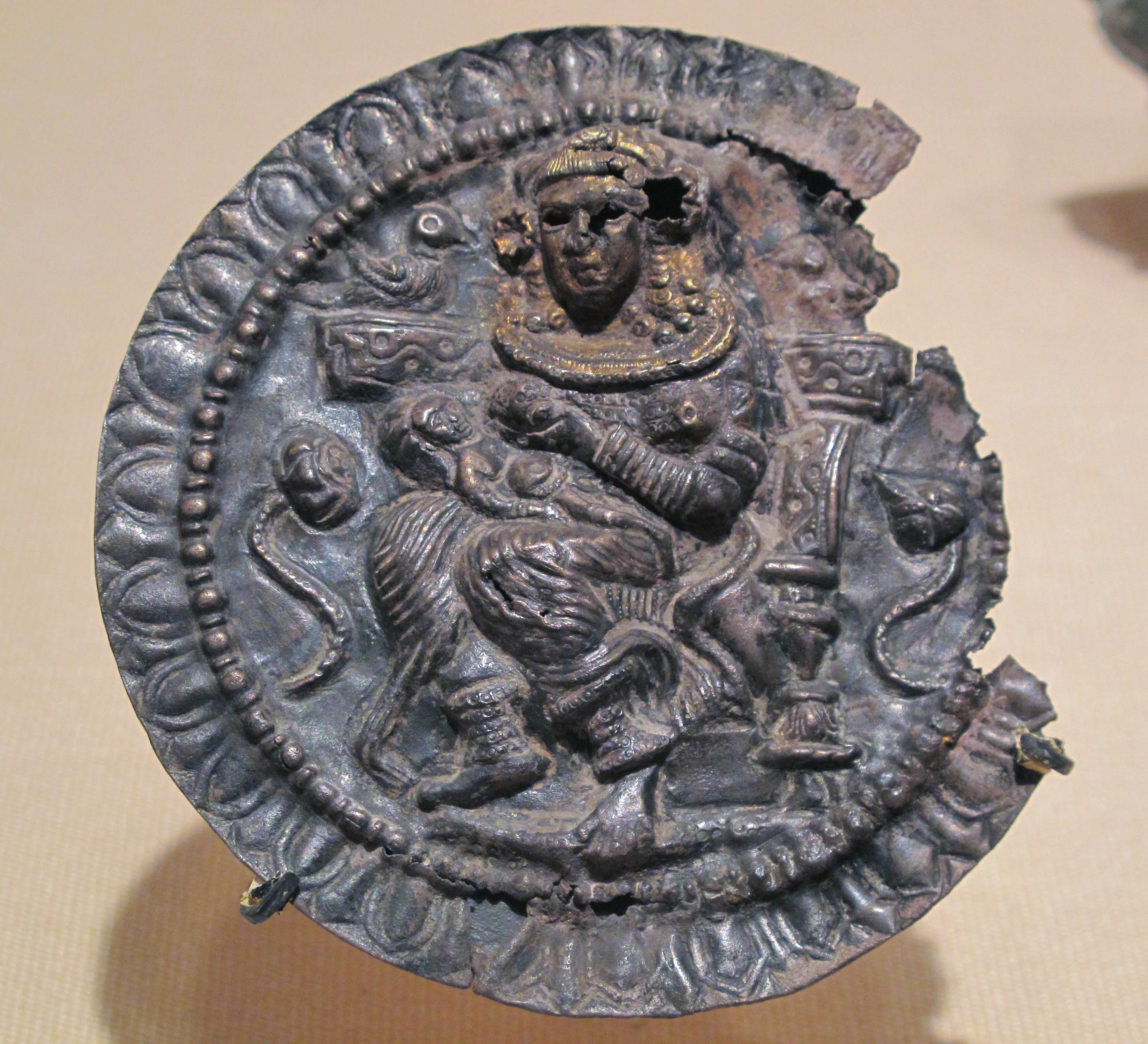
Rondel with the Goddess Hariti, 1st century CE

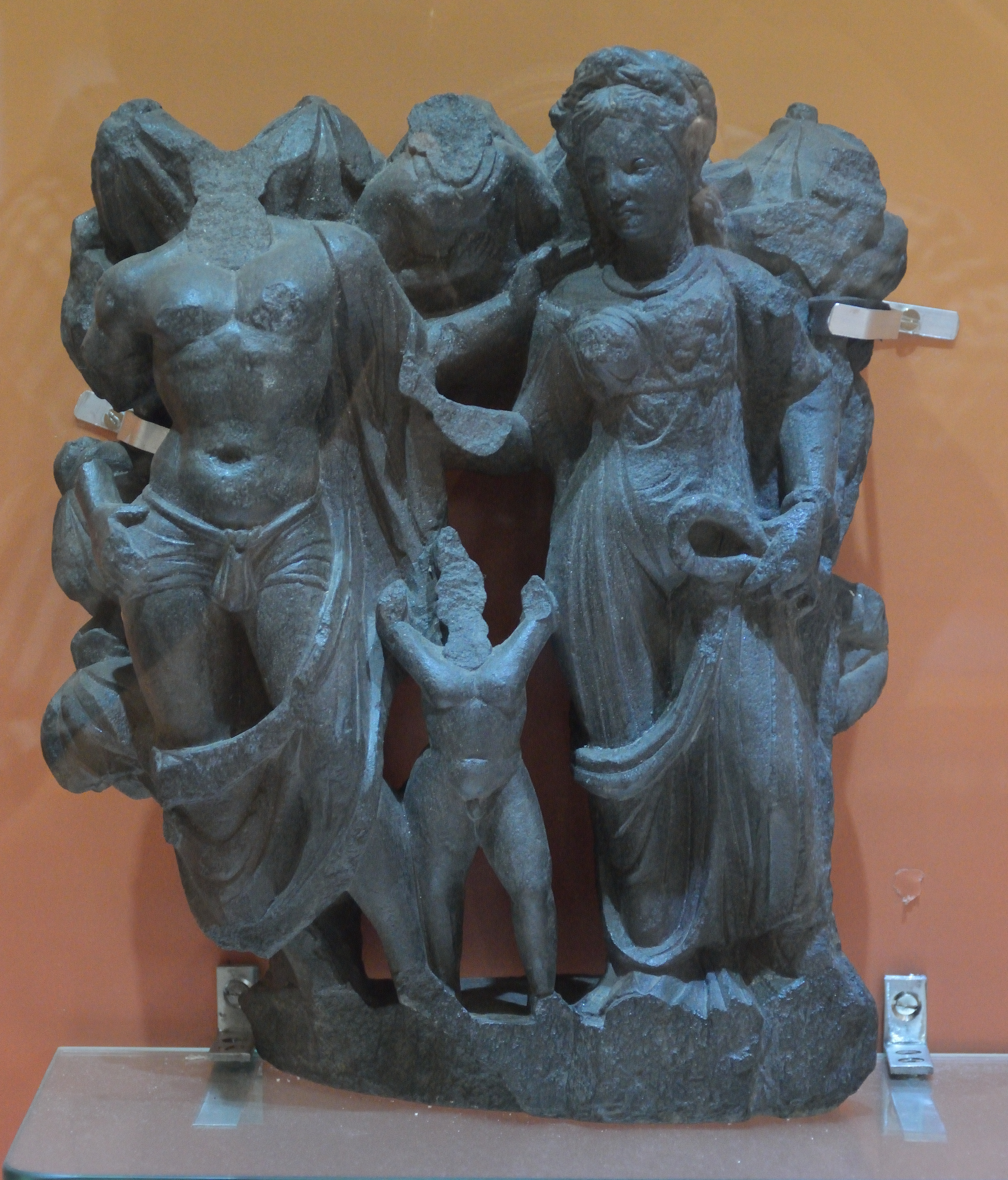
Hariti and Panchika, c. 2nd century CE - Gandhara

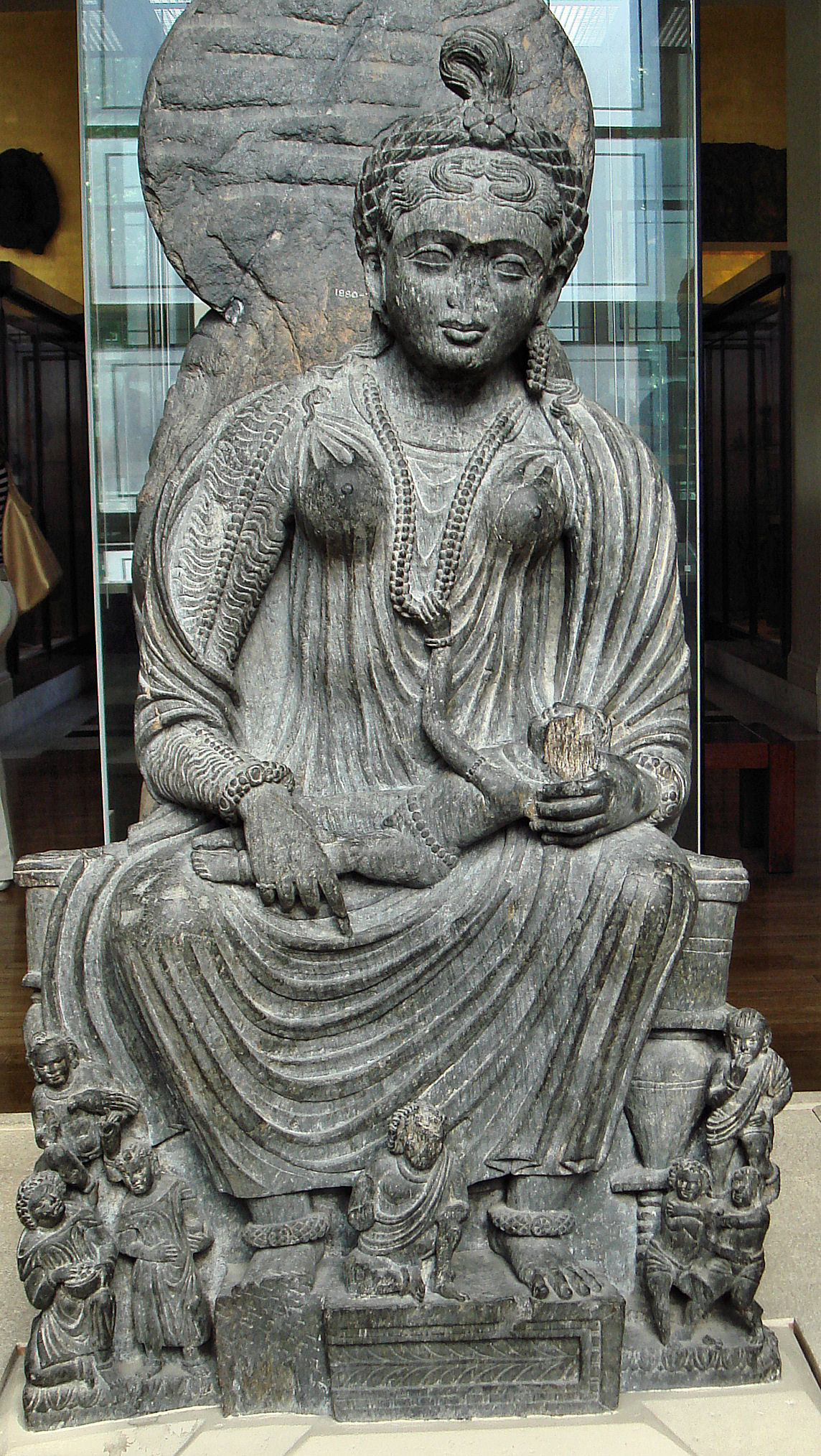
Statue of seated Hārītī with children from Yusufzai country around Peshawar, Pakistan in the British Museum, 2nd–3rd centuries CE

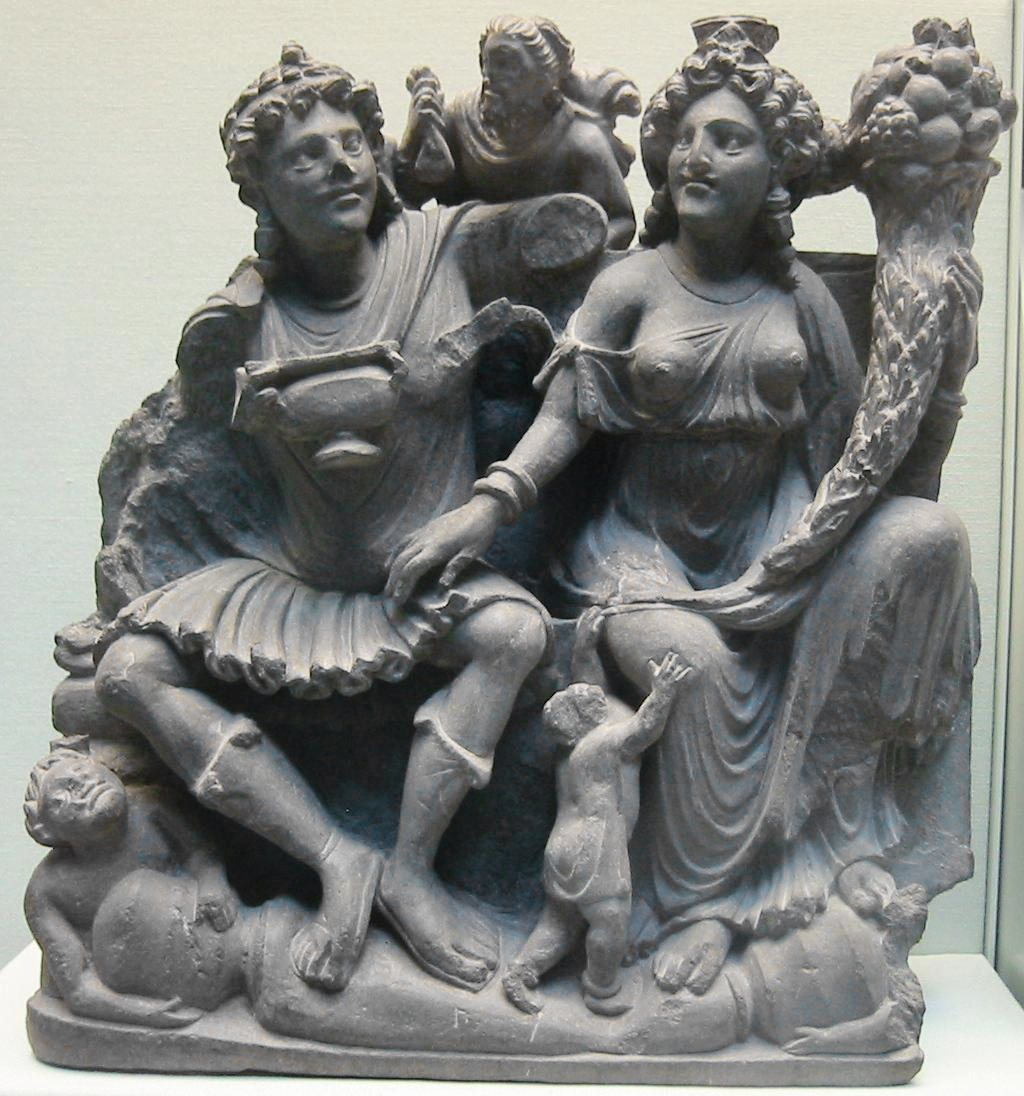
Pharo and Ardoxsho, Gandhara

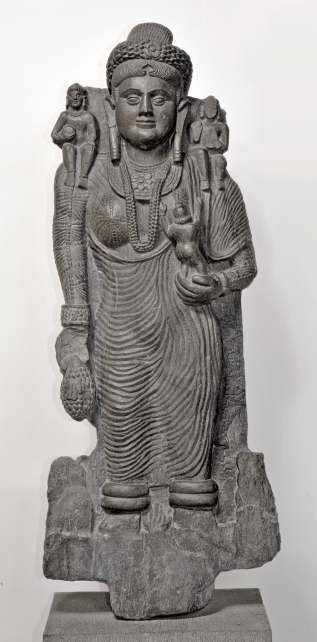
Hariti, c. 2nd century CE from Gandhara at Government Museum and Art Gallery, Chandigarh

== Bibliography ==
- Langenberg, Amy Paris (2013). Pregnant Words: South Asian Buddhist Tales of Fertility and Child protection, History of Religions 52 (4), 340-369
- Lesbre, E. (2000). La conversion de Hārītī au Buddha: origine du thème iconographique et interprétations picturales chinoises, Arts asiatiques 55 (1), 98-119
