= Anantacaritra =

Bodhisattva mentioned in the Lotus Sutra

Anantacāritra
- Sanskrit: अनन्तचारित्र; Anantacāritra
- Chinese: 無邊行菩薩 (Pinyin: Wúbiānxíng Púsà)
- Japanese: 無辺行菩薩(むへんぎょうぼさつ) (romaji: Muhengyō Bosatsu)
- Khmer: អនន្តចារិត្រ (a-non-chaa-reut)
- Korean: 무변행보살 (RR: Mubyeonhaeng Bosal)
- Tibetan: སྤྱོད་པ་མཐའ་ཡས་ Wylie: spyod pa mtha’ yas
- Vietnamese: Vô Biên Hạnh Bồ Tát

Information
- Venerated by: Mahāyāna, Vajrayāna

Anantacāritra (Sanskrit: अनन्तचारित्र; also known as Boundless Practice) is one of the four great perfected bodhisattvas mentioned in the 15th chapter of the Lotus Sutra. According to the Supplement to the Words and Phrases of the Lotus Sutra (法華文句輔正記), by Tiantai priest Dàoxiān, this bodhisattva is understood as representing eternity.

== See also ==
- Visistacaritra
- Visuddhacaritra
- Supratisthitacaritra
