= List of Rakshasas =

List of Indian mythological creatures

Below is a non-exhaustive list of Rakshasas, a race of anthropomorphic spirits in Indian mythology. While many are malevolent, some are benevolent protectors of Dharma.

Rakshasas are male while Rakshasis are female.

Religious traditions that feature these entries are sorted using the following key:

- ॐ - Hinduism
- ☸ - Buddhism
- 卐 - Jainism

== List in alphabetical order ==
=== A ===
- Acalā - One of the Ten Rakshasis of the Lotus Sutra ☸
- Akampana - One of Sumālī's ten sons ॐ
- Akṣayakumāra - One of Rāvaṇa's seven sons ॐ
- [ॐ
- Alambasa ॐ
- Alambuṣa ॐ
- Alāyudha ॐ
- Alumvusha ॐ
- Amarāri ॐ
- Aṅkūra - One of Kumbha's sons ॐ
- Anthkashur =very powerful in lanka ॐ
- Aśaniprabha ॐ
- Atikāya - One of Rāvaṇa's seven sons ॐ

=== B ===
- Bāka - Bakāsura's attendant ॐ
- Bakāsura ॐ
- Balāka ॐ
- Vibhīṣaṇa ॐ
- Bhāsakarṇa - One of Sumālī's ten sons ॐ
- Bhīma ॐ
- Bhīmaratha ॐ
- Bhīṣaṇa ॐ
- Bhīṣma ॐ
- Bhūtagrasani - One of the seventeen rakshasis invoked at the start of the Mahamayuri Vidyarajni Sutra ☸
- Brahmāpeta - Dwells in the sun during the month of Māgha (Viṣṇu Purāṇa) or Iṣa (Bhāgavata Purāṇa) ॐ
- Budha - Dwells in the sun during the month of Āṣādha or Śukra (Viṣṇu Purāṇa). Replaces Sahajanya from the Bhāgavata Purāṇa ॐ

=== C ===
- Cāpa - Dwells in the sun during the month of Kārttika (Viṣṇu Purāṇa). Replaces Varcā from the Bhāgavata Purāṇa ॐ
- Chantotkania ॐ

=== D ===
- Daṇḍa - One of Sumālī's ten sons ॐ
- Devāntaka - One of Rāvaṇa's seven sons ॐ
- Dhūmrāksa - One of Sumālī's ten sons ॐ
- Dhoomralochana ॐ
- Durdama - A gandharva cursed by Vasiṣṭha to be a rakshasa for seventeen years ॐ
- Durgam ॐ
- Dūṣaṇa ॐ

=== E ===
- Ekajaṭā ॐ☸
- Elapatra - Dwells in the sun during the month of Srāvaṇa or Nabhas (Viṣṇu Purāṇa). Replaces Varya from the Bhāgavata Purāṇa ॐ

=== G ===
- Ghaṭotkaca - A half-rakshasa from the Mahābhārata ॐ

=== H ===
- Hari - One of the seventeen rakshasis invoked at the start of the Mahāmāyūrī Vidyārājñī Sūtra ☸
- Harikeśi - One of the seventeen rakshasis invoked at the start of the Mahāmāyūrī Vidyārājñī Sūtra ☸
- Haripiṅgale - One of the seventeen rakshasis invoked at the start of the Mahāmāyūrī Vidyārājñī Sūtra ☸
- Harīti - One of the seventeen rakshasis invoked at the start of the Mahāmāyūrī Vidyārājñī Sūtra ☸
- Heti - Dwells in the sun during the month of Madhu (Bhāgavata Purāṇa) or Chaitra (Viṣṇu Purāṇa) ॐ
- Hidimba ॐ
- Hiḍimbī ॐ

=== I ===
- Ilvala ॐ
- Indrajit - One of Rāvaṇa's seven sons. Another name of Meghanāda ॐ

=== J ===
- Jambūmālin - Killed by Hanuman ॐ
- Jarā - A rakshasi also known as Barmata or Bandi ॐ
- Jarāsandha ॐ
- Jaṭāsura ॐ
- Jāṭāsuri - Another name for Alaṁbuṣa ॐ

=== K ===
- Kabandha - A gandharva named Vishvavasu or Danu cursed by Indra or the sage Ashtavakra ॐ
- Kaikasī - One of Sumālī's four daughters Rāvaṇa's mother ॐ
- Kālakāmukha - One of Sumālī's ten sons ॐ
- Kālanemi - Rāvaṇa's uncle ॐ
- Kālapāśe - One of the seventeen rakshasis invoked at the start of the Mahāmāyūrī Vidyārājñī Sūtra ☸
- Kālaśodari - One of the seventeen rakshasis invoked at the start of the Mahāmāyūrī Vidyārājñī Sūtra ☸
- Kāli - One of the seventeen rakshasis invoked at the start of the Mahāmāyūrī Vidyārājñī Sūtra ☸
- Kalmāṣapāda - A king of the Ikshvaku dynasty cursed by the sage Vashishtha ॐ
- Kamalākṣi - One of the seventeen rakshasis invoked at the start of the Mahāmāyūrī Vidyārājñī Sūtra ☸
- Kamsa ॐ
- Karāli - One of the seventeen rakshasis invoked at the start of the Mahāmāyūrī Vidyārājñī Sūtra ☸
- Keśinī - One of the Ten Rakshasis of the Lotus Sutra ☸
- Khara ॐ
- Kirmīra ॐ
- Kumbha ॐ
- Kumbhakarṇa - One of Rāvaṇa's brothers ॐ
- Kumbhāṇḍi - One of the seventeen rakshasis invoked at the start of the Mahāmāyūrī Vidyārājñī Sūtra ☸
- Kumbhīnadī - One of Sumālī's four daughters ॐ
- Kuntī - One of the Ten Rakshasis of the Lotus Sutra ☸
- Kūṭadantī - One of the Ten Rakshasis of the Lotus Sutra ☸

=== L ===
- Lambā - One of the Ten Rakshasis of the Lotus Sutra ☸
- Laṃbe - One of the seventeen rakshasis invoked at the start of the Mahāmāyūrī Vidyārājñī Sūtra ☸

=== M ===
- Makhāpeta - Dwells in the sun during the month of Ūrja (Bhāgavata Purāṇa). Replaces Yajñāpeta from the Viṣṇu Purāṇa ॐ
- Makuṭadantī - One of the Ten Rakshasis of the Lotus Sutra ☸
- Mālādhārī - One of the Ten Rakshasis of the Lotus Sutra ☸
- Mālī - Sumālī's younger brother ॐ
- Mālyavant ॐ
- Mālyavān - Rāvaṇa's Chief Royal Adviser and Sumālī's elder brother ॐ
- Mandodari ॐ
- Māra - The prime antagonist in Buddhism, also known to be an asura or a deva ☸
- Mārīca - Ally of Rāvaṇa, killed by Rāma ॐ
- Malini ॐ
- Meghanāda - Another name of Indrajit ॐ

=== N ===
- Nairṛti - Guardian of the southwestern direction ॐ☸
- Narāntaka - One of Rāvaṇa's seven sons ॐ
- Nirṛtī - Mother of the rakshasas and guardian of the southwestern direction ॐ☸
- Nikumbha - One of Rāvaṇa's generals who led the rakshasas against the host of monkeys and was slain. ॐ
- Nikumbhilā ॐ

=== P ===
- Pauruṣeya - Dwells in the sun during the month of Śukra (Bhāgavata Purāṇa) or Jyēṣṭha or Śuci (Viṣṇu Purāṇa) ॐ
- Prākvāta - One of Sumālī's ten sons ॐ
- Prahasta (Rāvaṇa's son) - One of Rāvaṇa's seven sons ॐ
- Prahasta - One of Sumālī's ten sons ॐ
- Praheti - Dwells in the sun during the month of Mādhava (Bhāgavata Purāṇa) or Vaiśākha (Viṣṇu Purāṇa) ॐ
- Pralaṃbe - One of the seventeen rakshasis invoked at the start of the Mahāmāyūrī Vidyārājñī Sūtra ☸
- Puṣpadantī - One of the Ten Rakshasis of the Lotus Sutra ☸
- Puṣpotkaṭā - One of Sumālī's four daughters ॐ

=== R ===
- Rāvaṇa ॐ☸卐

=== S ===
- Sahajanya - Dwells in the sun during the month of Śuci (Bhāgavata Purāṇa). Replaces Budha from the Viṣṇu Purāṇa ॐ
- Sāṃhrāda - One of Sumālī's ten sons ॐ
- Śaṃkhini - One of the seventeen rakshasis invoked at the start of the Mahāmāyūrī Vidyārājñī Sūtra ☸
- Sarvasattvojohārī - One of the Ten Rakshasis of the Lotus Sutra ☸
- Śikhaṇḍī ॐ
- Sinhikha ॐ
- Śūrpaṇakhā - Rāvaṇa's sister ॐ
- Sphūrja - Dwells in the sun during the month of Pauṣa (Viṣṇu Purāṇa) or Puṣya (Bhāgavata Purāṇa) ॐ
- Śrīmati - One of the seventeen rakshasis invoked at the start of the Mahāmāyūrī Vidyārājñī Sūtra ☸
- Subāhu - Tāṛakā's son ॐ
- Sukeśa - Sumālī's father ॐ
- Sumālī - Rāvaṇa's maternal grandfather ॐ
- Supārśvā - One of Sumālī's ten sons ॐ
- samudri rakshasa - asura who lived in the underground water or sea/ocean ॐ

=== T ===
- Tāṛakā ॐ
- Trijaṭā ॐ
- Triśira - One of Rāvaṇa's seven sons ॐ

=== V ===
- Varcā - Dwells in the sun during the month of Tapasya (Bhāgavata Purāṇa). Replaces Cāpa from the Viṣṇu Purāṇa ॐ
- Varya - Dwells in the sun during the month of Nabhas (Bhāgavata Purāṇa). Replaces Elapatra from the Viṣṇu Purāṇa ॐ
- Vāta - Dwells in the sun during the month of Āśvin (Viṣṇu Purāṇa) or Tapas (Bhāgavata Purāṇa) ॐ
- Vekā - One of Sumālī's four daughters ॐ
- Vikaṭa - One of Sumālī's ten sons ॐ
- Vātāpi ॐ
- Vibhīṣaṇa - Rāvaṇa's younger brother ॐ
- Vidyucchatru - Dwells in the sun during the month of Sahas (Bhāgavata Purāṇa). Replaces Vidyut from the Viṣṇu Purāṇa ॐ
- Vidyut - Dwells in the sun during the month of Mārgaśīrṣa (Viṣṇu Purāṇa). Replaces Vidyucchatru from the Bhāgavata Purāṇa ॐ
- Vilambā - One of the Ten Rakshasis of the Lotus Sutra ☸
- Virādha ॐ
- Vyāghra - Dwells in the sun during the month of Bhādrapada (Viṣṇu Purāṇa) or Nabhasya (Bhāgavata Purāṇa) ॐ

=== Y ===
- Yajñāpeta - Dwells in the sun during the month of Phālguna (Viṣṇu Purāṇa). Replaces Makhāpeta from the Bhāgavata Purāṇa ॐ
- Yamadūti - One of the seventeen rakshasis invoked at the start of the Mahāmāyūrī Vidyārājñī Sūtra ☸
- Yamarākṣasi - One of the seventeen rakshasis invoked at the start of the Mahāmāyūrī Vidyārājñī Sūtra ☸

== Popular culture ==
- Rakshasa (Final Fantasy Brave Exvius)
- Princess Iron Fan - A character from the Journey to the West with the nickname Rākṣasī (羅剎女)
- Rākṣasa (羅剎) is a game piece in several Japanese variants of shōgi
- Rakshasa is mentioned in the movie World War Z as a fictional Hindi word for zombie.

== See also ==
- Asura
- Rakshasa (Dungeons & Dragons)
- Rigvedic deities
