= Bodhisattvas of the Earth =

Bodhisattvas mentioned in the Lotus Sutra

Bodhisattvas of the Earth (Chinese: 地涌菩薩; Japanese: 地涌の菩薩, 地湧の菩薩, 上行菩薩), also sometimes referred to as "Bodhisattvas from the Underground," "Bodhisattvas Taught by the Original Buddha," or "earth bodhisattvas," (Note: Jaffe: "welling-up-out-of-the-earth bodhisattvas") are the infinite number of bodhisattvas who, in the 15th ("Emerging from the Earth") chapter of the Lotus Sutra, emerged from a fissure in the ground. This pivotal story of the Lotus Sutra takes place during the "Ceremony in the Air" which had commenced in the 11th ("Emergence of the Treasure Tower") chapter. Later, in the 21st ("Supernatural Powers") chapter, Shakyamuni passes on to them the responsibility to keep and propagate the Lotus Sutra in the feared future era of the Latter Day of the Law.

== Description ==
In the 15th ("Emerging from the Earth") chapter of the Lotus Sutra, the vast number of bodhisattvas from other realms who had appeared to hear Shakyamuni preach in the "Ceremony in the Air" hoped to receive the Buddha's permission to be the ones to propagate the Dharma in the perilous era to come. (Note: Chapter 15 in Kumarajivas translation corresponds to chapter 14 ("Issuing of Bodhisattvas from the Gaps of the Earth") in the extant Sanskrit versions.) To their great chagrin, Shakyamuni refused their request, deferring this honor to unnamed bodhisattvas who already existed in the empty space underneath the sahā-world [tr: "world of endurance of suffering, any world of transmigration"]. Right after he made this statement the earth shook and a mighty fissure appeared. Dramatically, and in a single instant, bodhisattvas whose numbers are described in the sutra as "immeasurable, boundless, beyond anything that can be known through calculation, simile or parable" arose from the earth. All of them are "golden in hue, with the thirty-two features [of the Buddha] and an immeasurable brightness."

These bodhisattvas had four leaders and guiding teachers: Superior Practices (the leader of the four), Boundless Practices, Pure Practices, and Firmly Established Practices. The four leaders have been interpreted to represent the four bodhisattva vows as practiced by the Mahayana traditions of China, Japan, and Korea and are said to represent the four characteristics of Nirvana or Buddhahood as taught in the Lotus Sutra: true self, eternity, purity, and joy.

The same motif of countless bodhisattvas emerging from the earth occurs in the Tibetan edition of the Avaivartikacakra sutra.

== Interpretations ==
According to Tao Sheng (ca. 360–434), the splitting of the earth and the welling forth of the bodhisattvas is indicative that "living beings inherently possess an endowment for enlightenment, and it cannot remain concealed; they are bound to break the earth of defilements and emerge to safeguard the Dharma.”

The allegory of the Bodhisattvas of the Earth in the 15th-21st chapters of the Lotus Sutra has affected the outlooks and practices of numerous Buddhist schools. Although interpretations vary school by school, Thich Nhat Hanh provides a generalized reference: by rejecting the entreaties of bodhisattvas from other realms of the universe to propagate the Lotus Sutra after his death and by summoning countless bodhisattvas from under the earth, the Buddha affirms that he is from the world and the people of the world can rise to be its caretakers. In addition, he thus affirms the infinite universality of his life and the lives of all beings.

The welling forth of innumerable bodhisattvas from the earth has also been used as a metaphor for the emergence of a grassroots Buddhist movement. The metaphor of the Bodhisattvas of the Earth is also being used in secular and ecumenical writing.

=== In Nichiren Buddhism ===
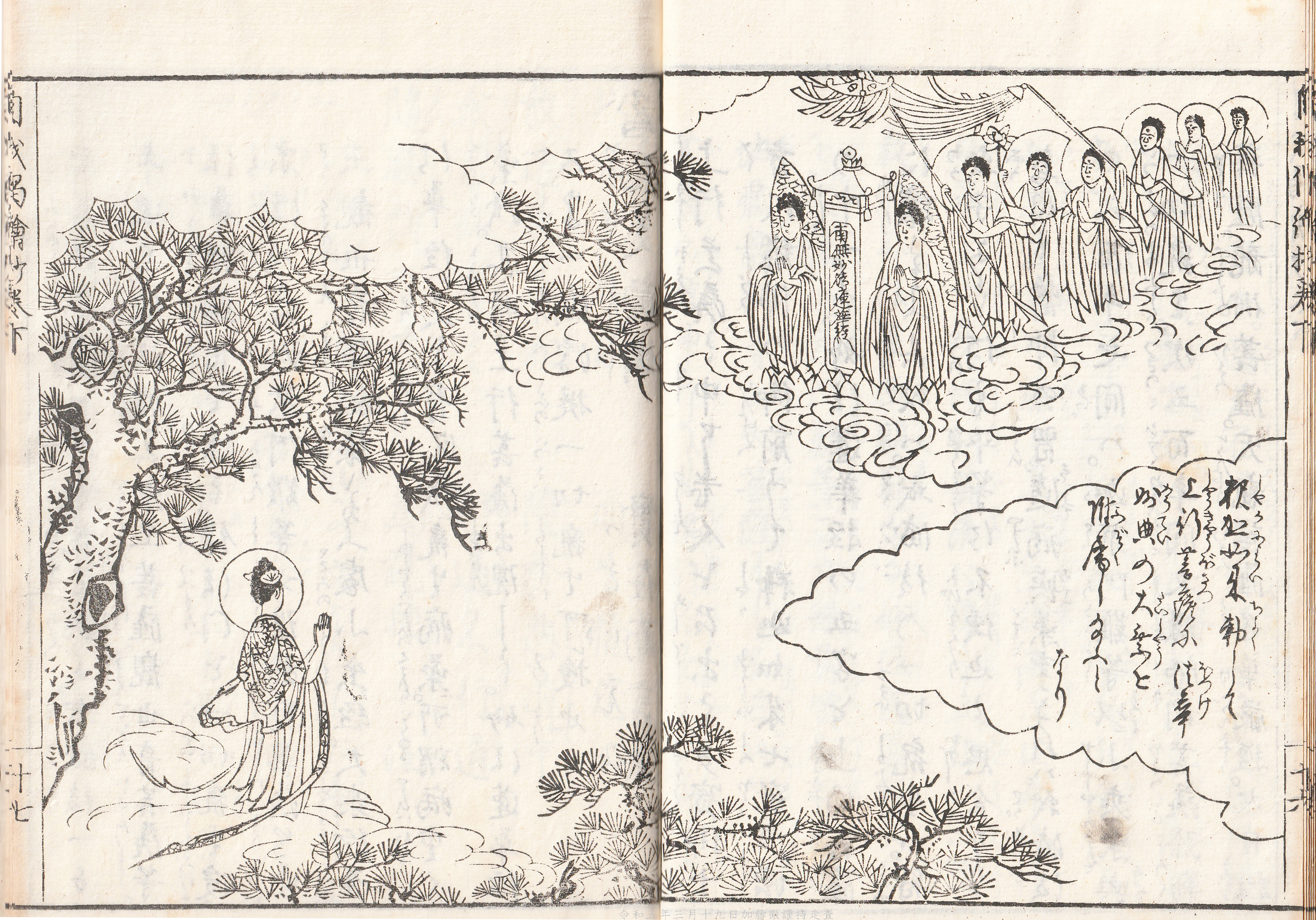
An illustration of JIGAGE E SHŌ, published in 1814, Kyoto

Whereas Nichiren Buddhists regard the first fourteen chapters as the transient or theoretical "Imprinted Gate," the "Emerging from the Earth" chapter (ch 15) is regarded as the opening of the Lotus Sutra's essential teachings (chapters 15-28), or the "Original Gate." The emergence of the Bodhisattvas of the Earth thus holds great significance. According to Kyōtsū Hori, "they are also called honge no bosatsu meaning bodhisattvas guided by the Original Buddha in the eternal past." Nichiren (1222–1282) self-identified himself as Bodhisattva Superior Practices, in several of his writings such as "The Opening of the Eyes." He claimed to qualify for this designation as the one who first grasped and taught the Mystic Law of Nam-myoho-renge-kyo in the Latter Day.

The four leaders of the Bodhisattvas of the Earth are represented on the top row of the Gohonzon, the calligraphic mandala inscribed by Nichiren, flanking the characters for Shakyamuni and Taho (Many Treasures) Buddhas.

In his letter "The True Aspect of All Phenomena," Nichiren clearly stated that followers of his who spread and promote his teachings are fellow Bodhisattvas of the Earth: "There should be no discrimination among those who propagate the five characters of Myoho-renge-kyo in the Latter Day of the Law, be they men or women. Were they not Bodhisattvas of the Earth, they could not chant the daimoku. At first only Nichiren chanted Nam-myoho-renge-kyo, but then two, three, and a hundred followed, chanting and teaching others. Propagation will unfold this way in the future as well. Does this not signify 'emerging from the earth'?"

The importance of the appearance of the Bodhisattvas of the Earth is underscored in most Nichiren schools: Soka Gakkai, Nichiren Shū, and Nichiren Shoshu. The differing interpretations of how the Bodhisattvas of the Earth correspond to contemporary people are described below:

==== Nichiren Shu ====
Nichiren Shu states that its members aspire to the status of Bodhisattvas of the Earth.

==== Soka Gakkai ====
The Soka Gakkai holds that all people who propagate the ideals of the Lotus Sutra are Bodhisattvas of the Earth. This realization is traced back to Josei Toda's vision while imprisoned during World War II under the charge of lèse-majesté in which he recognized himself as one of the Bodhisattvas of the Earth. Daisaku Ikeda, president of the Soka Gakkai International, often describes Soka Gakkai members as the present-day Bodhisattvas of the Earth.

==== Nichiren Shoshu ====
Nichiren Shoshu refers to its believers as "associates of the Bodhisattvas of the Earth," "sharing karmic bonds with the Bodhisattvas of the Earth," or as "followers of the Bodhisattvas of the Earth." There are occasional references to the laity and priests of Nichiren Shoshu being the Bodhisattvas of the Earth.

=== In Lotus Sutra schools ===
According to the Risshō Kōsei Kai, the appearance of the Bodhisattvas of the Earth represent a shift from teachings of theory in the first half of the Lotus Sutra to teachings about conduct and human action, teachings that are applicable to life today. (Note: Nikkyō Niwano: "The first half of the Lotus Sutra was given over largely to the teaching of reason and truth, the teaching of wisdom. But upon completion of that half of the sutra, we had the abrupt appearance of a countless throng of bodhisattvas who were doers. Any teaching without application in practice, in conduct, is nothing. It must move on to the stage of action. True bodhisattvas are the doers who apply their knowledge of the true aspect of all reality, the statement of which truth is the theme of the first half of the Lotus Sutra. They are the doers who, in their compassionate conduct, exemplify the truth of the buddha-nature identity: the kind of persons who make the teaching of the Buddha meaningful in this world. Since this so precisely applies to us who are alive today, it is important to take the message to heart.") Reeves suggests that the massive emergence of the Bodhisattvas from the Earth, born from the ground of daily life, is an ongoing process, not a one-time story. (Note: Reeves: "The text says that the four groups, the monks and nuns, laymen and laywomen, could see these bodhisattvas "by the divine powers of the Buddha." This is another way of referring to the human imagination, to the power that we all have to transcend everyday life, the power to see the buddha in others.")

Nikkyo Niwano describes a humanistic tone to the ways the emerging bodhisattvas greet the Buddha, inquiring about his health and the receptions of people to his teachings. The implication is that the Buddha, as a religion founder, is not a godhead or the recipient of a divine revelation. Rather, his enlightenment stemmed from his own personal efforts. (Note: Reeves: "In this respect, Buddhism...is quite different from most, perhaps all, other religions.")

=== In the Sōtō Zen school ===
Dōgen, the founder of the Japanese Sōtō Zen school, made more references to the Lotus Sutra in his commentaries than any other sutras. His commentaries focused primarily on the 15th (Emerging from the Earth) and 16th (Life Span) Chapters of the Lotus Sutra. Dōgen made numerous speculations about the significance of the bodhisattvas who emerged from the underground.

As conceived by Dōgen, the stories of the underground bodhisattvas and the Buddha's inconceivable life-span serve as a fundamental shift in the development of East Asian Mahayana understanding of Buddhahood, an immediate attainment based on fundamental awakening rather than an achievement based on lifetimes of arduous practice. This can be conceived as "Shortening the Path" or a transition from a "progress philosophy" to a "leap philosophy."

== Bibliography ==
- Hiroshi Kanno (2010), Bodhisattvas of the Earth in the Lotus Sutra: Involvement in the Human Society. The Journal of Oriental Studies 20, 108-128
