= Rakshasa =

Race in Hindu mythology

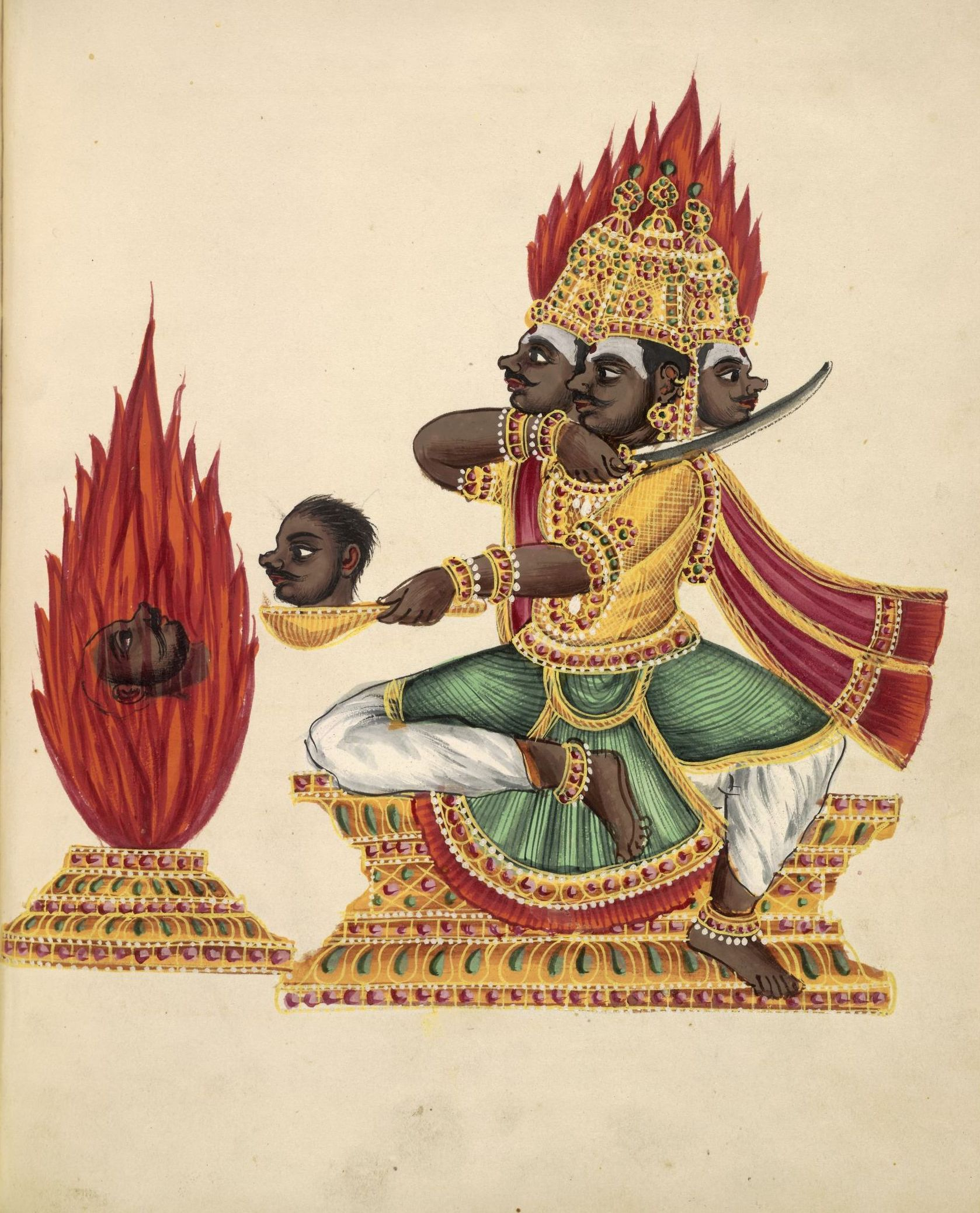
- Illustration of the three-headed rakshasa Trisiras sitting in lalitasana on a throne facing a fire altar in which a severed head is burning, 1830

Creature information
- Other names: Asura; Nri-chakshas; Nishacharas; Kravyads; Rakshasi; Manushya-rakshasi
- Grouping: Demigod
- Folklore: Hinduism; Buddhist mythology

Rakshasa (Sanskrit: राक्षस, pronounced [ɾɑːk.ʂɐ.s̪ɐ], romanized: rākṣasa; Pali: rakkhasa; lit. 'demon' or 'fiend') are a race of usually malevolent beings prominently featured in Hinduism, Buddhism, Jainism, and Indonesian folk Islam. They reside on Earth but possess supernatural powers, which they usually use for evil acts such as disrupting Vedic sacrifices or eating humans.

The term is also used to describe asuras, a class of power-seeking beings that oppose the benevolent devas. They are often depicted as antagonists in Hindu scriptures, as well as in Buddhism and Jainism. The feminine form of rakshasa is rakshasi (राक्षसी, IPA: [ɾɑːk.ʂɐ.s̪iː], rākṣasī).

== Hinduism ==
=== In Puranas ===
Brahmā, in a form composed of the quality of foulness, produced hunger, of whom anger was born: and the god put forth in darkness beings emaciate with hunger, of hideous aspects, and with long beards. Those beings hastened to the deity. Such of them as exclaimed, "Oh preserve us!" were thence called Rākṣasas. Those created beings, overwhelmed by hunger, attempted to seize the waters. Those among them who said, "we shall protect these waters", are remembered as Rākṣasas.

=== Description ===
Rakshasas were most often depicted as shape-shifting, fierce-looking, enormous, monstrous-looking creatures, with two fangs protruding from the top of the mouth and having sharp, claw-like fingernails. They were shown as being mean, growling beasts, and as insatiable man-eaters that could smell the scent of human flesh. Some of the more ferocious ones were shown with flaming red eyes and hair, drinking blood with their cupped hands or from human skulls (similar to representations of vampires in later Western mythology). Generally, they could fly, vanish, and had maya (magical powers of illusion), which enabled them to change size at will and assume the form of any creature.

=== In Hindu epics ===
In the world of the Ramayana and Mahabharata, Rakshasas were a populous race. There were both good and evil rakshasas, and as warriors, they fought alongside the armies of both good and evil. They were powerful warriors, expert magicians and illusionists. As shape-changers, they could assume different physical forms. As illusionists, they were capable of creating appearances which were real to those who believed in them or who failed to dispel them. Some of the rakshasas were said to be man-eaters and made their gleeful appearance when the slaughter on a battlefield was at its worst. Occasionally, they served as rank-and-file soldiers in the service of one or another warlord.

Aside from their treatment of unnamed rank-and-file Rakshasas, the epics tell the stories of certain members of these beings who rose to prominence, sometimes as heroes but more often as villains.

Thapar suggests that the Rakshasas could represent exaggerated, supernatural depictions of demonised forest-dwellers who were outside the caste society.

==== In the Rāmāyaṇa ====
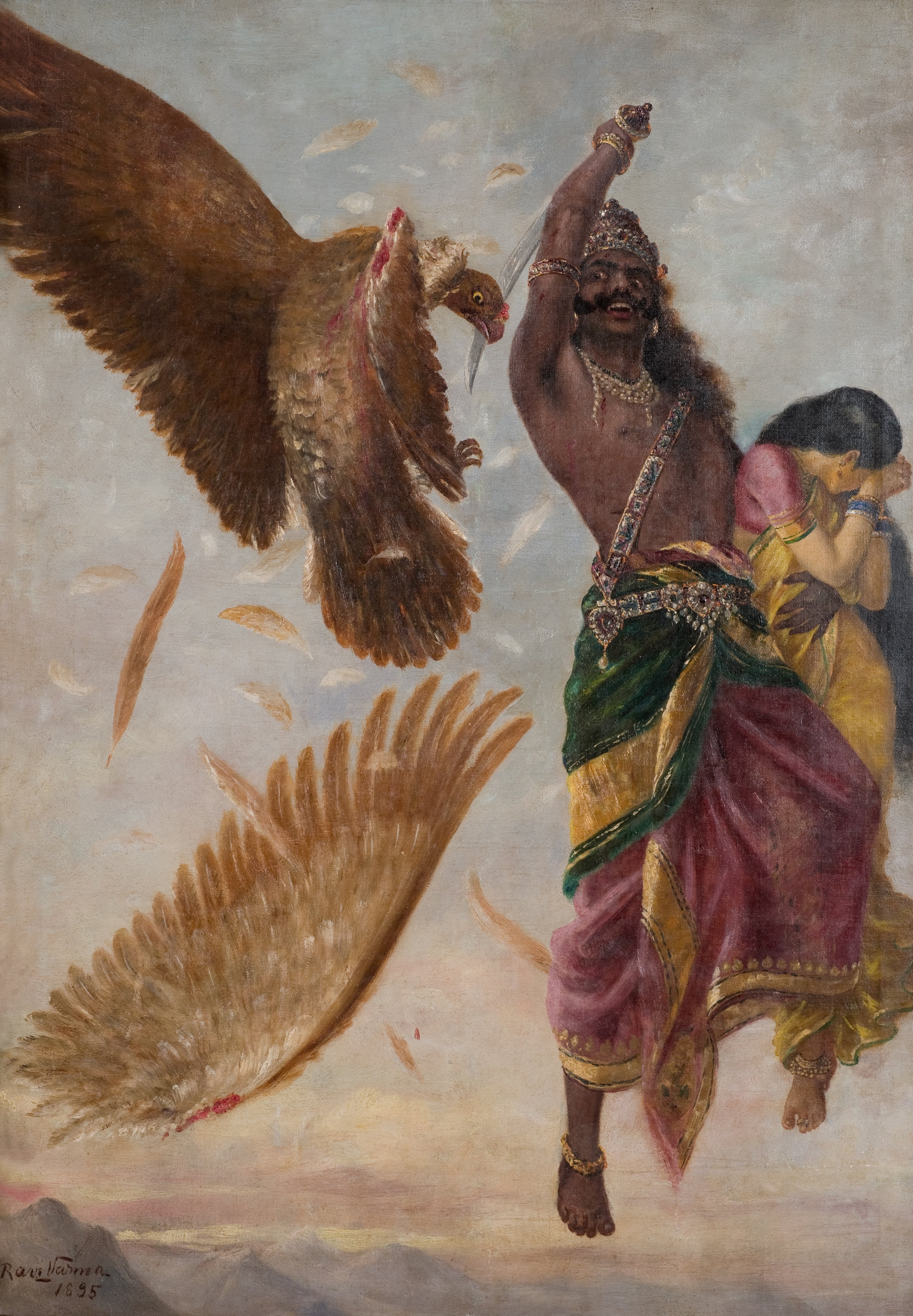
Painting depicting Ravana, the king of rākṣasas, cutting off Jatayu's wing while abducting Sita, by Raja Ravi Varma

In books 3-6 of the Rāmāyaṇa, the rākṣasas are the main antagonists of the narrative. The protagonist Rāma slays many rākṣasas throughout the epic, including Tāṭakā, Mārīca, and Rāvaṇa. In the epic, the rākṣasas are portrayed as mainly demonic beings who are aggressive and sexual. They can assume any form they wish, which Rāvaṇa uses to good effect to trick and kidnap Sītā, Rāma's wife, which drives the rest of the narrative. The rākṣasas reside in the forests south of the Gangetic plain and in the island fortress of Laṅkā, both far away from the lands of Kosala and the home of Rāma. In Laṅkā, the capital of Rāvaṇa, the rākṣasas live in a complex society comparable to the humans of Ayodhyā, where some rākṣasas, such as Vibhīṣaṇa are moral beings.

==== In the Mahabharata ====
The Mahabharata describes several encounters between the Pandava, Bhima and Rakshasas. Rakshasa heroes fought on both sides in the Kurukshetra war.

- Bhima killed Hidimba, a Rakshasa described as strong and cannibalistic. When Hidimba saw the Pandavas sleeping in his forest, he decided to eat them. He sent his sister Hidimbi to assess the situation. She fell in love with Bhima and warned him of the danger. Hidimba confronted Bhima and was subsequently killed.
- Ghatotkacha, a Rakshasa who fought on the side of the Pandavas, was the son of Bhima and the Rakshasi Hidimbi. Bhima killed Hidimbi's brother, the Rakshasa Hidimba.
- Bakasura was a cannibalistic forest-dwelling Rakshasa who terrorised the nearby human population by forcing them to take turns making him regular deliveries of food, including human victims. The Pandavas travelled into the area and took up residence with a local Brahmin family. Their turn came when they had to make a delivery to Bakasura, and they debated who among them should be sacrificed. The rugged Bhima volunteered to take care of the matter. Bhima went into the forest with the food delivery (consuming it on the way to annoy Bakasura). He engaged Bakasura in a ferocious wrestling match and broke his back. The human townspeople were amazed and grateful. The local Rakshasas begged for mercy, which Bhima granted them on the condition that they give up cannibalism. The Rakshasas agreed and soon acquired a reputation for being peaceful towards humans.
- Kirmira, the brother of Bakasura, was a cannibal and master illusionist. He haunted the wood of Kamyaka, dining on human travellers. Like his brother before him, Kirmira also made the mistake of fighting the Pandav hero Bhima, who killed him with his bare hands.
- Jatasura was a cunning Rakshasa who, disguised as a Brahmin, attempted to steal the Pandavas' weapons and to ravish Draupadi, wife of the five Pandavas. Bhima arrived in time to intervene and killed Jatasur in a duel. Jatasur's son was Alamvush, who fought on the side of the Kauravas at Kurukshetra.
- Alamvusha was a Rakshasa skilled at fighting with both conventional weapons and the powers of illusion. According to the Mahabharata, he fought on the side of the Kauravas. Arjuna defeated him in a duel, as did Arjuna's son Abhimanyu. But Alamvusha in turn killed Iravan, Arjuna's son by a Nāga princess Ulupi, when the Rakshasa used his powers of illusion to take on the form of Garuda. Alamvusha was also defeated by Bhima. He was slain by Bhima's son, the Rakshasa Ghatotkacha.

== Buddhism ==
Many Rakshasas appear in various Buddhist Scriptures. In Chinese tradition rakshasa are known as luosha (羅刹/罗刹). In Japan, they are known as rasetsu (羅刹).

Chapter 26 of the Lotus Sutra includes a dialogue between the Buddha and a group of rakshasa daughters, who swear to uphold and protect the Lotus Sutra. They also teach magical dhāraṇīs to protect followers who also uphold the sutra.

Five rakshasa are part of Mahakala's retinue. They are Kala and Kali, husband and wife, and their offspring Putra, Bhatri and Bharya.

The Lankavatara Sutra mentions the island of Sri Lanka as land of Rakshasas. Their king is the Rakshasa called Ravana, who invites Buddha to Sri Lanka to deliver the sermon in the land. There are other Rakshasas from the land, such as Wibisana, who is believed to be the brother of Ravana in Sri Lankan Buddhist mythology.

In The Lotus-Born: The Life Story of Padmasambhava, recorded by Yeshe Tsogyal, Padmasambhava receives the nickname of "Rakshasa" during one of his wrathful conquests to subdue Buddhist heretics.

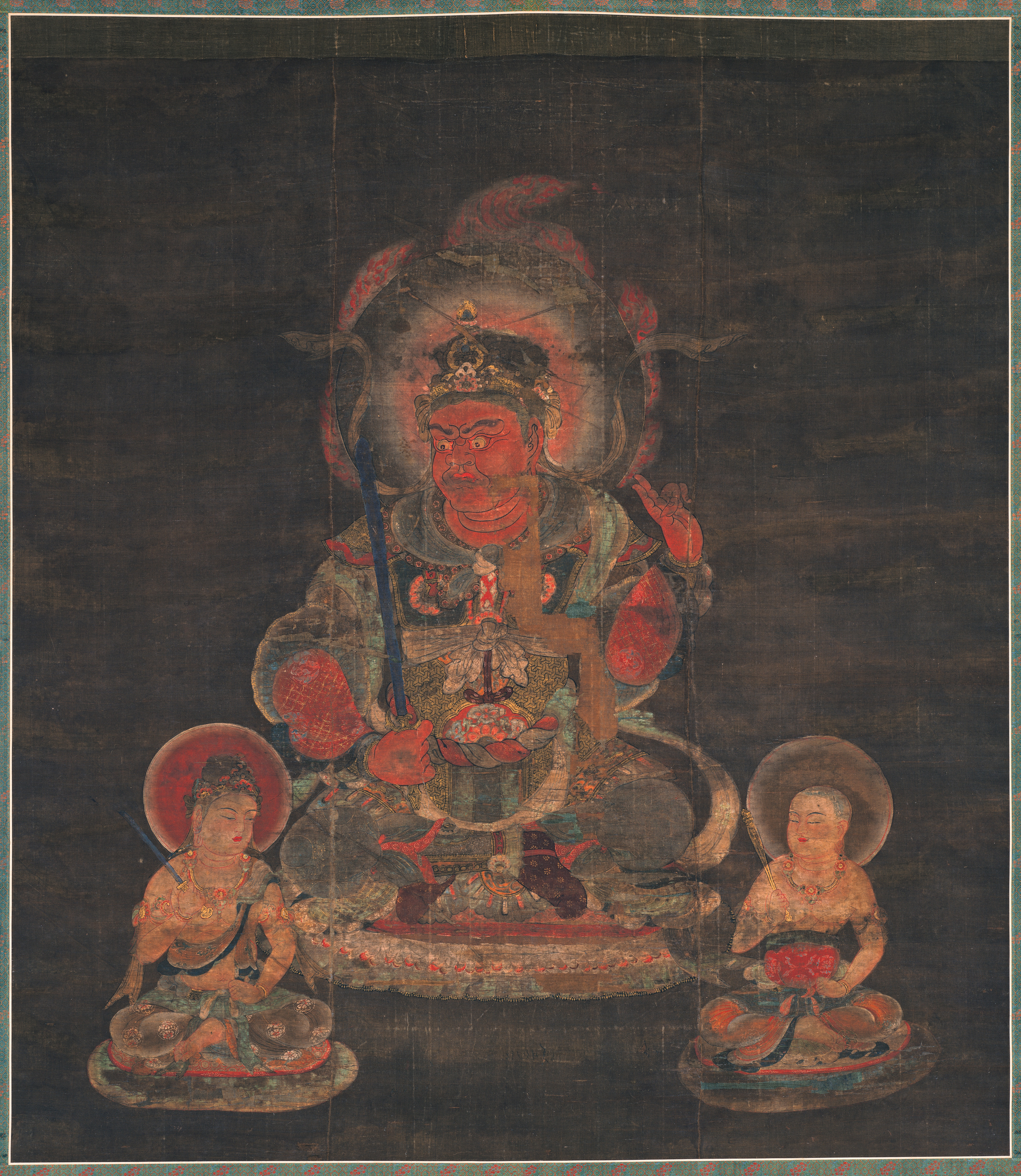
Painting of Rakshasa as one of the Twelve Devas of the Vajrayana tradition.
Japan, Heian period, 1127 CE.

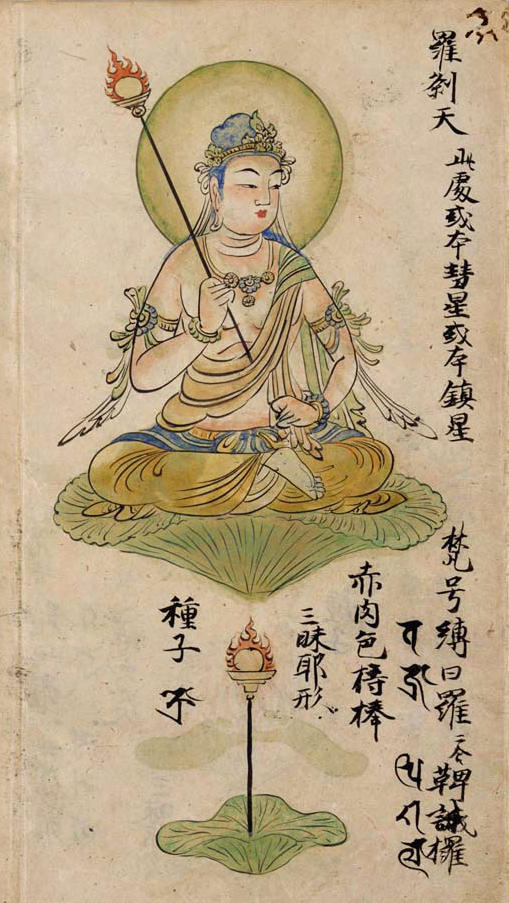
Rakshasa as a single deity, depicted on a page from a folio describing deities from the Diamond Realm and Womb Realm.
Japan, Heian period, 12th century.

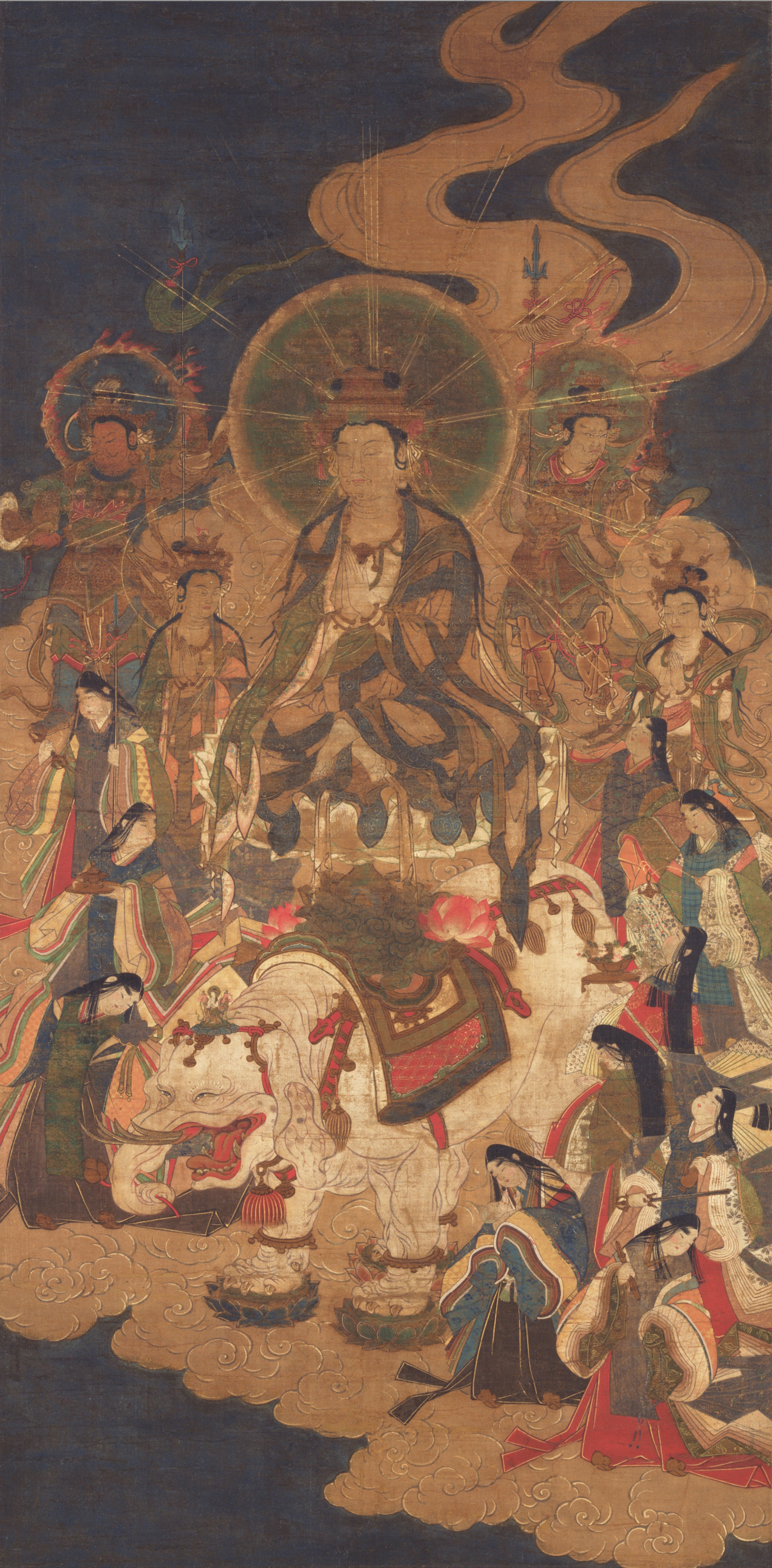
Painting of Samantabhadra accompanied by the Ten Rākṣasīs.
Japan, Kamakura period (1185–1333).

== Jainism ==
Jain accounts vary from the Hindu accounts of Rakshasa. According to Jain literature, Rakshasa was a kingdom of civilised and vegetarian people belonging to the race of Vidyadhara, who were devotees of Tirthankara.

== Islam ==
Kejawèn-influenced Indonesian Muslims view the Rakshasas as the result of people whose soul is replaced by the spirit of a devil (shayāṭīn). The devils are envious of humans and thus attempt to possess their bodies and minds. If they succeed, the human adapts to the new soul and gains their qualities, turning the person into a Rakshasa.

== Artistic and folkloric depictions ==
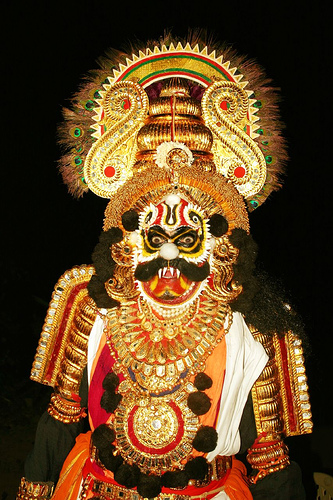
Rakshasa as depicted in Yakshagana, an art form of Uttara Kannada. Artist: Krishna Hasyagar, Karki

The artists of Angkor in Cambodia frequently depicted Ravana in stone sculpture and bas-relief. The "Nāga bridge" at the entrance to the 12th-century city of Angkor Thom is lined with large stone statues of Devas and Asuras engaged in churning the Ocean of Milk. The ten-headed Ravana is shown anchoring the line of Asuras.

A bas-relief at the 12th-century temple of Angkor Wat depicts the figures churning the ocean. It includes Ravana anchoring the line of Asuras that are pulling on the serpent's head. Scholars have speculated that one of the figures in the line of Devas is Ravana's brother Vibhishana. They pull on a serpent's tail to churn the Ocean of Milk. Another bas-relief at Angkor Wat shows a 20-armed Ravana shaking Mount Kailasa.

The artists of Angkor also depicted the Battle of Lanka between the Rakshasas under the command of Ravana and the Vanaras or monkeys under the command of Rama and Sugriva. The 12th-century Angkor Wat contains a dramatic bas-relief of the Battle of Lanka between Ravana's Rakshasas and Rama's monkeys. Ravana is depicted with ten heads and twenty arms, mounted on a chariot drawn by creatures that appear to be a mixture of horse, lion, and bird. Vibhishana is shown standing behind and aligned with Rama and his brother Lakshmana. Kumbhakarna, mounted on a similar chariot, is shown fighting Sugriva.

This battle is also depicted in a less refined bas-relief at the 12th-century temple of Preah Khan.

At the 19th century Klungkung Royal Gate of Bali, there are six lifelike statues of Rakshasa. These can be identified as depictions of Rakshasa because of their fangs and role as Gate guardian in Balinese architecture, but also as Europeans (specifically the Dutch) because of their beards and western clothing style. The association with Rakshasa likens the Dutch to greedy, violent monsters, but their position as gate guardians also positions them as capable of being controlled by the Balinese kings.

== In fiction ==
Rakshasa have long been a race of villains in the Dungeons & Dragons role-playing game. They appear as animal-headed humanoids (generally with tiger or monkey heads) with their hands inverted (the palms of its hands are where the backs of the hands would be on a human). They are masters of necromancy, enchantment and illusion (which they mostly use to disguise themselves) and are very hard to kill, especially due to their partial immunity to magical effects. They ravenously prey upon humans as food and dress themselves in fine clothing. This version of the rakshasa was heavily inspired by an episode of Kolchak: The Night Stalker.

Rakshasa appears in the Unicorn: Warriors Eternal episode "Darkness Before Dawn". He is a humanoid tiger similar to the D&D depiction. This version is a fierce but benevolent guardian of the jungle who allies with Merlin against the Evil.

In the film World War Z, Rakshasa were mentioned in reference to the zombies in India.

In the Korean comic "Special Civil Servant" the most ferocious enemies are known as the rakshasas, being of extreme evil and ugliness.

== In languages ==
In Indonesian and Malaysian variants of Malay which have significant Sanskrit influence, raksasa now means "giant", "gigantic", "huge and strong"; the Malaysian variant recognises the word as an equivalent to "monster", whereas the Indonesian variant uses it more in colloquial usage.

== See also ==
- Asura
- Brahmarakshasa
- Daitya
- Danava
- List of Rakshasas
- Ogre
- Oni
- Troll
- Wrath of Rakshasa (Six Flags Great America Dive Coaster)

== General and cited references ==
- Freeman, Michael; Jacques, Claude (2003). Ancient Angkor. Bangkok: River Books.
- Rovedo, Vittorio (1997). Khmer Mythology: Secrets of Angkor. New York: Weatherhill.
