= Viśiṣṭacāritra =

Bodhisattva in the Lotus Sutra

- Sanskrit: विशिष्टचारित्र; Viśiṣṭacāritra
- Chinese: 上行菩薩 (Pinyin: Shàngxíng Púsà)
- Japanese: 上行菩薩(じょうぎょうぼさつ) (romaji: Jōgyō Bosatsu)
- Khmer: វិសិស្តចារិត្រ (vi-ses-chaa-reut)
- Korean: 상행보살 (RR: Sanghaeng Bosal)
- Tagalog: Bisistakalitla
- Tibetan: སྤྱོད་པ་ཁྱད་པར་ཅན་ Wylie: spyod pa khyad par can
- Vietnamese: Thượng Hạnh Bồ Tát

Information
- Venerated by: Mahāyāna, Vajrayāna

Viśiṣṭacāritra (Sanskrit: विशिष्टचारित्र; also known as Superior Practice) is a bodhisattva mentioned in the 15th, 21st, and 22nd chapters of the Lotus Sutra. He is one of the four great perfected bodhisattvas who attends Gautama Buddha and protects the Lotus Sutra and its devotees. The other three are Anantacaritra, Visuddhacaritra, and Supratisthitacaritra; together they make up the four great primarily evolved bodhisattvas. Viśiṣṭacāritra is also believed to represent the "true self" characteristic of buddhahood, which is the selflessness of Nirvana.

== In Nichiren Buddhism ==
In most schools of Nichiren Buddhism, Nichiren is believed to have fulfilled the vow of Viśiṣṭacāritra during his lifetime. This is because he revealed what he held to be the Superior Practice of chanting the title (daimoku) of the Lotus Sutra, Namu Myōhō Renge Kyō, which would quickly allow all beings to attain enlightenment in their present lifetime, no matter what their capacities. According to Anesaki, from the time of his exile to Sado Island Nichiren deemed himself as the reincarnation of Viśiṣṭacāritra.

=== Nichiren Shōshū, Soka Gakkai and Kempon Hokke ===
In Nichiren Shōshū, Soka Gakkai and the Kempon Hokke schools, Nichiren is revered as the reincarnation of Viśiṣṭacāritra because he revealed the "cause" of Buddhahood: chanting "Namu Myōhō Renge Kyō", a practice called daimoku, whereas Gautama is seen as the "Buddha of True Effect" as he only revealed the "effect" of Buddhahood. This is based on the passage in Chapter 16 of the Lotus Sutra that reads, "Originally I [Shakyamuni Buddha] practiced the bodhisattva way, and the life that I acquired then has yet to come to an end" Nichiren Shōshū and Soka Gakkai interpret the passage to mean that Gautama Buddha must have practiced something to attain Buddhahood, but in the Lotus Sutra he did not reveal what that practice was, whereas Nichiren taught the daimoku, which leads all beings to Buddhahood.

These groups conclude Shakyamuni Buddha attained buddhahood in the remote past through the daimoku. The Object of Devotion for Observing the Mind states, "Showing profound compassion for those unable to comprehend the gem of the doctrine of three thousand realms in a single moment of life, the Buddha wrapped it within the five characters [of Myōhō Renge Kyō], with which he then adorned the necks of the ignorant people of the latter age.
