= Viśuddhacāritra =

Bodhisattvas mentioned in the Lotus Sutra

- Sanskrit: विशुद्धचारित्र; Viśuddhacāritra
- Chinese: 淨行菩薩 (Pinyin: Jìngxíng Púsà)
- Japanese: 浄行菩薩(じょうぎょうぼさつ) (romaji: Jōgyō Bosatsu)
- Khmer: វិសុទ្ធចារិត្រ (vi-sut-chaa-reut)
- Korean: 정행보살 (RR: Jeonghaeng Bosal)
- Tagalog: Bisuddhakaritla
- Tibetan: སྤྱོད་པ་རྣམ་པར་དག་ Wylie: spyod pa rnam par dag
- Vietnamese: Tịnh Hạnh Bồ Tát

Information
- Venerated by: Mahāyāna, Vajrayāna

Viśuddhacāritra (Sanskrit: विशुद्धचारित्र; also known as Pure Practice) is one of the four great primarily or eternally evolved bodhisattvas mentioned in the 15th chapter of the Lotus Sutra. He is considered to represent the "purity" characteristic of buddhahood, "Nirvana's freedom from all that is impure."

== See also ==
- Supratisthitacaritra
- Visistacaritra
