= Supratisthitacaritra =

Bodhisattva mentioned in the Lotus Sutra

Supratiṣṭhitacāritra
- Sanskrit: सुप्रतिष्ठितचारित्र; Supratiṣṭhitacāritra
- Chinese: 安立行菩薩 (Pinyin: Ānlìxíng Púsà)
- Japanese: 安立行菩薩(あんりゅうぎょうぼさつ) (romaji: Anryūgyō Bosatsu)
- Khmer: សុប្រទិស្ឋិតចារិត្រ (so-prati-theut-chaa-reut)
- Korean: 안립행보살 (RR: Anriphaeng Bosal)
- Tagalog: Suplatisthitakalitla
- Tibetan: སྤྱོད་པ་བརྟན་པ་ Wylie: spyod pa brtan pa
- Vietnamese: An Lập Hạnh Bồ Tát

Information
- Venerated by: Mahāyāna, Vajrayāna

Supratiṣṭhitacāritra (Sanskrit: सुप्रतिष्ठितचारित्र; also known as Firm Practice) is one of the four great perfected bodhisattvas mentioned in the 15th chapter of the Lotus Sutra. He is believed to represent the "bliss" characteristic of Buddhahood, which is the liberation from suffering.
