= Sixteen Arhats =

List of the Buddha's disciples in South and East Asian tradition

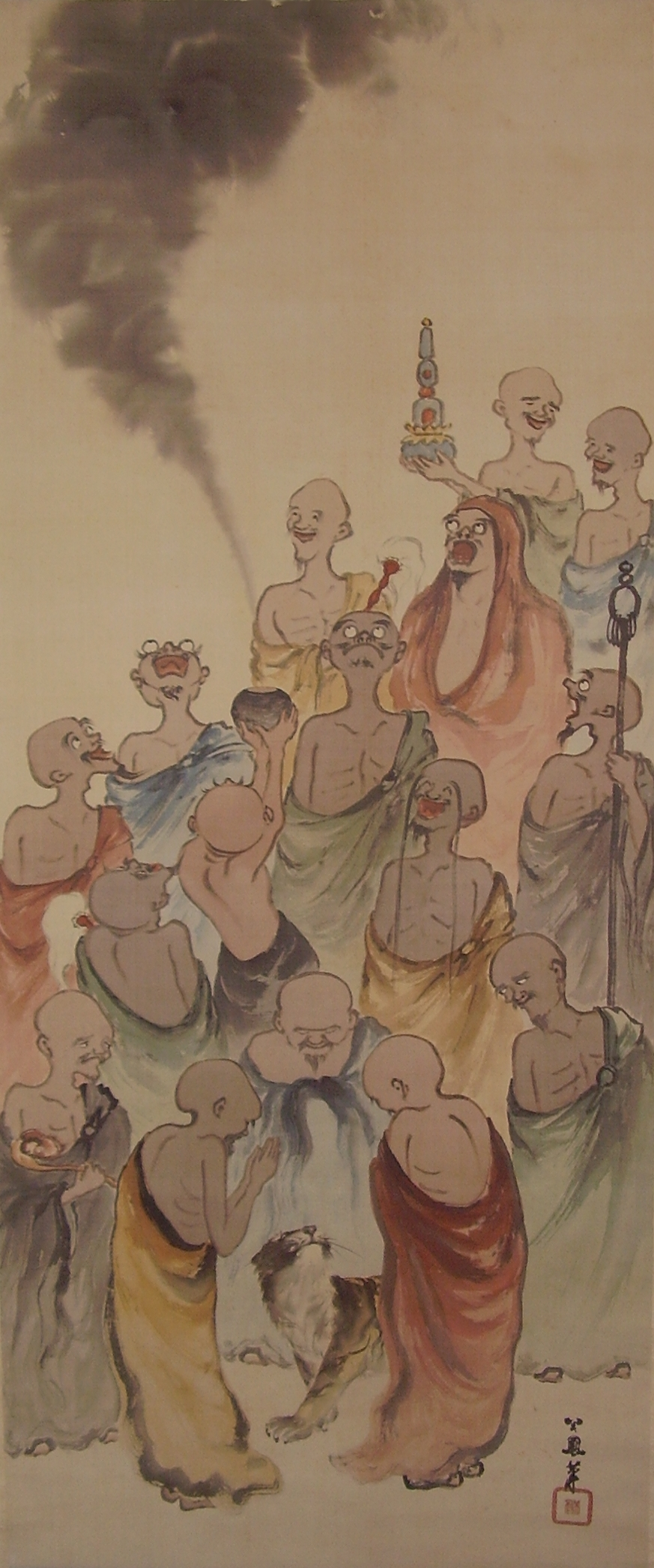
The 16 Arhats, with various associated symbolic items; as depicted in a "gentle caricature" style Japanese painting, late 19th - early 20th century

The Sixteen Arhats (Chinese: 十六羅漢, pinyin: Shíliù Luóhàn, Rōmaji: Jūroku Rakan; Tibetan: གནས་བརྟན་བཅུ་དྲུག, "Neten Chudrug") are a group of legendary Arhats in Buddhism. The grouping of sixteen Arhats was brought to China, and later to Tibet, from India. In China, an expanded group of Eighteen Arhats later became much more popular, but worship of the sixteen Arhats still continues to the present day in China, Japan and Tibet. In Japan sixteen Arhats are particularly popular in Zen Buddhism, where they are treated as examples of behaviour. In Tibet, the sixteen Arhats, also known as sixteen sthaviras ('elders') are the subject of a liturgical practice associated with the festival of the Buddha's birth, composed by the Kashmiri teacher Shakyahribhadra (1127-1225). They are also well represented in Tibetan art.

The sixteen Arhats are:

Sanskrit	Chinese	Pinyin	Rōmaji	Tibetan	Tibetan pronunciation
Piṇḍola Bhāradvāja	賓度羅跋囉惰闍尊者	Bīndùluóbáluōduòdū zūnzhě	Bindorabaradaja sonja	བྷ་ར་དྭ་ཛ་སོ་ཉོམ་ལེན	Bharadwadza Sönyom Le
Kanakavatsa	迦諾迦伐蹉尊者	Jiānuòjiāfácuō zūnzhě	Kanakabassa sonja	གསེར་གྱི་བེའུ	Sergyi Be'u
Kanaka Bhāradvāja/Kanaka	迦諾迦跋釐堕闍尊者	Jiānuòjiābálíduòdū zūnzhě	Kanakabarudaja sonja	བྷ་ར་དྭ་ཛ་་གསེར་ཅན	Baradwadza Serchen/Serchen
Subinda/Abhedya	蘇頻陀尊者	Sūpíntuó zūnzhě	Sobinda sonja	མི་ཕྱེད་པ	Michepa
Nakula/Bakula	諾距羅尊者	Nuòjùluó zūnzhě	Nakora sonja	བ་ཀུ་ལ	Bakula
Śrībhadra/Bhadra	跋陀羅尊者	Bátuóluó zūnzhě	Badara sonja	བཟང་པོ	Pal Zangpo
Mahākālika/Kālika	迦哩迦尊者	Jiālījiā zūnzhě	Karika sonja	དུས་ལྡན	Düden Chenpo
Vajriputra	伐闍羅弗多羅尊者	Fádūluófúduōluó zūnzhě	Bajarafutara sonja/Bajarahottara sonja	རྡོ་རྗེ་མོའི་བུ	Dorje Möbu
Gopaka/Jīvaka	戎博迦尊者	Róngbójiā zūnzhě	Jubaka sonja	སྦྱེ་བྱེད་པ	Bé Chépa
Panthaka	半託迦尊者	Bàntuōjiā zūnzhě	Hantaka sonja	ལམ་བསྟན	Lamchenten
Rāhula	囉怙羅尊者	Luōhùluó zūnzhě	Ragora sonja	སྒྲ་གཅན་འཛིན	Drachen Dzin
Nāgasena	那伽犀那尊者	Nàjiāxīnà zūnzhě	Nagasaina sonja	ཀླུ་སྡེ	Lü Dé
Aṅgaja	因掲陀尊者	Yīnjiētuó zūnzhě	Ingada sonja	ཡན་ལག་འབྱུང	Yenlak Jung
Vanavāsin	伐那婆斯尊者	Fánàpósī zūnzhě	Banabashi sonja	ནགས་ན་གནས	Nagnanepa
Ajita	阿氏多尊者	Āshìduō zūnzhě	Ajita sonja	མ་ཕམ་པ	Ma Phampa
Cūḍapanthaka/Kṣudrapanthaka	注荼半吒迦尊者	Zhùtúbànzhājiā zūnzhě	Chudahantaka sonja	ལམ་ཕྲན་བསྟན	Lamtren Ten

Ming dynasty painting scroll of the Sixteen Arhats by Wu Bin. China. Currently held in the Metropolitan Museum of Art

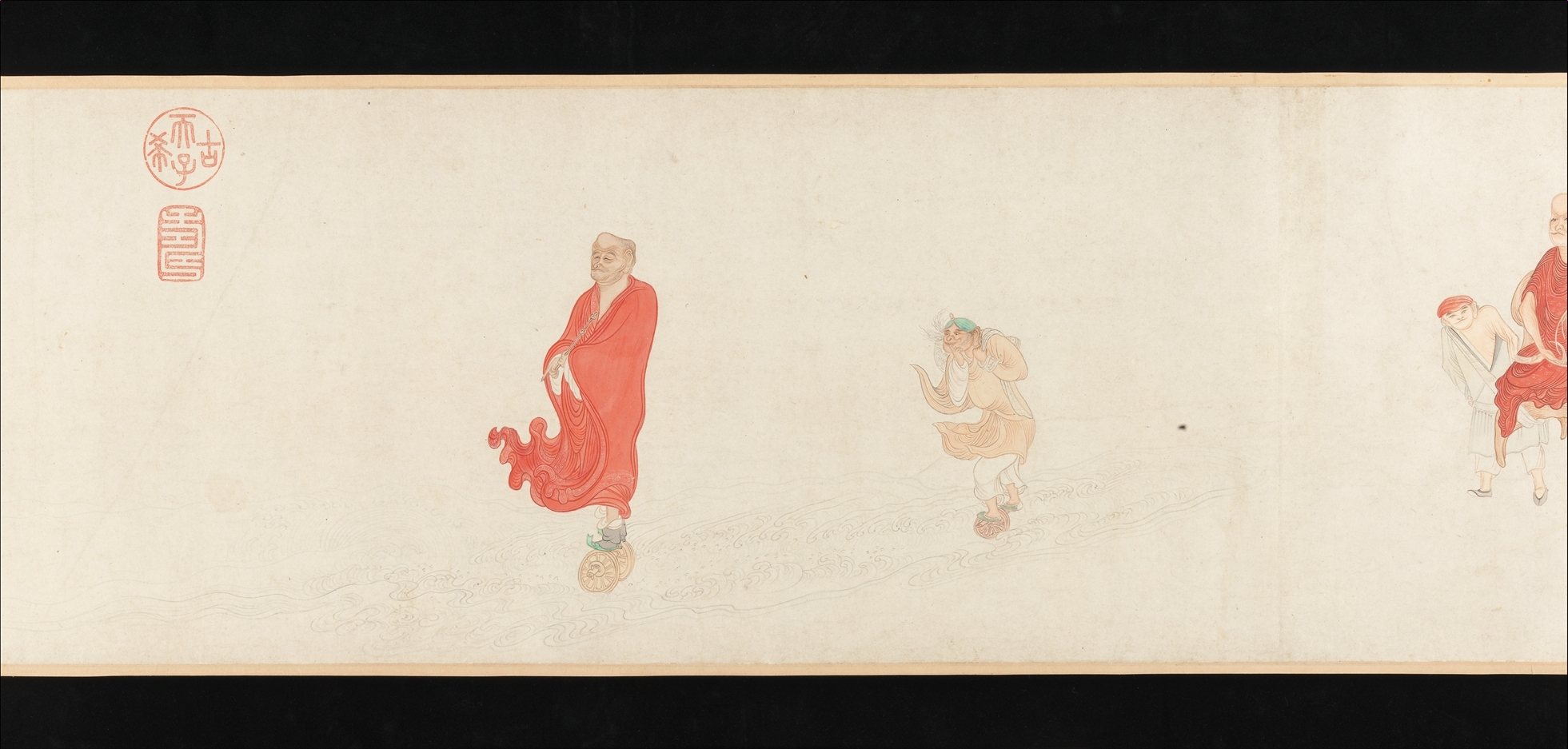

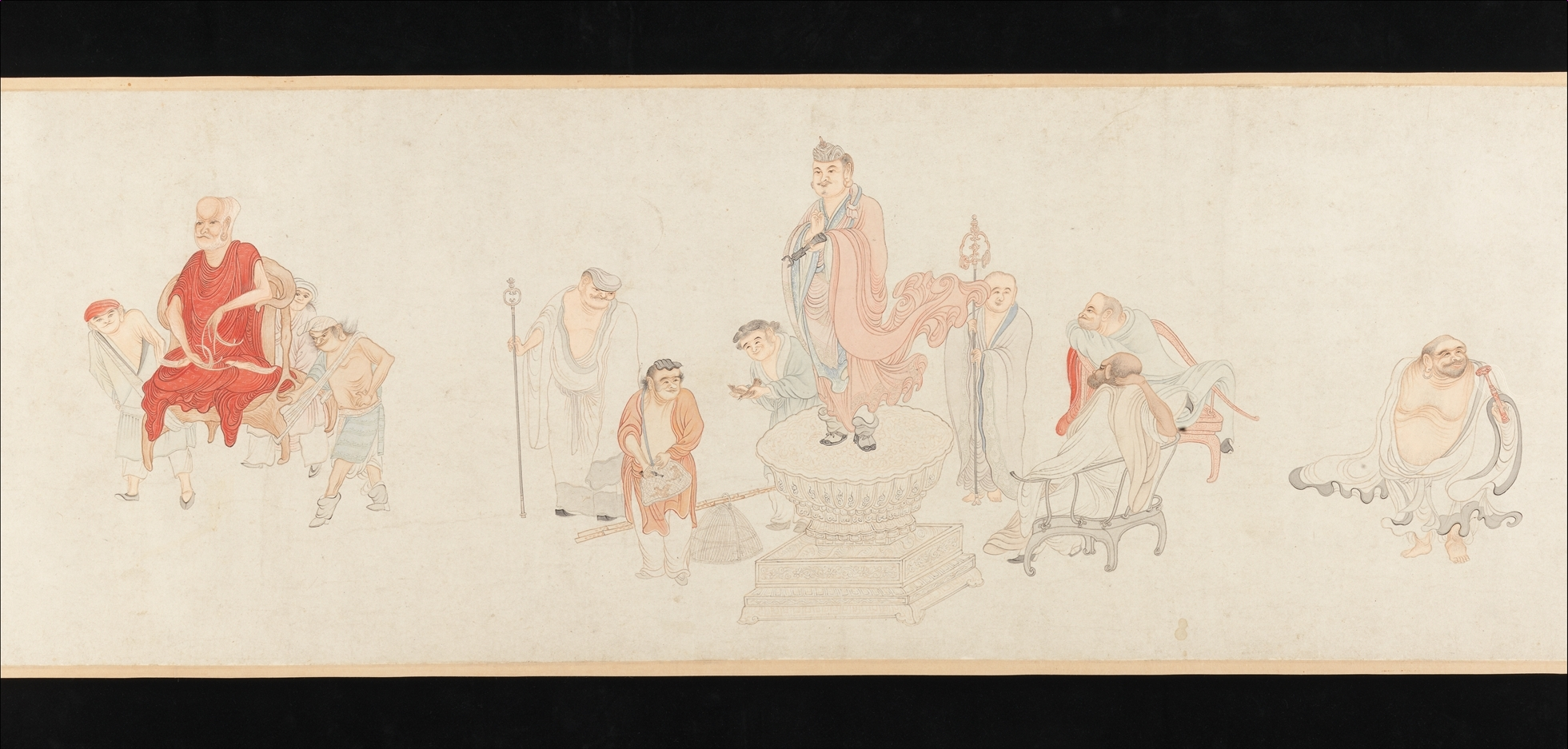

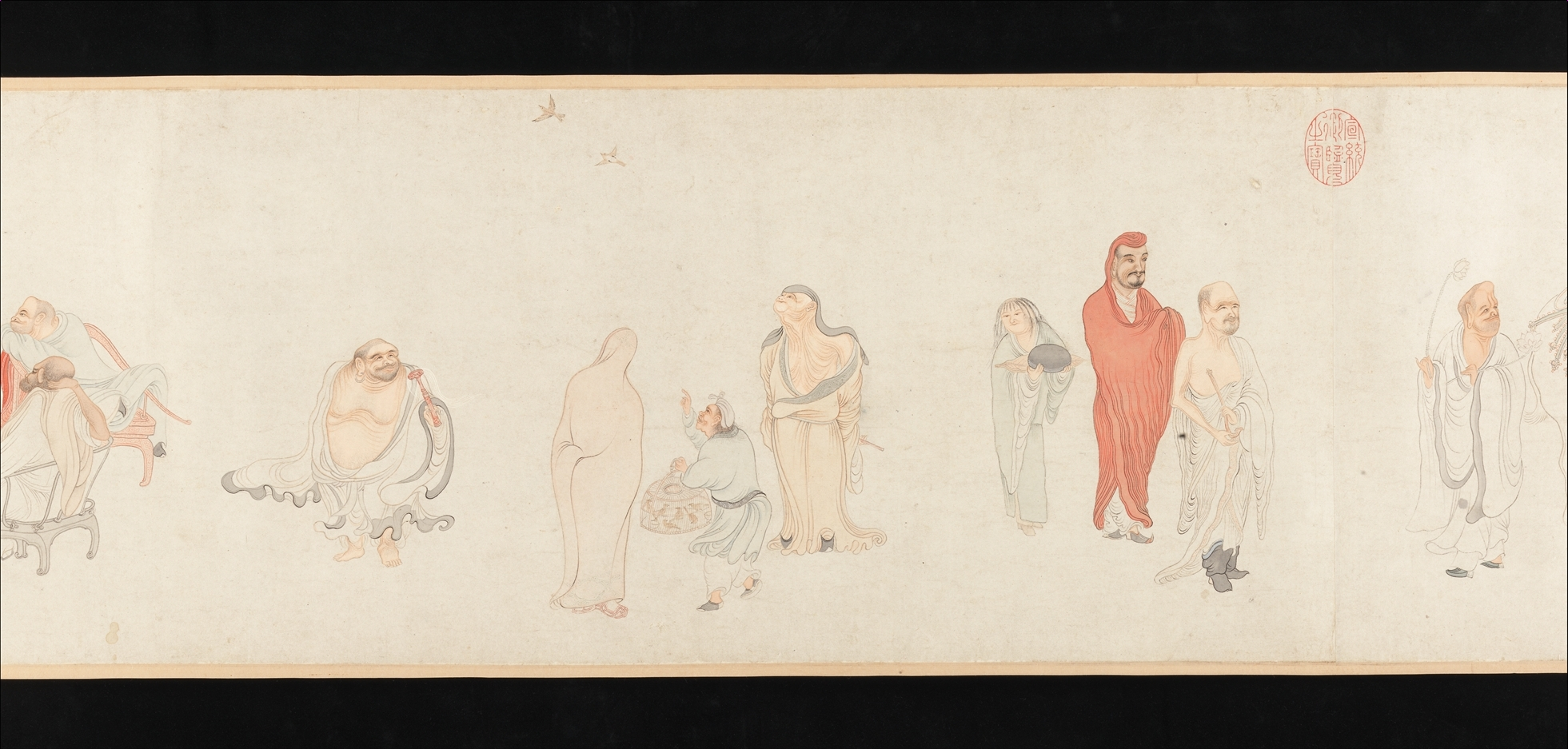

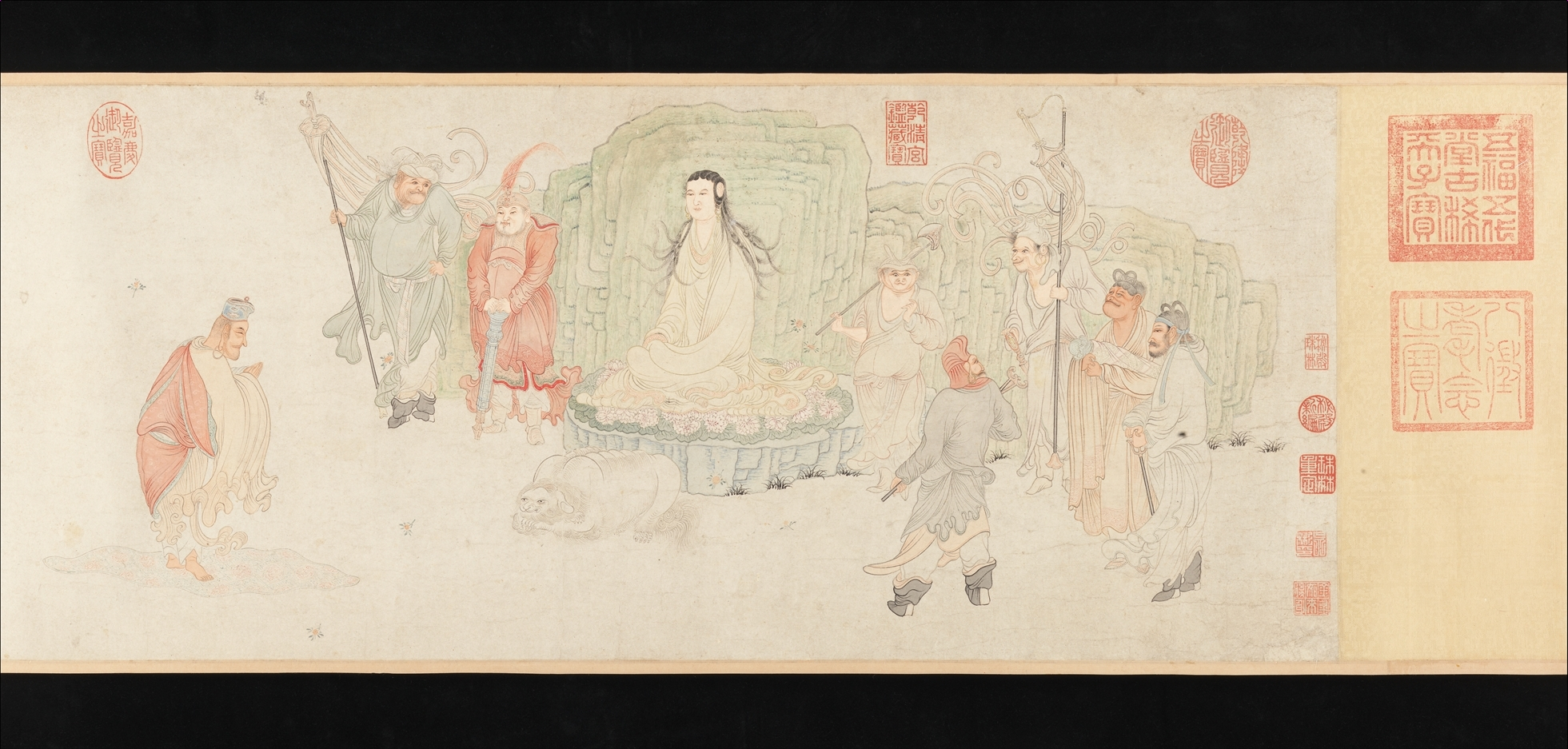
Ming dynasty painting scroll of the Sixteen Arhats by Qiu Ying. China. Currently held in the Metropolitan Museum of Art

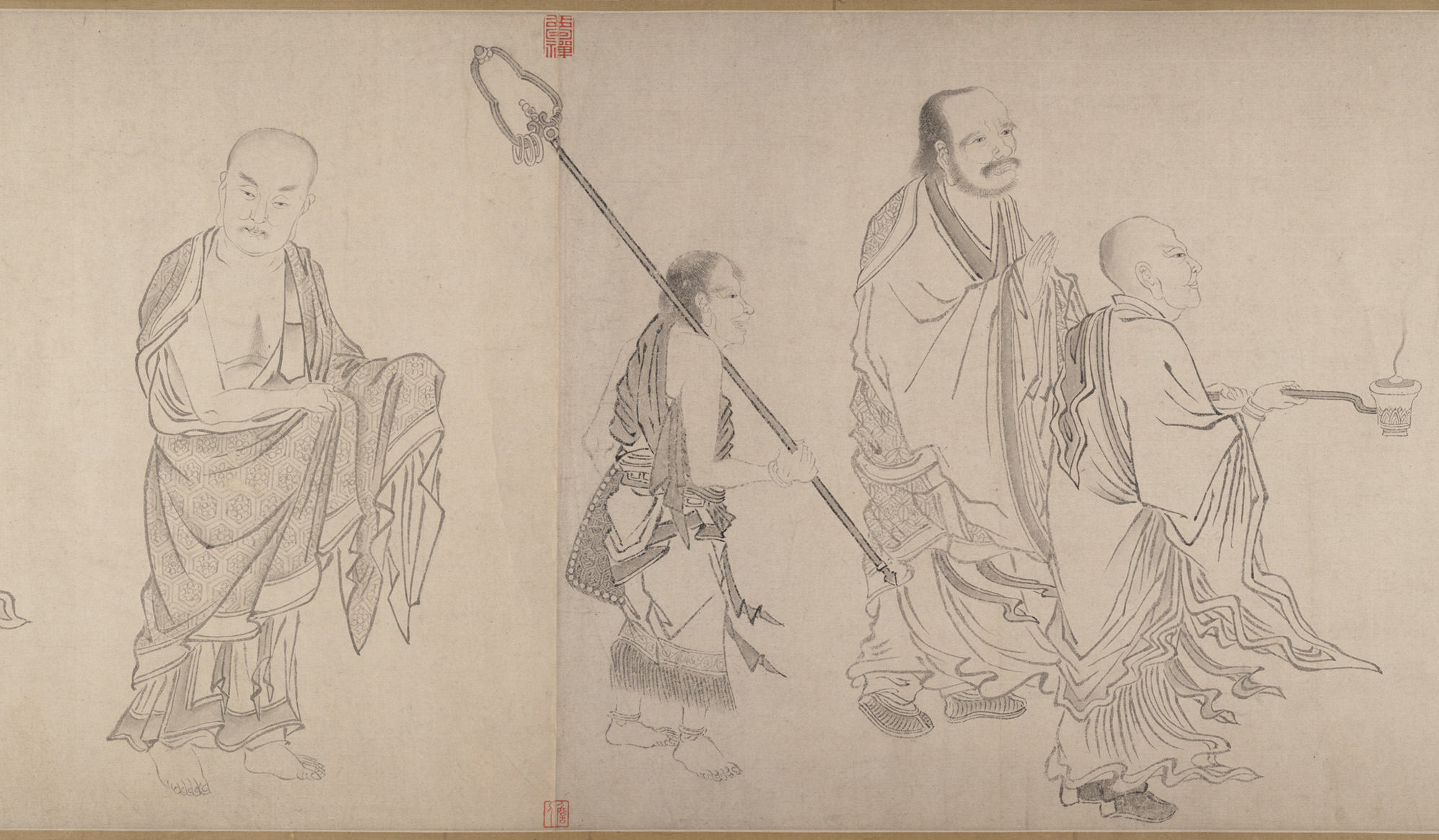

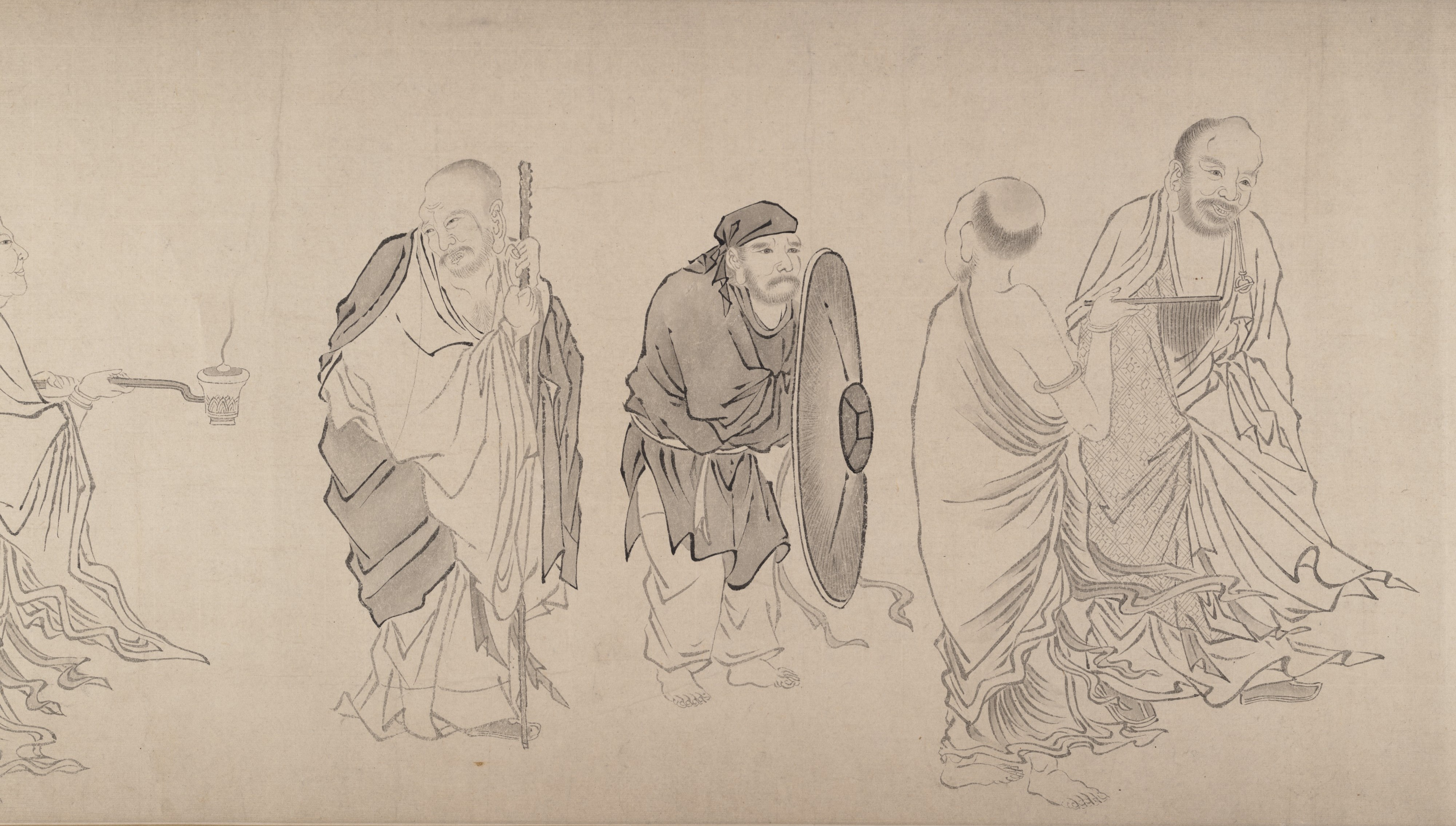

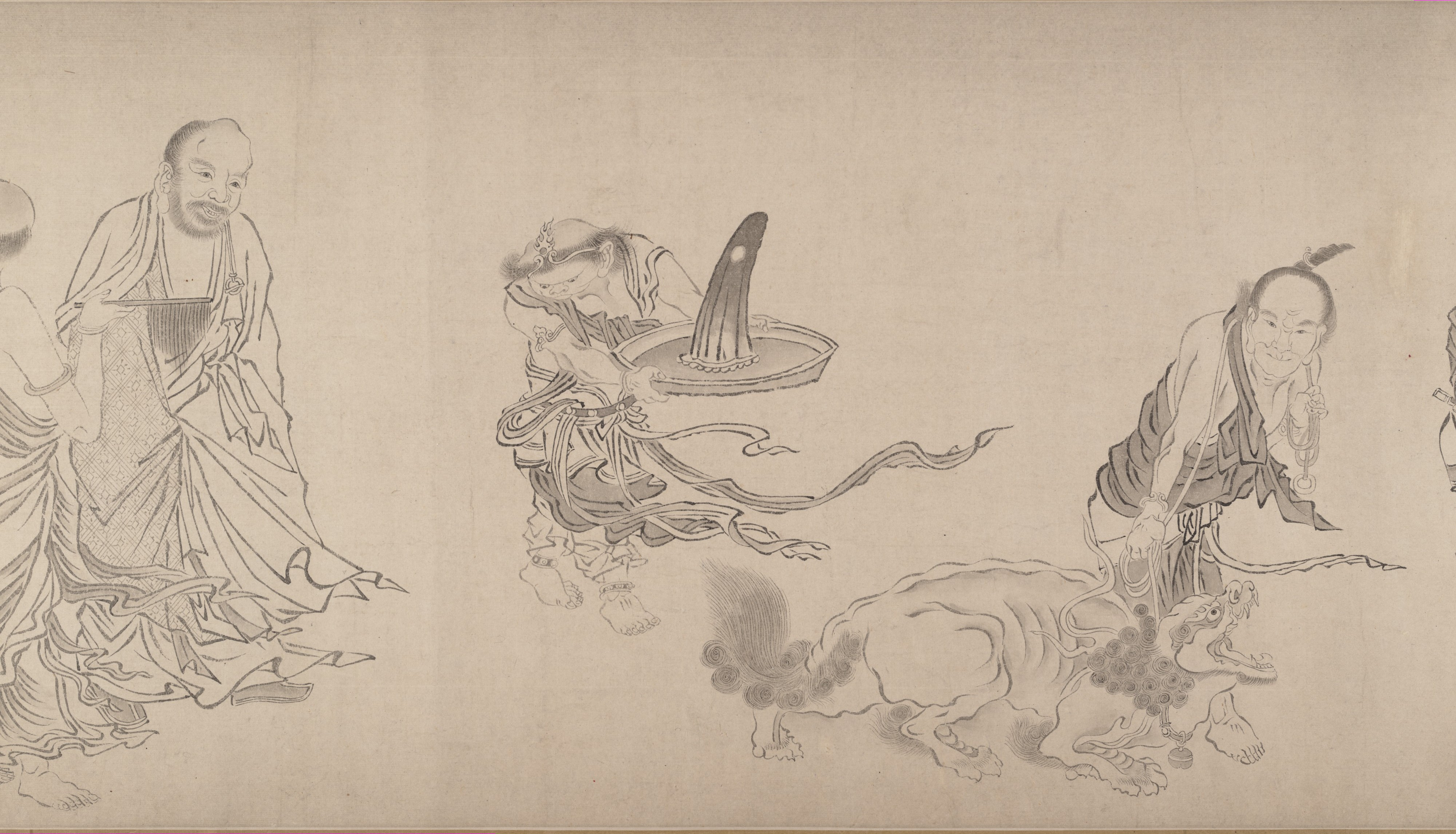

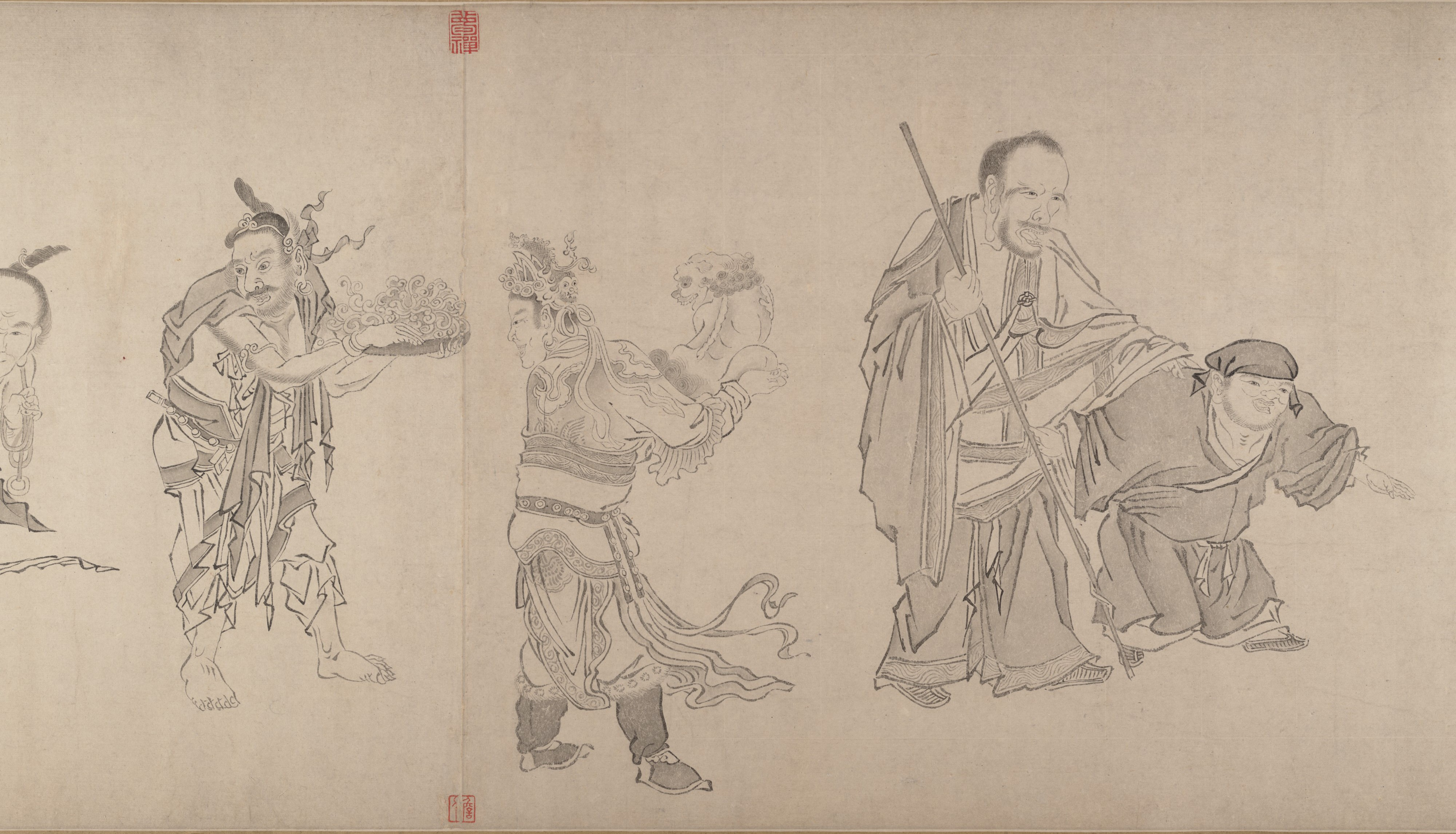

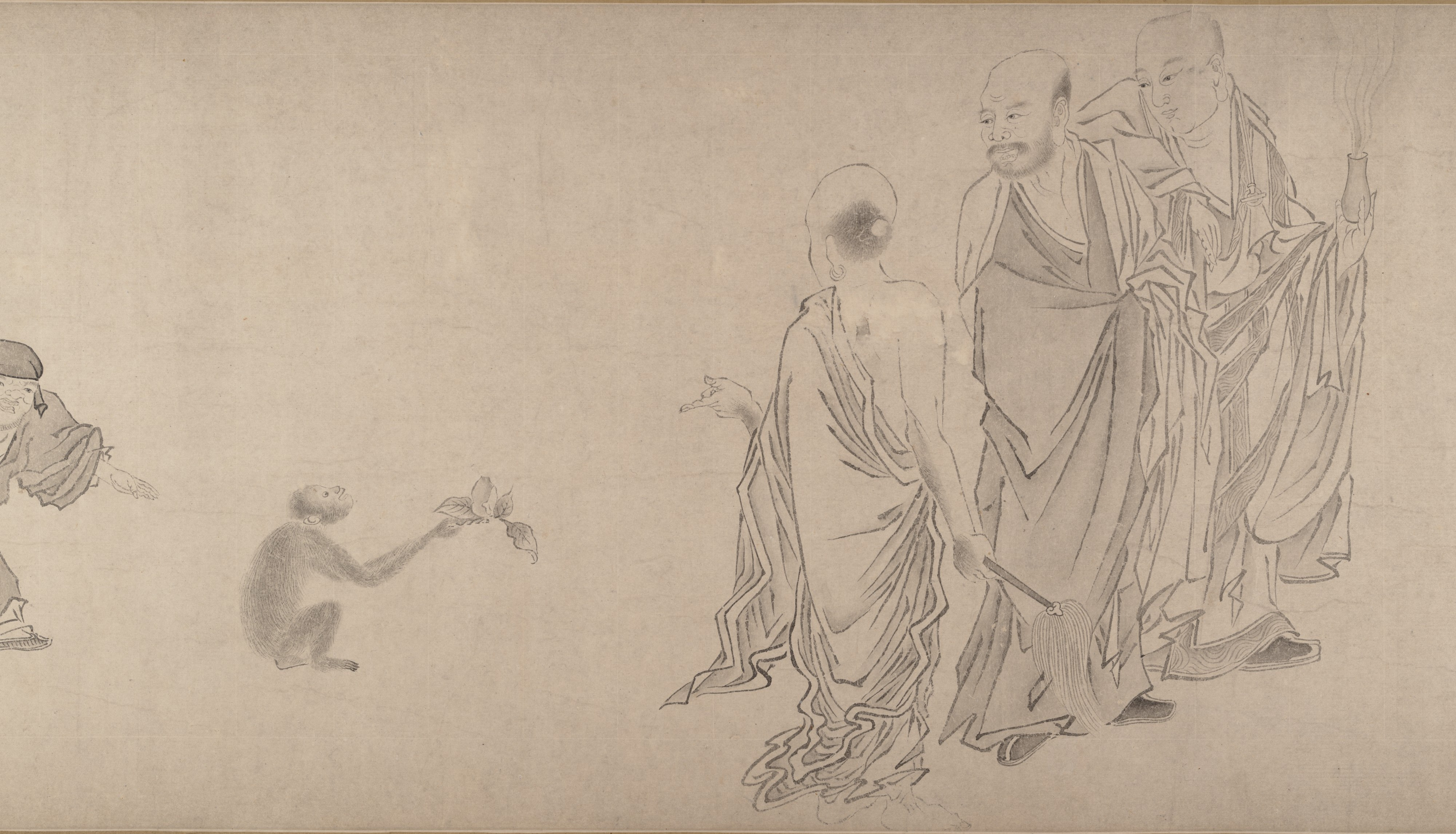

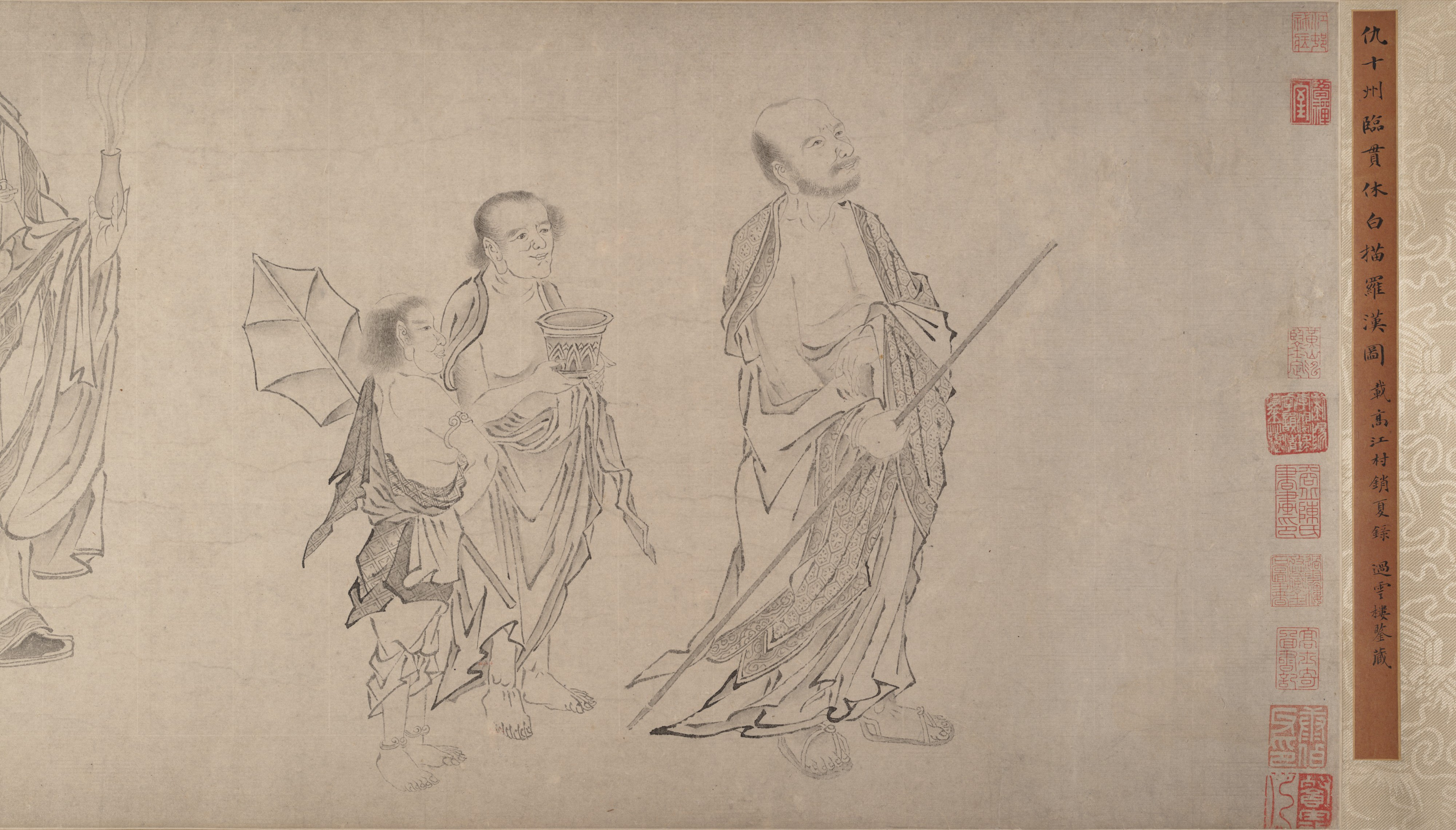
Qing dynasty painting scroll of the Sixteen Arhats by Shitao. China. Currently held in the Metropolitan Museum of Art

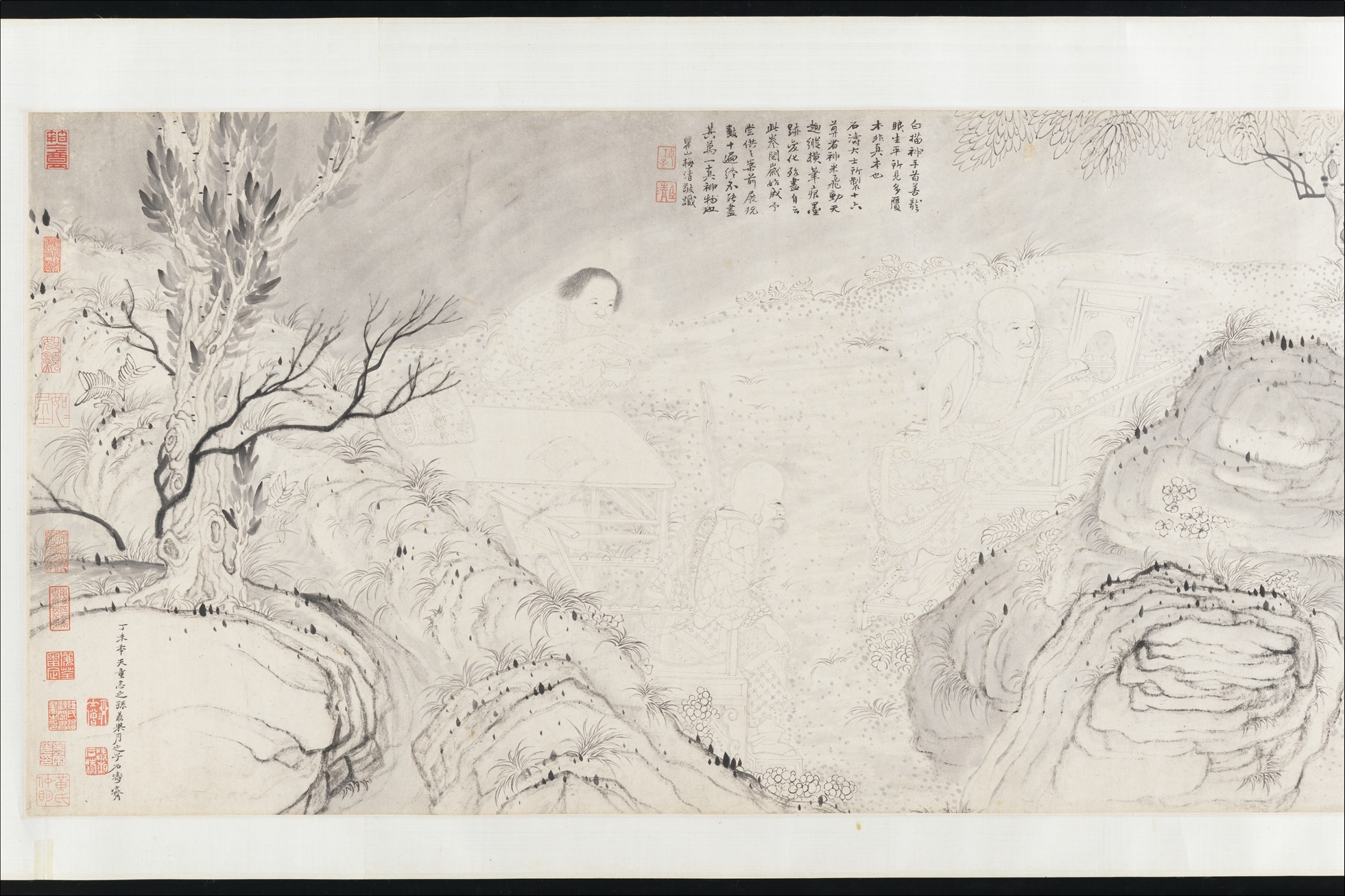

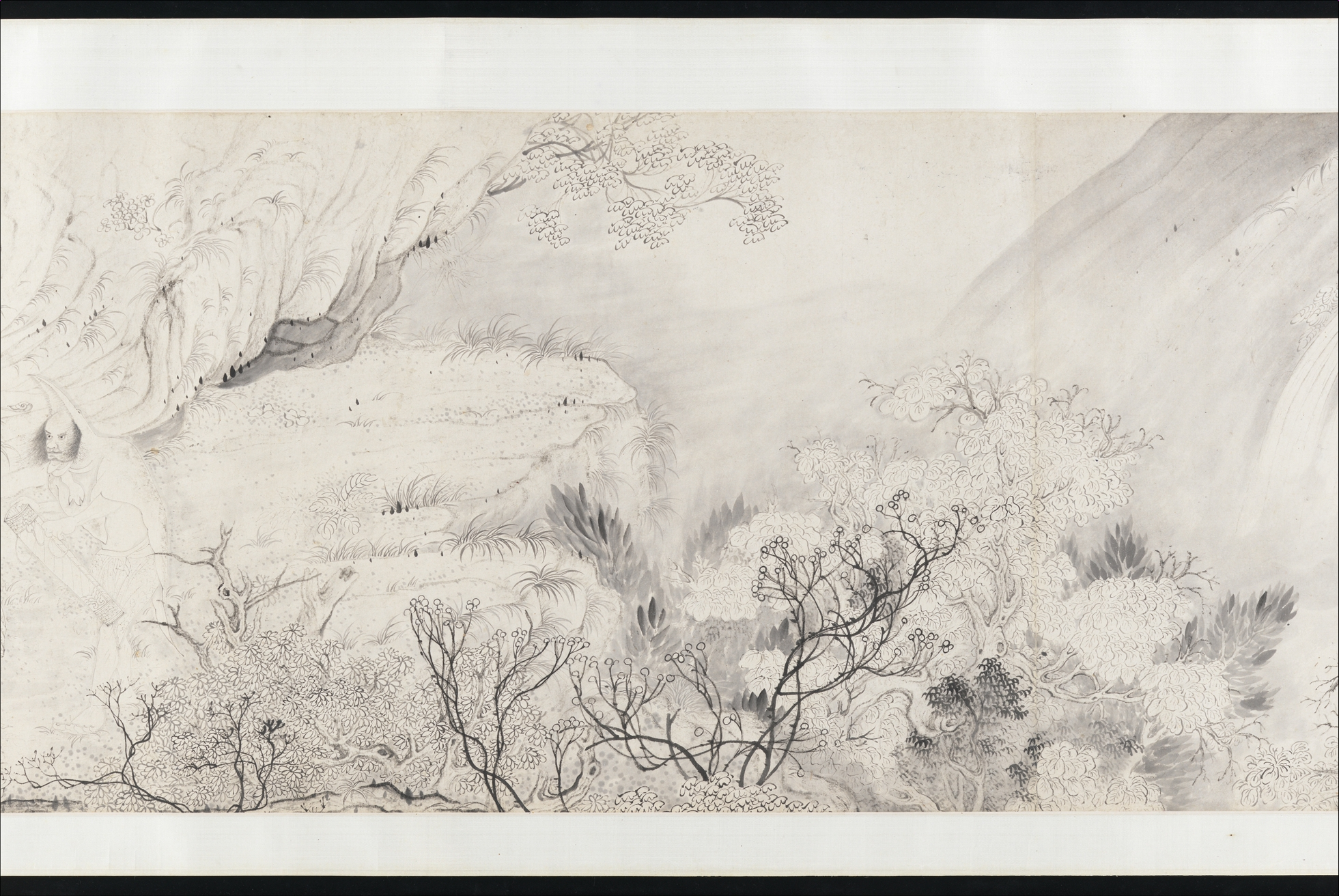

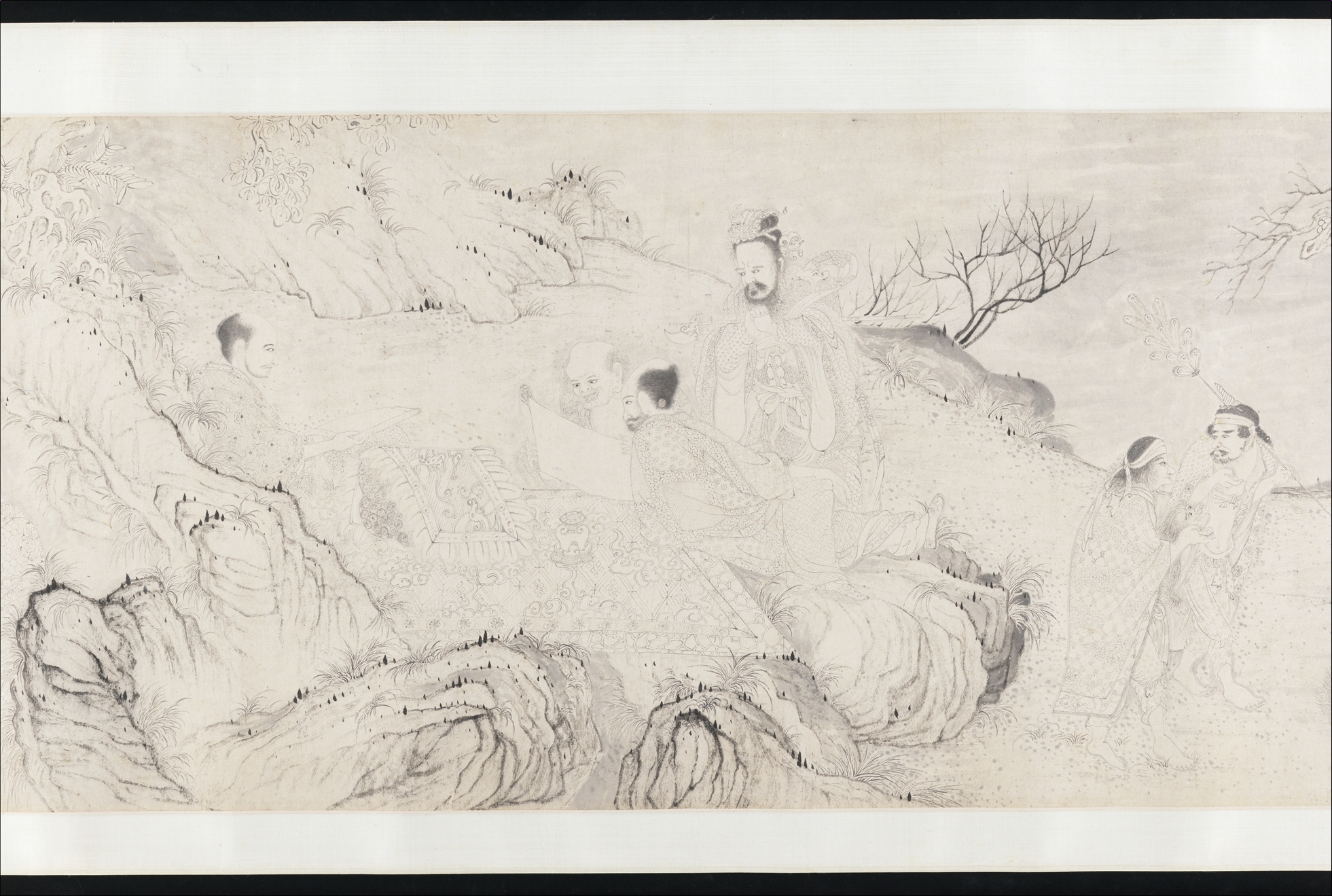

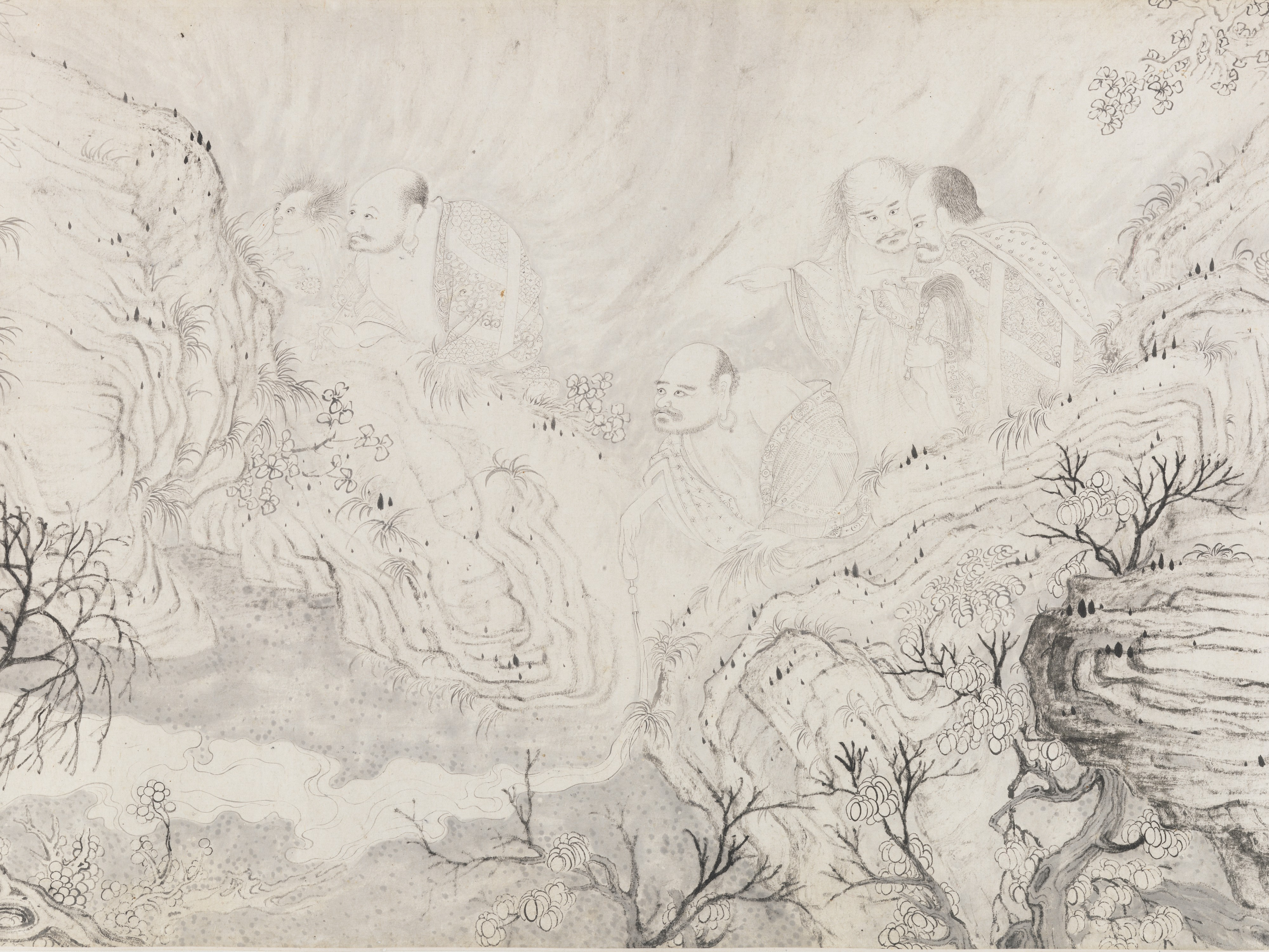

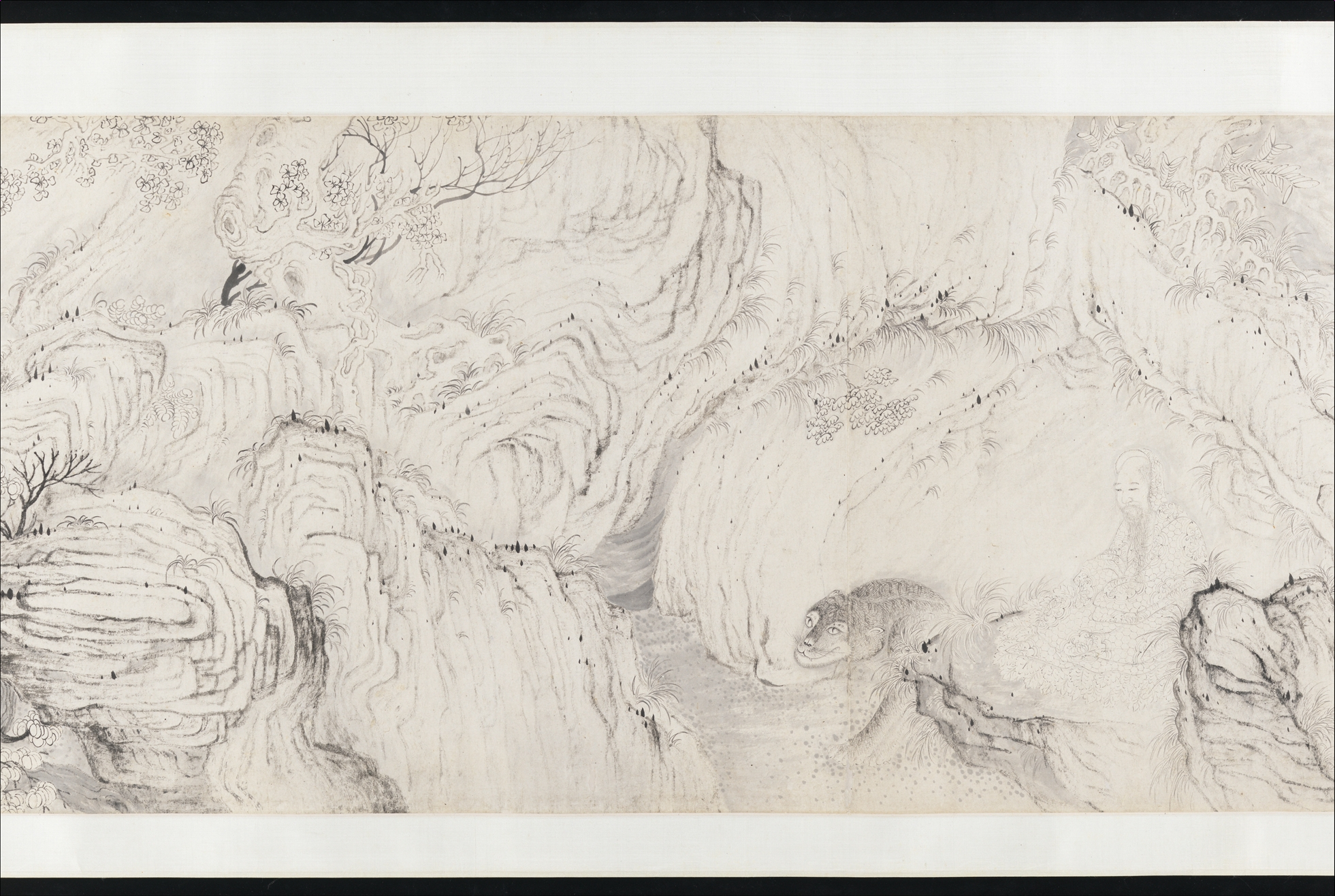

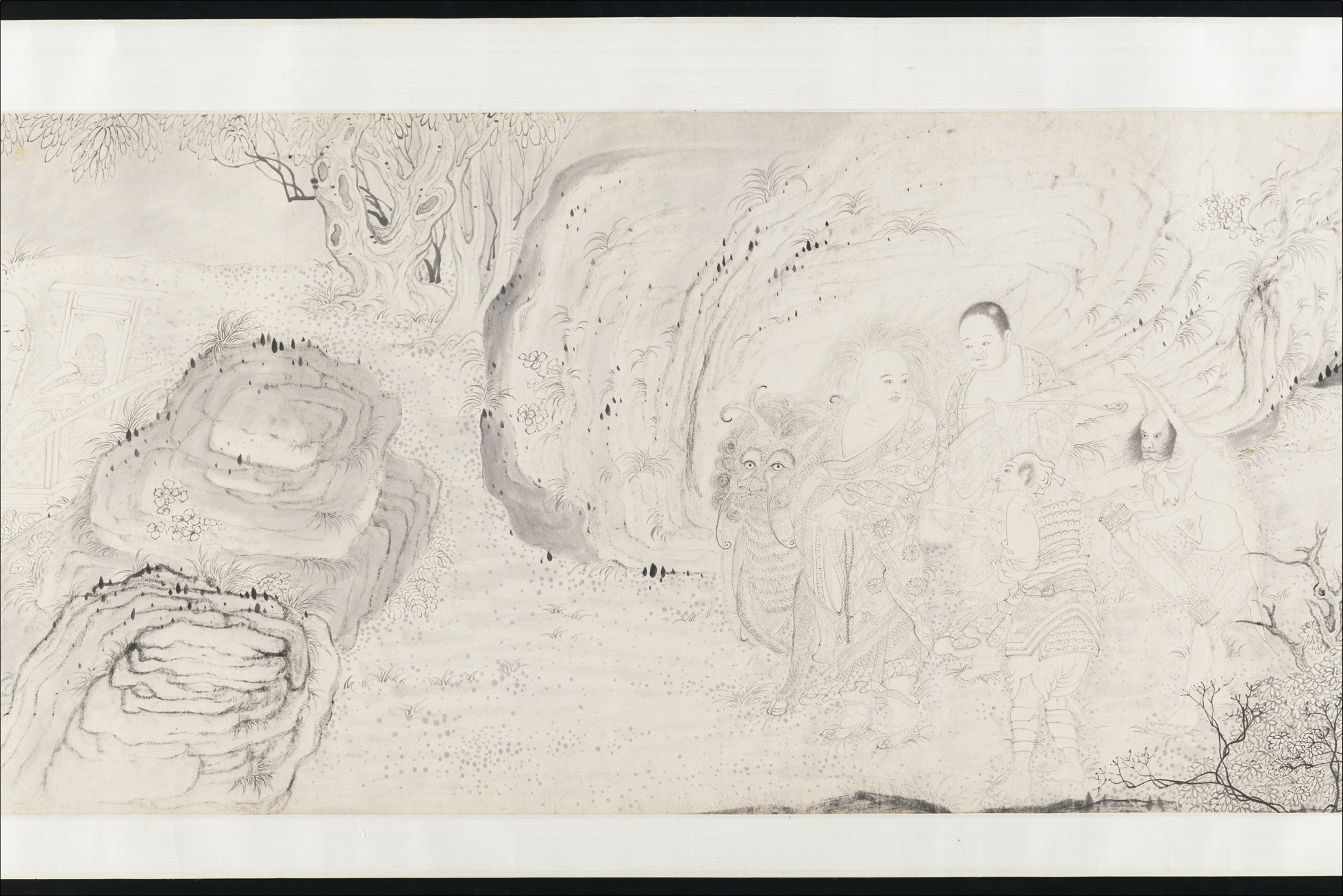

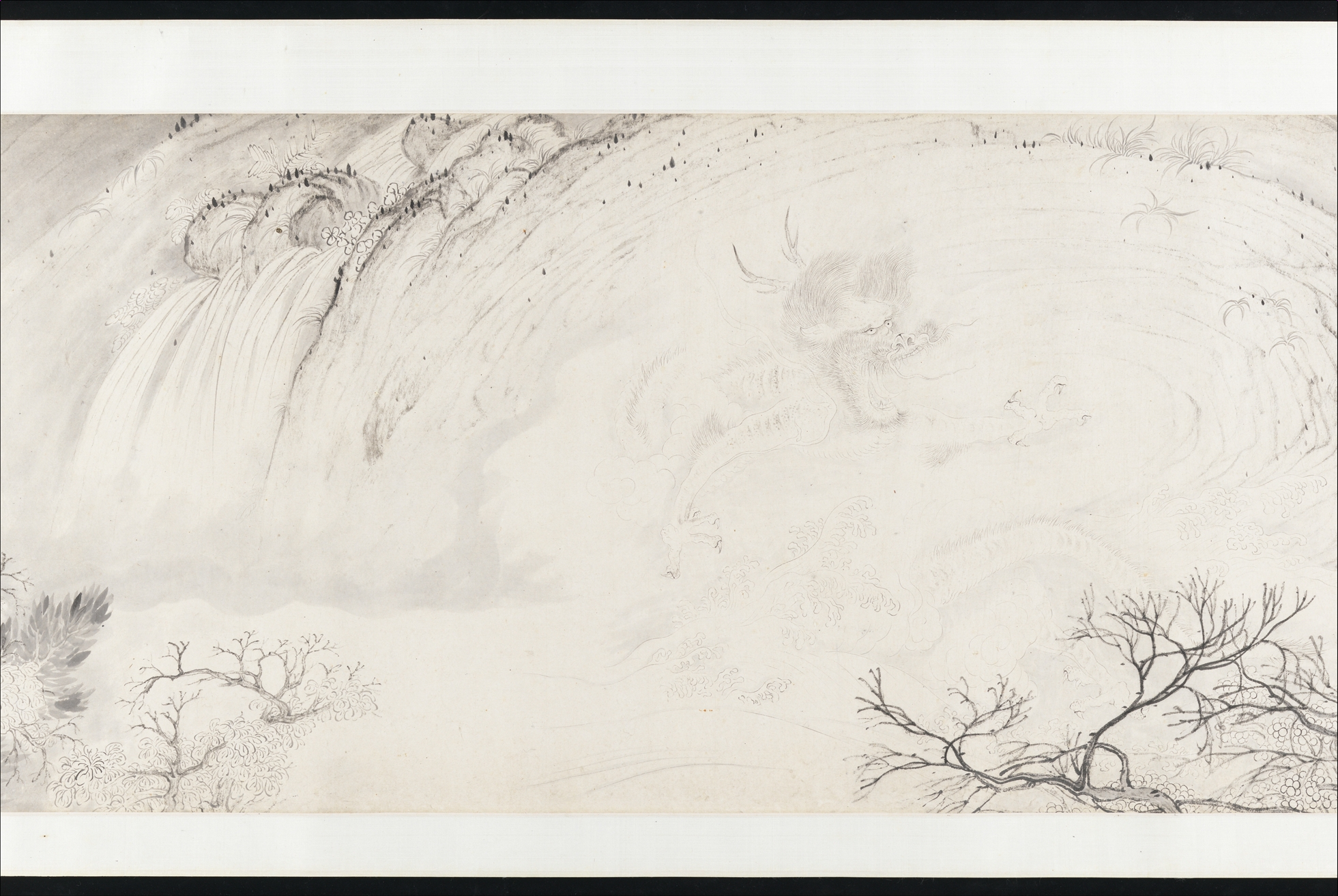

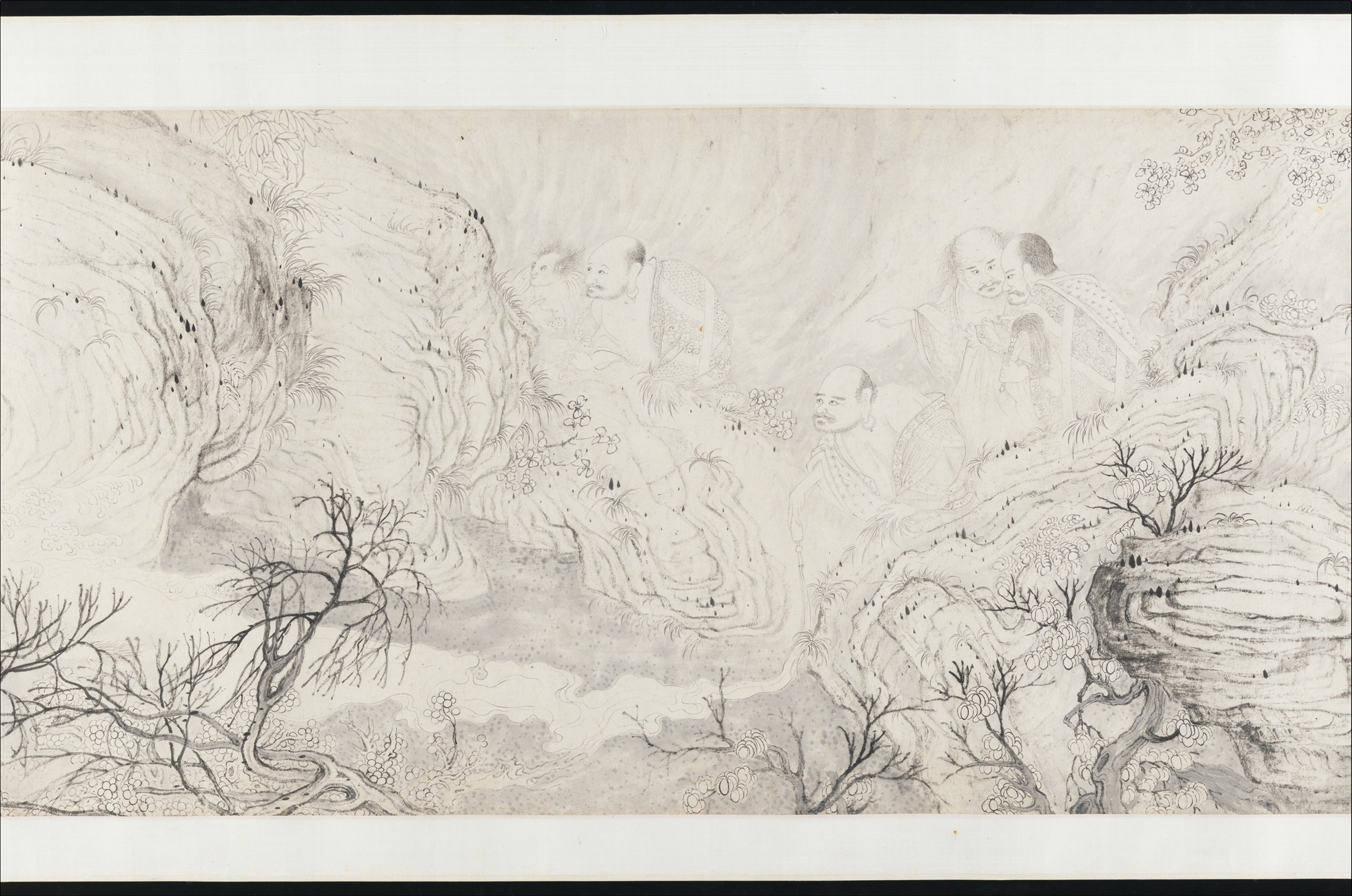

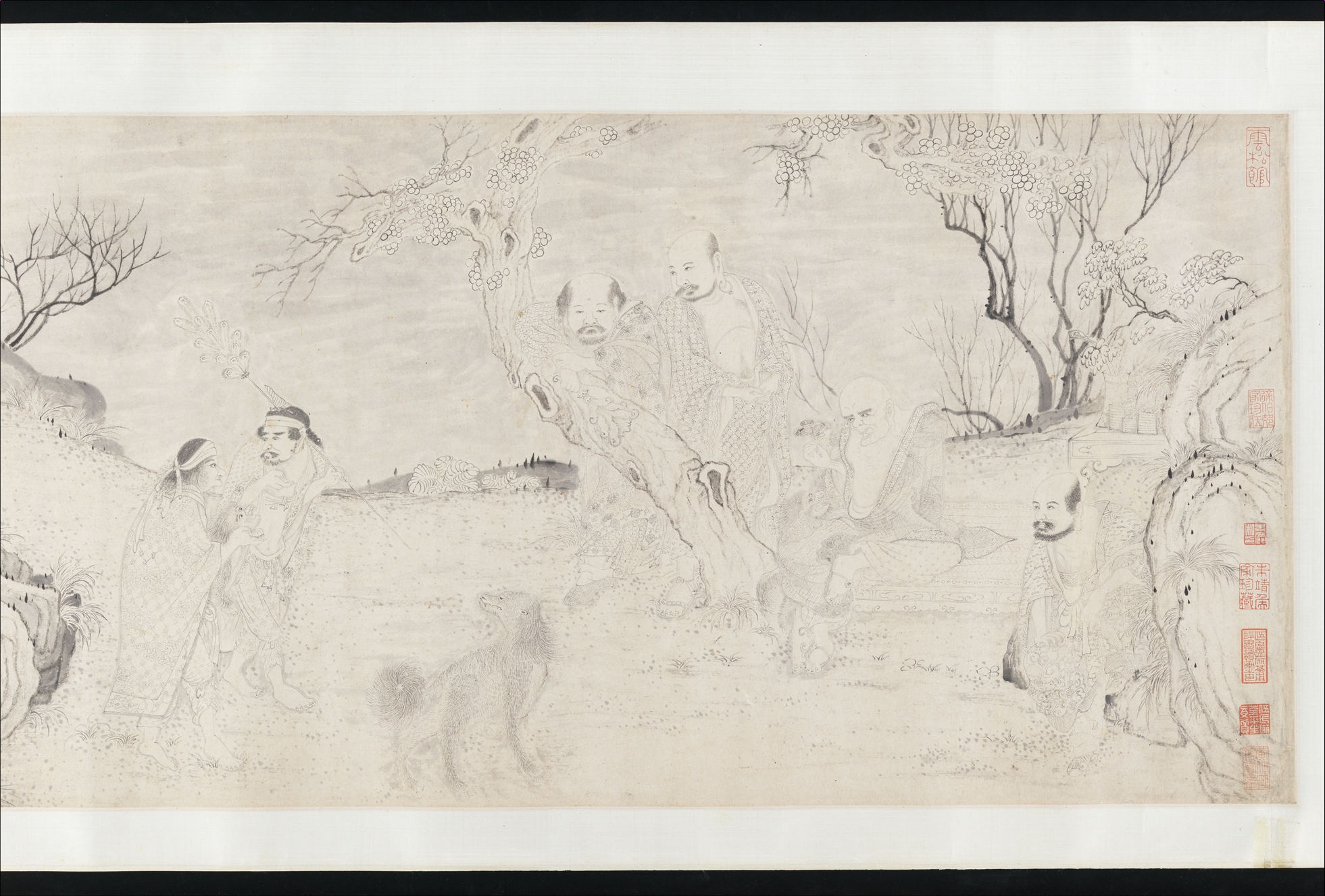
The Sixteen Arhats from the Alice S. Kandell Collection

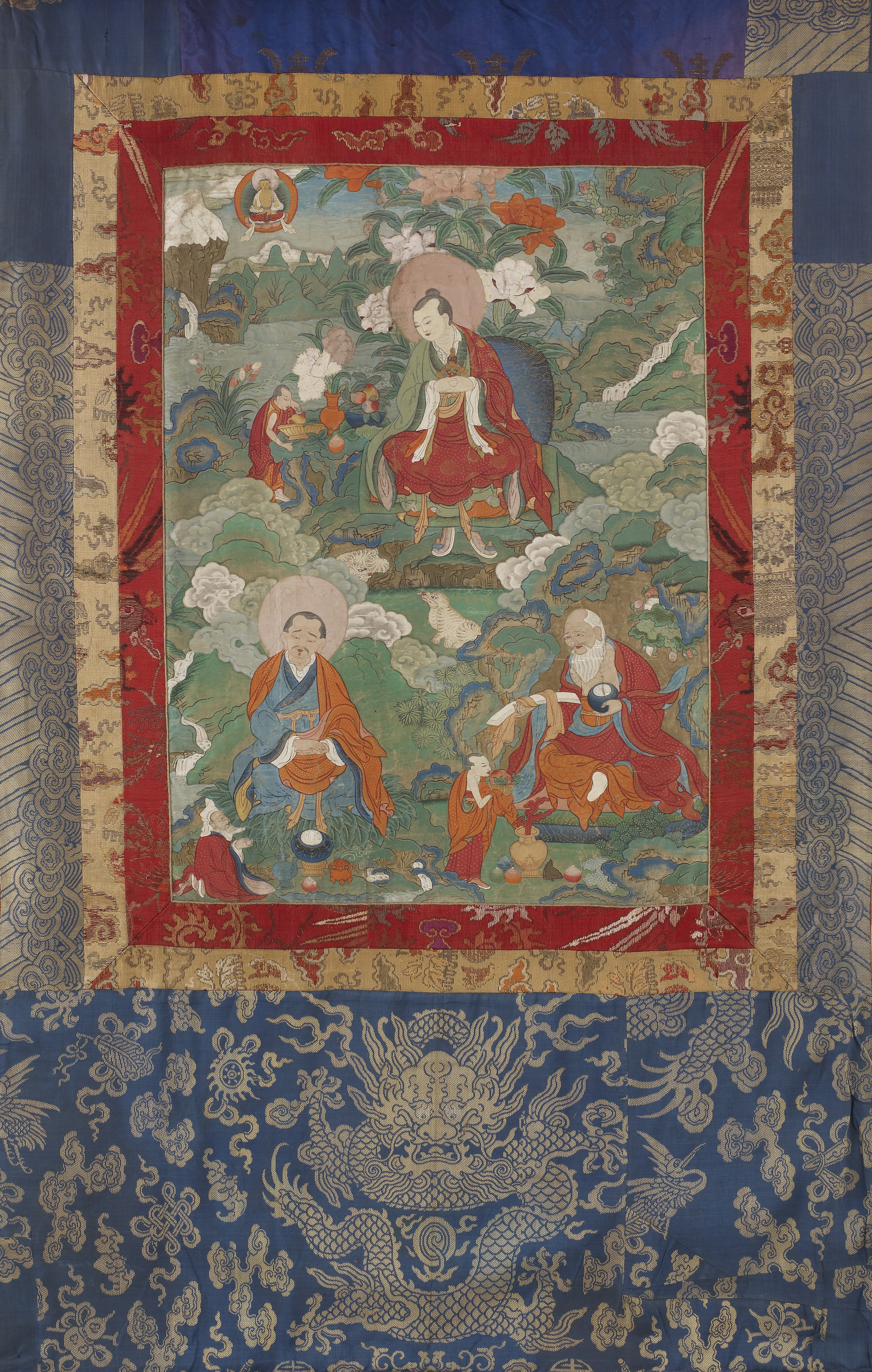
Arhats Rahula, Cudapanthaka, and Pindola

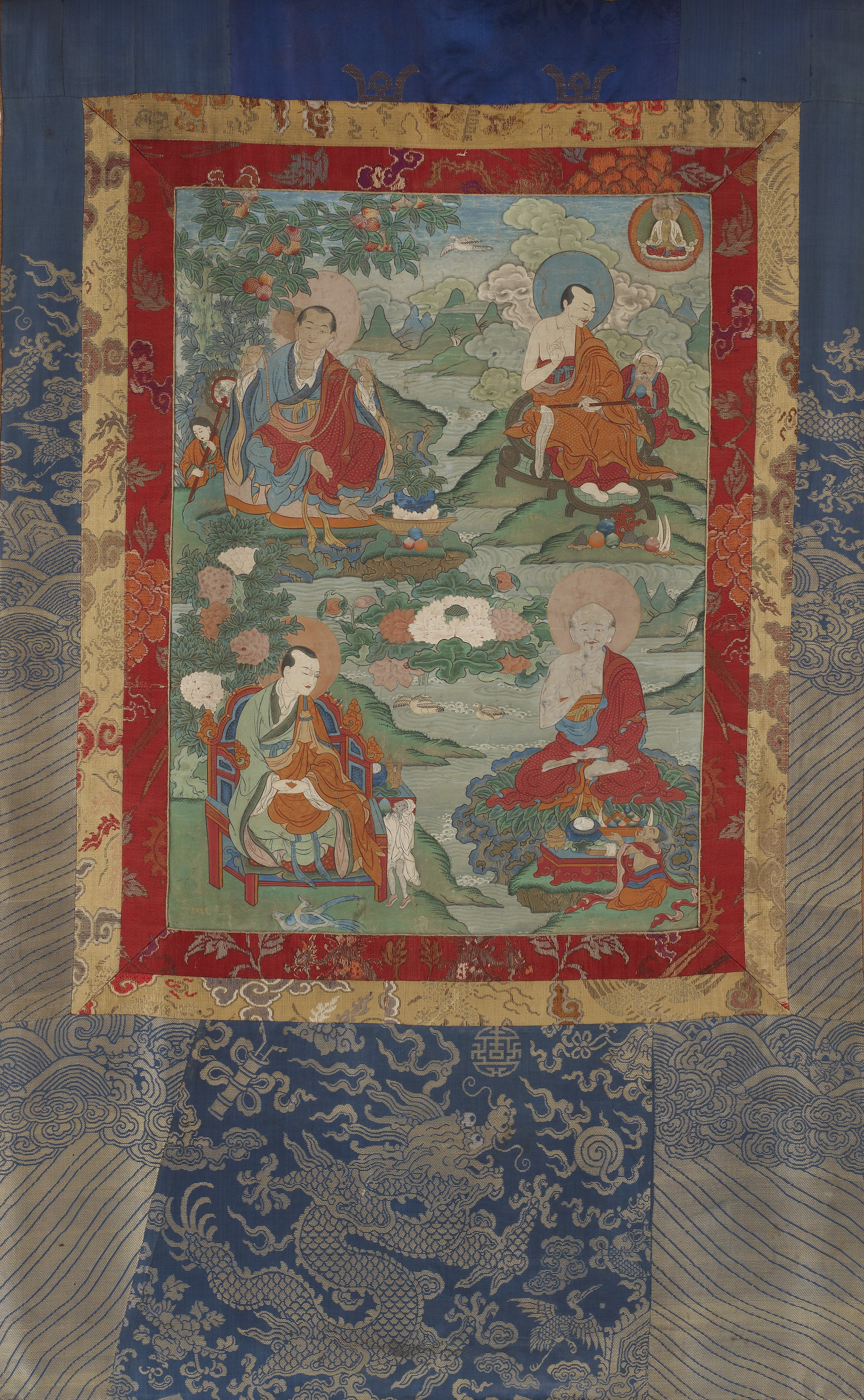
Arhats Kanakavasta, Vajriputra, Kanaka-Bharadvaja, and Bhadra

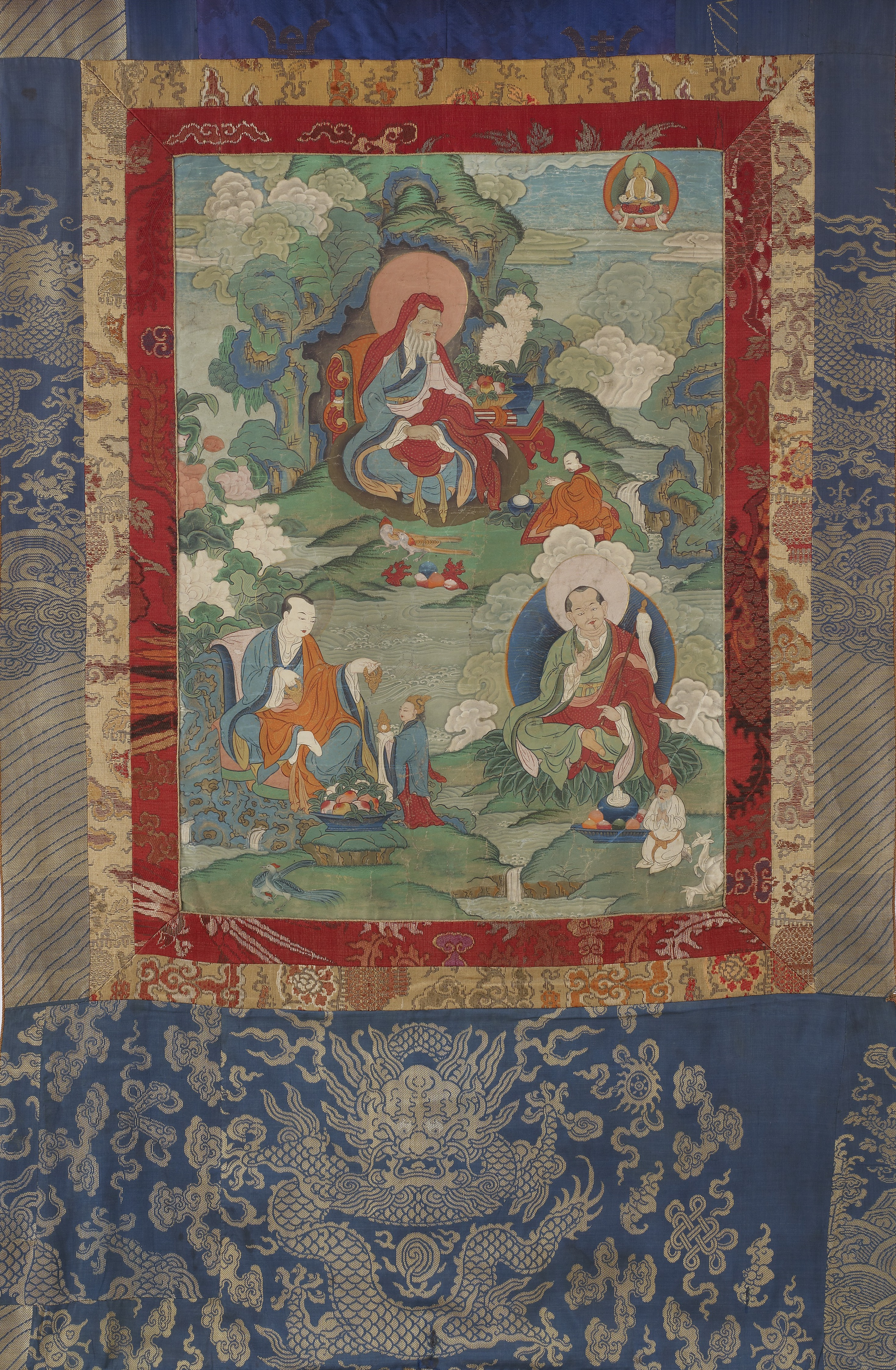
Arhats Ajita, Kalika, and Vanavasin

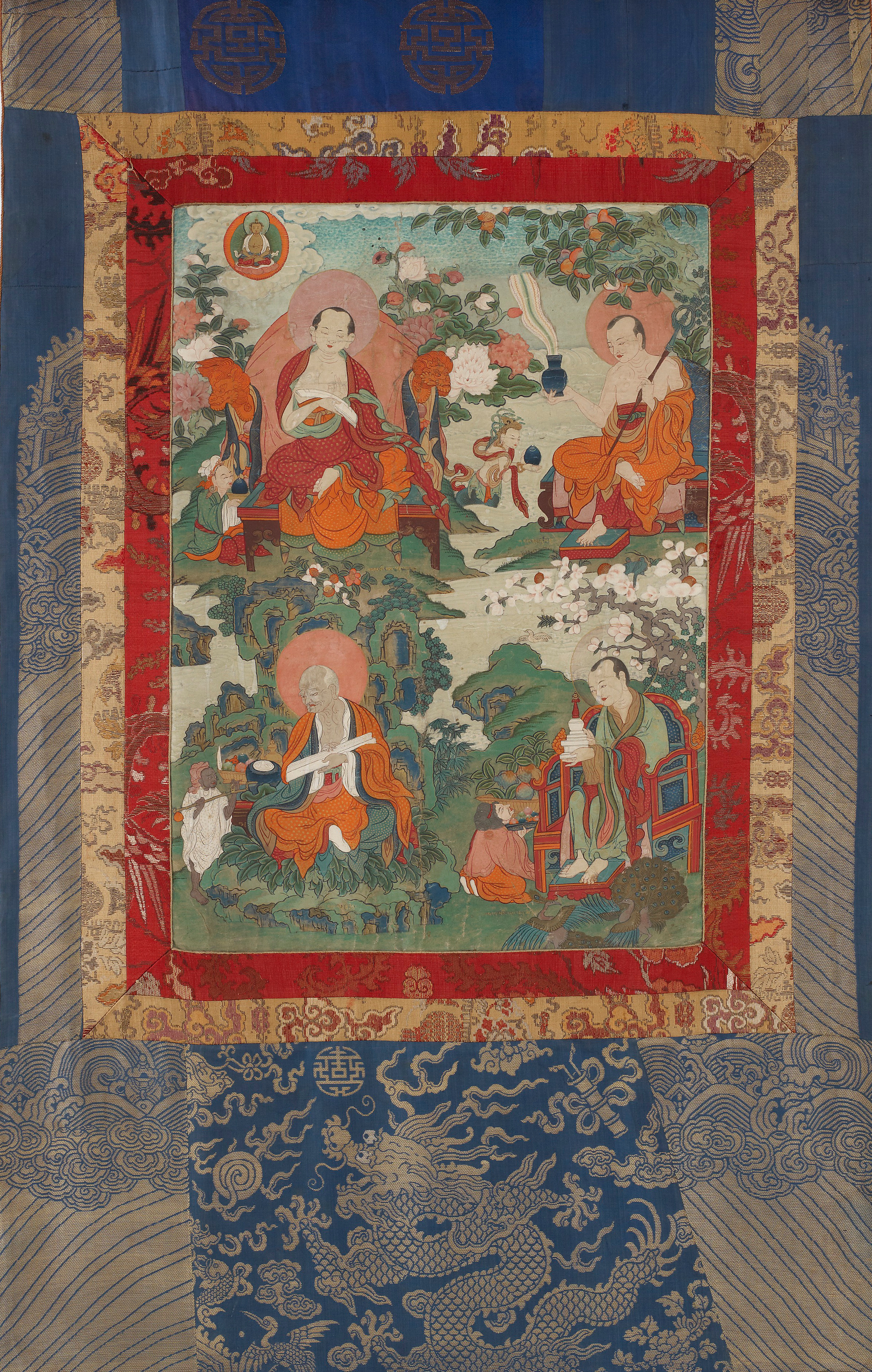
Arhats Panthaka, Nagasena, Gopaka, and Abheda
Other depictions of the Sixteen Arhats in Art

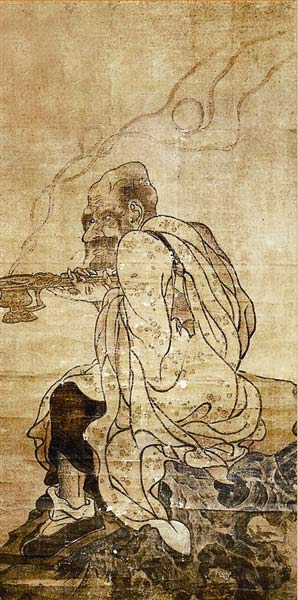
Painting of Ańgaja (Yīnjiētuó zūnzhě), out of a set depicting the sixteen arhats, by Guanxiu.9th - 10th century. China.

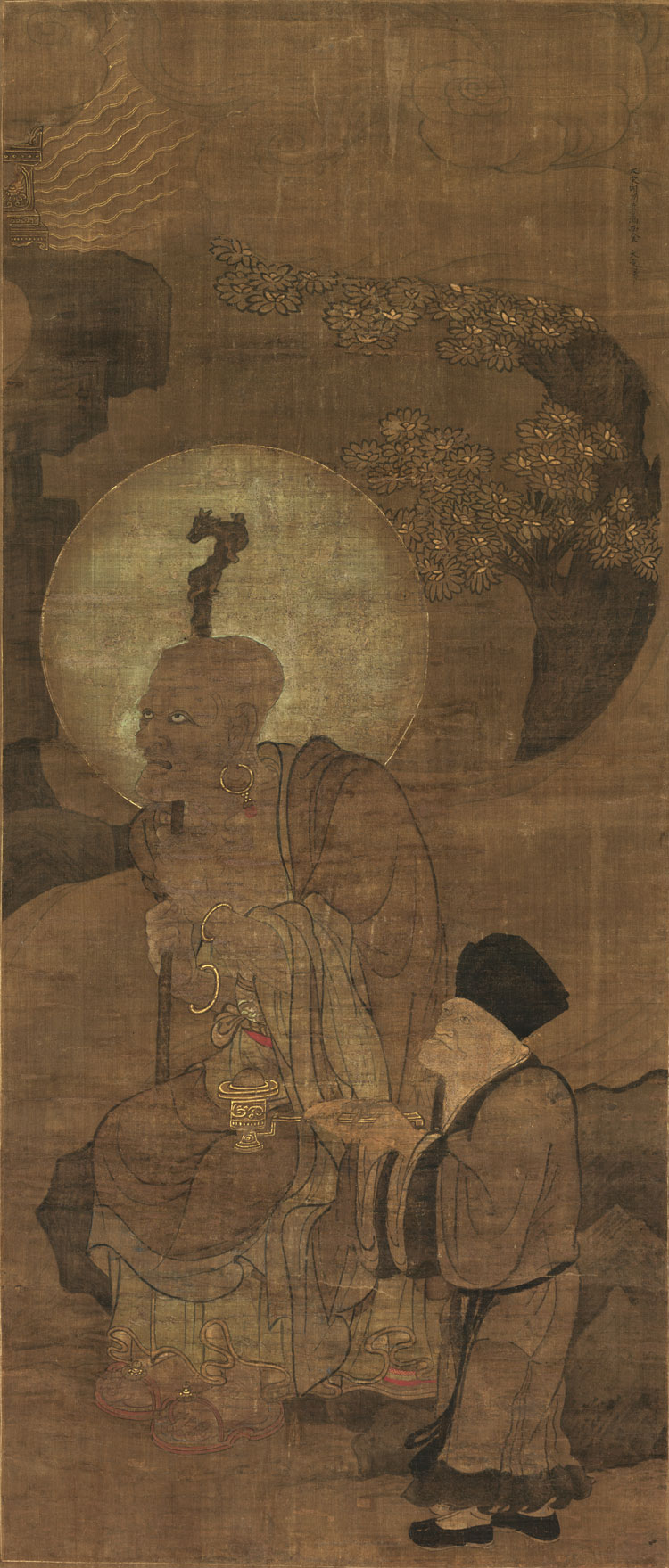
Song dynasty painting of Ańgaja (Yīnjiētuó zūnzhě), out of a set depicting the sixteen arhats. China. Currently held in the Tokyo National Museum.

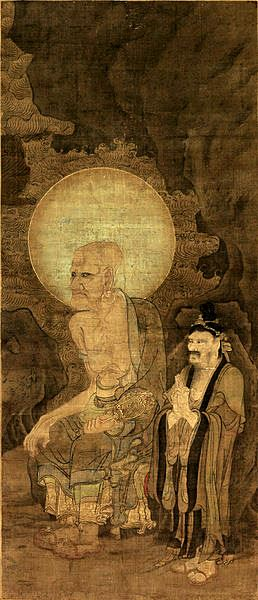
Song dynasty painting of Gopaka/Jīvaka (Róngbójiā zūnzhě), out of a set depicting the sixteen arhats. China. Currently held in the Tokyo National Museum.

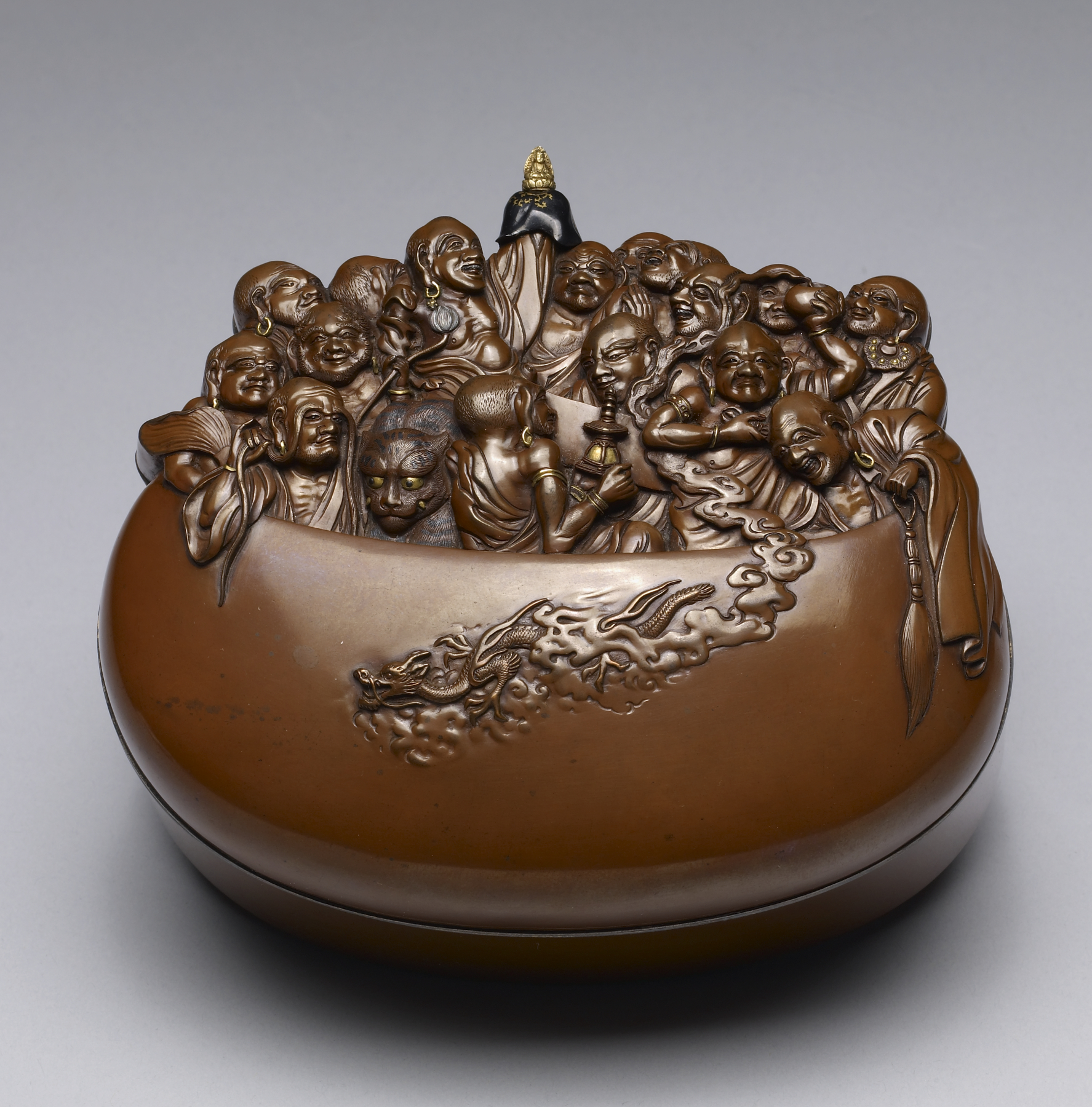
Covered Box in the Shape of Sixteen Arhats in a Begging Bowl

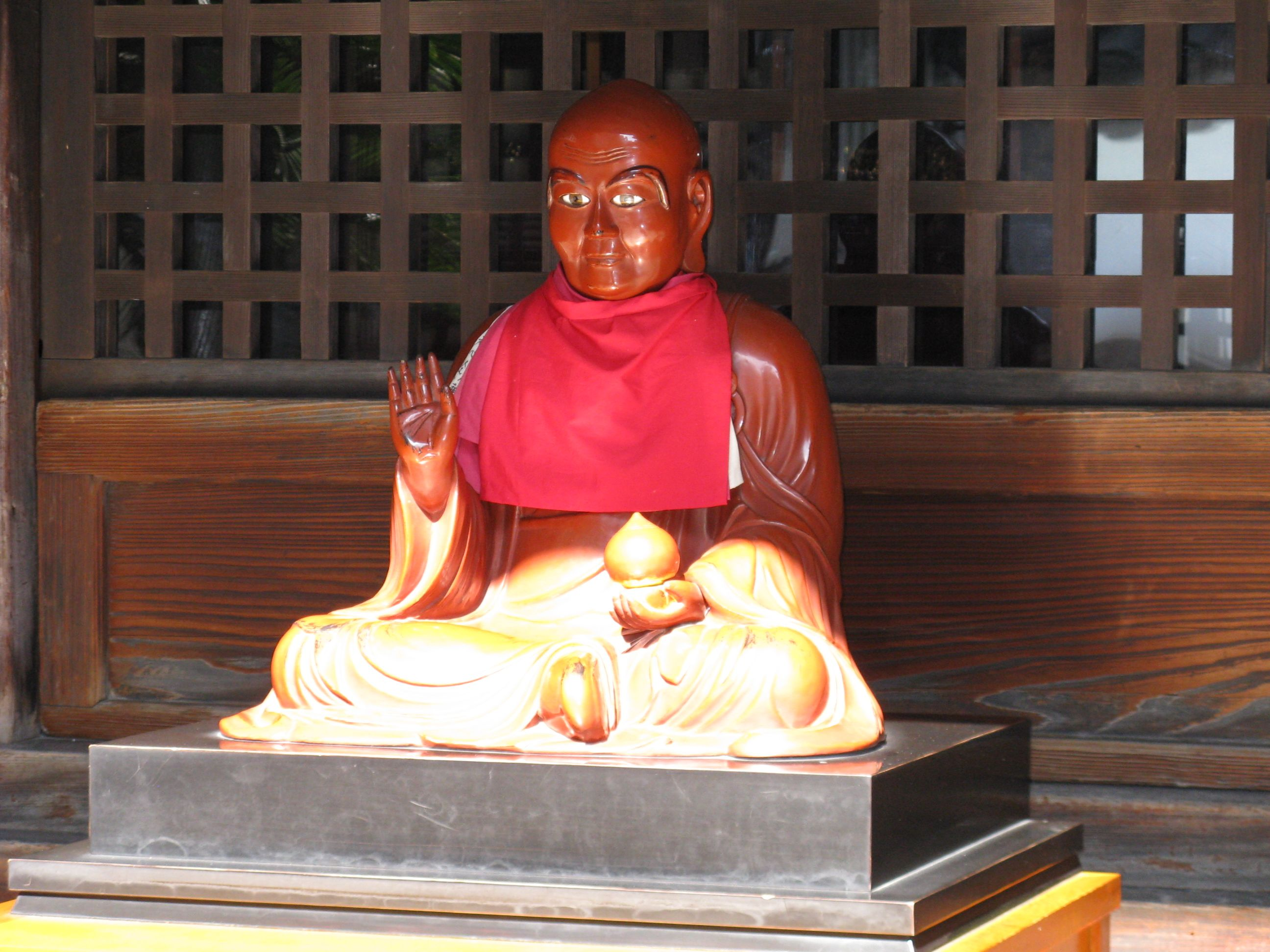
Pindolabharadrāja (Binzuru) statue in Mitsu-tera Temple, Osaka, Japan.

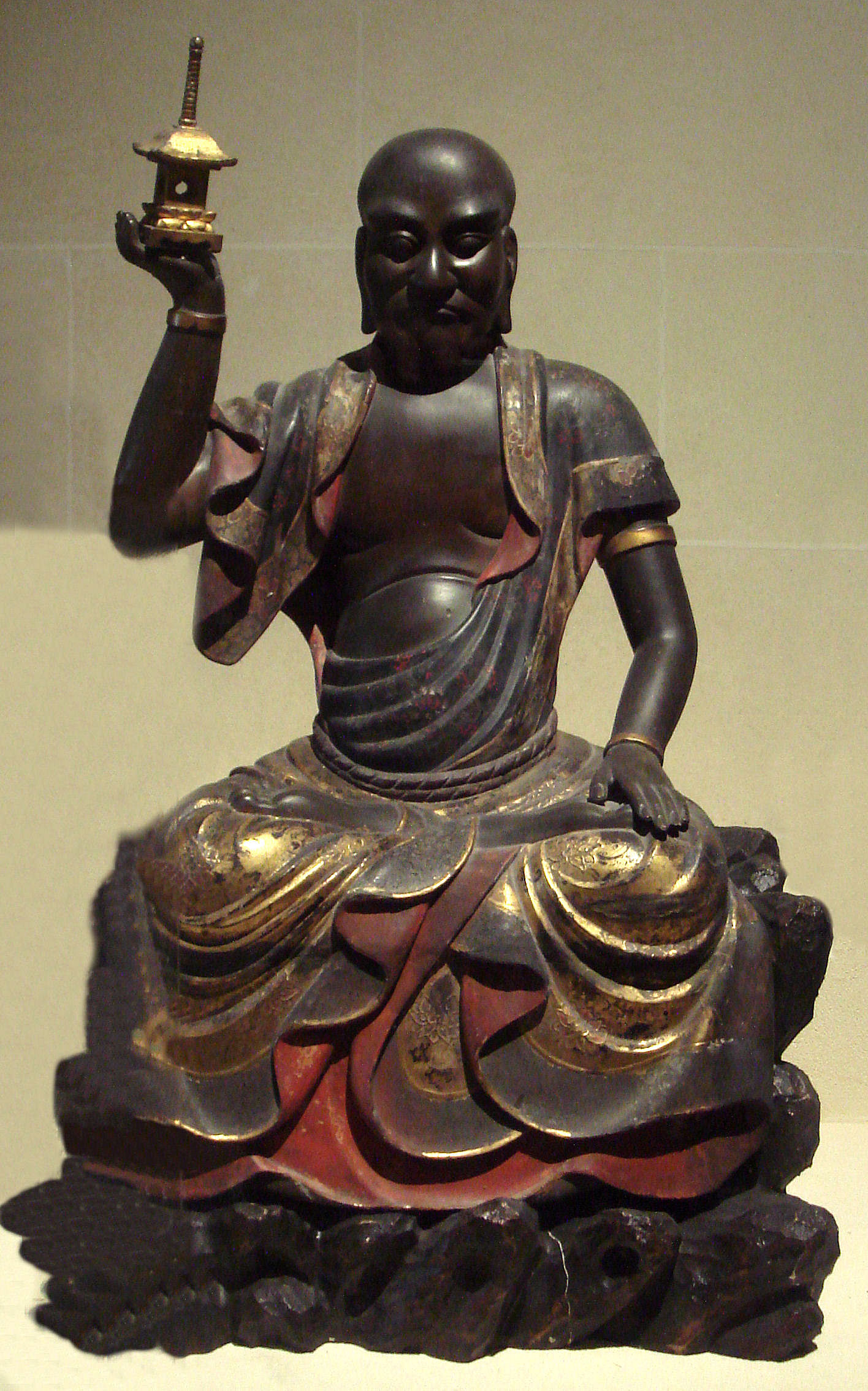
Ańgaja (Ingada sonja) holding a stupika in his right hand. Musée Guimet.

== See also ==
- Eighteen Arhats
