= Aṅgaja =

One of the Sixteen Arhats or Rakan of Buddhism

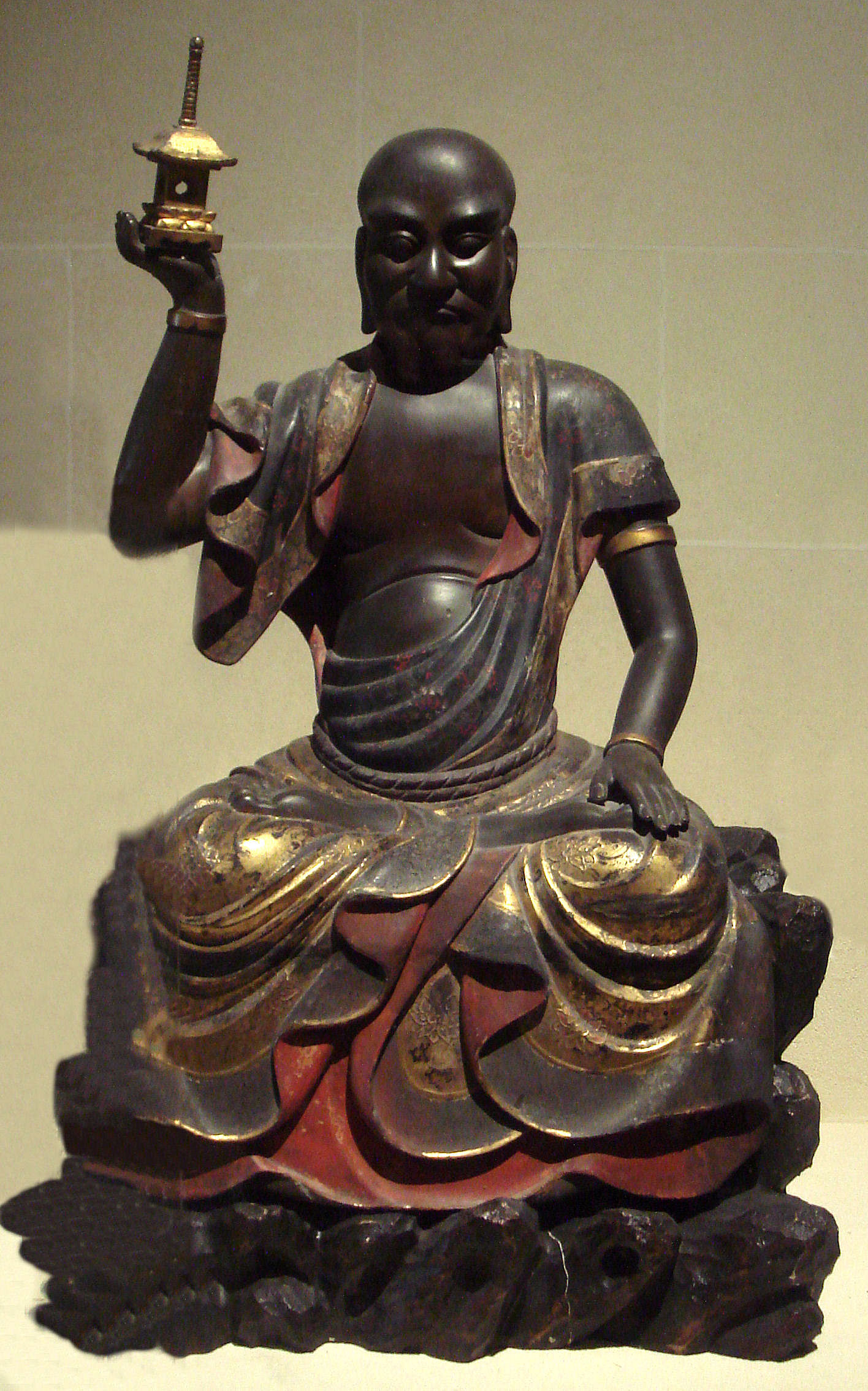
Ingada sonja holding a stupika in his right hand. Musée Guimet.

Aṅgaja (Japanese: 因掲陀尊者, Ingada sonja) is one of the Sixteen Arhats or Rakan (Japanese: 十六羅漢, Juroku Rakan) of Buddhism, saintly men who were predecessors or disciples of the Buddha. Other such arhats are Binzuru sonja, Ragora sonja, Chudahandaka sonja etc... Aṅgaja is part of the Buddhist Pantheon of Mahayana and Vajrayana Buddhism. He also appears, with other Rakan except for Binzuru sonja, in the Temples and Monasteries of Zen Buddhism, where they are shown as models to be emulated.
