= Stupika =

Small votive stupa

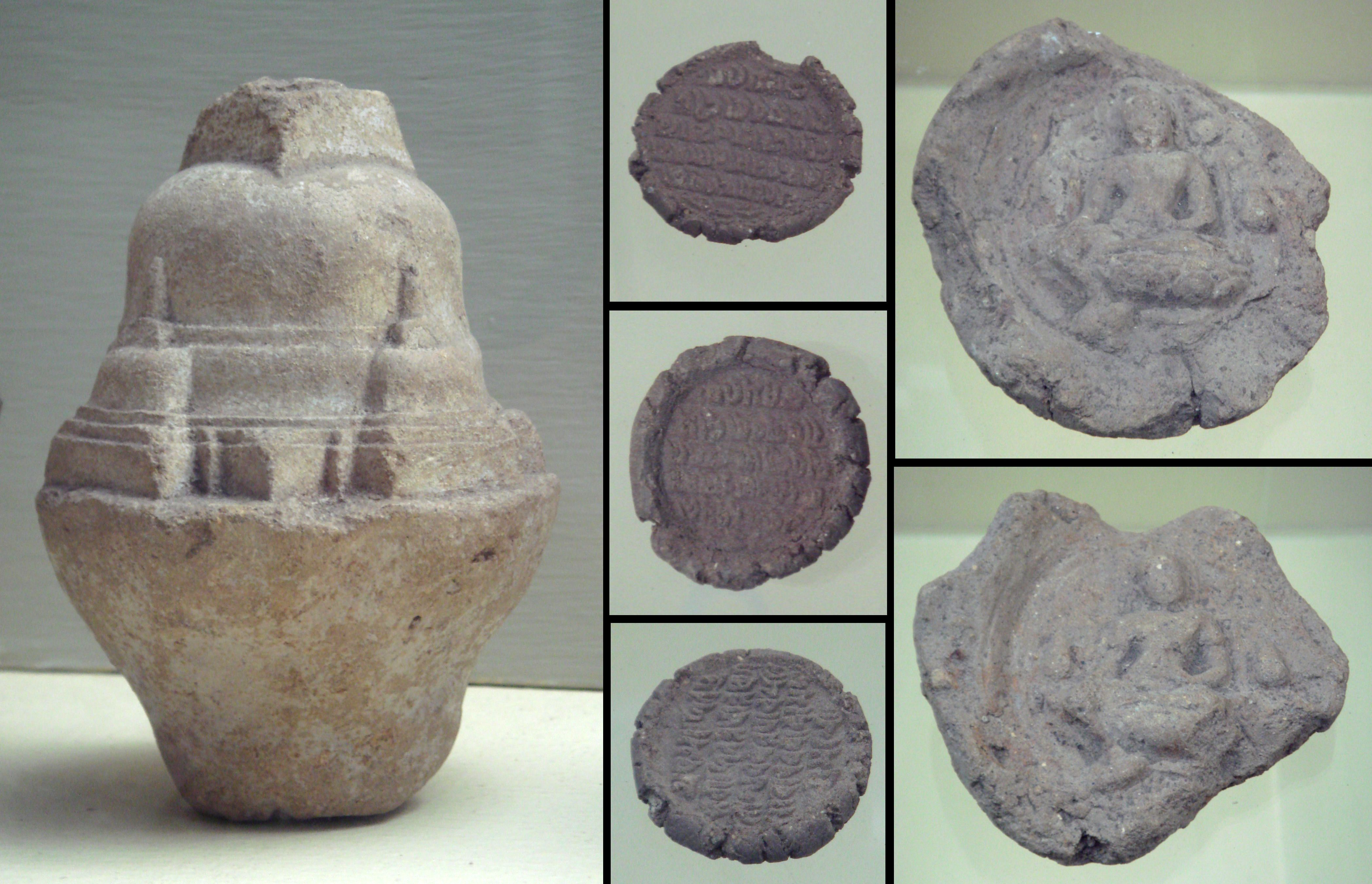
Buddhist model clay stupa ("Stupika") inside which can be found clay tablets with Buddhist texts and Buddhist images. 8th century Bali.

A stupika is a small votive stupa. It is often accompanied by small votive tablets with Buddhist formulae, or small Buddhist images. The stupika can also be the topmost part of a building, particularly a Hindu temple.
