= Swayambhunath =

Buddhist temple in Kathmandu, Nepal

Swayambhu or Swayambhu Mahachaitya
- स्वयम्भू महाचैत्य
- UNESCO World Heritage Site of Swayambhu

- Location within Kathmandu Location within Bagmati Province Location within Nepal

Religion
- Affiliation: Buddhism

Location
- Location: Swayambhu, Kathmandu
- Country: Nepal
- Coordinates: 27°42′54″N 85°17′24″E

UNESCO World Heritage Site
- Criteria: Cultural: (iii)(iv)(vi)
- Designated: 1979 (3rd session)
- Part of: Kathmandu Valley
- Reference no.: 121bis-004

Protected Ancient Monument
- Law: Ancient Monuments Preservation Act, 2013 (1956)
- ID: NP-KMC15-41

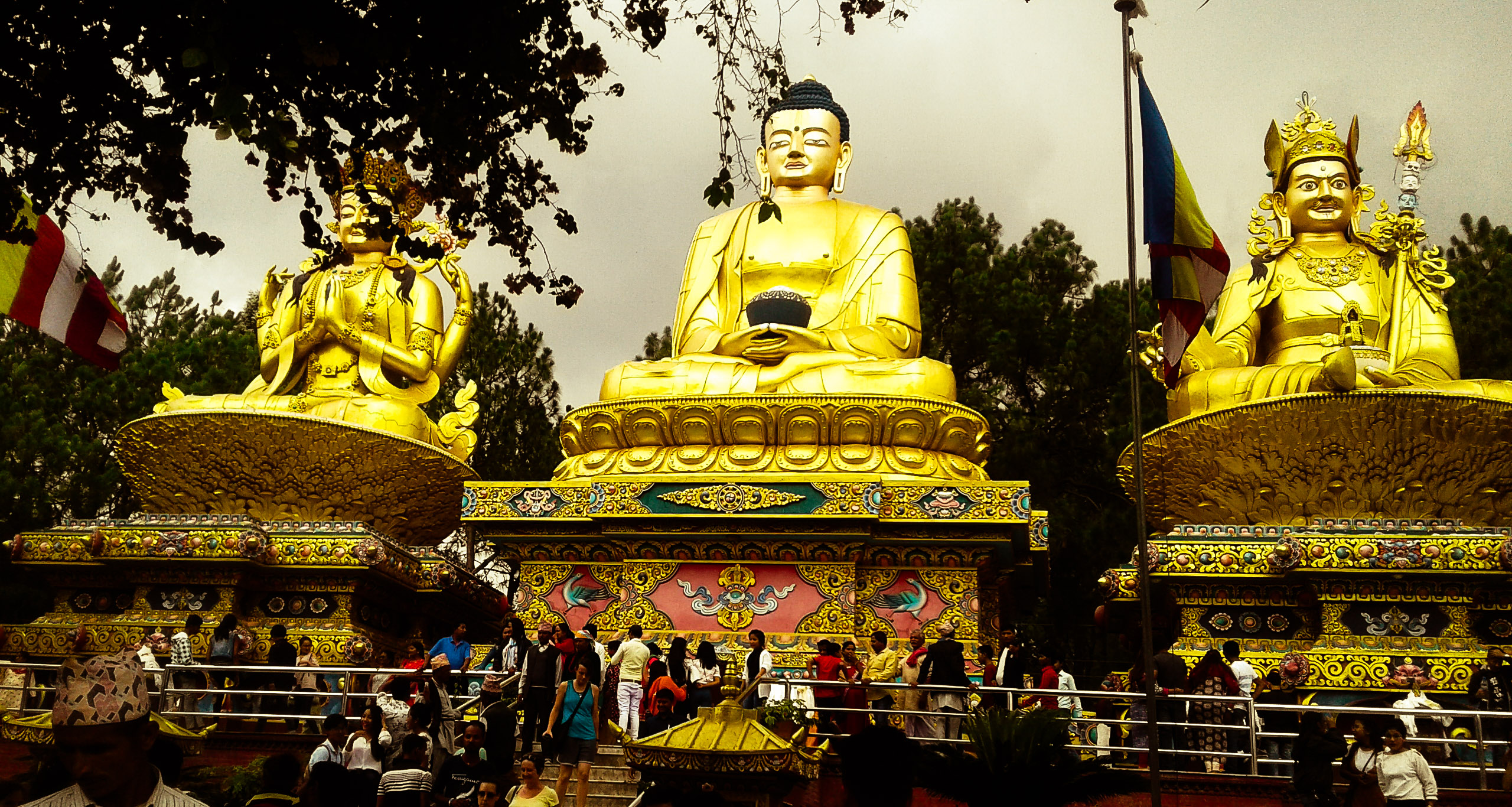
Seated Buddha statues in Swayambhunath

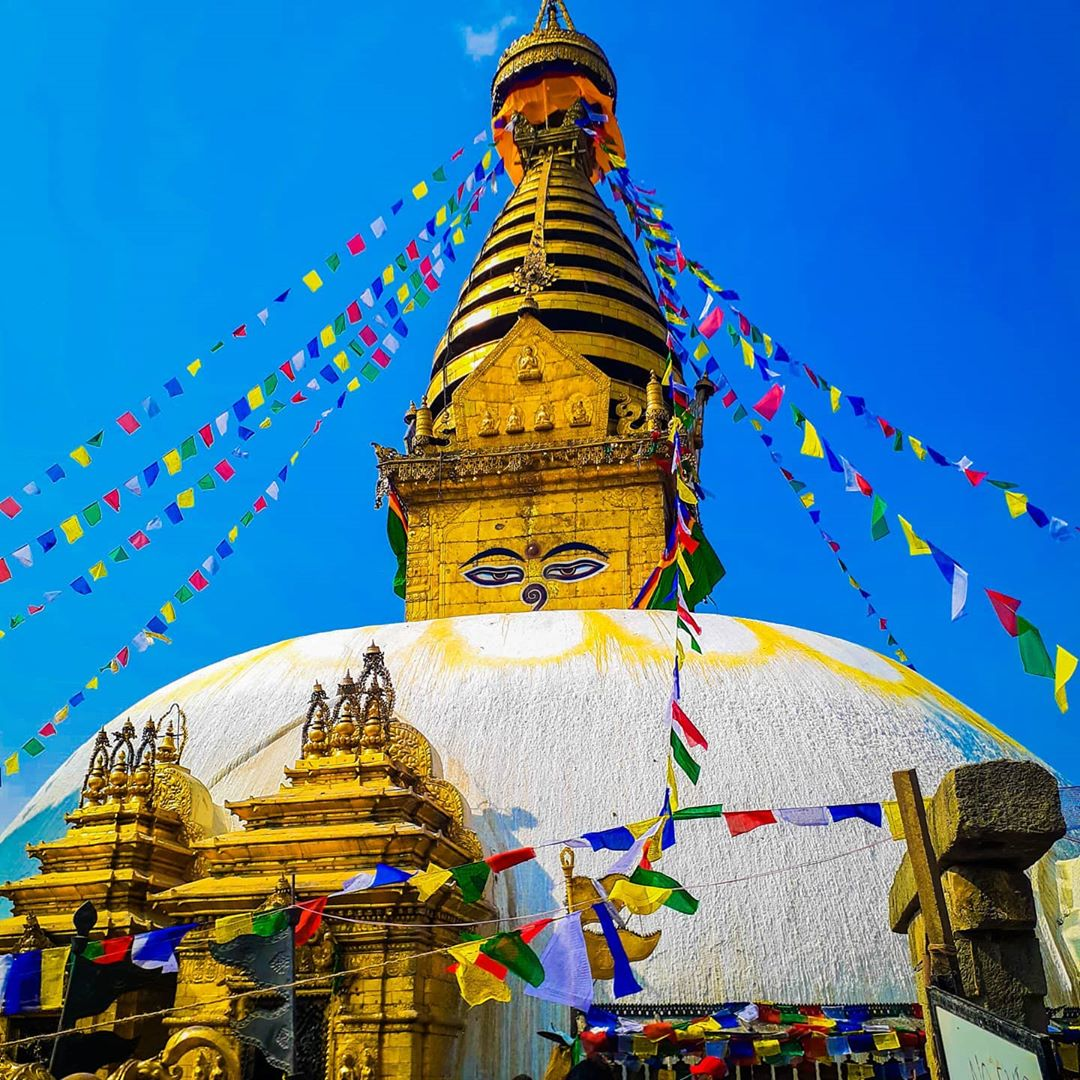
Main stupa of Swayambhu

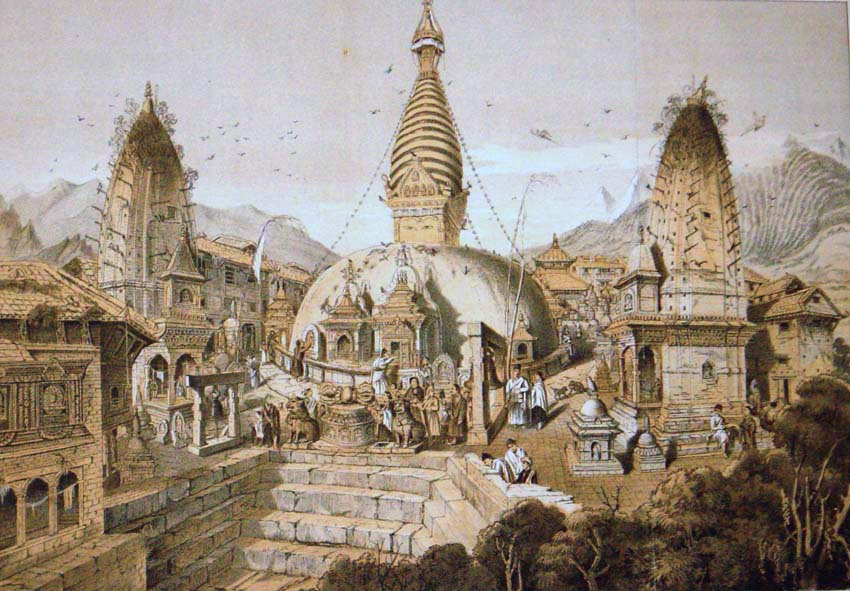
Swayambhunath in 1877

Swayambhunath (Devanagari: स्वयम्भू स्तूप; Nepal Bhasa: स्वयंभू; Swayambhu Great Stupa, or Swayambu or Swoyambhu) is an ancient religious complex atop a hill in the Kathmandu Valley, west of Kathmandu city in Nepal. The Tibetan and Sanskrit name for the site means 'self-arising' or 'self-sprung'. The hill on which the stupa stands has been an ancient pilgrimage site considered the home of the primordial Buddha known as the Adi-Buddha. For the Buddhists throughout the world, the stupa is venerated as one of the most ancient and important stupas in the world, having hosted numerous Buddhas of the past: Koṇāgamana Buddha, Kakusandha Buddha and Kassapa Buddha. For its outstanding universal value, Swayambhunath was designated a UNESCO World Heritage Site in 1979.

For the local Newari people, the day-to-day religious practice at Swayambhu occupies a central position, and it is among the three most sacred Buddhist pilgrimage sites. For Tibetans and followers of Tibetan Buddhism, it is second only to Boudha. Much of Swayambhu's iconography comes from the Vajrayana tradition of Newar Buddhism. The complex is an important site of pilgrimage and reverence for Buddhists of many schools and is also revered by Hindus. The stupa stands as a symbol of religious harmony with Hindu temples and deities incorporated in this ancient Buddhist site with thousands of Buddhists and Hindus visiting the site in cultural unison. The temple complex and hill-site is also home to families of wandering monkeys and is also therefore nicknamed as 'the Monkey Temple'.

== History ==
=== Mythology ===
According to Swayambhu Purana, during the golden age, the valley of Kathmandu was a lake where mythical serpents (Nāgas) like Karkotaka, Takshaka and Kulika dwelled and the Buddhas, Boddhisatwas, hermits, yogis, gods and goddesses besides other celestial beings used to come to have ablution in its water. One day Vipassī Buddha of many eons ago visited the lake and sowed the seed of a lotus in it which grew into a lotus flower with thousand petals. The flower emitted eternal radiant form of light (Jyotirupa) with the Five Great Buddhas, Vairocana, Akshobhya, Ratnasambhava, Amitābha and Amoghasiddhi appearing on each side of the differently coloured rays of the light. Having heard about this flower and ray of light, Sikhī Buddha and later Vessabhū Buddha came to pay homage from the surrounding peaks. After that, Buddha Manjushri came to the lake and pondered how to drain the lake so that people can traverse and pay homage to the radiant light. He drained the lake out of the valley by cutting the mountains with his indestructible sword; and created other lakes nearby to give shelter to the mythical serpents.

After Manjushree, other Buddhas Kakusandha Buddha, Koṇāgamana Buddha and Kassapa Buddha paid homage to the self-arisen light called Swayambhu, meaning "Self-Created". Kassapa Buddha returned to Kashi in India and preached about the self-arisen light and sent the king of Gaud (Bengal), Prachandadev to visit and worship Swayambhu. Prachandadev came to the valley and desired to make a great stupa to protect it, thus concealing the light and making only the great stupa visible. He sought ordination from a devotee of Manjushri, became a monk and established the stupa enshrining rituals and rites around it.

=== Ancient and medieval history ===
As per the scriptures such as Swayambhu Purana, Gautama Buddha paid homage and delivered sermon on the stupa. Among the listeners, Hariti, the fierce Dharma Protector goddess who was present in the sermon prayed to the Buddha with her determination to serve and protect the Swayambhu Great Stupa, vihars, Buddhist culture and children below 12 years of age. Her temple was enshrined near the main stupa of Swoyambhu.

Great stupa with Hariti Goddess temple, the fierce Dharma Protector and smaller stupas and pagodas in the foreground

Emperor Ashoka having embraced Buddhism after the Kalinga war, prayed in the birthplace of the Buddha in Lumbini and is said to have come to the site to pay homage in the third century BCE along with his spiritual master Upagupta Bhikku, his wife, Empress Tishyaraksha, and his daughter princess Charumati who married the Nepalese prince Devapala and erected temples in the site. Following the footsteps of Ashoka, Licchavi kings of the valley installed other stupas in the hillsite. According to the Gopālarājavaṃśāvalī, King Vṛsadeva, great-grandfather of King Mānadeva carried out many reconstruction work on the pilgrimage site; as confirmed by a damaged stone inscription which indicates that King Vrsadeva ordered work done in 640 CE. Other pilgrims who visited the stupa include Mahāyāna master Nāgārjuna from South India who stayed in the hill for 12 years. Acharya Vasubandhu came as a pilgrim but lived there until his death. Śāntarakṣita and Padmasambhava lived and performed rites and rituals in the stupa hill during their travels to Tibet and India.

In the 15th century, the Indian Buddhist monk and abbot of Bodh Gaya, Śāriputra led the reconstruction of the stupa which was noted to be in a bad condition at the time. He was assisted in this endeavour by a King of the Malla dynasty. Numerous Hindu monarch followers are known to have paid their homage to the temple, including Pratap Malla, the powerful king of Kathmandu, who is responsible for the construction of the eastern stairway in the seventeenth century.Marpa Lotsawa, the master of one of Tibet's most famous yogi Milarepa, and other numerous lamas from Tibet have historically paid homages to Swayambhu- a tradition that continues till present time. In 1504, Tibetan Buddhist master Tsangnyön Heruka was invited by the king of Kathmandu for a renovation of the stupa, which he completed within three months.

=== Recent developments ===
The stupa was completely renovated in May 2010, its first major renovation since 1921; the shrine was re-gilded using 20 kg of gold. The renovation was funded by the Tibetan Nyingma Meditation Center of California and began in June 2008.

The Swayambunath complex suffered damage in the April 2015 Nepal earthquake.

== Architecture ==
According to Vajrayāna Buddhism, Swayambhu represents the void from which the universe is created. The hemispherical dome is erected right from the passage of circumambulation and is surrounded by five meditating Buddhas. The stupa consists of a dome at the base, on top of which is a cube structure, painted with the Eyes of Buddha looking in all four directions. The gold plated bronze rings above the cubical structure are called Trayodashabhuvana (thirteen steps) representing the thirteen stages before reaching Nirvana.

The site has multiple access points: a long staircase leading directly to the main platform of the temple, which is from the top of the hill to the east; a car road around the hill from the south leading to the south-west entrance; and a less traveled stairway that meets the landing leading to the same south-west entrance. The first sight on reaching the top of the stairway is the Vajra.

== Swayambhu Purana ==
Swayambhu Purana (Devnagari: स्वयम्भू पूराण) is a Buddhist scripture about the origin and development of Kathmandu Valley. Swayambhu Purana gives details of all the Buddhas who came to Kathmandu. It also provides information about the first and the second Buddhas in Buddhism.

== Gallery ==
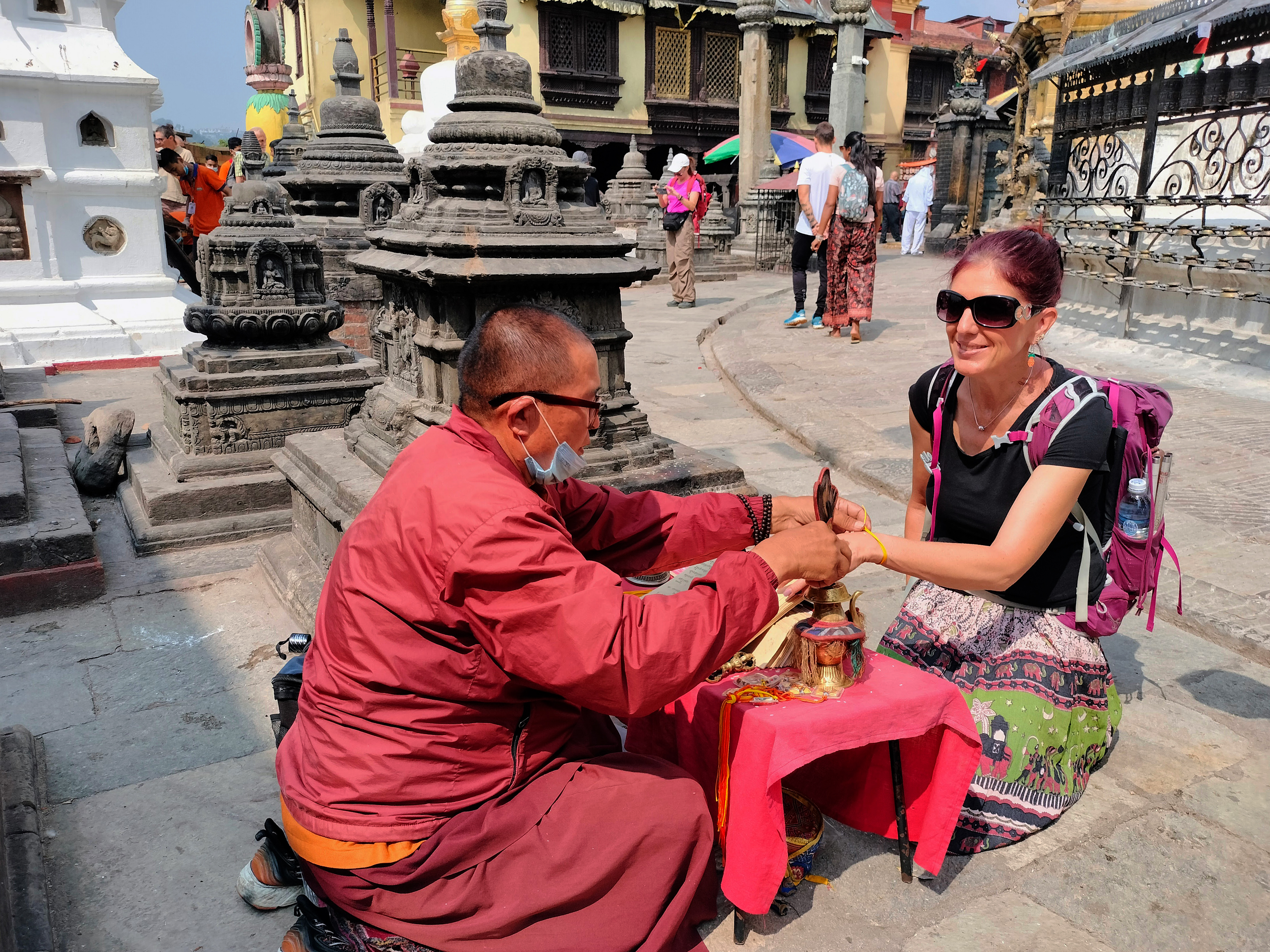
Buddhist priest performing ritual with a tourist

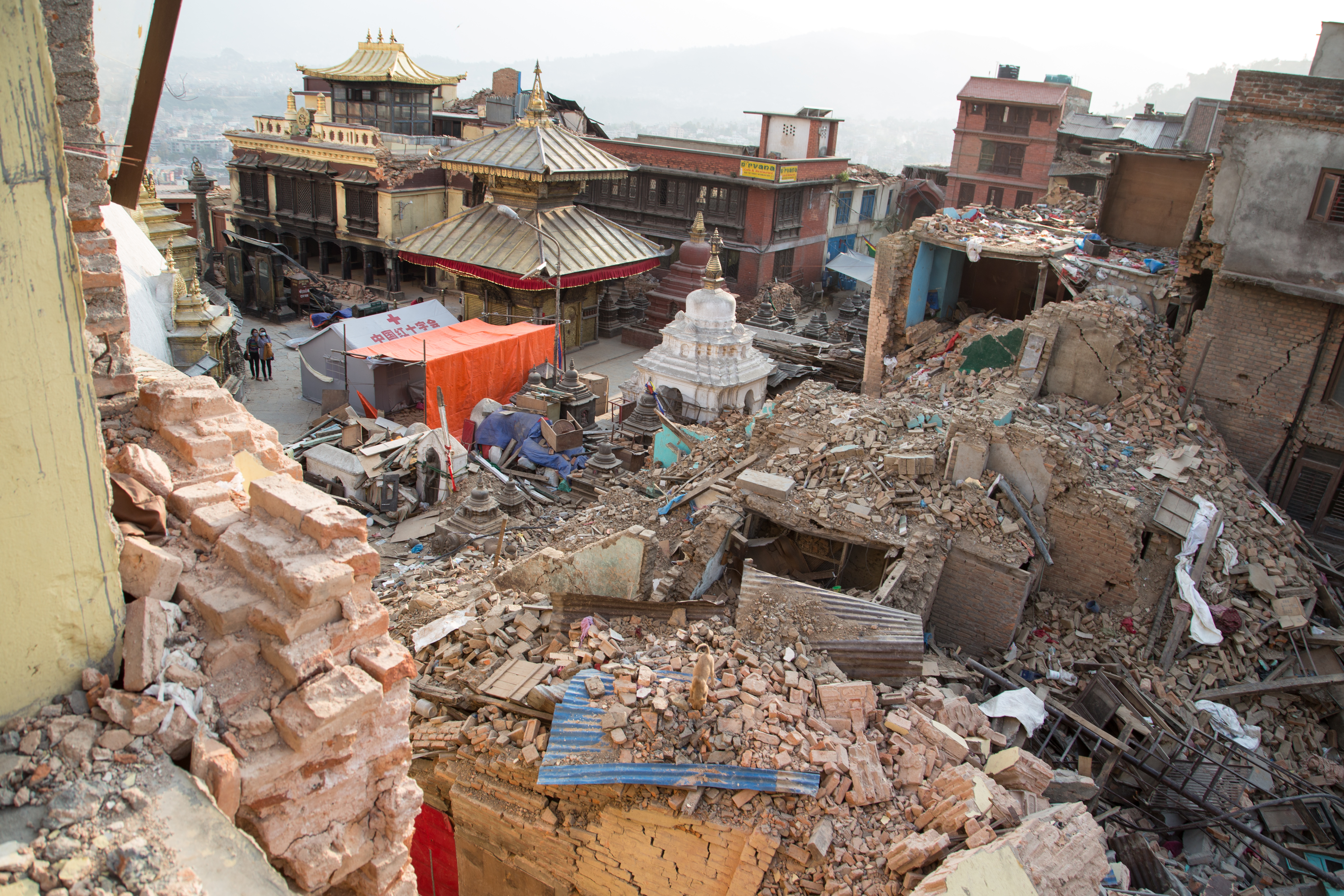
Swayambhu site after 2015 earthquake

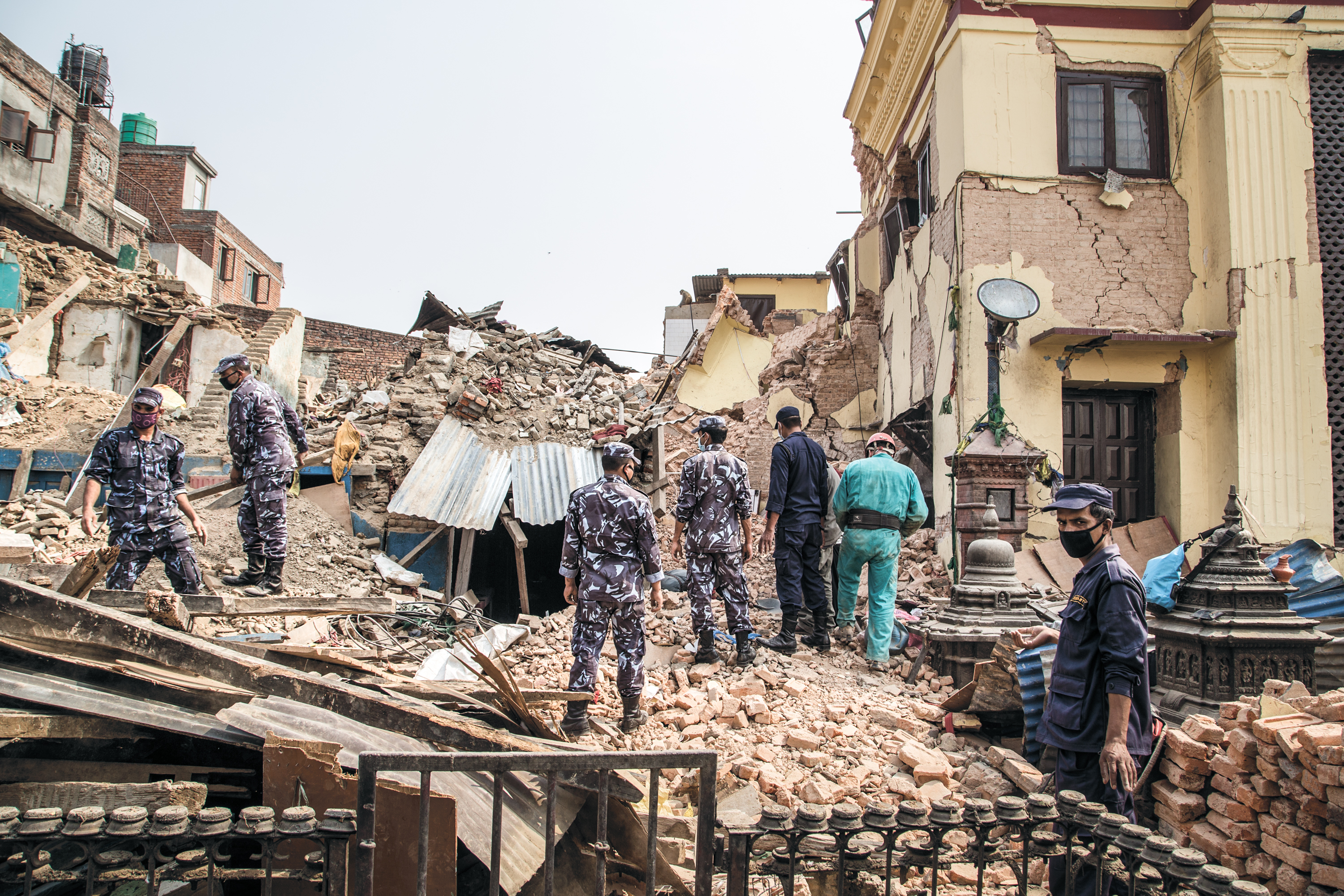
Swayambhu after 2015 earthquake

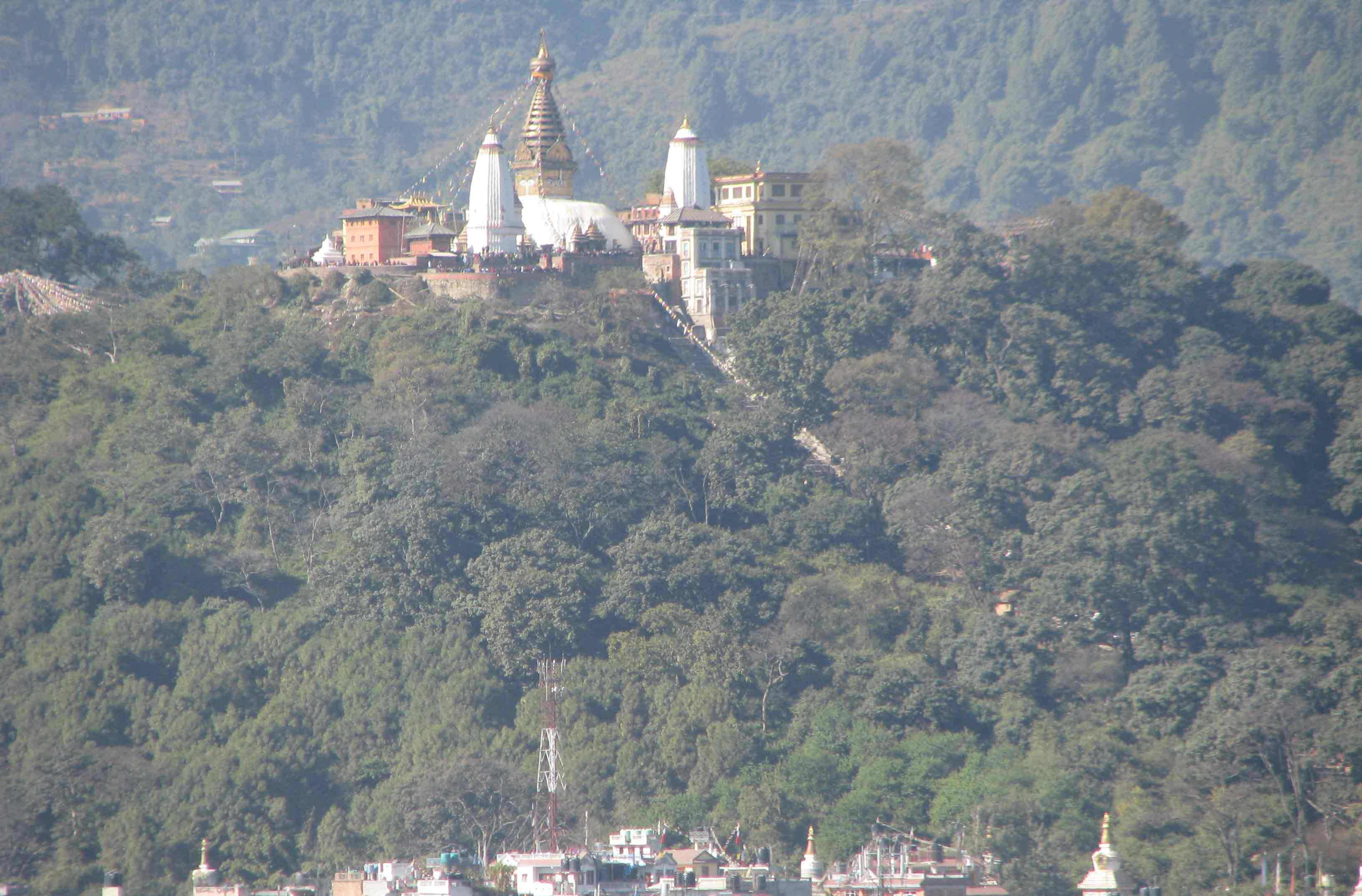
The hillock of Swayambhu

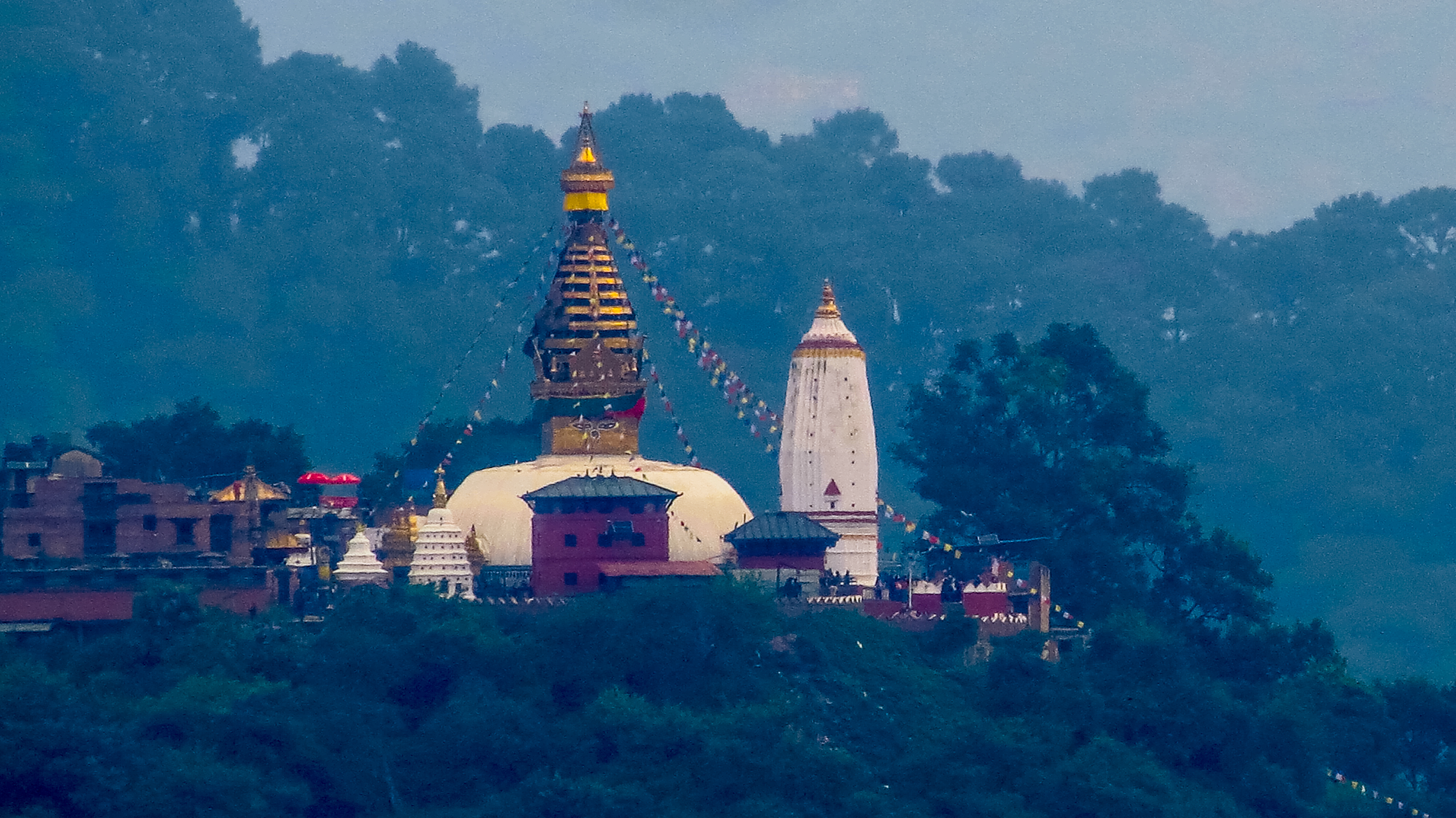
Swayambhunath Temple view from Kritipur Bhag Bhairav

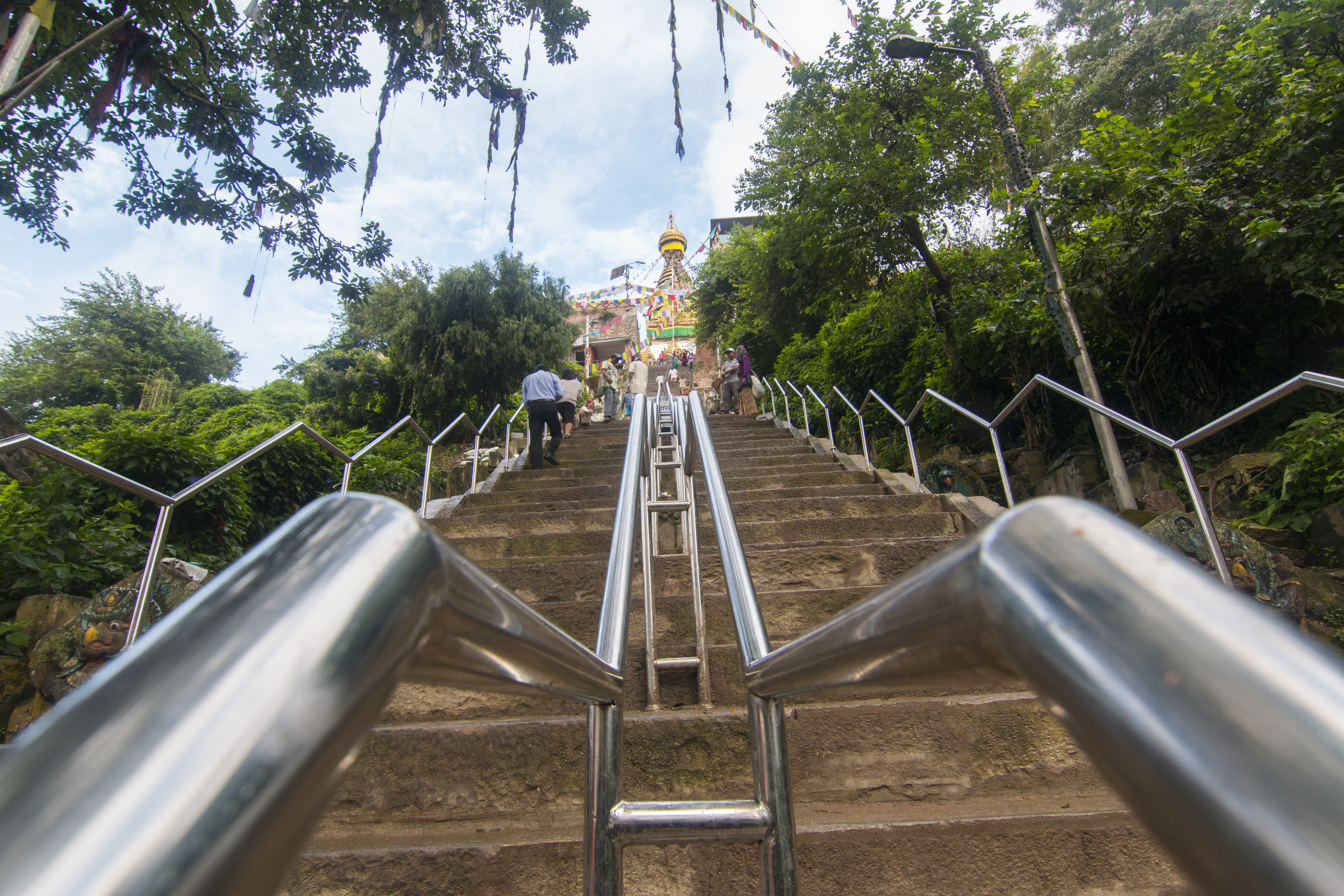
Eastern staircase

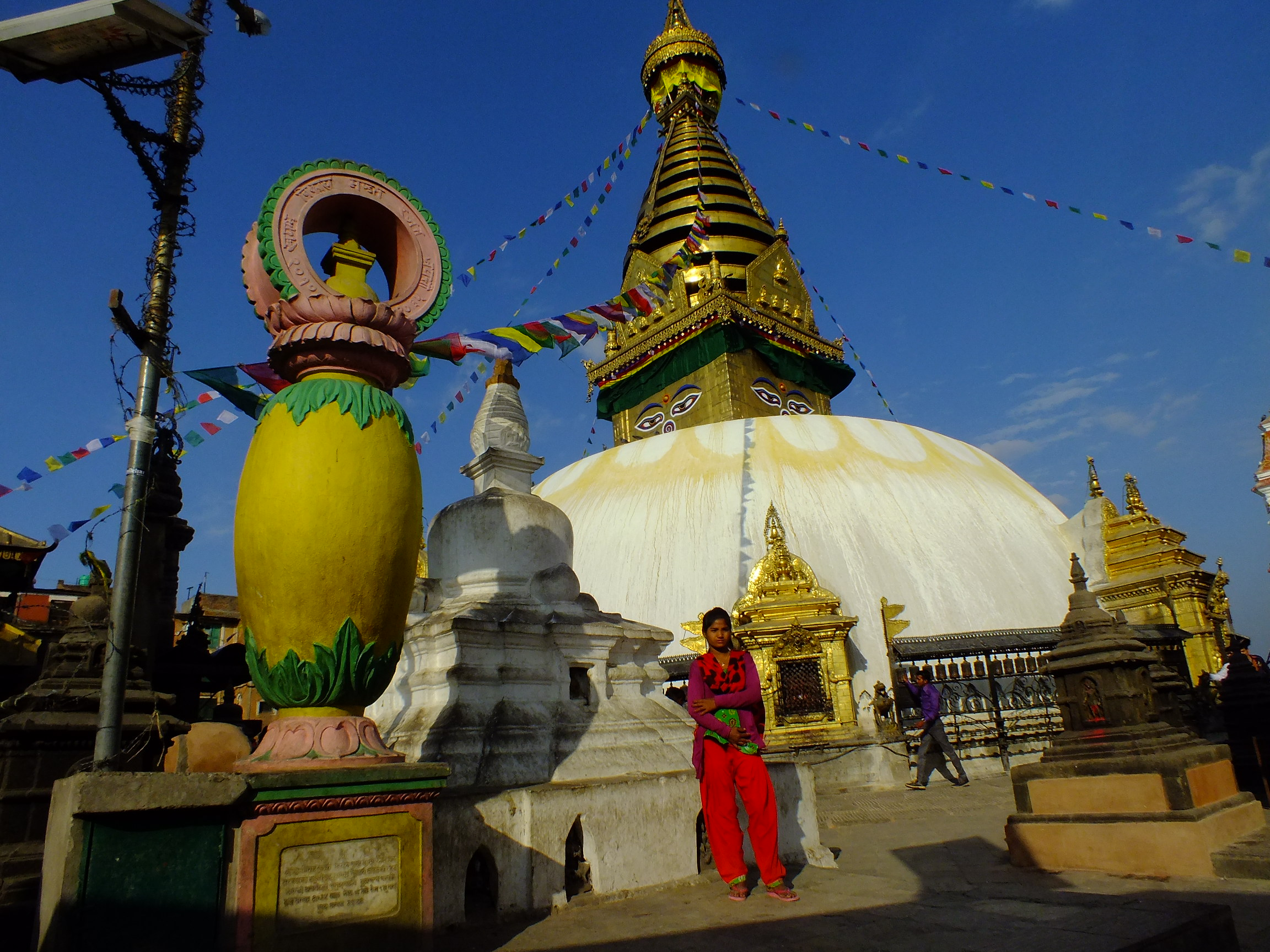
Swayambhunath stupa area

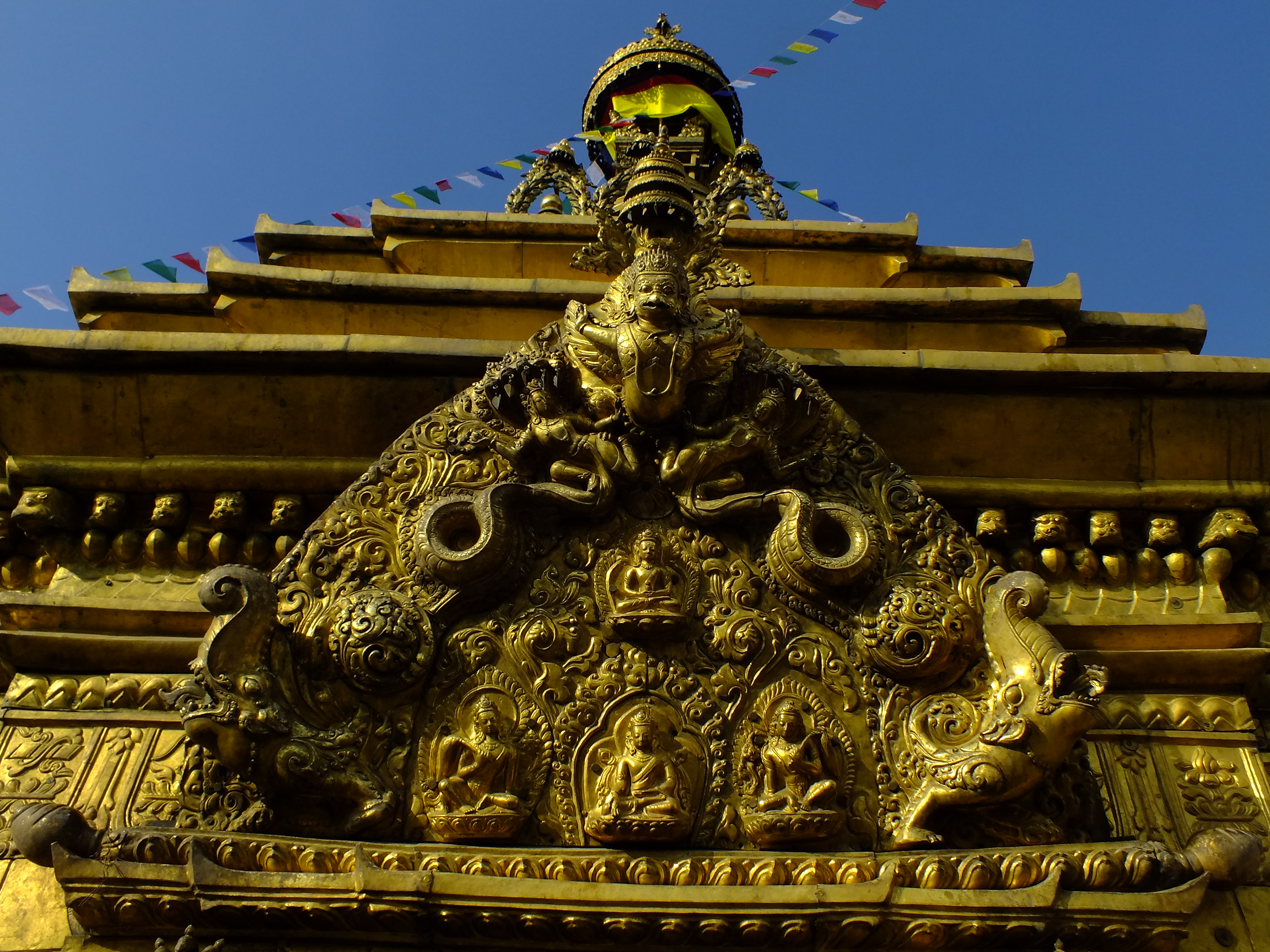
Close-up of Swayambhunath stupa

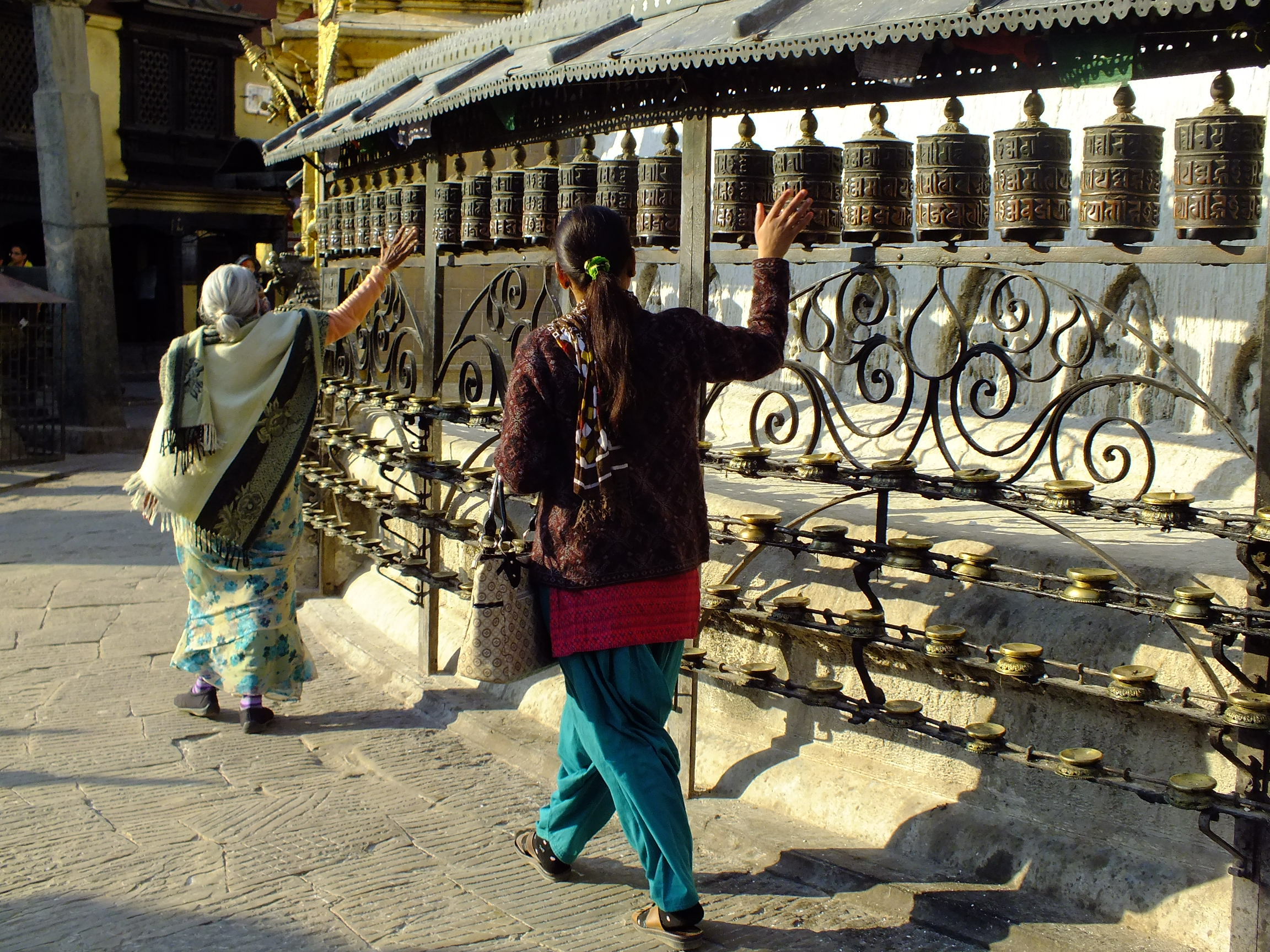
Base of the stupa

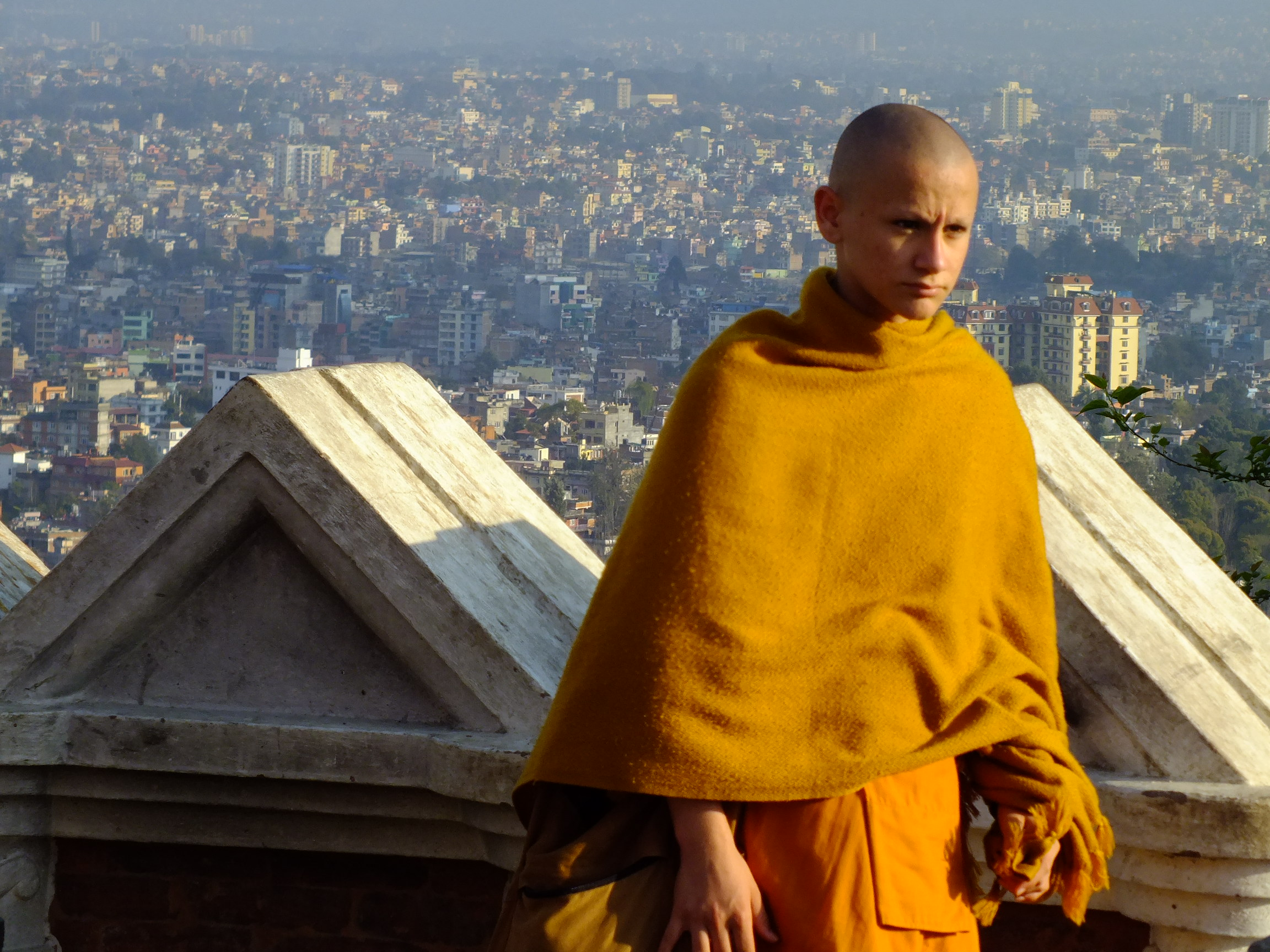
Monk at Swayambhunath

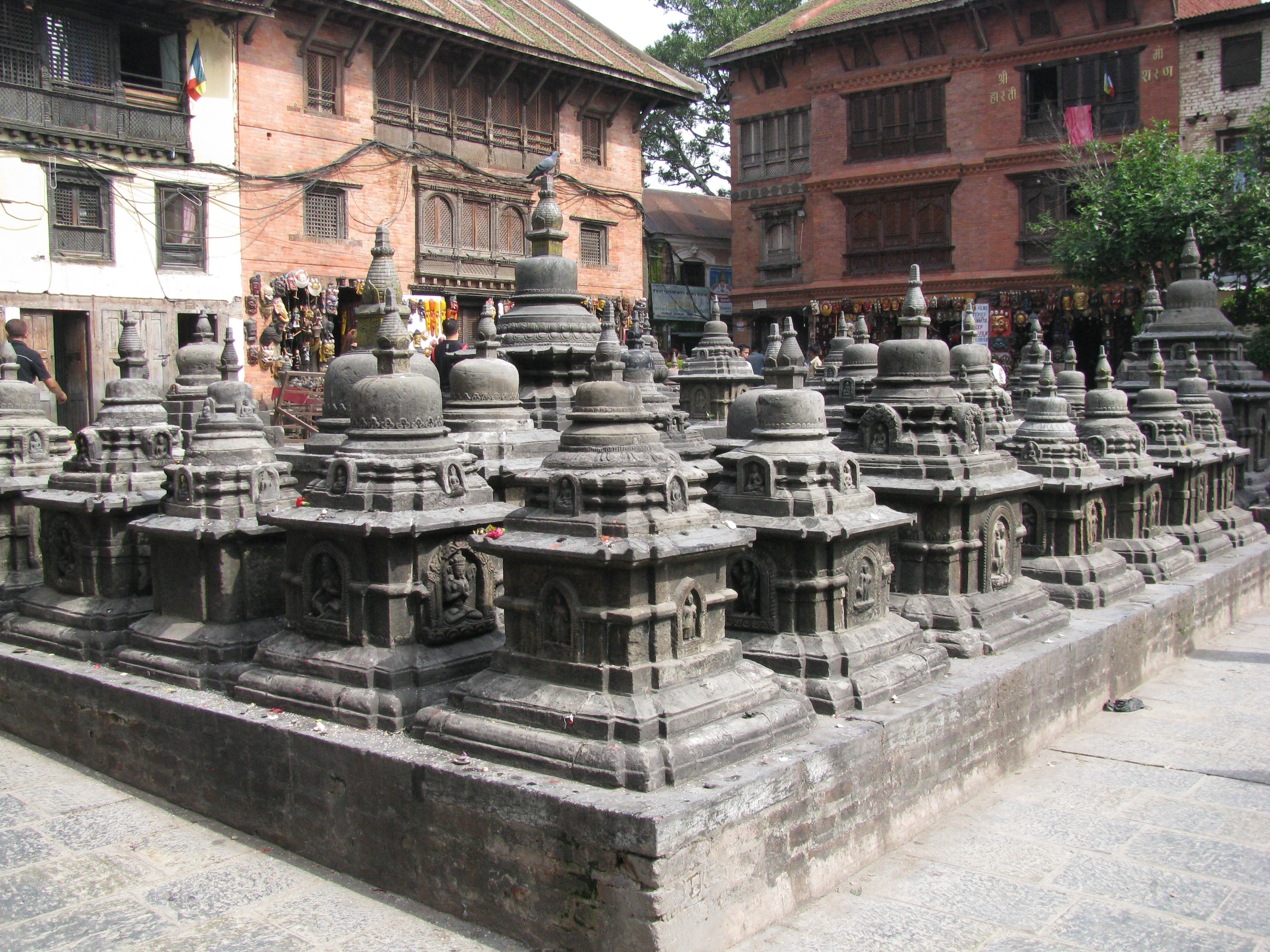
Chaityas Courtyard

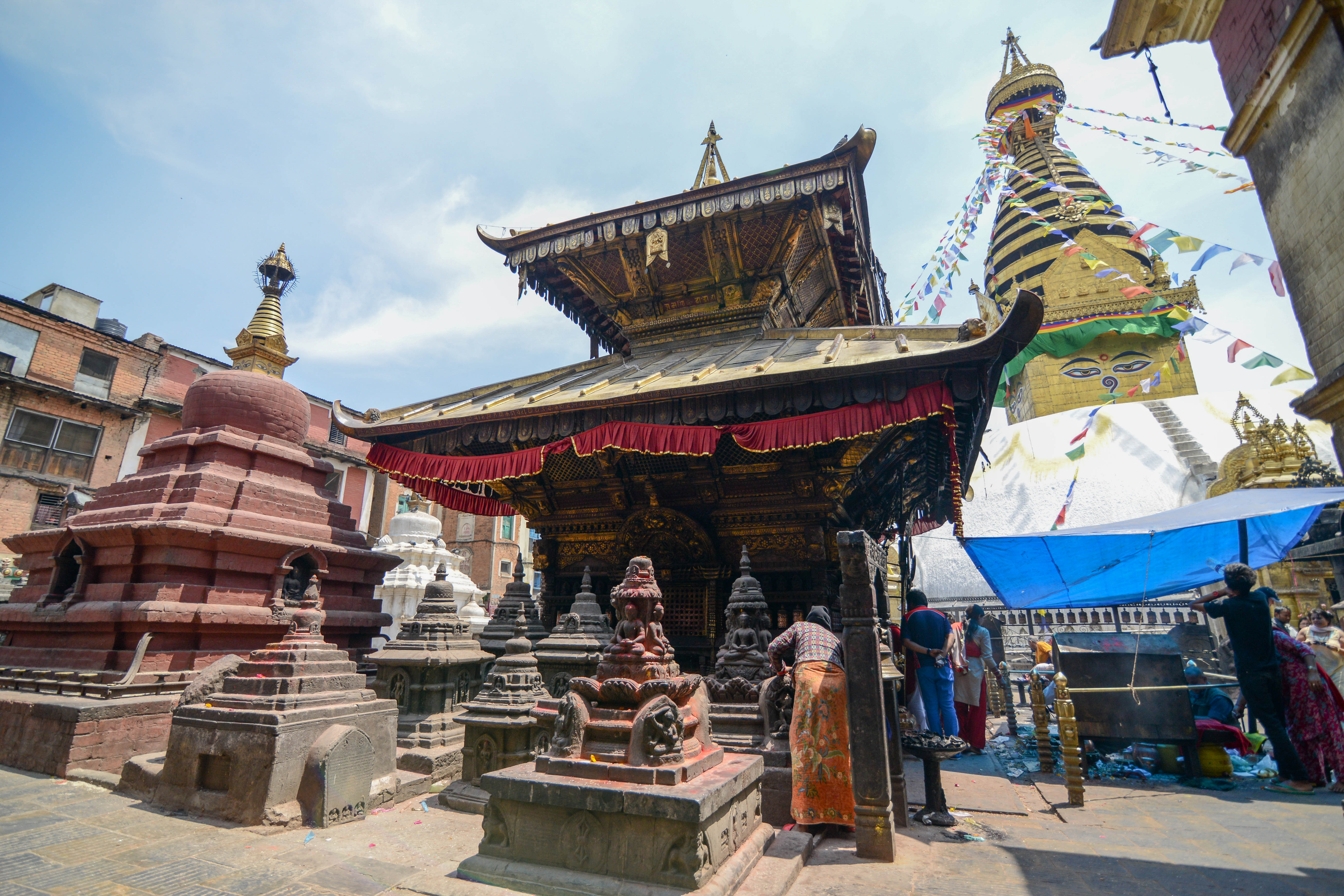
Ajima Temple

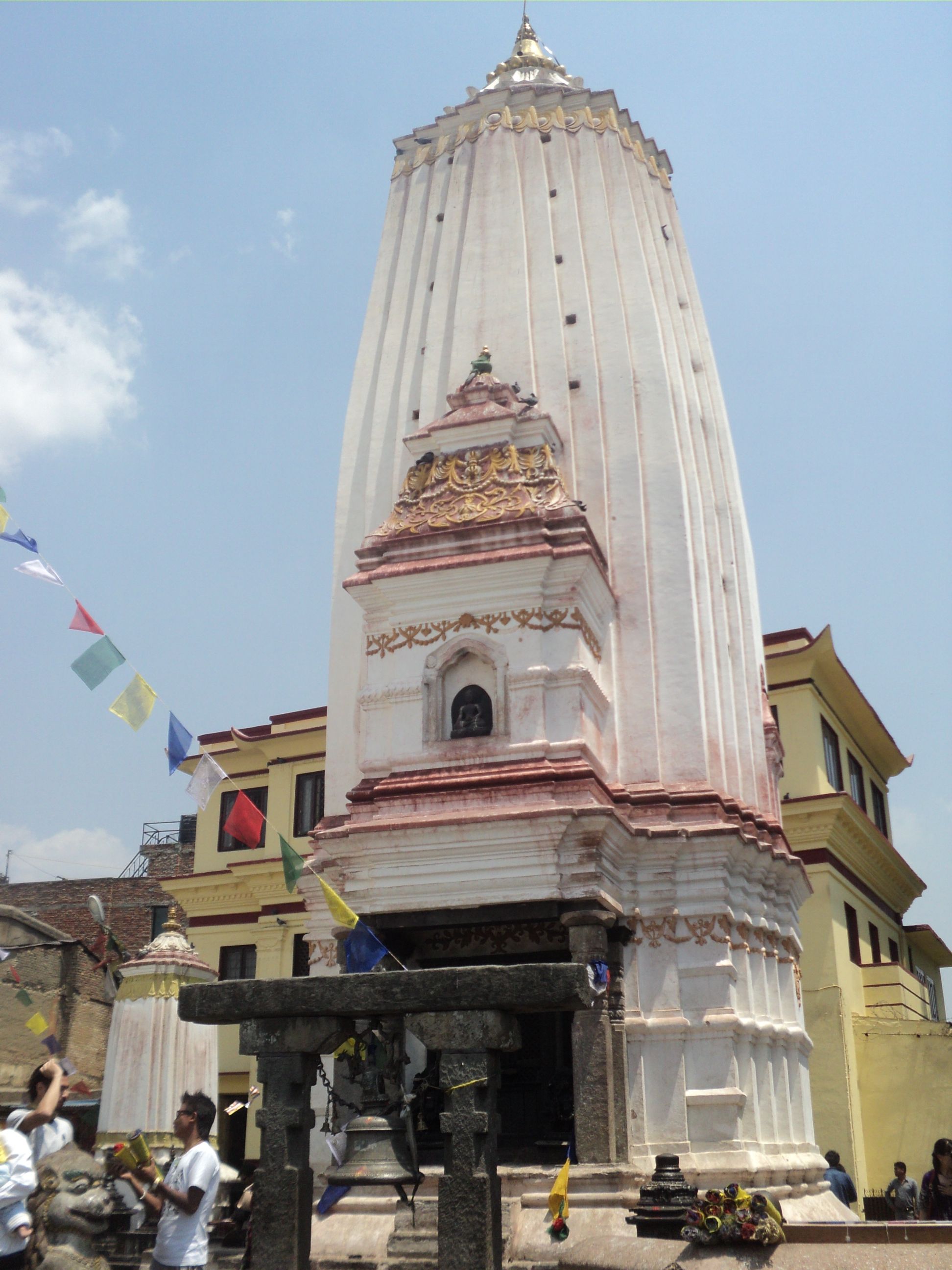
Shikhar style temple by Pratap Malla

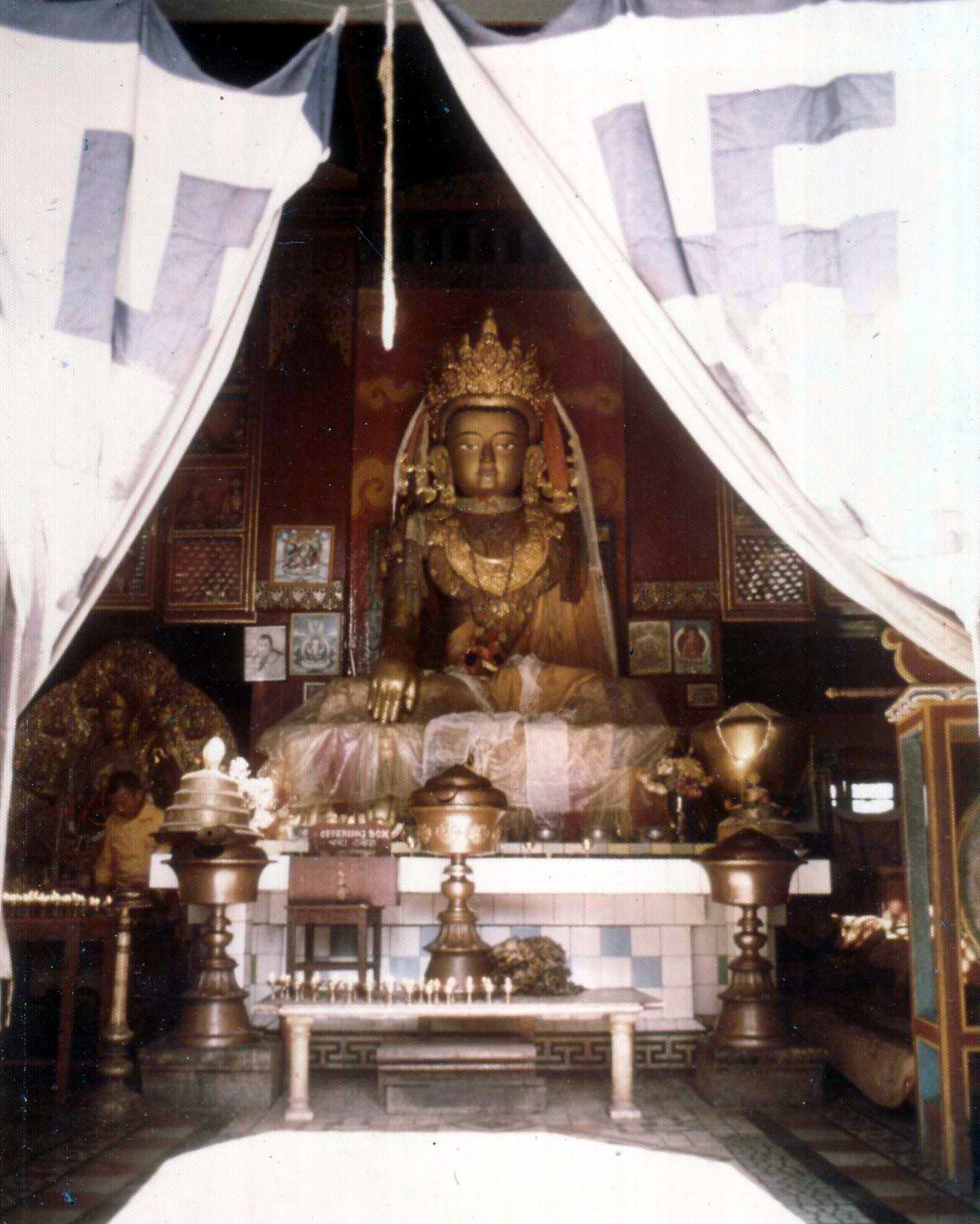
Buddhist gompa

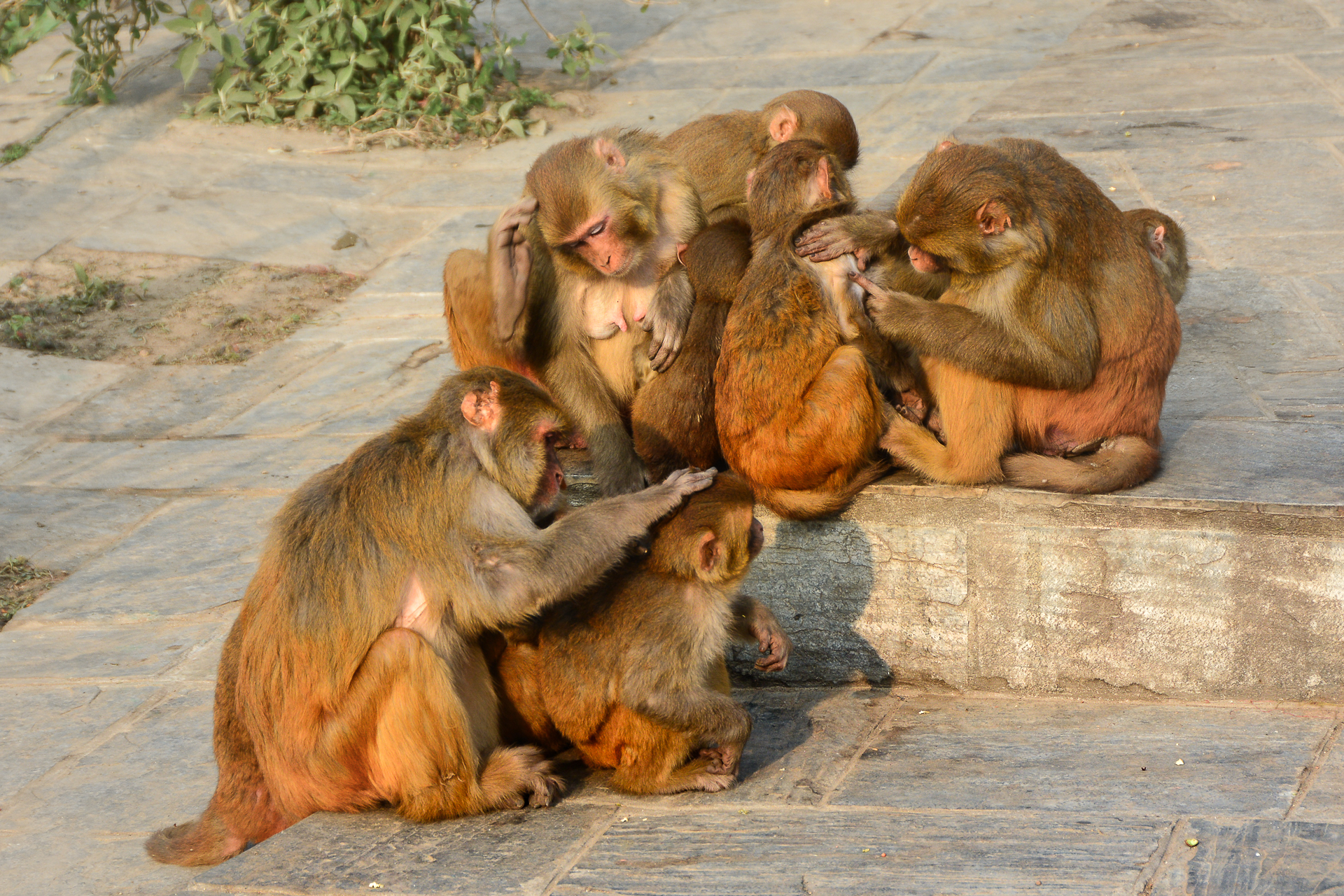
Temple Monkeys

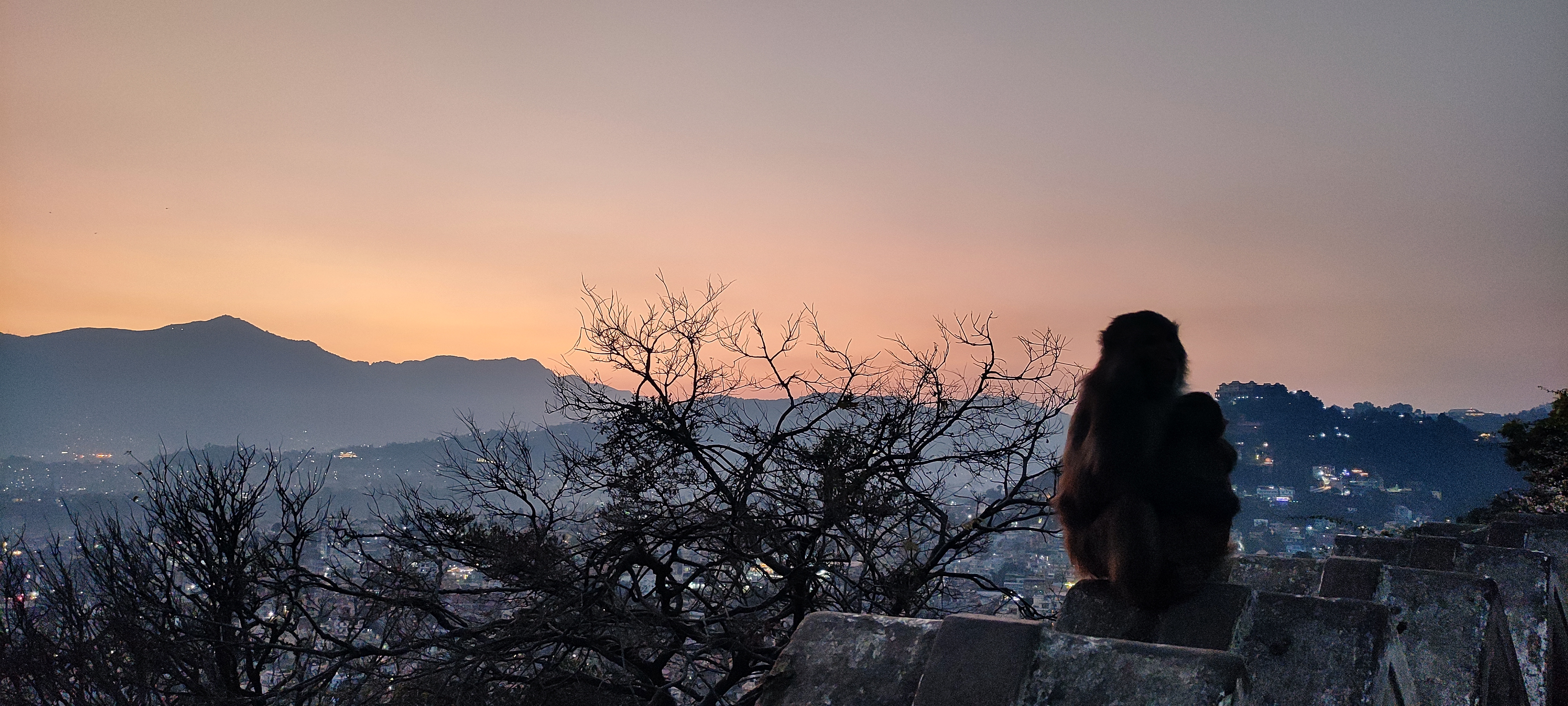
Sunset from Swayambhunath Mahachaitya

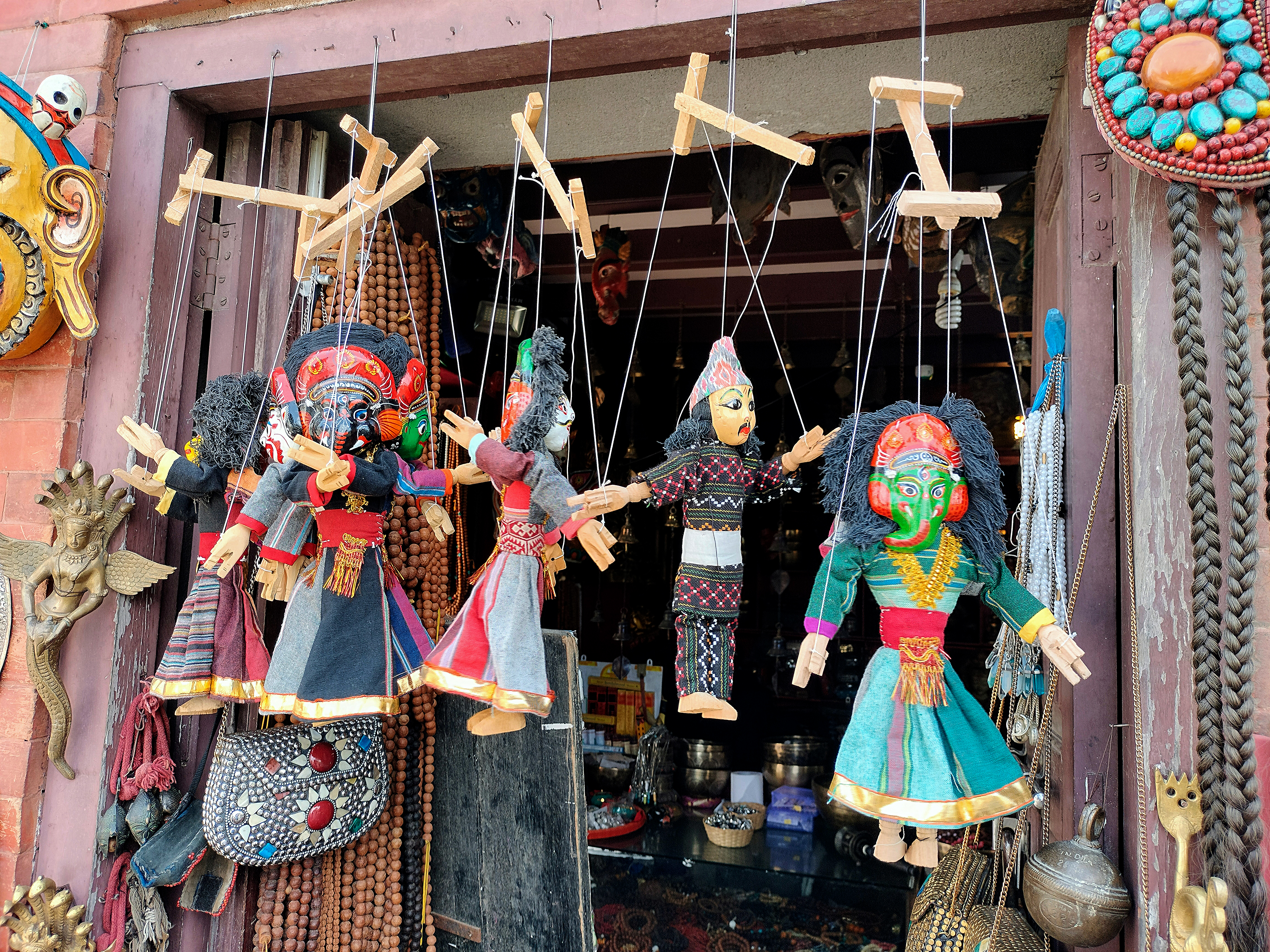
Folklore items selling at Swayambhunath

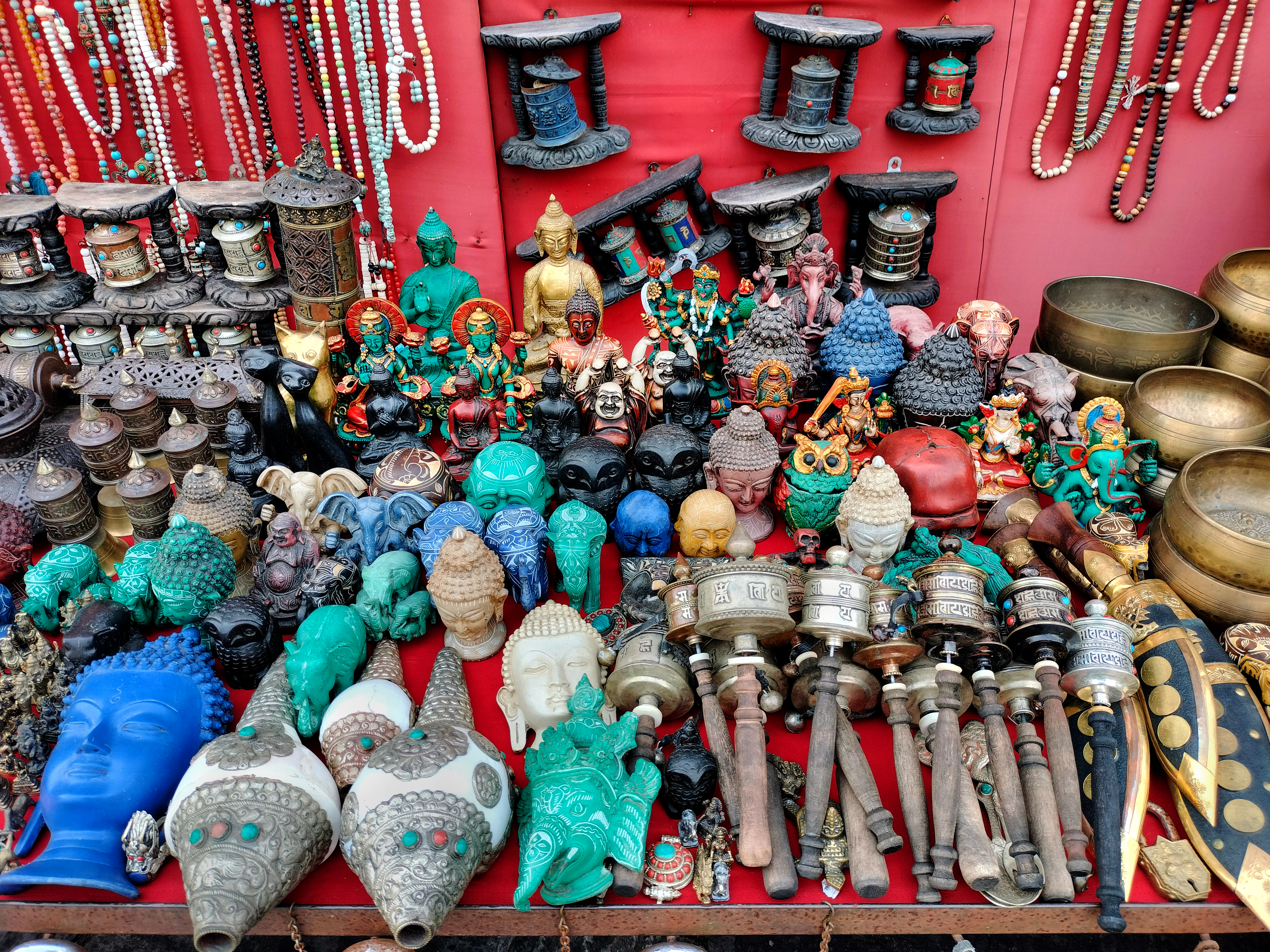
Folklore items selling at Swayambhunath

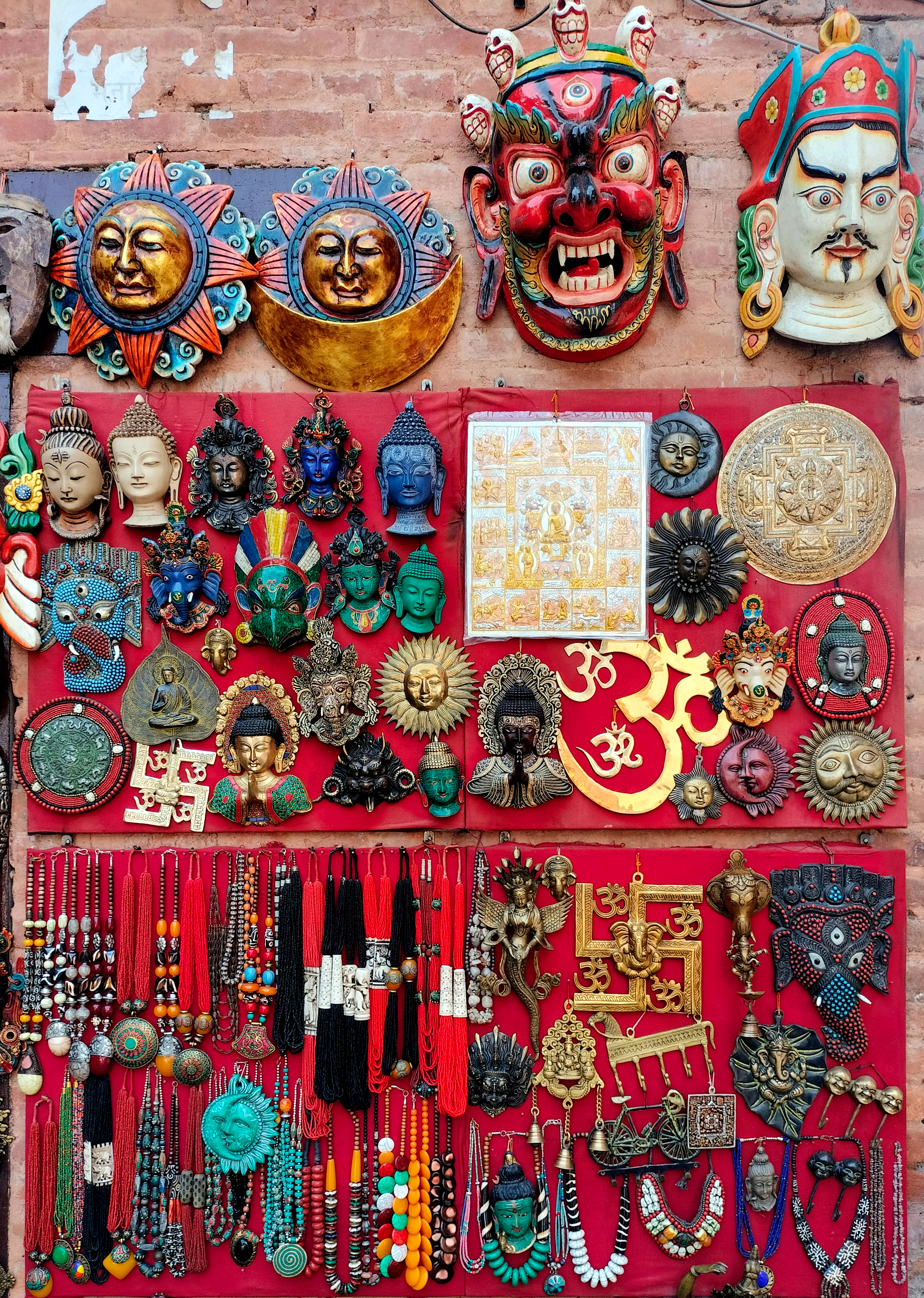
Folklore items selling at Swayambhunath

== See also ==
- Newar Buddhism
- Dharma Man Tuladhar
- Buddhist pilgrimage sites in Nepal
- List of Mahaviharas of Newar Buddhism
- List of monasteries in Nepal
- List of Stupas in Nepal
- Natural History Museum of Nepal
- Pashupatinath Temple
- Shamarpa
- Boudhanath

== Additional references ==
- Swoyambu Historical Pictorial. Edited by Richard Josephon. (1985). Satya Ho. Kathmandu.
- Psycho-cosmic Symbolism of the Buddhist Stūpa. Lama Anagarika Govinda. (1976) Dharma Books. Berkeley, California. ISBN 0-913546-35-6; ISBN 0-913546-36-4 (pbk).
