= Koṇāgamana =

One of the 28 ancient Buddhas

Koṇāgamana Buddha
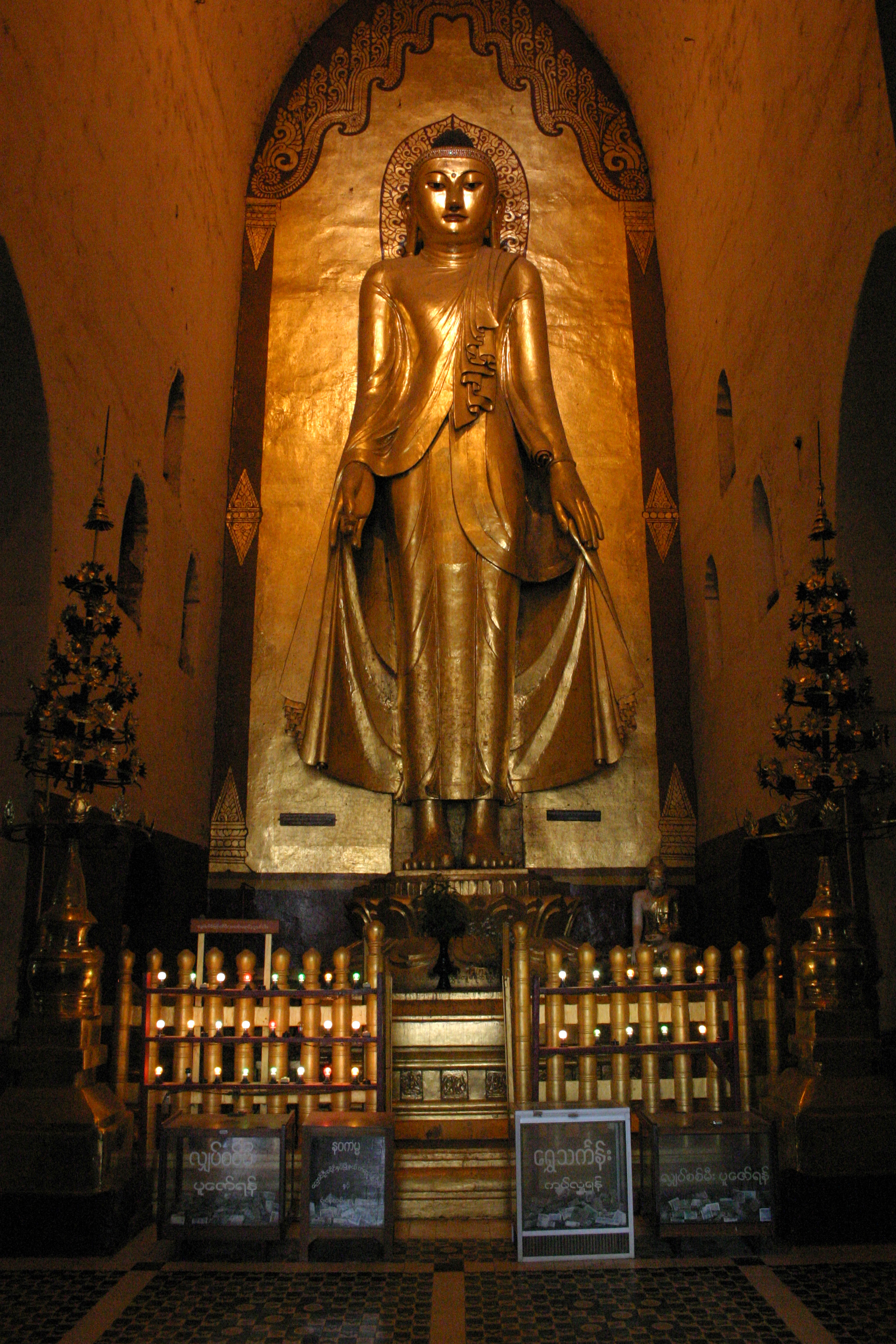
- East-facing Konagamana Buddha, Ananda Temple, Myanmar
- Sanskrit: कोनागमन (कनकमुनि); Konagaman (Kanakamuni)
- Pāli: Koṇāgamana
- Burmese: ကောဏာဂုံ [kɔ́nàɡòʊɰ̃]
- Chinese: 拘那含佛 (Pinyin: Jūnàhán Fó)
- Japanese: 倶那含牟尼仏(くなごんむにぶつ) (romaji: Kunagonmuni Butsu)
- Khmer: ព្រះពុទ្ធកោនាគមនោ Preah Puth Kaonakemeno
- Korean: 구나함모니불 (RR: Gunahammoni Bul)
- Mongolian: Канагамуни
- Sinhala: කෝණාගමන බුදුන් වහන්සේ Konagamana Budun Wahanse
- Thai: พระโกนาคมนพุทธเจ้า; Phra Konakhamana Phutthachao
- Tibetan: གསེར་ཐུབ་ Wylie: gser thub THL: Sertup
- Vietnamese: Phật Câu Na Hàm Mâu Ni; Phật Câu Na Hàm

Information
- Venerated by: Theravada, Mahayana, Vajrayana

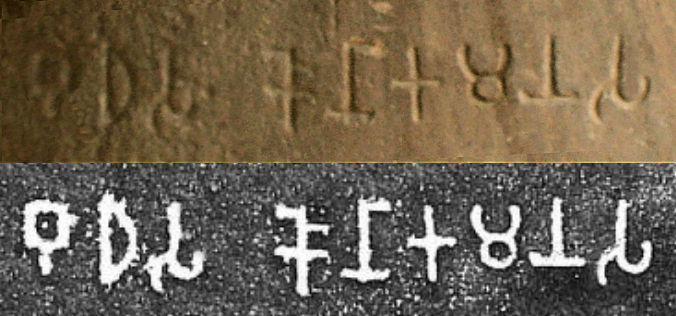
"Budha-sa Konākamana-sa" ("Of the Kanakamuni Buddha") inscription in the Brahmi Script, at Nigali Sagar, 250 BCE

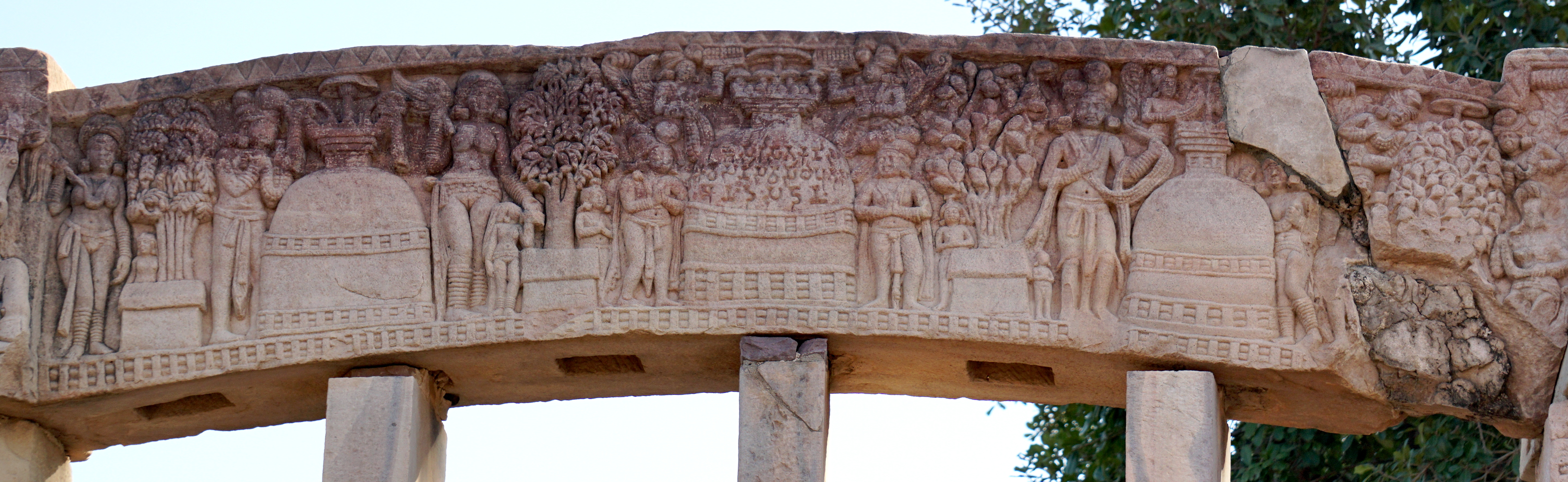
"The Seven Buddhas", at Sanchi (1st century BCE/CE). Six Buddhas of the past are represented, together with the current Buddha, Gautama Buddha, with his Bodhi Tree (at the extreme right). In the central section are three stupas alternating with four trees with thrones in front of them, adored by figures both human and divine. These represent six Buddhas of the past (namely: Vipassī Buddha, Sikhī Buddha, Vessabhū Buddha, Kakusandha Buddha, Koṇāgamana Buddha and Kassapa Buddha) with the current Buddha, Gautama Buddha. Three are symbolized by their stupas, and four by the trees under which each respectively attained enlightenment. The tree on the extreme right is the pipal tree of Gautama Buddha and the one next to it is the banyan tree of Kassapa Buddha. The identification of the others is less certain.

Koṇāgamana (Pāli), also known as Kanakamuni in Sanskrit or alternatively Koṇāgon or Kanakagamana, is one of the ancient Buddhas whose biography is chronicled in chapter 23 of the Buddhavaṃsa, one of the books of the Pali Canon.

== Buddhist tradition ==
According to Theravāda Buddhist tradition, Koṇāgamana is the twenty-sixth of the twenty-nine named Buddhas, the fifth of the Seven Buddhas of Antiquity, and the second of the five Buddhas of the present kalpa.

The present kalpa is called the bhadrakalpa (Auspicious aeon). The five Buddhas of the present kalpa are:

1. Kakusandha (the first Buddha of the bhadrakalpa)
2. Koṇāgamana (the second Buddha of the bhadrakalpa)
3. Kassapa (the third Buddha of the bhadrakalpa)
4. Gautama (the fourth and present Buddha of the bhadrakalpa)
5. Maitreya (the fifth and future Buddha of the bhadrakalpa)

Koṇāgamana is said to have been born in Subhagavati Park in Sobhavati (now known as Araurakot, located about 3 kilometres (1.9 mi) southwest of Nigalihawa) on Wednesday; because of this Koṇāgamana is placed on the Wednesday pedestal.

== Life ==
Koṇāgamana Buddha was born in Sobhavati, the capital of King Sobha (present day- Nigali Sagar, Nepal) within the serene Subhagavati Park. His father was Yannadatta who was a Brahmin, and his mother was Uttara. Koṇāgamana Buddha spent three thousand years in his royal household, residing in three palaces: Tusita, Santusita, and Santuttha.

According to Jataka, Koṇāgamana Buddha's height is traditionally described as 20 cubits high (approximately 30 feet or 9.14 meters). His chief wife was Rucigatta who bore him a son named Satthavaha. Koṇāgamana Buddha renounced the world on an elephant and practiced austerities for six months. He received milk-rice from Brahmin Aggisoma’s daughter and grass for his seat from the grain-watcher Tinduka. His enlightenment was attained under an Udumbara tree.

Koṇāgamana Buddha died at the age of thirty thousand in Pabbatārāma.

== Historical mentions of the Koṇāgamana Buddha ==
Koṇāgamana is mentioned in a 3rd-century BCE inscription by Ashoka at Nigali Sagar, in today's Nepal. There is an Ashoka pillar at the site today. Ashoka's inscription in Brahmi is on the fragment of the pillar still partly buried in the ground. The inscription made when Emperor Asoka at Nigali Sagar in 249 BCE records his visit, the enlargement of a stupa dedicated to the Kanakamuni Buddha, and the erection of a pillar:

"Devanam piyena piyadasin lajina- chodasavasa bhisitena Budhasa Konakamanasa thube-dutyam vadhite Visativa sabhisitena –cha atana-agacha-mahiyite silathabe-cha usa papite"
“His Majesty King Priyadarsin in the 14th year of his reign enlarged for the second time the stupa of the Buddha Kanakamuni and in the 20th year of his reign, having come in person, paid reverence and set up a stone pillar”.

According to Xuanzang, Koṇāgamana's relics were held in a stupa in Nigali Sagar, in what is now Kapilvastu District in southern Nepal.

== See also ==
- Bhadrakalpikasutra

== Gallery ==
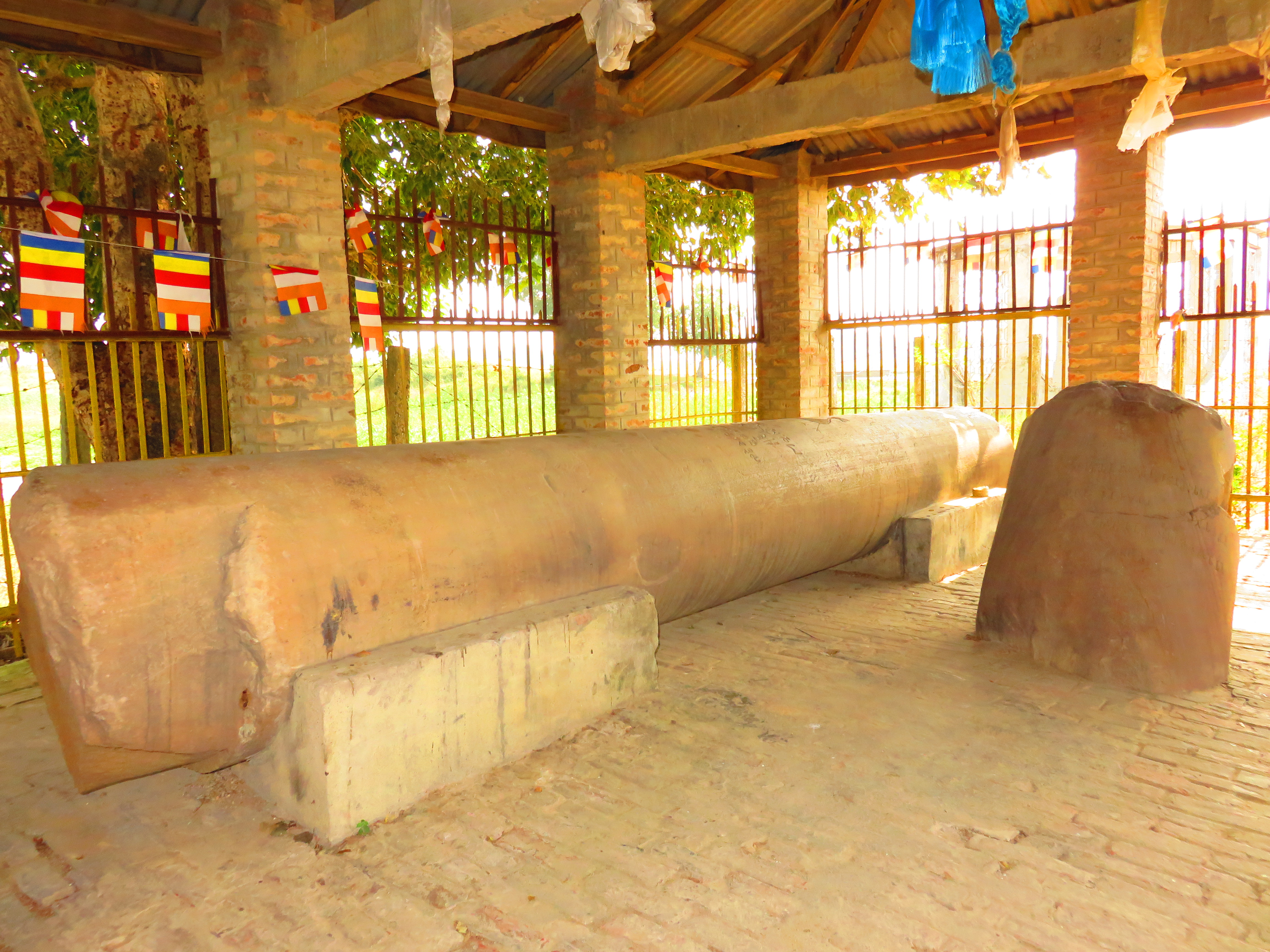
Nigali Sagar Pillar erected by King Ashoka to commemorate the birthplace of Koṇāgamana Buddha. Nigalihawa, Kapilvastu District, Nepal (inscription on the smaller fragment)

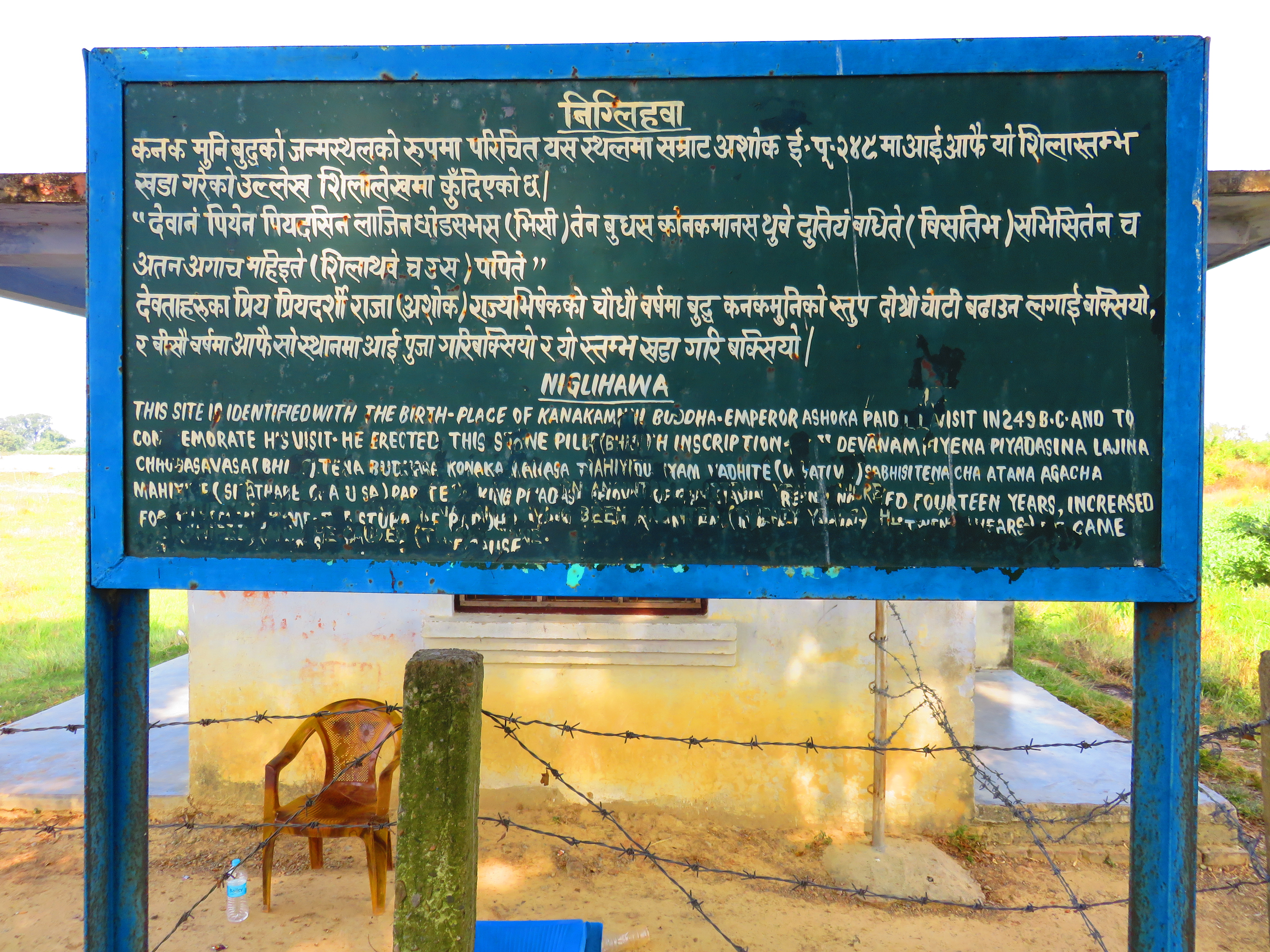
Birthplace of Koṇāgamana Buddha. Nigalihawa, Kapilvastu District, Nepal

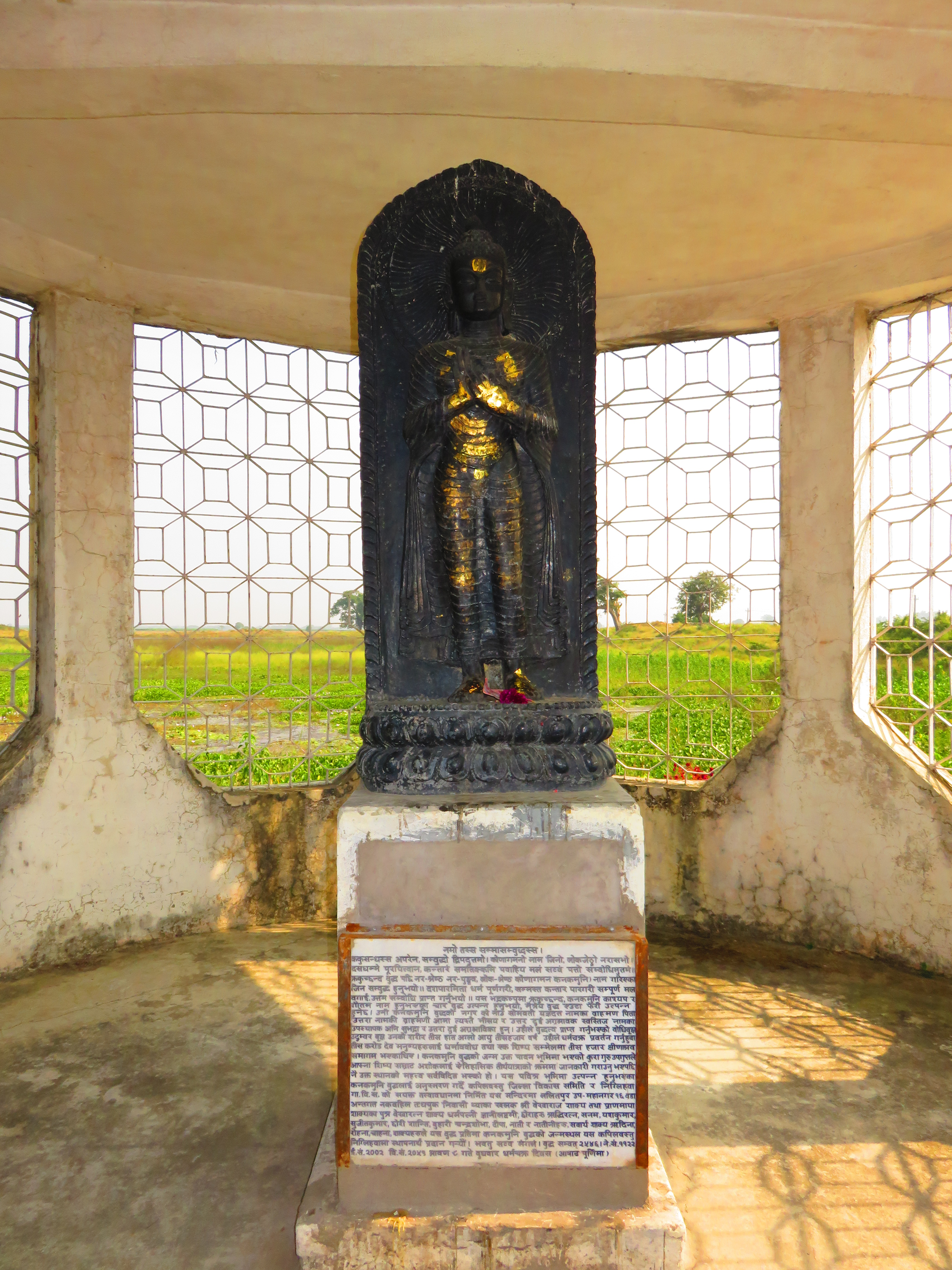
Statue commemorating the birthplace of Koṇāgamana Buddha. Nigalihawa, Kapilvastu District, Nepal

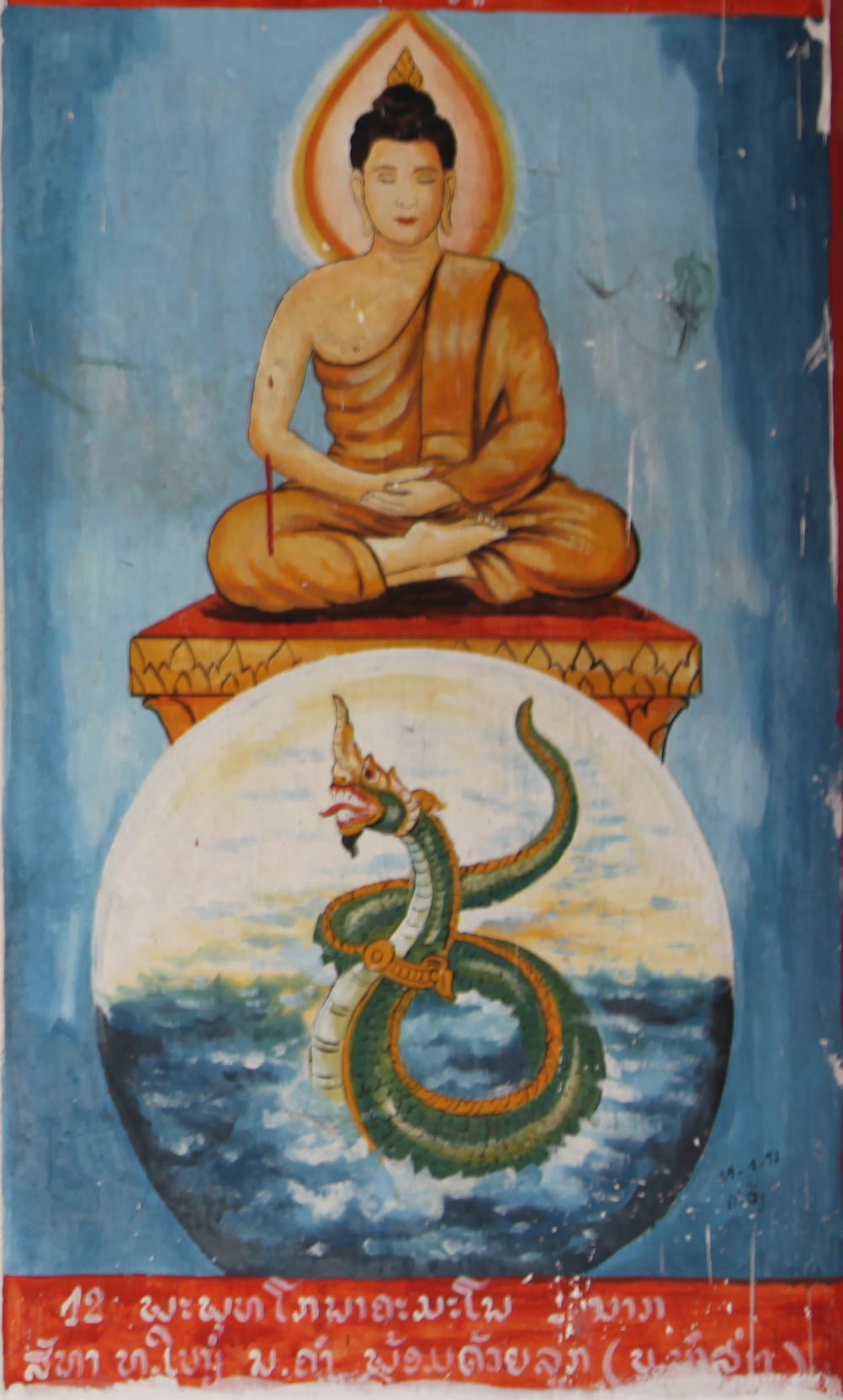
Detail of a mural depicting Koṇāgamana Buddha, Wat Ho Xiang, Luang Prabang, Laos

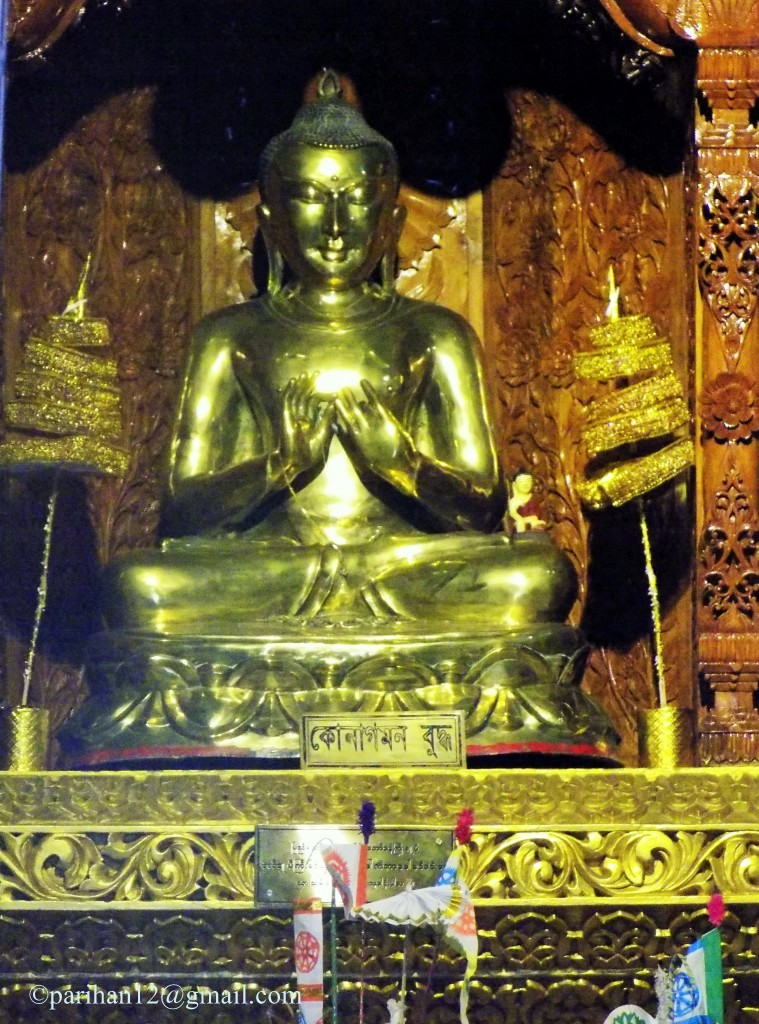
Statue of Koṇāgamana Buddha. Buddha Dhatu Jadi known as the Bandarban Golden Temple, Bangladesh

Buddhist titles
Preceded by Kakusandha Buddha	Seven Buddhas of the Past	Succeeded by Kassapa Buddha
