= Bhadrakalpika Sūtra =

Sutra in Mahāyāna Buddhism

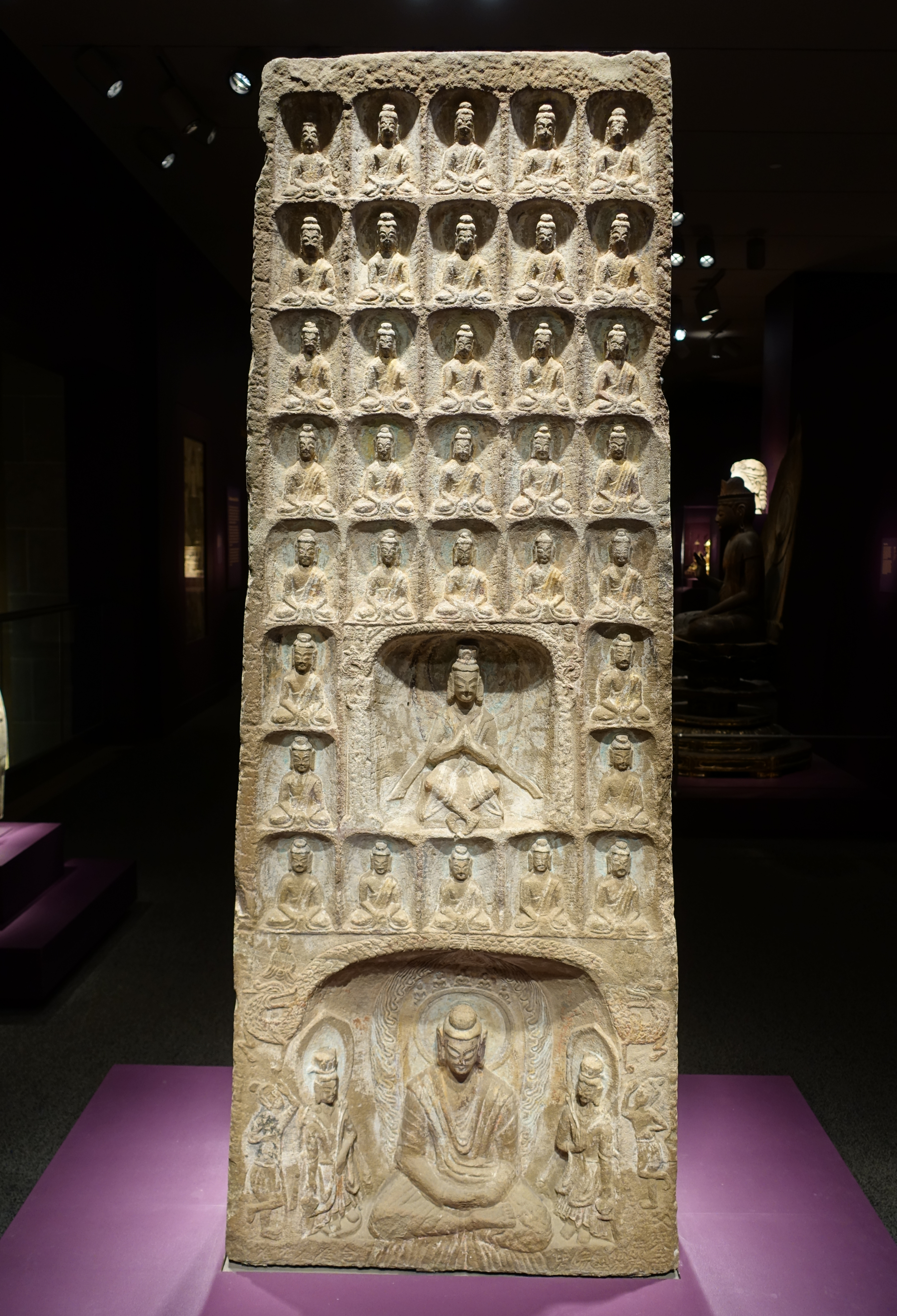
Buddhist stele with the Thousand Buddha motif, Northern Wei dynasty, 521 CE. The motif of a "thousand buddhas" (or 10,000) is a common one in Mahayana Buddhism.

The Bhadrakalpikasūtra (Full Sanskrit: Āryabhadrakalpikanāmamahāyānasūtra, Wylie: ’phags pa bskal pa bzang po zhes bya ba theg pa chen po’i mdo, lit. 'The Noble Great Vehicle Sūtra, The Good Eon') is a Mahāyāna sutra which discusses the names and deeds of over one thousand Buddhas of this "Fortunate Æon" (Bhadra kalpa). Most of the Buddhas in this sutra are future Buddhas, thus the sutra provides a future Buddhological long history of our world system.

The sutra contains 24 chapters and dates to around 200-250 CE. The sutra is the first sutra in the Kangyur's general sutra section and is one of the longest sutras translated into Tibetan. Other parallel versions of the sutra are available in Middle Chinese, Middle Mongol, and the Saka language in variants that differ slightly as to the number of Buddhas. For example, the Khotanese version has one thousand and five Buddhas.

In 2017, United States Representative Colleen Hanabusa was sworn in on an English-translated copy of the Sanskrit: Bhadrakalpikasūtra.

== History and background ==
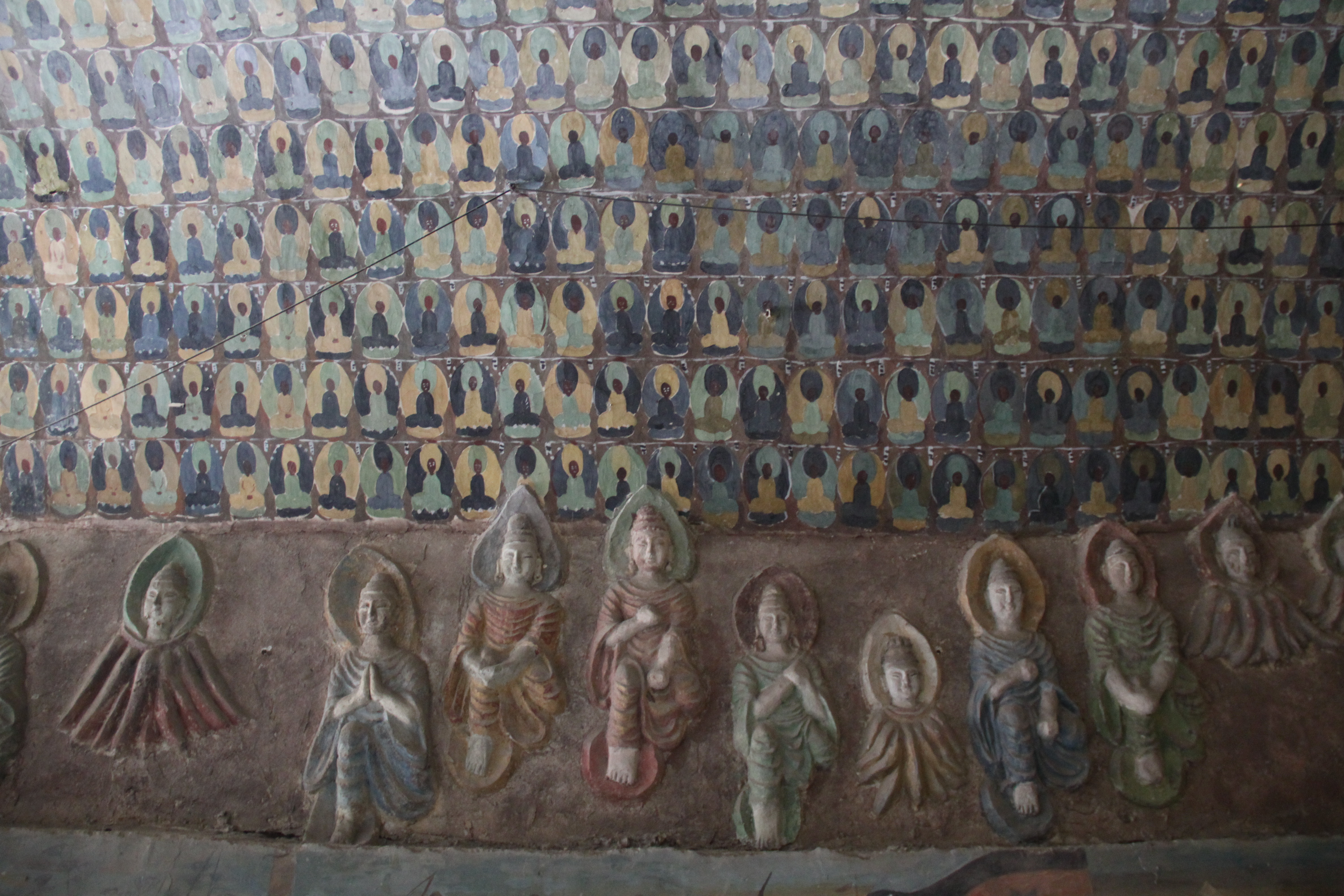
A wall of Buddhas at the Thousand Buddha Mountain (Chinese: 千佛山; Pinyin: Qiān Fó Shān), southeast of Jinan, the capital of Shandong.

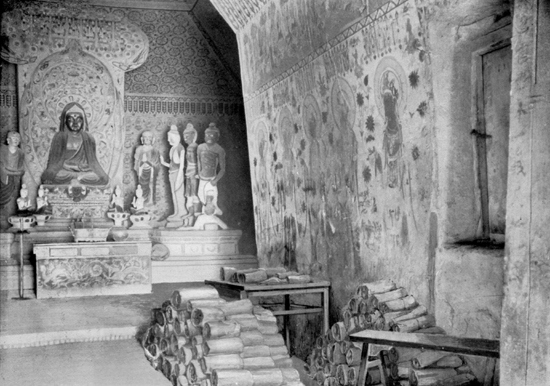
Photo showing Dunhuang Cave 16 and the manuscripts piled up for Aurel Stein near the entrance to Cave 17, the “library cave” at the Mogao Caves

The original Pali text is now lost, though fragments in Gandhari and Sanskrit do survive. One early Chinese translation of the Sanskrit: Bhadrakalpikasūtra was done by Dharmarakṣa, a native of Dunhuang, between third and fourth centuries. However, according to Peter Skilling, this version is incomplete. The popularity of the thousand-Buddha motif in the Dunhuang region is evidenced by the "Thousand-Buddha Cave", a world-renowned grotto at Dunhuang. Various lists of thousand Buddhas have also been found in Khotanese sources, verifying the importance of this narrative theme for the Buddhist Iranian Kingdom of Khotan. Ajanta Cave no. II also includes epigraphic evidence for the idea of the one thousand Buddhas.

The Indian Vidyākarasiṃha and the Tibetan Dpal-dbyans translated the text into Old Tibetan in the 8th century, during the early translation era.

The theme of the "good æon" (Sanskrit: bhadrakalpa, Pali: bhaddakappa) is found in earlier sources, such as the Mahāvadāna sūtra (Pali: DN 14, Mahāpadāna sutta) sutra, in which the Buddha states: "In this very Fortunate Æon, four truly and fully Awakened Ones arise in the world: Kakusandha, Kaṇakamuni, Kāśyapa, and myself, Śākyamuni, at present. This is the nature of things."

According to Skilling, the idea that one thousand Buddhas will arise in this good æon "circulated in the north and northwest of the Indian subcontinent by the beginning of the Christian era, if not earlier." The idea of one thousand Buddhas is also mentioned in the Mahāvastu. Various schools had different ideas about this. Some held that just five Buddhas will arise in this eon, others that five hundred Buddhas will arise, which seems to have been common in some Sarvāstivāda circles, and others held that one thousand Buddhas will arise. Numerous Mahayana sutras mention the idea of one thousand Buddhas in this good eon, including the Lotus Sutra, the Vimalakirti Sutra, and the Śūraṅgama Samādhi Sūtra.

== Overview ==
The Bhadrakalpikasūtra depicts the names and circumstances of the one thousand and four (1004) Buddhas of this current eon. The frame narrative states that sutra was taught by Shakyamuni Buddha in Vaiśālī on the request of Bodhisattva Prāmōdyarāja. In the frame narrative, the Buddha states that far in the past, a monarch (which was a past life of the Akṣobhya Buddha) helped a Dharma teacher who was the Amitābha Buddha. As a result of the good merit of this, the monarch and his thousand sons spend eighty eons serving over three billion (3,000,000,000) Buddhas.

The sutra then presents a long teaching by Shakyamuni Buddha on the six perfections. This long section on the six perfections contains around one hundred past life stories (jātakas, pūrvayōgas, avadānas) which illustrate the practice of the perfections.

After this teaching the Buddha proceeds to enumerate the names of all the 1004 Buddhas in this current eon in a set of verses. The list of thousand plus (the numbers varies in the different versions) Buddhas starts with Kakusandha, Kaṇakamuni, Kāśyapa, Śākyamuni, and Maitreya and ends with Rōcasiṃhākhya ("Rocha, the One Called Lion").

Following this enumeration is the most extensive part of the entire sutra, which contains extensive accounts of the details of each Buddha in mixed prose and verse. This includes their birthplaces, families, physical appearance, their sangha, chief disciples, lifespans, length of their teaching career and their relics.

The sutra then contains a third listing of the thousand plus Buddhas. This third enumeration (all in verse) explains the past life circumstances which lead each of the Buddhas to give rise to bodhicitta (the compassionate resolve aimed at awakening).

The sutra closes with a story about all the thousand Buddhas and how they were all sons of a king (who was a past life of Amitāyus) and with another story about a universal emperor (a previous life of the Dīpaṅkara Buddha).

== See also ==
- Mahayana sutras
- Heart Sutra
- Samantabhadra Meditation Sutra
