= Kassapa Buddha =

Ancient Buddha

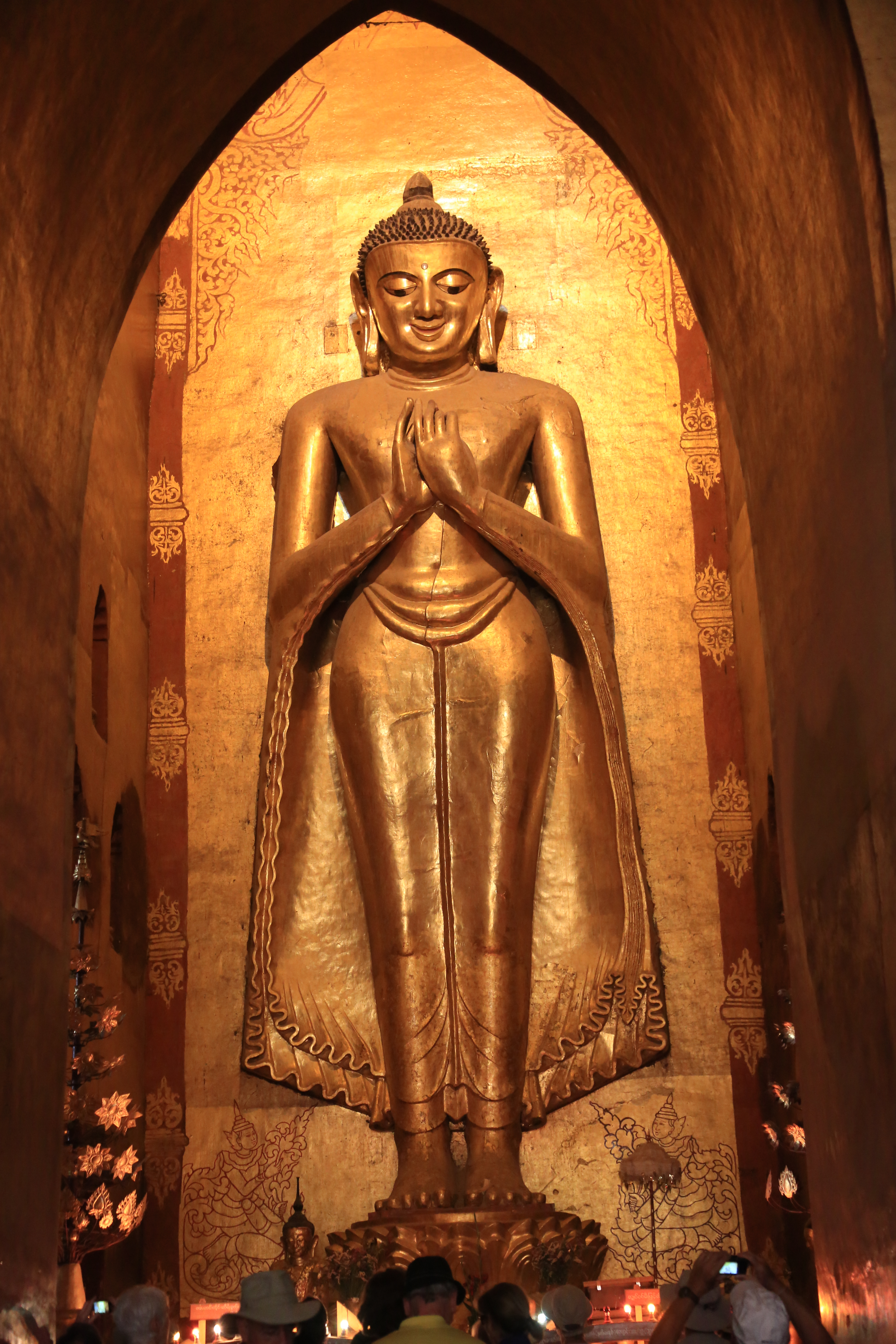
- South-facing Kassapa Buddha, Ananda Temple, Myanmar
- Sanskrit: काश्यप; Kāśyapa
- Pāli: कस्सप; Kassapa
- Burmese: ကဿပမြတ်စွာဘုရား ([kaʔθəpa̰])
- Chinese: 迦葉佛 (Pinyin: Jiāshè Fó)
- Japanese: 迦葉仏(かしょうぶつ) (romaji: Kashō Butsu)
- Khmer: ព្រះពុទ្ធកស្សបោ Preah Puth Kassapao
- Korean: 가섭불 (RR: Gaseop Bul)
- Mongolian: ᠭᠡᠷᠡᠯ ᠰᠠᠬᠢᠭᠴᠢ Гашив; Gashiv
- Sinhala: කාශ්‍යප බුදුන් වහන්සේ (kashyapa budun vahansē)
- Thai: พระกัสสปพุทธเจ้า; Phra Kassapa Phutthachao
- Tibetan: འོད་སྲུང་ Wylie: 'od srung THL: ösung
- Vietnamese: Phật Ca Diếp

Information
- Venerated by: Theravada, Mahayana, Vajrayana

Kassapa Buddha (Pali), is one of the ancient Buddhas that are chronicled in the Pali Canon's Buddhavamsa, Chapter 24. He was born in Deer Park at Sarnath, where he later delivered his first teaching. Kassapa Buddha was the previous Buddha of this kalpa before the present Gautama Buddha, though Kassapa lived long before him.

According to the Pali Canon's Theravāda Buddhist chronicle, Kassapa is the twenty-seventh of the twenty-nine named Buddhas, the sixth of the Seven Buddhas of Antiquity, and the third of the 1002 Buddhas of the present kalpa.

The present kalpa is called a mahabhadrakalpa, the "great auspicious aeon". The first five Buddhas of the present kalpa are:

1. Kakusandha Buddha, the first Buddha of the bhadrakalpa
2. Koṇāgamana Buddha, the second Buddha of the bhadrakalpa
3. Kassapa Buddha, the third Buddha of the bhadrakalpa
4. Gautama Buddha, the fourth and present Buddha of the bhadrakalpa
5. Maitreya, the fifth and future Buddha of the bhadrakalpa

== Life ==
Kassapa was born in Isipatana Deer Park, which is present day Deer Park at Sarnath, located near Varanasi. His parents were the Brahmins Brahmadatta and Dhanavatī.

According to the Chronicle, his body was twenty cubits high, and he lived for two thousand years in three different palaces. They are Hamsa, Yasa, and Sirinanda. (The BuA.217 calls the first two palaces Hamsavā and Yasavā). His wife was Sunanda, who bore him a son named Vijitasena.

Kassapa decided to give up his worldly life, and instantly his mansion flew up into the air with the people, as on a potter's wheel of lights, whose journey in the sky "captivated their hearts," The mansion landed on the ground, with a Bodhi Tree in its center. Here Kassapa took offered robes. His wife and her attendants, along with the men that accompanied Kassapa, exited the mansion and renounced their worldly lives. Thus, the mansion is the vehicle in which Kassapa Buddha renounced the world.

He practiced austerities for only seven days. Just before attaining enlightenment, he accepted a meal of milk-rice from Sunanda and grass for his seat from a yavapālaka named Soma. His Bodhi Tree, the tree under which he attained enlightenment, was a banyan, and he preached his first sermon at Isipatana Deer Park (in Sarnath) to an assembly of nuns and monks who had renounced the world in his company.

Kassapa performed The Twin Miracle at the foot of an asana tree outside Sundar Nagar. He travelled to the celestial realm of Tavatisma where he taught his mother in the Sudhamma assembly hall. He held only one assembly of his arhat disciples, and taught the dharma on five occasions. Among his most famous conversions was that of demon Nāradeva, a Yaksha.

His chief disciples among monks were Tissa and Bhāradvāja, and among nuns were Anulā Theri and Uruvelā Theri. His attendant was Sabbamitta. Among his chief patrons, the males were Sumangala and Ghattīkāra, and the females were Vijitasenā Upāsikā and Bhaddā Upāsikā.

Kassapa lived for sixteen thousand years, and passed in the city of Kashi, in the Kashi Kingdom, now known as Varanasi, in the modern-day Indian state of Uttar Pradesh. Over his relics was raised a stupa one league in height, each brick of which was worth one crore (ten million) rupees.

== The Stupa of Kassapa Buddha ==
In Kashi (Varanasi) where the Buddha Kassapa passed, a 1 yojana tall massive golden stupa was built to honour his place of passing and to house his relics. Initially, there was a great difference of opinion on what should be the size of the stupa and of what material it should be built. Construction of the stupa was begun after these issues were finally settled. But then the citizens found they lacked sufficient funds to complete the stupa. An anāgāmi devotee named Sorata travelled throughout the human world of Jambudvipa, requesting money from the people for the completion of the stupa. He sent the money as he received it, and on hearing that the work was completed, he set out to go and worship the stupa. He was said to be possibly seized by robbers and murdered in the forest, which later came to be known as the Andhavana.

The Great Jarung Kashor Stupa, that was built in the present day Boudhanath, Kathmandu, Nepal, is the renowned stupa constructed by a mother, known as Little Purna and as Samvari, and her four sons as a support for the dharmakaya mind of the Buddhas. Its original consecration enshrined the relics of the Buddha Kassapa. It was completed in seven years. At the consecration, the sons made aspirations to be reborn in Tibet in order to bring and propagate the Buddha's teachings within the northern lands. The sons were reborn as King Trisong Detsen, Khenpo Shantarakshita, Guru Padmasambhava, and the king's minister Nanam Dorje Dudjom. The Boudha Stupa was renovated in 2016 after the 2015 earthquake, and re-consecrated after the authentic relics of the Shakyamuni Buddha and Kassapa Buddha, together with other auspicious substances and offerings, were added to the reliquary.

At the Varanasi stupa, the Upavāna, in a previous birth, became the guardian deity of the stupa, hence his great majesty in his last life (DA.ii.580; for another source on the building of the shrine see DhA.iii.29).

Among the thirty-seven goddesses noticed by Guttila when he visited heaven was one who had offered a scented five-spray at the stupa (J.ii.256). Alāta offered āneja-flowers and obtained a happy rebirth (J.vi.227).

The cause of the Buddha's disciple Mahākāśyapa's golden complexion was his gift of a golden brick to the building of Kassapa's stupa (AA.i.116) in a previous life.

At the same stupa, Anuruddha, who was then a householder in Varanasi, offered butter and molasses in brass bowls, which were placed without any interval around the stupa (AA.i.105).

== See also ==
- Bhadrakalpikasutra

Buddhist titles
Preceded by Koṇāgamana Buddha	Seven Buddhas of the Past	Succeeded by Śākyamuni Buddha
