= Kakusandha =

One of the 28 ancient Buddhas

Kakusandha Buddha
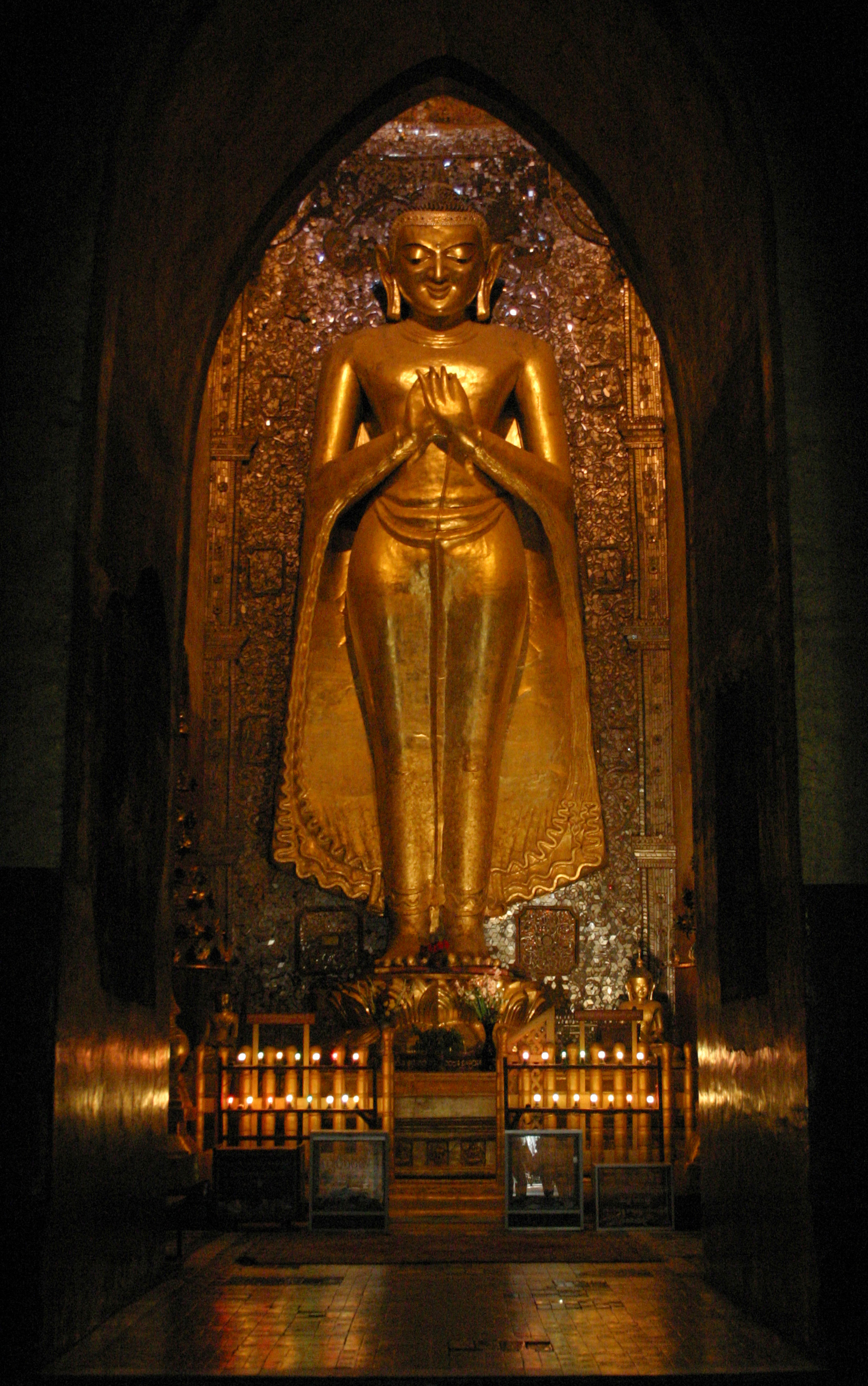
- North-facing Kakusandha Buddha, Ananda Temple, Myanmar
- Sanskrit: क्रकुच्छंद; Krakucchanda
- Pāli: Kakusandha
- Burmese: ကကုသန် ([ka̰kṵθàɰ̃])
- Chinese: 拘留孙佛 (Pinyin: Jūliúsūn Fó)
- Japanese: 拘留孫仏(くるそん ぶつ) (romaji: Kuruson Butsu)
- Khmer: ព្រះពុទ្ធកកុសន្ធោ Preah Puth Kakosantho
- Korean: 구류손불 (RR: Guryuson Bul)
- Mongolian: Кракучандра
- Sinhala: කකුසඳ බුදුරාජාණන් වහන්සේ Kakusandha budurajanan wahanse
- Thai: พระกกุสันธพุทธเจ้า; Phra Kakusantha Phutthachao
- Tibetan: Tibetan: འཁོར་བ་འཇིག་, Wylie: 'khor ba 'jig, THL: Khorwa jik
- Vietnamese: Phật Câu Lưu Tôn

Information
- Venerated by: Theravada, Mahayana, Vajrayana

Kakusandha (Pāli), or Krakucchanda in Sanskrit, is one of the ancient Buddhas whose biography is chronicled in chapter 22 of the Buddhavaṃsa, one of the books of the Pali Canon.

According to Theravāda Buddhism, Kakusandha is the twenty-fifth of the twenty-nine named Buddhas, the fourth of the Seven Buddhas of Antiquity, and the first of the five Buddhas of the present kalpa.

The present kalpa is called the bhadrakalpa "auspicious aeon". The five Buddhas of the present kalpa are:

1. Kakusandha
2. Koṇāgamana
3. Kassapa
4. Gautama
5. Maitreya

== Life ==
Kakusandha was born in Khemavati Park in Khemavati according to the Theravada tradition. Khemavati is now known as Gotihawa, and it is located about 4 kilometres (2.5 mi) southeast of Kapilvastu Municipality, in Kapilvastu District, in the Lumbini Zone of southern Nepal. His father was Aggidatta, a chaplain of the king Khemankara of Khemavati. His mother was Visakha. His wife was Virochamana (also known as Rocani); he had a son, Uttara (son of Kakusandha). Ashoka visited Gotihawa during his trip to Lumbini, Nepal, and installed a stone pillar, inscribing his visit on it. There is also a stupa in Gothihawa. Therefore, it is generally accepted that the stupa is associated with the nirvana of Kakusandha Buddha.

Kakusandha lived for four thousand years in the household in three palaces: Ruci, Suruci and Vaddhana (or Rativaddhana). At the age of four thousand, he renounced worldly life while riding on a chariot. He practised austerities for eight months. Before attaining enlightenment, he had accepted some milk-rice from the daughter of the Brahmin Vajirindha of the village Suchirindha, as well as grass for his seat from the yavapalaka Subhadda. He attained enlightenment under a sirisa tree, then delivered his first sermon to the assembly of eighty-four thousand monks in a park near Makila.

Kakusandha performed the twin miracle under a sala tree, at the gates of Kannakujja. Among his converts was a fierce yaksha named Naradeva. Kakusandha kept the fast-day (uposatha) every year.

His chief disciples were Vidhura and Sanjiva among the monks, and Sama and Champa among the nuns. His personal attendant was Buddhija. Acchuta and Samana among the men, and Nanda and Sunanda among the women were his chief lay-supporters. Acchuta built a monastery for Kakusandha Buddha on the same site, which was later chosen by Anathapindika for the jetavanaramaya for the Buddha.

According to the Saṃyutta Nikāya (ii.194), the Vepulla peak of Rajgir was then called Pachinvamsa and the people of the region Tivara.

Kakusandha's body was forty cubits in height, and he died at the age of forty thousand years in Khemavati. The stupa erected over his relics was one league high.

The bodhisattva who was to become the Buddha was born as King Khema during the time of Kakusandha. Kakusandha was the Buddha who foretold that King Khema, who offered him alms with robes and medicines, would become the Gautama Buddha in the future.

== See also ==
- Bhadrakalpika Sūtra

Buddhist titles
Preceded by Vessabhū Buddha	Seven Buddhas of the Past	Succeeded by Koṇāgamana Buddha
