= Vessabhū =

One of the 28 ancient Buddhas

Viśvabhū Buddha
- Sanskrit: विश्वभू Viśvabhū
- Pāli: Vessabhū
- Burmese: ဝေဿဘူဘုရား
- Chinese: 毗舍婆佛 (Pinyin: Píshèpó Fó)
- Japanese: 毘舎浮仏(びしゃふぶつ) (romaji: Bishafu Butsu)
- Korean: 비사부불 (RR: Bisabu Bul)
- Sinhala: වෙස්සභු Wessabhu
- Thai: พระเวสสภูพุทธเจ้า; Phra Wetsaphu Phutthachao
- Tibetan: ཐམས་ཅད་སྐྱོབ་ Wylie: thams cad skyob
- Vietnamese: Phật Tỳ Xá Phù

Information
- Venerated by: Theravada, Mahayana, Vajrayana

According to the Buddhavaṃsa, Vessabhū is believed to be the 24th Buddha. He was born in the pleasance of Anoma (Commentary, Anūpama), his father being the khattiya Suppatita (Supatita) and his mother Yasavatī.* He is venerated by the Theravada, Mahayana, Vajrayana traditions.

== Life ==
He is believed to have lived for six thousand years as a householder in three palaces: Ruci, Suruci and Vaddhana (Rativaddhana); his wife was Sucittā, and their son Suppabuddha. He left home in a golden palanquin, practiced austerities for six months, was given kheera (a milk-rice pudding) by Sirivaddhanā of Sucittanigama, and grass for his seat by the Nāga king Narinda, and attained Enlightenment under a sāla tree. He preached his first sermon at Anurārāma to his brothers, Sona and Uttara, who became his chief disciples.

== See also ==
- List of the twenty-nine Buddhas

Buddhist titles
Preceded by Sikhī Buddha	Seven Buddhas of the Past	Succeeded by Kakusandha Buddha
