= Sikhī Buddha =

One of the 28 ancient Buddhas

Śikhin Buddha
- Sanskrit: शिखिन् Śikhin Buddha
- Pāli: Sikhī Buddha
- Burmese: သိခီဘုရား
- Chinese: 尸棄佛 (Pinyin: Shīqì Fó)
- Japanese: 尸棄仏(しきぶつ) (romaji: Shiki Butsu)
- Korean: 시기불 (RR: Sigi Bul)
- Sinhala: සිඛී බුදුන් වහන්සේ Sikhi Budun Wahanse
- Thai: พระสิขีพุทธเจ้า; Phra Sikhi Phutthachao
- Tibetan: གཙུག་ཏོར་ཅན་ Wylie: gtsug tor can THL: tsuktor chen
- Vietnamese: Thi Khí Phật

Information
- Venerated by: Theravada, Mahayana, Vajrayana
- Attributes: Buddha of Knowledge

According to the Buddhavaṃsa and Buddhist mythology, Sikhī (Pāli), is the twenty-third of twenty-eight Buddhas. The penultimate Buddha of the Alamkarakalpa (Adorned Eon), Sikhī was preceded by Vipassī Buddha and succeeded by Vessabhū Buddha.

== Etymology ==
He was called Sikhī because his unhisa (turban) looked like a sikha (flame).

== Biography ==
According to the Buddhavamsa as well as traditional Buddhist legend, Sikhī lived 31 kalpas — many billions of years — before the present time. He was born in Aruṇavatī, which is located in the Dhule district of Maharashtra, in present-day India. His family was of the Kshatriya varna, which constituted the ruling and military elite of the Vedic period. His father was Aruṇa the warrior-chief, and his mother was Pabhāvatī. His wife was Sabbakama, and he had a son named Atula.

Sikhī lived in the palaces of Sucanda, Giri and Vāhana for 7,000 Days (7,000 years according to the legends) until he renounced his worldly life, riding out of the palace on an elephant. He practiced asceticism for eight months before attaining enlightenment under a pundarika tree. Just prior to achieving buddhahood, he accepted a bowl of milk rice from the daughter of Piyadassī (a sethi from the town of Sudassana Nigama), and sat on a grass seat prepared by Anomadassi, an Ājīvika ascetic.

Sources differ as to how long Sikhī lived. He was reported to have died in Dussarama (or Assarama), somewhere near the Silavati River, at the age of either 37,000 or 70,000 Days.

== Physical characteristics ==
Sikhī was 37 cubits tall, which is roughly equal to 56 feet (17 m). His body radiated light for a distance of three leagues, which is roughly equal to 9 miles (14 km).

== Teachings ==
Sikhī preached his first sermon in Migachira Park to 100,000 disciples, his second sermon to 80,000 disciples, and his third sermon to 70,000 disciples.

He demonstrated his twin miracle at a place near Suriyavati under a champaka tree. Abhibhu and Sambhava were his chief monk disciples; and Akhila (or Makhila) and Paduma were his principal female disciples. His chief attendant was Khemankara. Sirivaddha and Chanda (or Nanda) were his chief male patrons; and Chitta and Sugutta were the chief among the women.

== See also ==
- Buddhist cosmology
- Glossary of Buddhism
- Longevity myths

== Notes ==
Buddhist titles
| Preceded by Vipassī Buddha | Seven Buddhas of the Past | Succeeded by Vessabhū Buddha |
