= Vipassī =

One of the 28 ancient Buddhas

Vipassī Buddha
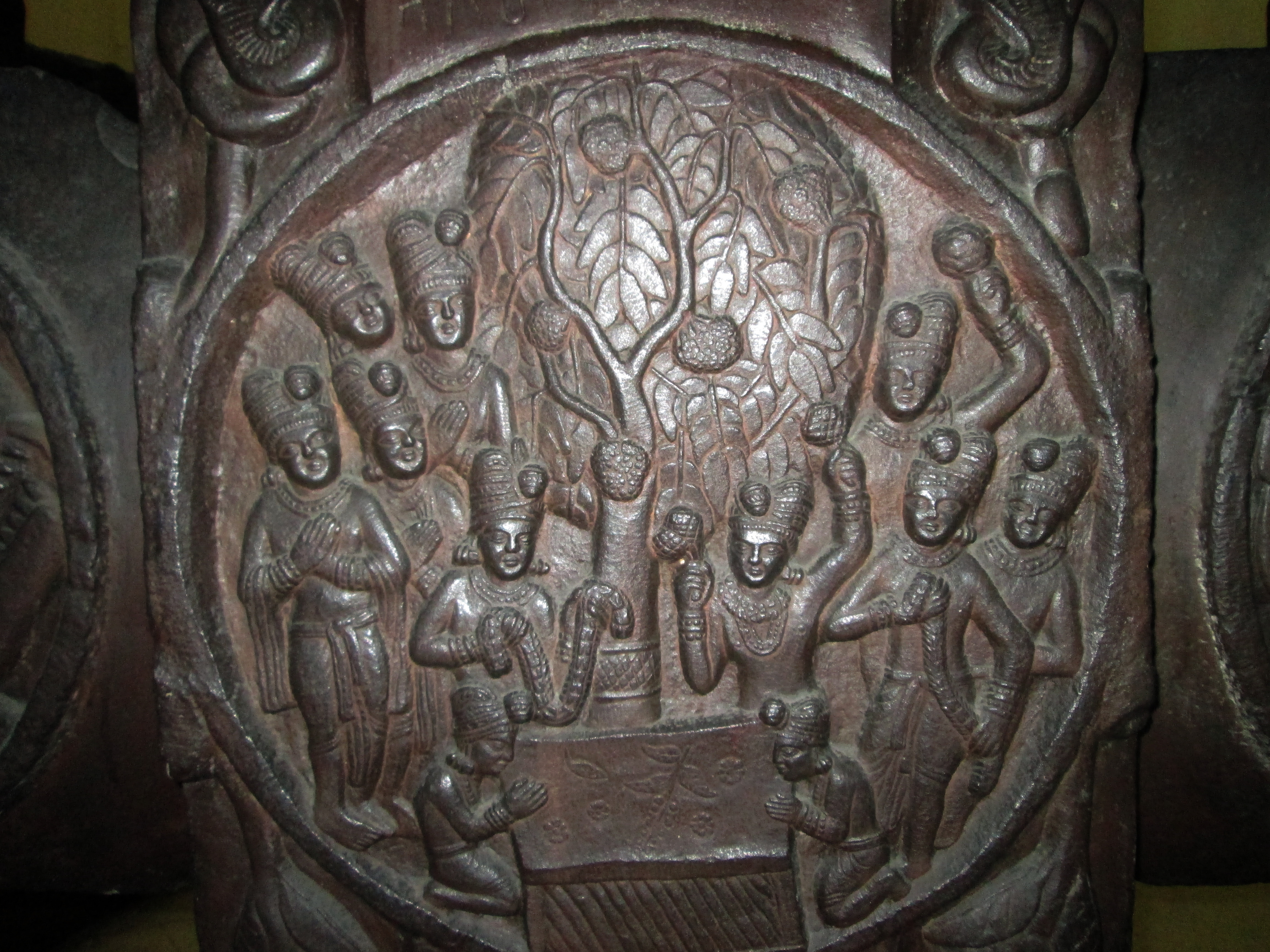
- Vipassī and pāṭalī tree from the Bharhut Stupa at the Indian Museum, Kolkata.
- Sanskrit: विपश्यिन् Vipaśyin Buddha
- Pāli: Vipassī Buddha
- Burmese: ဝိပဿီဘုရား
- Chinese: 毗婆尸佛 (Pinyin: Pípóshī Fó)
- Japanese: 毘婆尸仏(びばしぶつ) (romaji: Bibashi Butsu)
- Korean: 비파시불 (RR: Bipasi Bul)
- Sinhala: විපස්සී බුදුන් වහන්සේ Wipassi Budun Wahanse
- Thai: พระวิปัสสีพุทธเจ้า; Phra Wipatsi Phutthachao
- Tibetan: རྣམ་གཟིགས་ Wylie: rnam gzigs
- Vietnamese: Phật Tỳ Bà Thi

Information
- Venerated by: Theravada, Mahayana, Vajrayana
- Attributes: Pure Buddha

In Buddhist tradition, Vipassī (Pāli) is the twenty-second of twenty-eight Buddhas described in Chapter 27 of the Buddhavaṃsa. The Buddhavamsa is a Buddhist text which describes the life of Gautama Buddha and the twenty-seven Buddhas who preceded him. It is the fourteenth book of the Khuddaka Nikāya, which in turn is part of the Sutta Piṭaka. The Sutta Piṭaka is one of three pitakas (main sections) which together constitute the Tripiṭaka, or Pāli Canon of Theravada Buddhism.

The third to the last Buddha of the Alamkarakalpa, Vipassī was preceded by Phussa Buddha and succeeded by Sikhī Buddha.

== Etymology ==
The Pali word Vipassī has the Sanskrit form Vipaśyin. Vi (good) and passī (saw) together mean "having seen clearly". The word belongs to the same family as the term vipassanā (contemplation). The Buddha was so named because he discovered the path to observe things as they are, without judgement. He discovered a way for mankind to be in the present moment through observing, breathing, and sensing consciously in the self without judgements. This introspection automatically develops insight into one's self, which helps to see things clearly as they are, not as we think or imagine them to be, and helps untie the knot perpetually complicated circumstances.

== Biography ==
According to the Buddhavamsa, as well as traditional Buddhist legend and mythology, Vipassī lived 91 kalpas — many billions of years — before the present time. In Vipassī's time, the longevity of humans was 84,000 years.

Vipassī was born in Bandhumatī in Khema Park, in present-day India.His father was Bandhumā the warrior-chief, and his mother was Bandhumatī. His wife was Sutanu, and he had a son named Samavattakkhandha.

Vipassī lived as a householder for 8,000 years in the palaces of Nanda, Sunanda and Sirimā. Upon renouncing his worldly life, he rode out of the palace in a chariot. Vipassī practiced asceticism for eight months before attaining enlightenment under a pāṭalī tree (Stereospermum chelonoides) (see Bodhi_tree and). Just prior to achieving buddhahood, he accepted a bowl of milk rice offered by Sudassana-setthi's daughter, and grass for his seat by a guard named Sujâta.

Sources differ as to how long Vipassī lived. He was reported to have died in Sumitta Park, at the age of either 80,000 or 100,000 years. His relics were kept in a stupa which was seven yojanas in height, which is roughly equal to 56 miles (90 km).

== Physical characteristics ==
Vipassī was 80 cubits tall, which is roughly equal to 121 feet (37 m), and his body radiated light for a distance of seven yojanas.

== Teachings ==
Vipassī preached his first sermon in the Khamamigadâya to 6,800,000 disciples, his second sermon to 100,000 disciples, and his third sermon to 80,000 disciples.

His two foremost male disciples were Khanda and Tissa and his two foremost female disciples were Candâ and Candamittâ. Asoka was his personal assistant. His good donors were Punabbasummitta and Naga in the lay men, Sirimâ and Uttarâ in the lay women. Mendaki (then called Avaroja) built the Gandhakuti (scented pavilion) for him. He did the uposatha once every seven years, and the sangha observed the discipline perfectly.

== See also ==
- Buddhist cosmology
- Glossary of Buddhism
- Longevity myths

== Notes ==
Buddhist titles
| Preceded by Phussa Buddha | Seven Buddhas of the Past | Succeeded by Sikhī Buddha |
