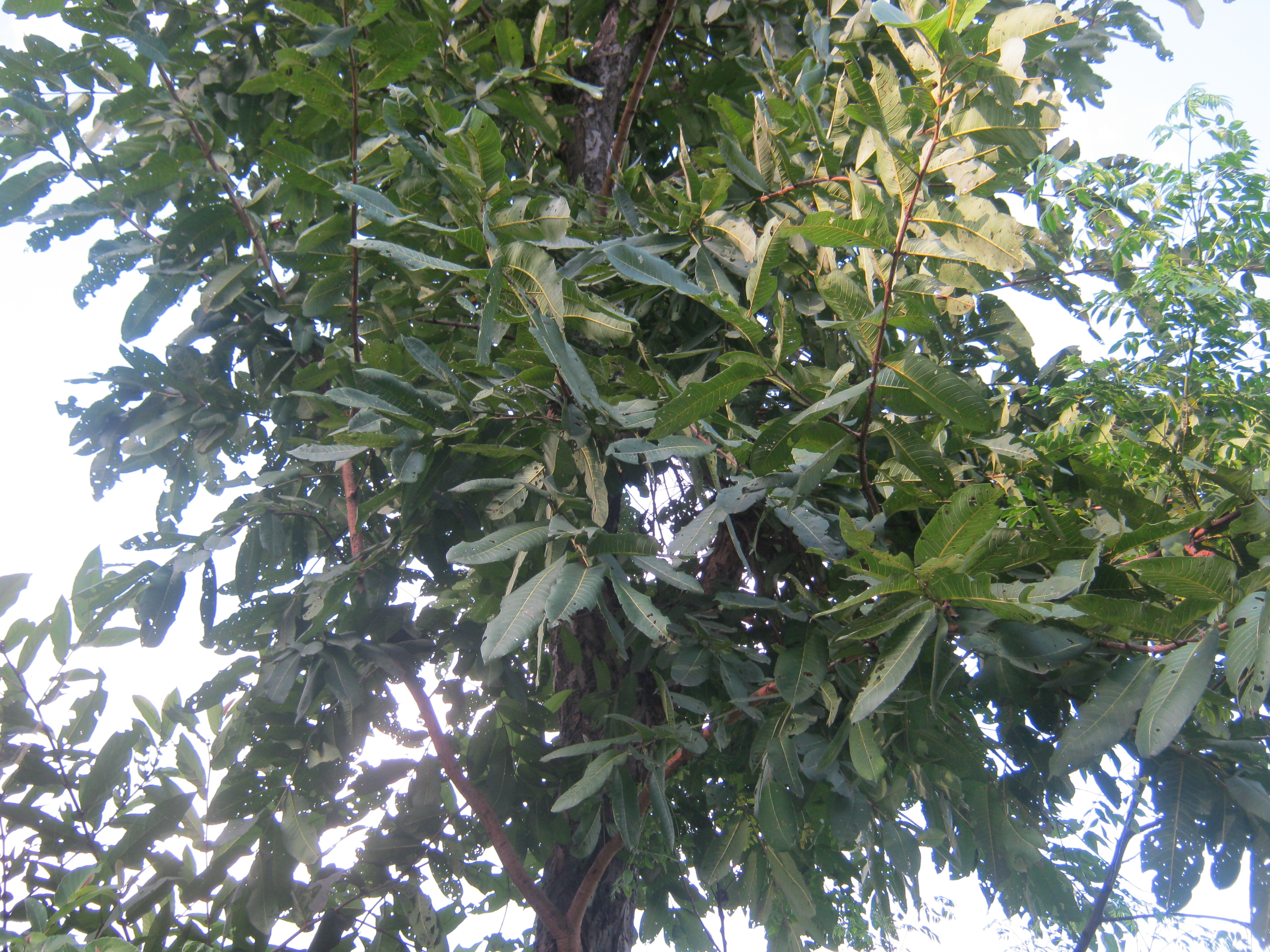

Scientific classification
- Kingdom: Plantae
- Clade: Tracheophytes
- Clade: Angiosperms
- Clade: Eudicots
- Clade: Rosids
- Order: Myrtales
- Family: Combretaceae
- Genus: Terminalia
- Species: T. elliptica

Binomial name
- Terminalia elliptica Willd.

Synonyms
- List: Pentaptera coriacea Roxb.; Pentaptera crenulata (Roth) DC.; Pentaptera cuneata DC.; Pentaptera macrocarpa Wall.; Pentaptera maradu G.Don; Pentaptera tomentosa Roxb. ex DC.; Terminalia alata Roth; Terminalia arjuna var. angustifolia C.B.Clarke; Terminalia coriacea (Roxb.) Wight & Arn.; Terminalia coriacea Spreng.; Terminalia crenulata Roth; Terminalia macrocarpa Steud. ex Kurz; Terminalia ovata Rottler ex C.B.Clarke; Terminalia ovata var. angustifolia (Clarke) S.Yadav & M.R.Almeida; Terminalia tomentosa Wight & Arn.

= Terminalia elliptica =

Species of Terminalia

Terminalia elliptica (sin. Terminalia tormentosa) is a species of Terminalia native to southern and southeast Asia in India, Nepal, Bangladesh, Myanmar, Thailand, Laos, Cambodia, and Vietnam. It is a prominent part of both dry and moist deciduous forests in southern India up to 1,000 metres (3,300 feet).

Common names are asna; saj or saaj; Indian laurel; marutham (Tamil); matti (Kannada); ain (Marathi); taukkyan (Burma); sadar, matti or marda (India); asana (Sri Lanka); and casually crocodile bark due to the characteristic bark pattern.

It is a tree growing to 30 m (98 ft) tall, with a trunk diameter of 1 m. The fruit is ovoid, 3 cm (1.2 in) long, with five wings not extending beyond the fruit apex. The bark is fire-resistant. The wood is coarse, fairly straight grained, dull to somewhat lustrous and without any smell or taste. The hardwood varies from light brown with few markings to dark brown or brownish black and figured with darker streaks. The sapwood is reddish white and sharply differentiated. The heartwood is moderately durable and the sapwood is liable to powder-post beetle attack.

Terminalia tomentosa has a remarkable attribute: some members of the species store water in the dry season. A survey conducted at Bandipur National Park, India showed that a proportion of trees store water and there is a girth dependent increase in the frequency and amount of water storage. The mechanism and ecophysiological significance of this water storage is not known.

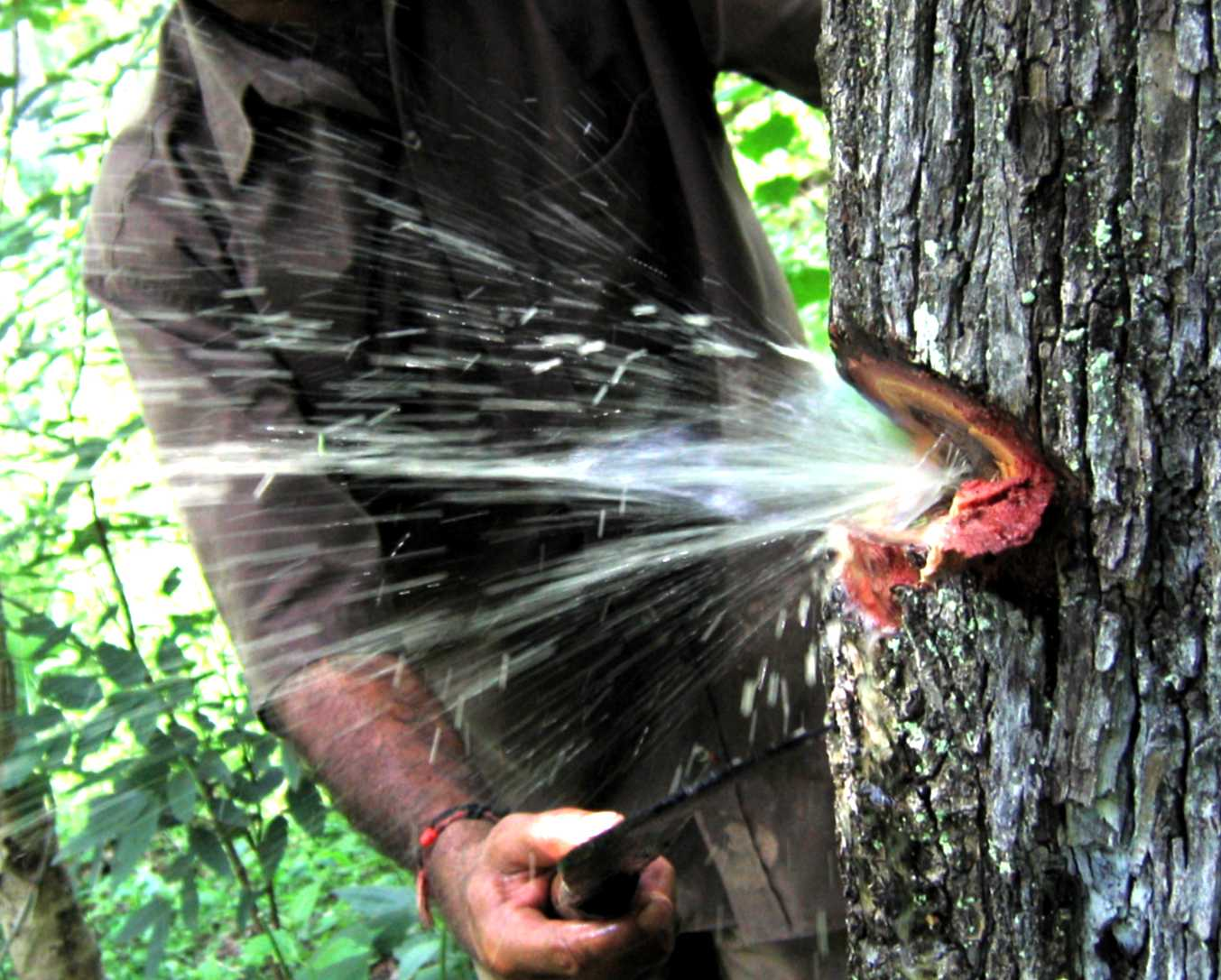
Water storage in T. elliptica

== Uses ==
The wood is used for furniture, cabinetwork, joinery, paneling, specialty items, boat-building, railroad cross-ties (treated), decorative veneers and for musical instruments (e.g. for guitar fretboard).

The leaves are used as food by Antheraea paphia (silkworms) which produce the tassar silk (Tussah), a form of commercially important wild silk. The bark is used medicinally against diarrhoea. Oxalic acid can be extracted from it. The bark and especially the fruit yield pyrogallol and catechol to dye and tan leather.

Water stored in the stem is often tapped and used as a source of potable water in the summer by forest folk. It is also thought to have curative value for stomach pain.

Outside of its native range, it is cultivated in southern China.

== In culture ==
In Theravada Buddhism, a tree of this kind is said to have been used as the tree for achieving enlightenment (Bodhi) by the twentieth Tissa Buddha. (Other text books identify the Azadirachta indica as the Bodhi tree of Tissa Buddha.)

== See also ==
- List of Indian timber trees
