= Sumedha Buddha =

Fourteenth of twenty-seven Buddhas

- Sanskrit: सुमेध; Sumedha
- Pāli: Sumedha
- Burmese: သုမေဓဘုရား
- Chinese: 善慧佛 (Pinyin: Shànhuì Fó)
- Korean: 선혜불 (RR: Seonhye Bul)
- Sinhala: සුමේධ බුදුන් වහන්සේ Sumedha Budun Wahanse
- Thai: พระสุชาตพุทธเจ้า; Phra Sumetha Phutthachao
- Vietnamese: Thiện Huệ Phật

Information
- Venerated by: Theravada, Mahayana, Vajrayana

According to Theravada Buddhism's Pali canon's Buddhavamsa and commentary, Sumedha Buddha is the fourteenth of twenty-seven Buddhas who preceded the historical Gautama Buddha. Sumedha Buddha was born in Sudassana. According to the canon, at 9,000 years old he became an ascetic, practiced austerities for fifteen days, and attained Enlightenment. He lived 90,000 years, and died in Medhārāma.

The Buddhavamsa describes Sumedha Buddha in this fashion:

Sumedha, hard to attack, of intense incandescence, supreme sage in all the world. He was clear-eyed, full-mouthed, of tall stature, upright, majestic. He sought the welfare of all beings and released many from bondage.

During Sumedha Buddha's lifetime, the one destined to become Gautama Buddha was known as the Brahmin Uttara who, upon entering ascetic life, made an offering to Sumedha Buddha and his Order of 80 crores of wealth.

== Sumedha as a previous life of Gotama Buddha ==
The name Sumedha is found elsewhere in early Buddhist canons in the stories of other Buddhas. Most notably, in the Pali Canon's Buddhavamsa, during the dispensation of the first of twenty-five buddhas, Dipankara Buddha, the historical Gotama Buddha was living as a Brahmin-then-ascetic named "Sumedha."
