= Buddhist mythology =

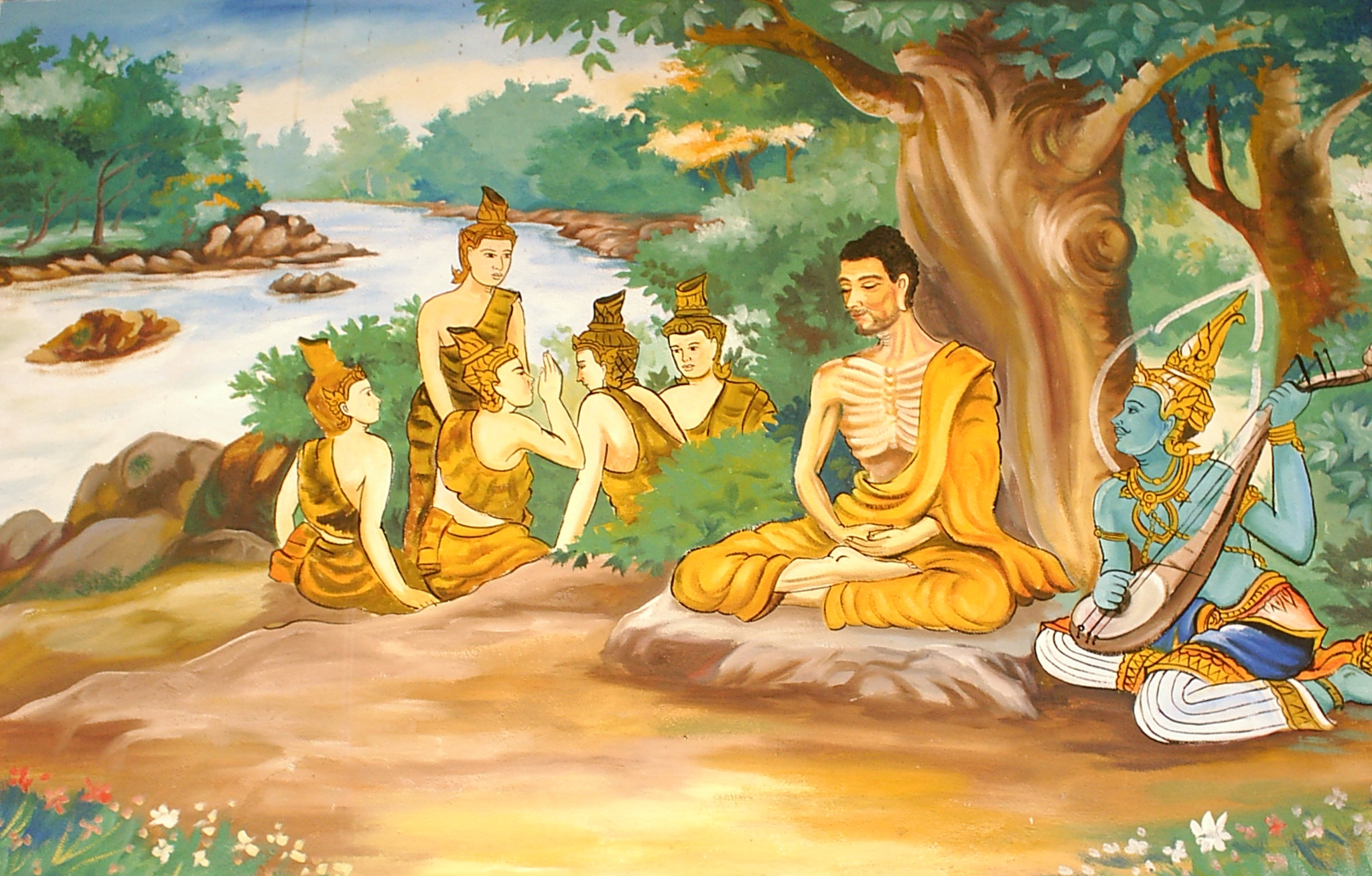
A wallpainting in a Laotian temple, depicting the Bodhisattva Gautama (Buddha-to-be) undertaking extreme ascetic practices before his enlightenment. A god is overseeing his striving, and providing some spiritual protection.

The Buddhist traditions have created and maintained a vast body of mythological literature. The central myth of Buddhism revolves around the purported events of the life of the Buddha. This is told in relatively realistic terms in the earliest texts, and was soon elaborated into a complex literary mythology. The chief motif of this story, and the most distinctive feature of Buddhist myth, is the Buddha's renunciation: leaving his home and family for a spiritual quest. Alongside this central myth, the traditions contain large numbers of smaller stories, which are usually supposed to convey an ethical or Buddhist teaching. These include the popular Jātakas, folk tales or legends believed to be past lives of Gautama Buddha. Since these are regarded as episodes in the life of the Buddha, they are treated here as “myth”, rather than distinguishing between myth, legend, and folk-tale.

Buddhist mythology is maintained in texts, but these have always existed alongside oral traditions of storytelling, as well as creative retellings of myths as drama or artworks. This creative mythology continues to this day, and includes film, television, and musical adaptions of Buddhist myths.

Myth has always been an important part of the way Buddhists see themselves and form communities. Attitudes to myths vary, with some people seeing the stories as entirely factual, while others see them as symbolic. In this article, as in scholarly study of mythology generally, the use of the term “myth” does not imply a value or truth judgement. Rather, it refers to the study of sacred stories and their meaning within a community. Many scholars have long recognized that Buddhism contains one of the world's great mythologies.

== Myth of the Buddha's life ==
=== In early texts ===
Mythology in Buddhism is used at various intellectual levels in order to give symbolic and sometimes quasi-historical expression to religious teachings. As noted by scholars such as Thomas Rhys Davids, the earliest texts of Buddhism (such as the Nikāyas and Āgamas) do not present a single coherent and systematic biography of the Buddha. However, there are various references to numerous life events in these texts, and in a few cases gives more extensive accounts of important events in the Buddha's life. All later versions of the Buddha's life derive primarily from these sources. These include:

- Gautama's birth.
- Some details of his life growing up.
- References to the renunciation. The famous story of the “four signs” is told, but regarding the past Buddha Vipassī, not Gautama.
- Detailed accounts of Gautama's practices before awakening. These include his encounter with earlier teachers, the period of austerities, and his own efforts to develop meditation.
- Various accounts of the night of the Awakening.
- The events following awakening are told in a famous narrative that is found either in Sutta or Vinaya.
- Events involving the Buddha's family, including his return home and the ordination of his son, the rebellion of Devadatta, ordination of the Buddha's step-mother as the first bhikkhuni, found mostly in the Vinayas.
- The Buddha's last journey, passing away, and subsequent events are told in the Mahāparinibbāna Sutta.

Most of the relevant texts from the Pali canon have been gathered and arranged in Bhikkhu Ñāṇamoli's The Life of the Buddha. Bhikkhu Sujato has shown that the events of the Buddha's life in the early texts fulfill almost all the stages of Campbell's Hero's Journey, despite the fact that they are not arranged as a coherent narrative. The Hero's Journey becomes much more prominent and complete in later versions of the story.

The early texts also include references to Indian deities (devas), extraordinary beings such as Yakkhas, Nagas and other mythic content.

=== The extended life of the Buddha in Jātakas ===
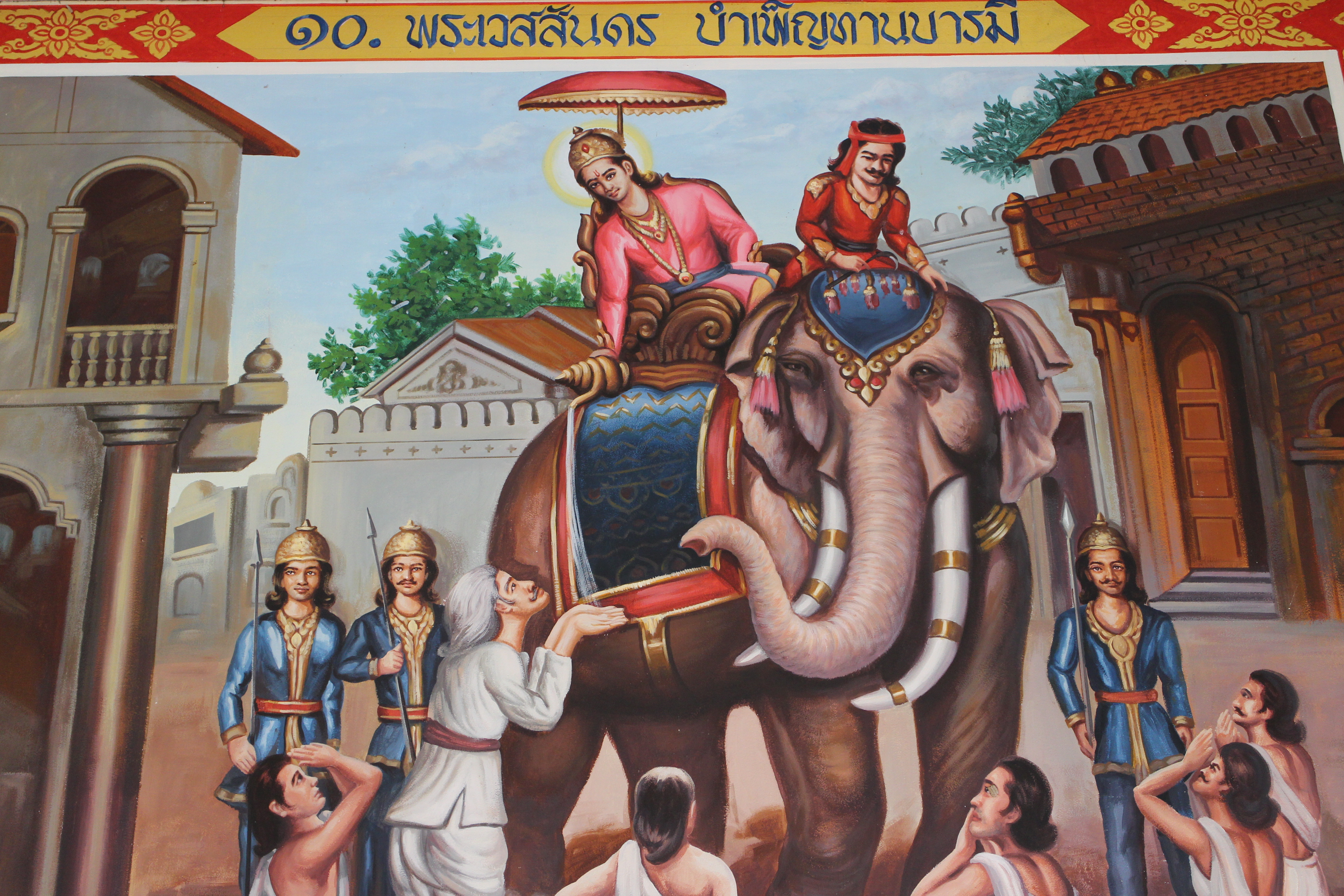
Vessantara gives alms, from one of the most famous Jatakas, the Vessantara Jataka

One of the “three knowledges” (tevijjā) of the Buddha was recollecting past lives. However, early texts contain very few actual narratives of past lives. Such stories as are found in the early texts almost always show signs of belonging to the latest strata of those texts. However, in a short time the Buddhist community developed a vast repertoire of stories associated with the Buddha's past lives, known as the Jātakas. There are 550 such stories in the Pali canon, and hundreds more in Chinese, Tibetan, and Sanskrit sources. Several Jātakas are depicted in visual form on the monuments at Sanchi, dating around the 1st century BCE. The corpus of Jātaka stories continued to grow over the centuries. Some of the most popular continue to be the Mahanipata Jataka which depict the final ten lives of the Buddha before his last birth.

The Jātakas appear to be mostly derived from vernacular Indian folk tales, fables and legends in mixed prose and verse. Like the lives of the Buddha, they are not sectarian, as many Jātakas are shared among traditions. Some of the stories are related to Brahmanical legends, such as those found in the Rāmayaṇa and Mahābharata, while others show similarities to Aesop's fables and other world literature. While most of the Jātakas contain a “moral”, in most cases these pertain to simple and universal ideas, such as non-violence or honesty, and only a few of the stories feature distinctively Buddhist ideas. A typical Jātaka tale features a conflict or challenge, which the hero overcomes through his courage, intelligence, or other virtues. The hero of the story is identified with the Buddha, while other characters in the story are often identified with familiar associates of the Buddha, such as his close disciples, family, or Devadatta as the antagonist.

Since the Jātakas are in essence the preliminary chapters of the Buddha's spiritual development, they are sometimes included together with the Buddha's life. In the Pali sources, for example, the life of the Buddha is featured as the opening framing narrative of the Jātaka collection.

There is a similar class of literature known as Apadāna. Originally the term seems to have simply meant a tale of the past, as the Mahāpadāna Sutta of the Dīgha Nikāya tells the story of a Buddha in a past age. However it came to refer to a class of stories about the past lives of the Buddha's monk and nun disciples. These often depict how enlightened disciples of the Buddha achieved that status by making offerings to a Buddha in a past life.

=== In Vinaya texts ===
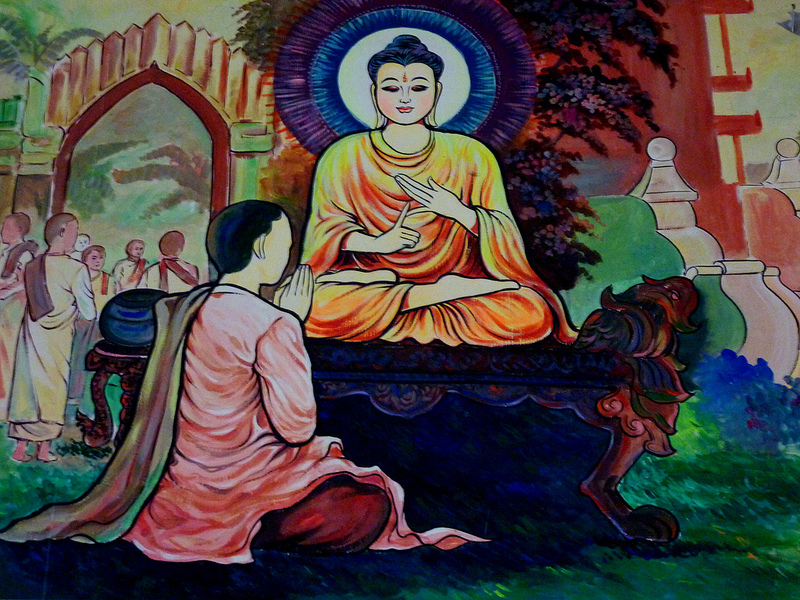
Mahapajapati, first Buddhist nun and Buddha's stepmother ordains

The doctrinal texts (suttas) of the early period contain little narrative and less myth. However, in the texts on monastic discipline (Vinaya), each rule or procedure must be preceded by an origin story. These are frequently simple narratives that merely give a context for the rule. However, in several cases the narrative is developed and includes significant mythic motifs. Most of these occur in relation to important events in the Buddha's life, especially those involving his family. But they also occur independently.

Erich Frauwallner argued that the portion of Vinaya known as the Khandhakas was formed around one of the earliest versions of the Buddha's life story. Later Vinaya texts such as the Mūlasarvāstivāda Vinaya and the Mahāvastu added even more mythic material while some texts also arose out of this material becoming detached from the Vinaya and beginning to circulate as independent biographies of the Buddha.

Some of the myths told in the Vinayas include:

- The Buddha's awakening.
- The period after the Buddha's awakening such as the 'first sermon' (this corresponds to the “return” portion of Campbell's hero cycle)
- The ordination of the Buddha's stepmother Mahāpajāpatī. This episode is particularly rich in mythic imagery and meaning.
- The rebellion of Devadatta. (betrayal by a close relative is familiar in the myths of, for example, Jesus, Balder, and Osiris.)
- The medical training of the doctor Jīvaka.
- The story of Prince Dīghāvu.
- Multiple original stories for Vinaya rules include mythic motifs, for example the stupa rule.

=== In post-Ashokan texts ===
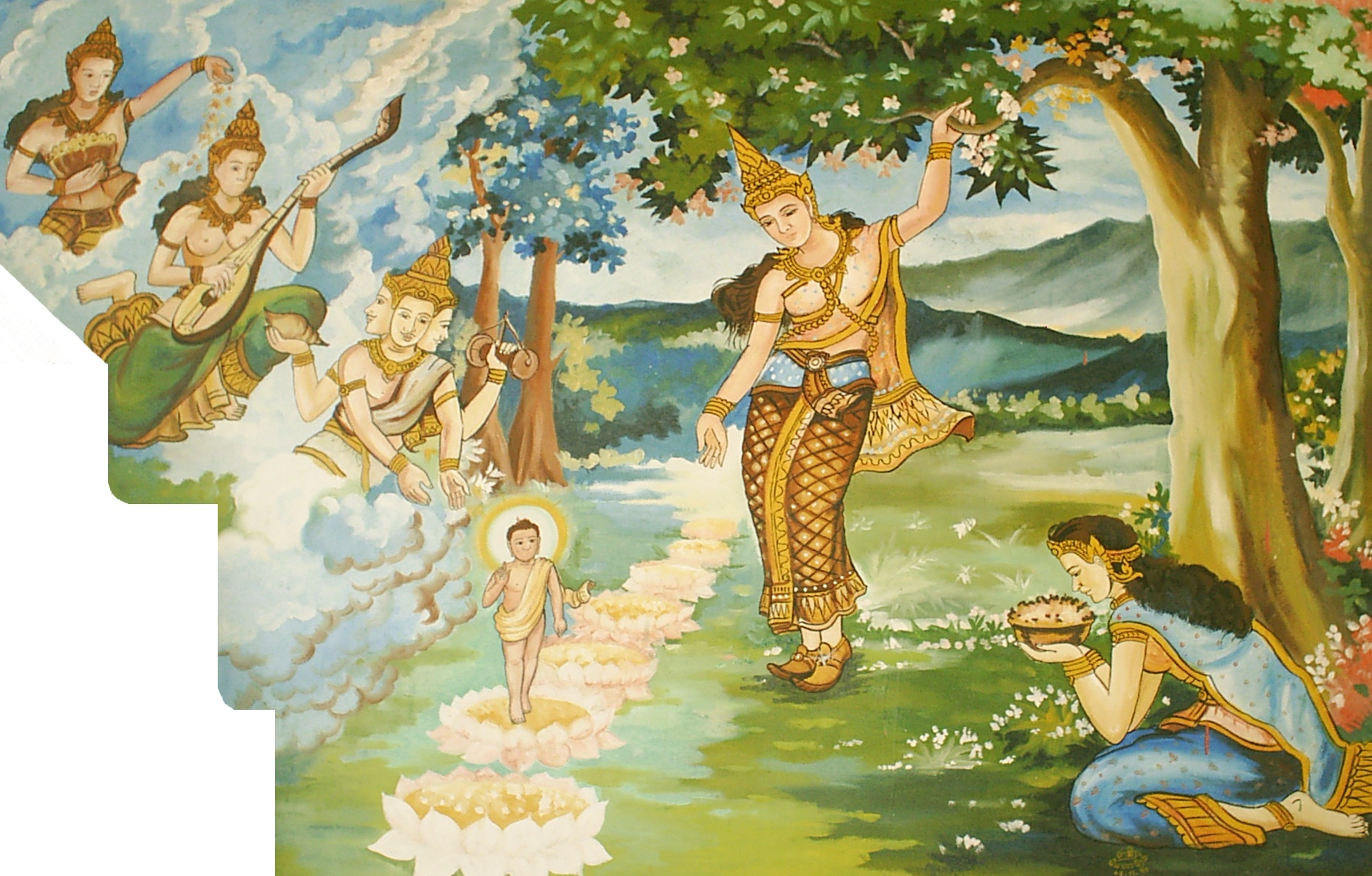
The birth of Gautama Buddha, in a forest at Lumbini. The legend goes that directly after his birth, he made 7 steps and proclaimed that he would end suffering and attain supreme enlightenment in this life.

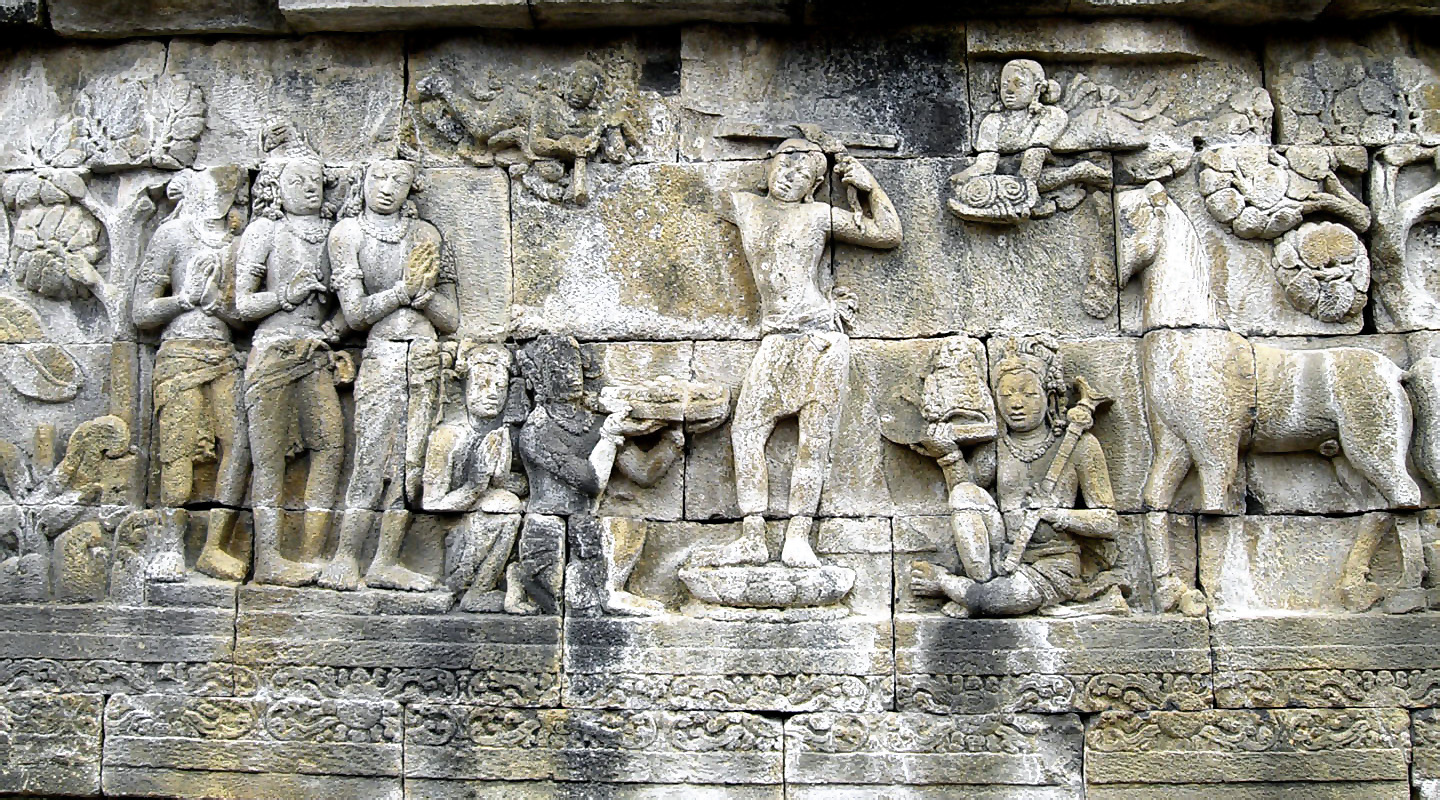
Prince Siddhartha Gautama cuts his hair and becomes a renunciant. Borobudur

While the early texts were mostly completed in the pre-Ashokan period, the post-Ashokan period saw the widespread adoption of Buddhism as a popular religion. At this time, Buddhism was spreading across the Indian subcontinent and beyond, and several distinct schools were emerging in different regions. It seems likely that each school would have used the life of the Buddha as a primary teaching vehicle. Several distinctive versions of this story survive. While these vary greatly in their literary forms, there is little doctrinal difference between them. Such texts include the following:

- Mahāvastu (“Great Story”) of the Mahāsaṁghika-Lokuttaravāda. This text is written in Hybrid Sanskrit, and is a loose compilation of diverse texts from multiple sources, sometimes repeating the same story, and with little attempt to create literary unity.
- Buddhacarita (“Life of the Buddha”) by Aśvaghoṣa. This is a sophisticated and polished Sanskrit epic poem by one of India's foremost poets.
- Lalitavistara Sūtra (“The Play in Detail”) of the Sarvāstivādins. Styled as a Sanskrit sutra, the Lalitavistara was very popular in northern forms of Buddhism. It is the basis for many events carved in Borobudur.
- The Theravāda "Discussion of the Links" (Nidana-katha) of the "Discussion of the Meaning of the Birth Stories" (Jataka-attha-katha). This is situated as the introduction and setting for the Pali Jātaka stories found in the commentaries compiled in the Mahāvihāra in Sri Lanka. This forms the basis for standard account of the lives of the Buddha in Theravāda Buddhism.
- Mūlasarvāstivāda Vinaya. While all the Vinayas contain some narrative, this text—extant in Sanskrit, Tibetan, and Chinese—includes a full life of the Buddha, replete with abundant legendary narrative.
- Abhiniṣkramana Sūtra.

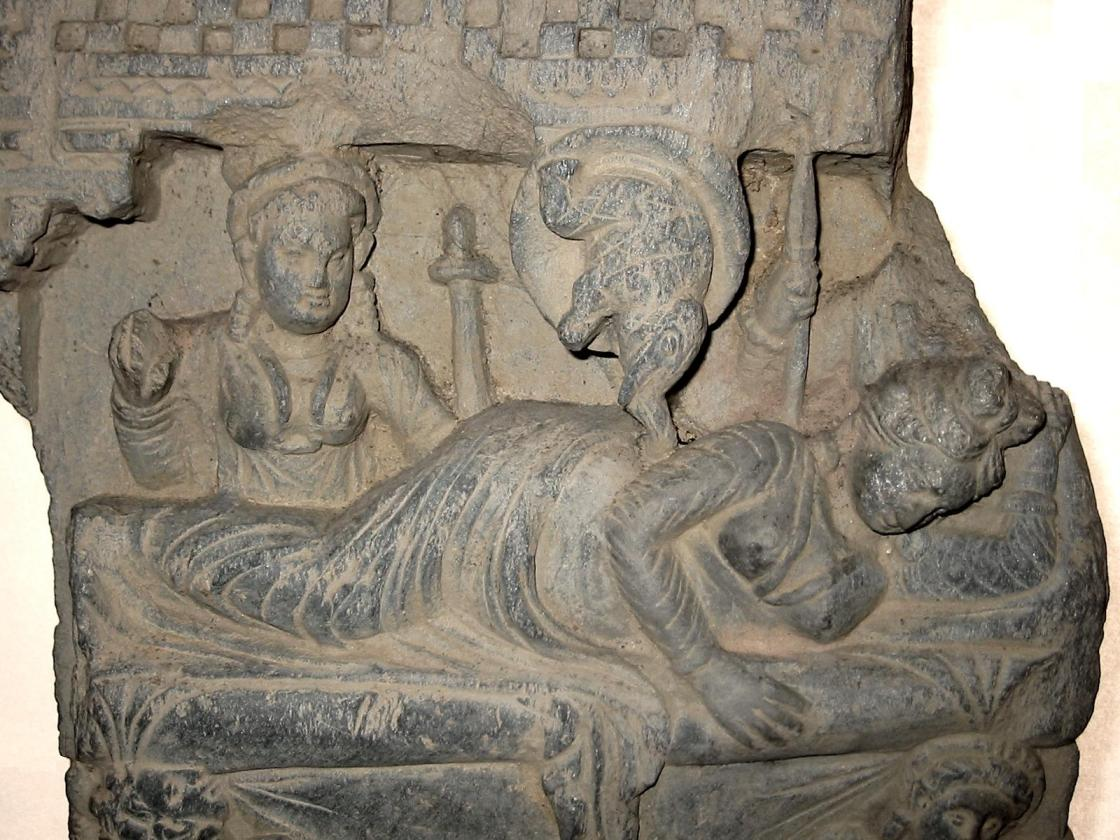
Queen Māyā's white elephant dream, and the conception of the Buddha. Gandhara, 2nd–3rd century CE.

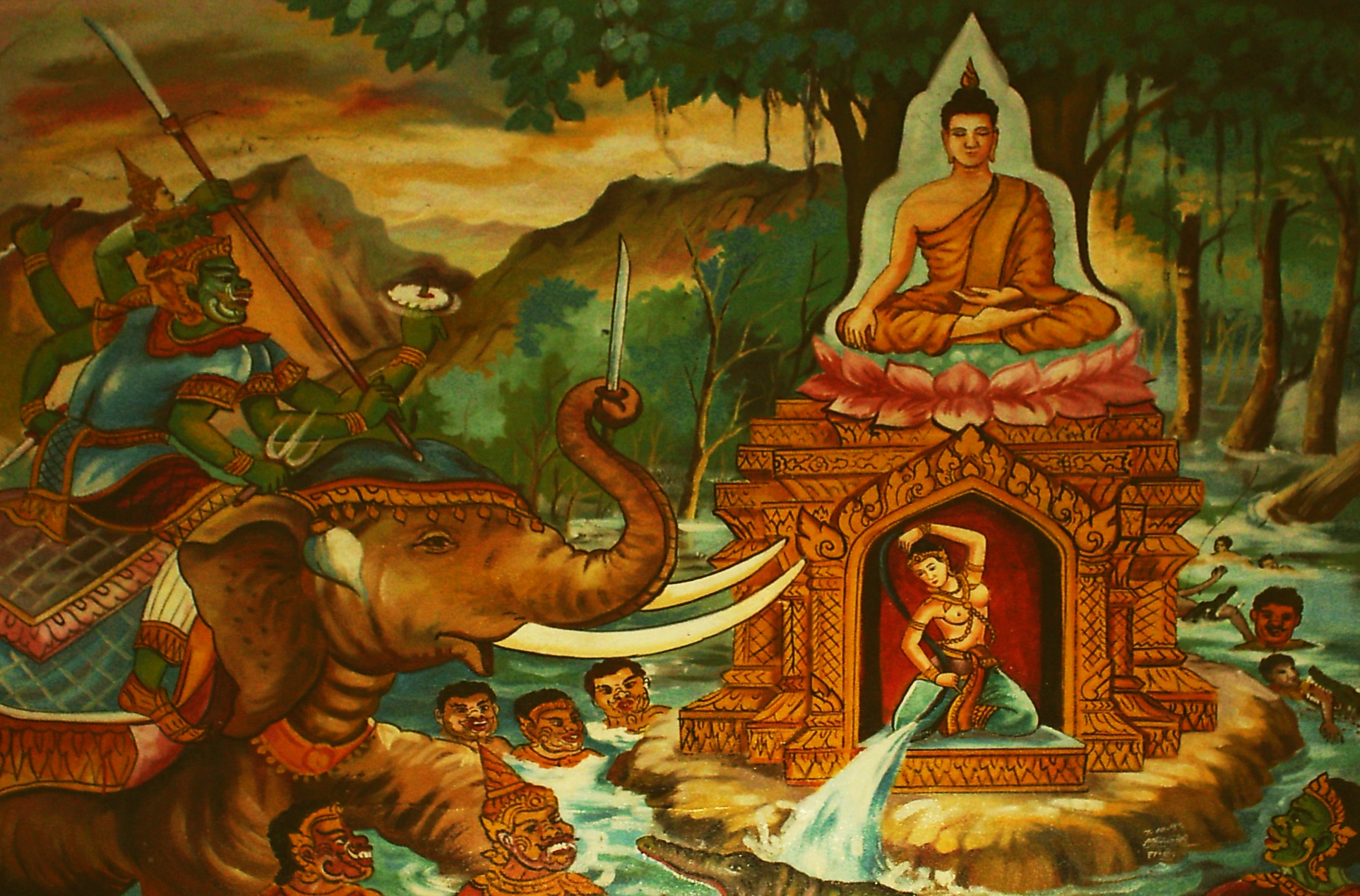
Battle with Mara

Despite the fact that these texts emerged in different schools over a long period, in different literary forms, they each share a range of motifs in the Buddha's life that is not found in the early texts. Such motifs include:

- The Buddha's mother, Māyā, dreaming of a white elephant.
- Lotuses springing up under the feet of the bodhisattva as he walked immediately after birth.
- Various encounters with Devadatta and others as a child.
- Seeing the four signs.
- The bodhisattva leaving his wife and child, often on the night of the birth.
- The bodhisattva's horse, Kaṇṭhaka, who carried him away, but later died of grief.
- Meeting a hunter and exchanging robes.
- Floating the bowl upstream.
- The offering of milk rice by Sujātā.
- The attack by Māra's armies.
- The earth goddess witnessing the bodhisattva's past practice.

Many of these motifs are represented in early artwork, and one of the motivating factors in such developments was to present the teachings in a way that could form a dramatic personal story, which could be visually represented. For example, the Padhāna Sutta, an early text, depicts the assault of Māra in purely psychological terms, while the developed versions imagine a vast army of demons attacking the Buddha, an image which is frequently depicted in Buddhist artwork.

These later works also show a much greater emphasis on the miraculous and extraordinary character of the Buddha, as they depict him more like a godlike being in contrast to the earlier texts. These developments in the mythology have their counterparts in the more philosophical texts, where the Buddha is conceived as omniscient and with trascendental powers (lokuttara).

== Other Indian Buddhist myths ==
=== Past and future Buddhas ===
Buddhist mythology contains legends of the Buddhas of past ages, such as Vipassi. An important source for these is the Pali Theravāda Buddhavamsa (Buddha Chronicle) which chronicles the stories of 24 past Buddhas.

Buddhist works also include a wide range of prophetic myths, which speak of future events. As with the Jātakas, there are a few such stories in the early texts. The most famous is the Cakkavatti Sīhanāda Sutta of the Dīgha Nikāya. This is the only early text to mention Metteyya, the future Buddha. It is an apocalyptic text, which predicts that humanity's moral conduct will decline so far that civilization will utterly break down. After a long time society will reform, based on the principle of non-violence, and ultimately a golden age will arrive, with the future Buddha Metteyya as the teacher of that age.

Later texts such as the Maitreyavyakarana introduce Mahayana elements to the prophetic story of Maitreya. A complex mythology developed around the messianic figure of the future Buddha Maitreya, which has inspired multiple Buddhist cults of both the past and the present. He became an influential figure in the millennarian and messianic movements throughout East Asia. According to Paul Williams, there were "nine such movements in China in the fifth and early sixth centuries alone."

=== Kings, saints and gods ===
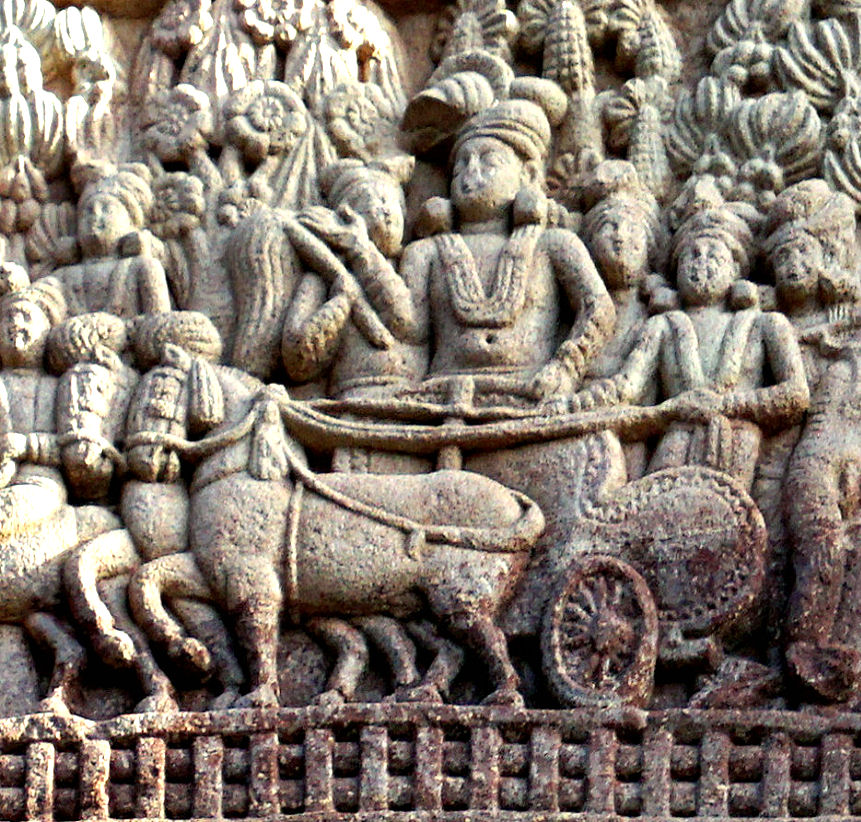
Ashoka's visit to the Ramagrama stupa, Southern gateway of Sanchi Stupa 1.

Buddhist traditions contain large numbers of stories and spiritual narratives in addition to the above. These are often simple moral fables, similar to Jātakas. In some cases, mythic complexes can be discerned that have no counterparts in the orthodox texts, but are found widely in popular culture. Various figures other than the Buddha appear in these myths, including Buddhist kings, important monastics and saints, as well as heavenly beings or gods (devas).

Indian kings feature in many Buddhist stories and myths. The earliest texts speak of various kings paying respects to the Buddha such as Pasenadi of Kosala and Bimbisara of Magadha. The Buddhist myths which developed around the famed Mauryan emperor Ashoka (recorded in texts such as the Ashokavadana) as well as other Buddhist monarchs such as the indo Greek Milinda (Menander I) and Sri Lankan Buddhist kings (in texts like the Dipavamsa) are also important sources of Buddhist mythology. These stories serve as morality tales and as models for Buddhist kingship which were emulated and used by later Buddhist monarchies throughout the Buddhist world. These royal myths touch on more secular issues such as the relationship between the monastic community and the state as well as the king's role in the world (and by extension the role of laypersons).

Buddhist myths also tell stories about important disciples of the Buddha and later Buddhist saints (known as arahants). Especially important are his Ten Principal Disciples such as Śāripūtra and Maudgalyāyana as well as female disciples of the Buddha, such as Mahapajapati Gotami (the first nun) and his wife Yaśodharā. Another important figure is Aṅgulimāla, who was a mass murderer before becoming a monk under the Buddha. His tale serves as a story of redemption.

Later Buddhist saints such as Mahinda and Sanghamitta, both children of Ashoka are also part of Buddhist myths. Another example are stories related to the cult of the monk Upagupta who, according to legend, lived in the time of Ashoka. He does not appear in central Pali texts, but is a well known figure in the northern regions of Theravāda, including northern Myanmar, Thailand, and Laos. In these regions a variety of tales with related themes and motifs occur, and form the basis of ritual activity, usually carried out by the lay people. Such activities occur in a liminal space on the edge of the officially sanctioned Theravādin praxis.

Buddhist myths also feature heavenly beings, called devas. Buddhist myth adopted several Indian figures such as Brahma, Indra (also known as Sakka) and Prithvi.

=== Sectarian myths ===
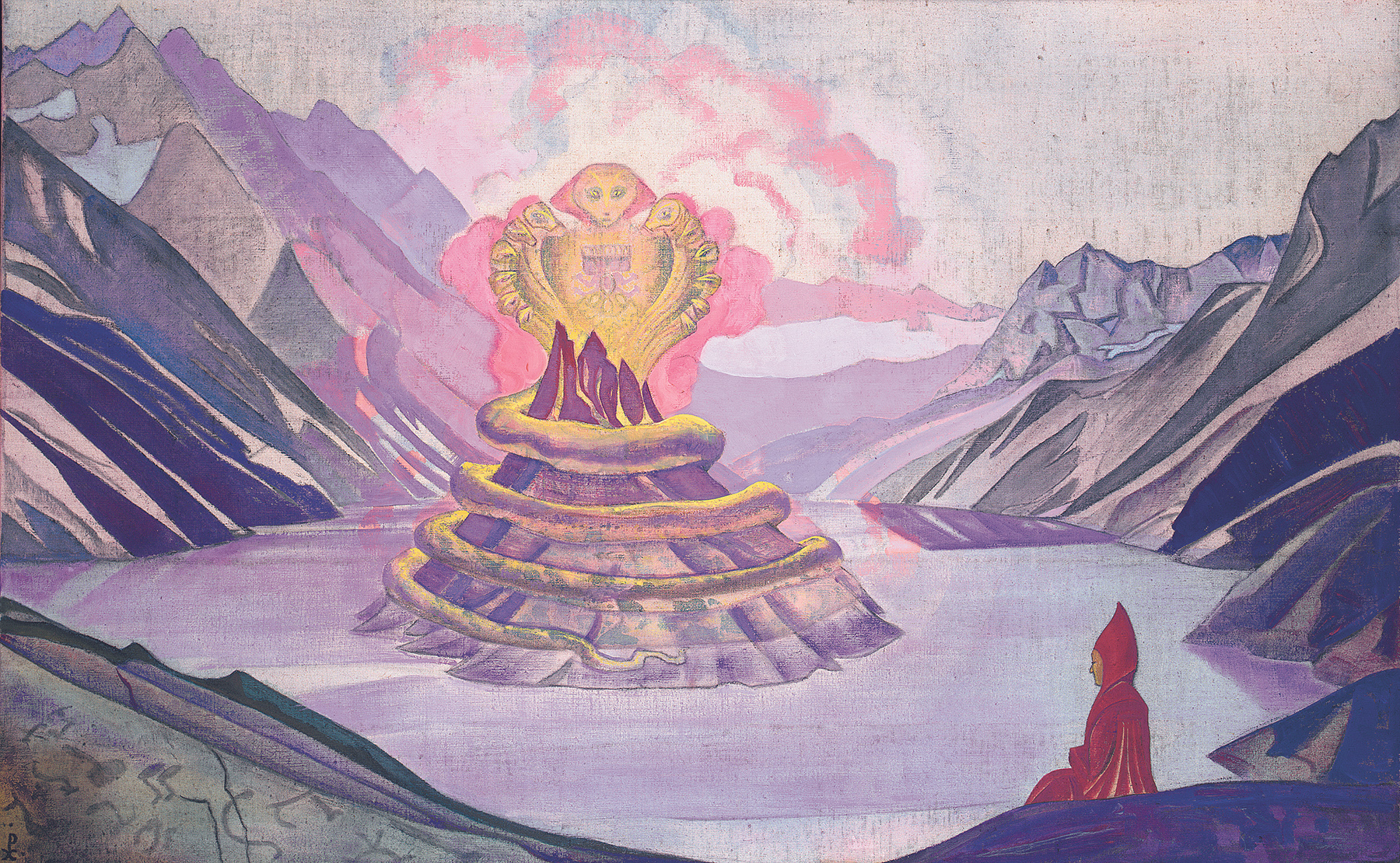
Nicholas Roerich's "Nagarjuna Conqueror of the Serpent" depicting the Mahayana origin myth of the prajñaparamita sutras.

The schools of Buddhism told stories of the origin of their own particular school. These narratives function like creation myths, explaining how the school came to be, and why it has a special authority to convey the Buddha's teaching. Unlike the pan-sectarian myths of the Buddha's life or the Jātakas, these exist specifically to promote one's own school in relation to contemporary rivals. Such sectarian myths also typically include an account of how the Dharma triumphed over primitive and violent religious cults, especially human or animal sacrifice in worship of yakkhas.

The Theravāda origin story is found in multiple places, such as the Dīpavaṁsa, where the Buddha himself is said to have predicted the spread of Theravāda to Sri Lanka. Moreover, in both the Dīpavaṁsa (Island Chronicle) and the Mahāvaṃsa (Great Chronicle), the Buddha is said to have actually visited the island three times. The Sarvāstivādins located their origins in the time of Ashoka, claiming to be the true Dharma that spread to Kashmir when Buddhism in the Middle Country had become corrupt.

Other stories developed to give authority to certain texts. The Mahāyānists needed to address the fact that their texts were unknown in the initial period of Buddhism, and developed stories such as that they had been hidden in the realm of the nagas (snake-like supernatural beings) until people wise enough to understand them were born. Some versions of the myth state that the Indian philosopher Nagarjuna magically flew to the city of the nagas and retrieved the hidden sutras. Other myths deal with Buddhas in other worlds which can be reached through dreams or meditative visions such as Maitreya or Amitabha and who reveal new texts and teachings such as the five treatises of Maitreya. Later Mahayana Buddhists also wrote their own biographies of the Buddha which included Mahayana elements, such as the biography in the Tibetan Bu-ston's (1290–1364) Chos ’byung (“History of Buddhism”).

Similarly, the promoters of the Theravādin Abhidhamma claimed that Abhidhamma had been taught by the Buddha to his mother in Tusita heaven. Other myths follow inanimate objects such as Buddhist relics. For example, the Pali text called the Bodhivamsa describes the bringing of a cutting from the Bodhi tree to Sri Lanka, while the Thūpavaṃsa tells the story of the Mahathupa ('Great Stupa') at Anuradhapura.

Likewise, with the development of Tantric Buddhism and their new texts called Tantras, they also developed legends which sought to legitimate these texts as Buddhavacana (word of the Buddha) despite the fact that historically they could not have been taught during the time of Gautama Buddha. One of the most prominent of these are the various legends surrounding a figure known as king Indrabhuti. In one version of the myth translated by Ronald M. Davidson, it states that during the Buddha's time, nobody was ready for tantra on earth, so it was taught in Tusita heaven. Afterwards, Vajrapani brought the tantric teachings to the country of Zahor to King Indrabhuti, who was instructed in their meaning by a teacher called Kukuraja.

Such mythologies developed, not just as “official” sectarian doctrines, but as local tales. For example, in most Buddhist countries there is a story of how the historical Buddha visited their country and foretold that the Dharma would be established there.

== Mahāyāna mythology ==
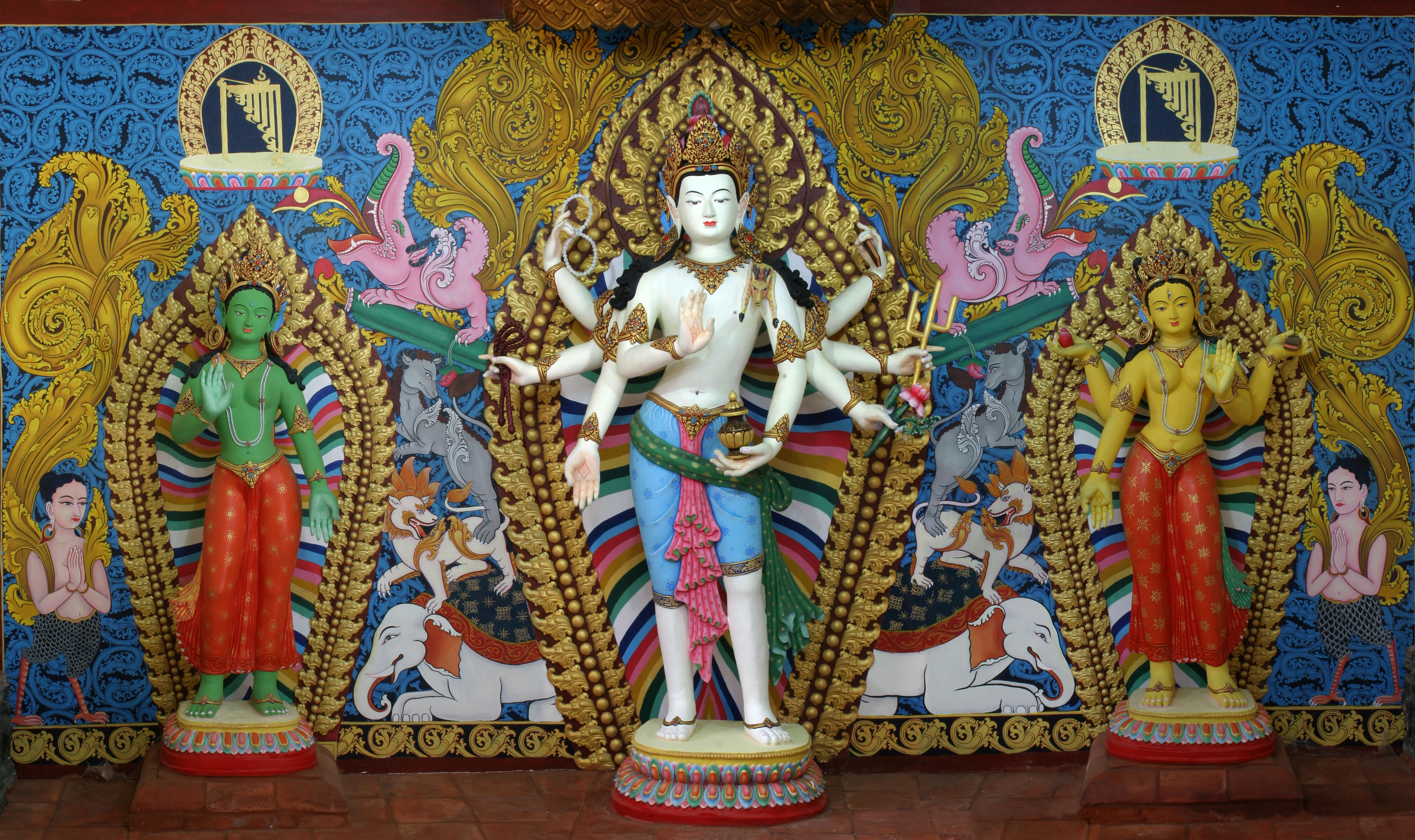
Amoghpasha Lokesvara flanked by Arya Tara and Bhrikuti Tara enshrined at the side wing of Vasuccha Shil Mahavihar, Guita Bahi, Patan : This set of images is popular in traditional monasteries of Kathmandu Valley, Nepal.

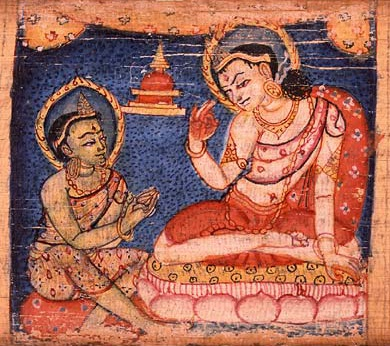
Sudhana learning from one of the fifty-two teachers along his journey toward enlightenment. Sanskrit manuscript, 11-12th century.

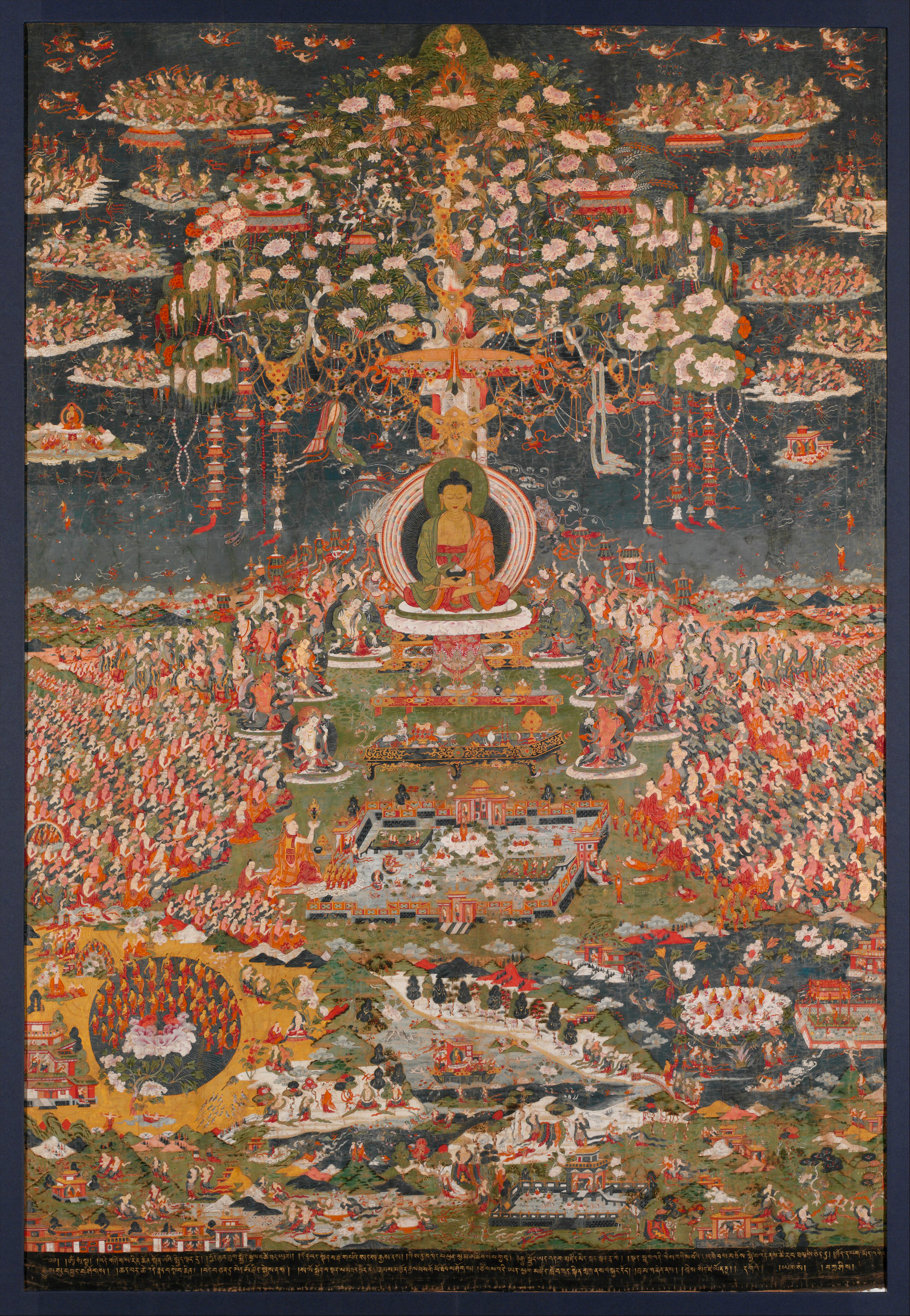
Amitabha, the Buddha of Eternal Life, in Sukhavati, the Western Pure Land. He is surrounded by followers, demigods, bodhisattvas and offerings. At the bottom are courtyards, giant lotus flowers, and pools from which the purified are being reborn.

In addition to the Mahāyāna origin story, Mahāyanist texts include a wide variety of narratives and mythologies, with numerous divine figures and stories that do not appear in the earlier texts. These vary from dramatic or humorous tales, to abstract philosophical parables. Mahayana sutras such as the Lotus sutra and the Avatamsaka Sutra contain popular stories and parables which have been widely influential in Mahayana Buddhism.

A central figure in Mahāyāna myths is the Bodhisattva, a spiritually advanced being who is on the path to Buddhahood. Some of these beings, such as Tara, Avalokiteshvara, Manjushri and Vajrapani, while not yet Buddhas, have developed extraordinary godlike powers by reaching the highest bodhisattva level. According to Paul Williams, Avalokiteshvara "is perhaps the most popular of all Mahayana Bodhisattvas" and is seen as the compassionate savior of all beings, working constantly using infinite forms and means to help others. Important sources for this figure are the Lotus sutra and the Karandavyuha sutra.

Other bodhisattvas are depicted as being still in the process of developing their skill in means (upaya) such as Sudhana of the Gaṇḍavyūha Sutra, and thus their stories serve as spiritual bildungsroman.

Buddhahood is also central to Mahayana mythology. A Buddha in Mahayana texts is also much more exalted and extraordinary than in earlier texts. A godlike being, a Buddha in the Mahayana imaginary has lived and will continue to live for countless eons preaching his doctrine in innumerable ways and means to innumerable numbers of beings. Regarding the Buddha Gautama, his limited "human" life on earth was merely an illusion, a docetic mirage which merely appears to perform human actions such as eating and so on. Another important feature of Mahāyāna Buddhist myths is that they include Buddhas other than Gautama Buddha, such as Amitābha, Bhaisajyaguru, Vairocana and Akshobhya, each with their own texts. These Buddhas are said to live in other realms, called Buddhafields (buddhakṣetra, also known as Pure Lands) and to still be reachable in meditation, visions or through their intermediaries. These other worlds are said to extend infinitely in all directions, each containing a Buddha which teaches in their Buddhafield. A Buddha such as Amitābha for example (one of the most popular Buddhas in East Asia), was associated with his vow that anyone who recited his name would be reborn in his pure land as well as with the bodhisattva Avalokiteshvara. These other Buddhas were also seen as the source of some of the Mahayana sutras like the Pure land sutras and the Aksobhyavyuha sutras.

The hagiographies of Indian Mahayana figures such as Asanga and Nagarjuna, and the stories associated with them are also important in the mythology of Mahayana Buddhism. Biographies of the Indian philosopher Nagarjuna for example, depict him as a great brahmin sorcerer with powerful magics who made himself and his friends invisible once to enter a palace and violate the women. After his escape, his friends were all killed and this led him to the spiritual life and to the study of all the Buddha Dharma. This eventually led him to the discovery of the prajñaparamita sutras with the aid of the Naga king

These stories and figures also further evolved in East Asian Buddhism, for example, in time the male figure of Avalokiteshvara transformed into the female motherly figure of Guanyin which has her own East Asian mythic corpus. East Asian Buddhism (all of which is Mahāyāna) also developed further regional and school specific mythologies as Buddhism continued to evolve and adapt. Stories and legends about founding figures and patriarchs of East Asian Buddhist schools are one such development. One example are the numerous stories which developed around the Zen patriarch Bodhidharma which serve to explain how Zen Buddhism is supposed to have arrived in China. (Note: There are three principal sources for Bodhidharma's biography: Yáng Xuànzhī's The Record of the Buddhist Monasteries of Luoyang (547); Tánlín's preface to the Two Entrances and Four Acts (6th century CE), which is also preserved in Ching-chüeh's Chronicle of the Lankavatar Masters (713-716); Daoxuan's Further Biographies of Eminent Monks (7th century CE).) Another widely recognized figure which developed in China is the fat and jolly figure named Budai, which developed in Zen texts such as the Transmission of the Lamp.

Another very popular example of East Asian Buddhist myth is contained in one of China's classical novels, Journey to the West, which developed around stories of the Chinese monk Xuanzang and his travels to India. These stories merge Buddhist myth with ideas from Chinese folk religion, Chinese mythology, as well as Confucian and Taoist beliefs.

== Forms of myth ==
=== Literature ===
The primary source for Buddhist myth is the vast Buddhist literature. The corpus is extensive; over 500 Jātakas exist in Pali alone and there are various complete Buddhist canons in different languages.

The Jātakas remain closely linked to the oral tradition of the early Buddhist texts. The core of the story is a set of verses, which in the Pali tradition are the only part considered canonical. The story, and the framing narrative that tells the events of the Buddha's day, are commentary. However, as shown by Thomas Rhys Davids, verse and prose must have been passed down together in many cases. This is typical of Pali oral literature, where a fixed canonically portion was accompanied by a much larger and more fluid commentary, which itself would gradually become canon. When taught, the verses would typically be recited verbatim, while the story would be elaborated and adapted by each storyteller.

By way of contrast, a developed literary work such as the Sanskrit epic poems of the great Indian poet Aśvaghoṣa such as the Buddhacarita and the Saundarananda were written down and carefully planned examples of the Indian Mahākāvya genre. Drawing on the already elaborate literary heritage of Indian Buddhism, Aśvaghoṣa employed a huge vocabulary and complex poetic methods to create sophisticated texts for the enjoyment of an educated class. Aśvaghoṣa's compositions, written in polished Sanskrit, are carefully structured and arranged. In these texts, there are also numerous allusions to Brahmanical legends and epic narratives.

=== Performance ===
Cham dance during Dosmoche festival 2018 at Leh Palace

There are indications that Indian Buddhists developed edifying dramas, perhaps with musical accompaniment. Aśvaghoṣa is known to have written a Buddhist drama, the Sariputra-Prakarana, which only survives in fragments. It is the oldest dramatic work of Sanskrit literature yet discovered. Such performances became popular in Buddhist cultures.

In pre-modern Asia, the oral and dramatic performance of Jātaka stories was another way in which Buddhist myth was propagated. This tradition remains active in Southeast Asian countries today, where Jātakas tales are performed in theater, dance and recitations during certain special occasions like during Buddhist holidays.

In Tibet and other regions where Tibetan Buddhism has spread, various performances of sacred myth are also popular, such as the Cham Dance a costume dance which illustrates Buddhist moral values.

=== Art ===
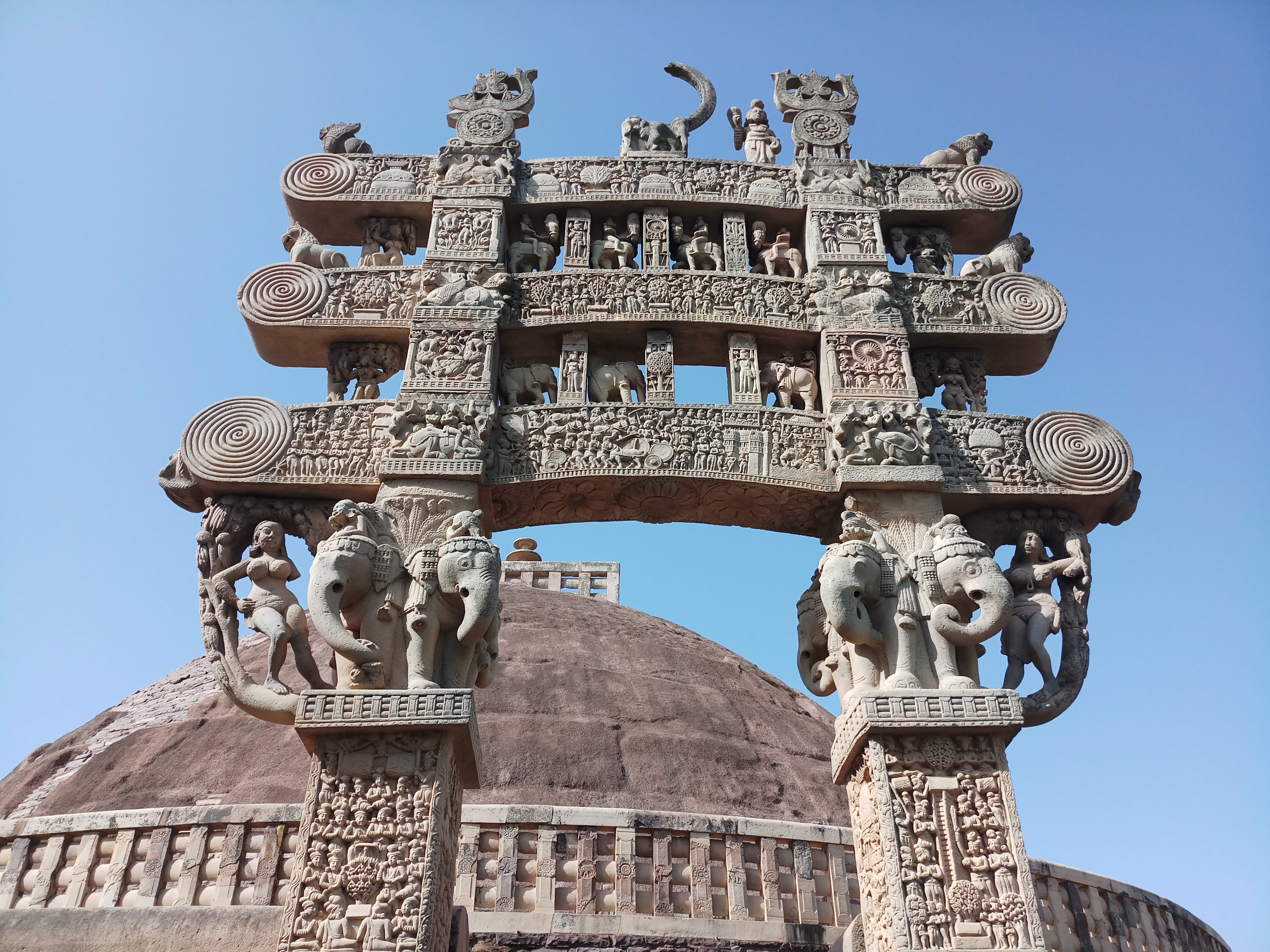
Gateway, Sanchi stupa

There is no art, or any other physical remains, from the earliest period of Buddhism. The first Buddhist art appears in the Ashokan period. But Ashoka's pillars, while artistically superb, do not tell myths.

Perhaps 100 years after Ashoka, we have our first known Buddhist stupa complexes, which contain substantial and elaborate art. As well as drawing on motifs from the early texts, these frequently depict episodes from Jātakas and from the evolved form of the Buddha's life. The art that has survived is sculpture in stone, although this must be the remnants of a much richer heritage in more perishable materials.

In addition to purely decorative motifs, we frequently find art arranged in a sequence, or a roundel, depicting various events selected from a particular story. These would presumably have been used as a story-telling framework, a precursor to our modern graphic novels. A teacher, presumably a monk or nun, would tell the story illustrated by the pictures, or else people who knew the story would remind themselves of it. This method was developed fully in Borobudur, where the stories wind around the huge structure. In many modern Buddhist temples, especially those that are popular tourist sites, murals play the same role.

== Themes ==
=== Renunciation ===
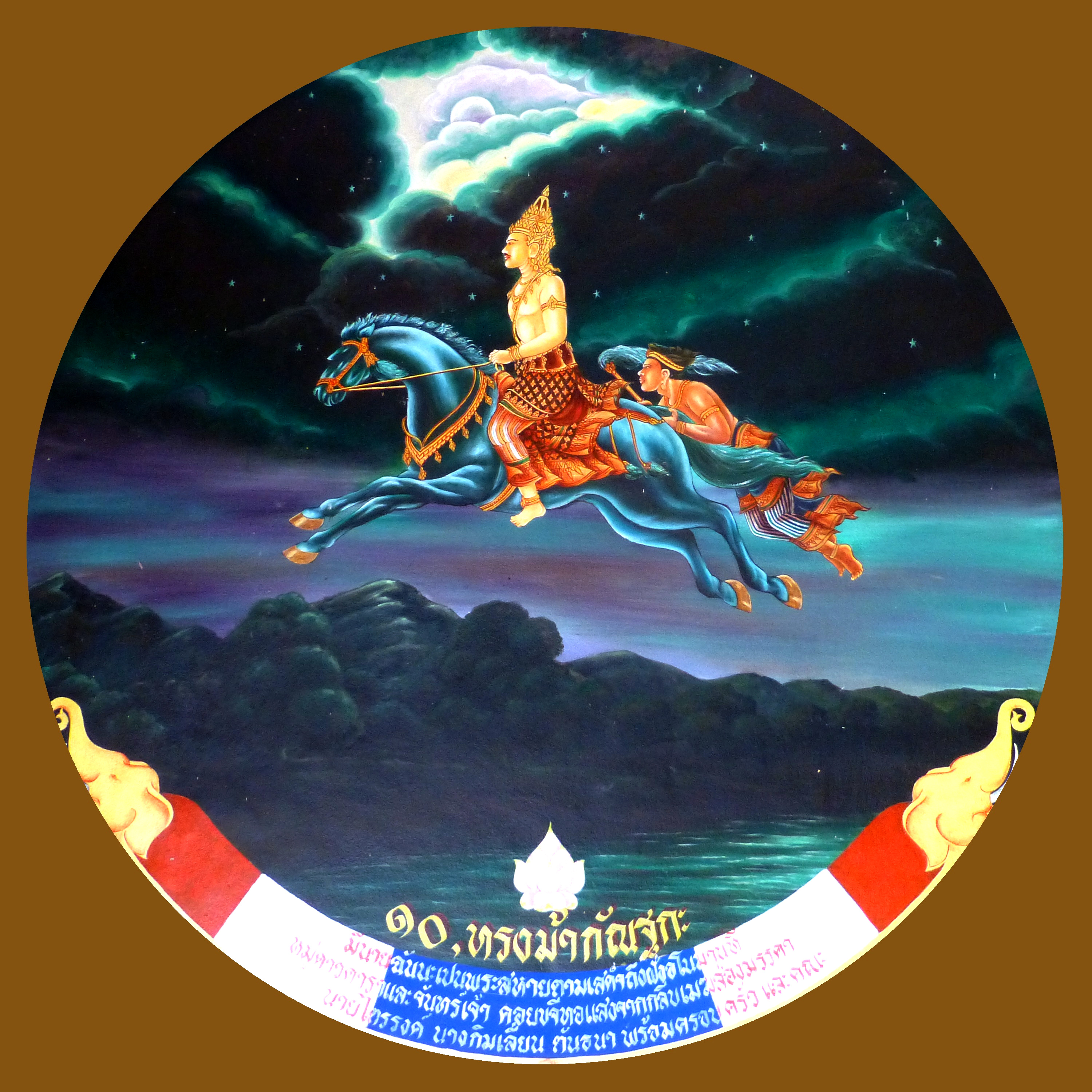
The Bodhisatta rides on his horse Kanthaka crossing the River Anoma on the night of his renunciation. His charioteer Channa holds the tail. Chedi Traiphop Traimongkhon Temple, Hatyai Thailand.

The key event in the life of the Buddha is his leaving home. This event dramatizes the conflict between the “worldly” values of sex, family, career, and prosperity and the “spiritual” values of renunciation and dispassion (virāga). This tension is a defining characteristic of Buddhist myth. Numerous Buddhist stories each tell the event in different ways, sometimes evoking the bodhisattva's pain in leaving his wife and child, as well as his father's efforts to entice him to stay and the sadness experienced by his wife Yashodhara and his charioteer Channa.

The renunciation is also dealt with repeatedly in the Jātakas, with further variations. In some cases, the bodhisattva leaves home with his wife, or with both wife and children, or even with the whole city. In one case, the wife leaves the bodhisattva to raise the children.

=== Awakening and final Nirvana ===
Following on from renunciation is the event of the Buddha's awakening (bodhi) or liberation (vimutti, nirvana). In Buddhism this refers to an insight into the truth that leads to the end of suffering. In the doctrinal texts this is presented in psychological and existential terms, which the myths translate into narrative and imagery.

In these narrative depictions, Māra's armies representing darkness and desire are portrayed as literal demonic forces rather than mere psychological impulses. The Bodhisattva overcomes them not through insight alone, but by invoking the Earth Goddess (Dhāriṇī or Pṛthivī). Acting as an ancient deity and witness to his past lives (Jātakas), she testifies to his accumulated merit, thereby routing the demonic host.

Each detail of the awakening experience become imbued with mythic significance. The place where the Buddha sat, described in the early texts simply as a pleasant place suitable for meditation, becomes the “navel of the world”. It is the only place on earth strong enough to bear the weight of the awakening, and is used by all Buddhas, past, present, and future.

The event of his death and final release (paranirvana) from the realm of rebirth (samsara) are also important themes which are taken up in numerous Buddhist myths. For Buddhists, it was important to explain the death of the Buddha as a monumental event. Some Buddhists such as the Lokuttaravada developed a docetic myth, which said that the Buddha did not really die, only appearing to do so, since his nature was supramundane.

=== Geography and Cosmology ===
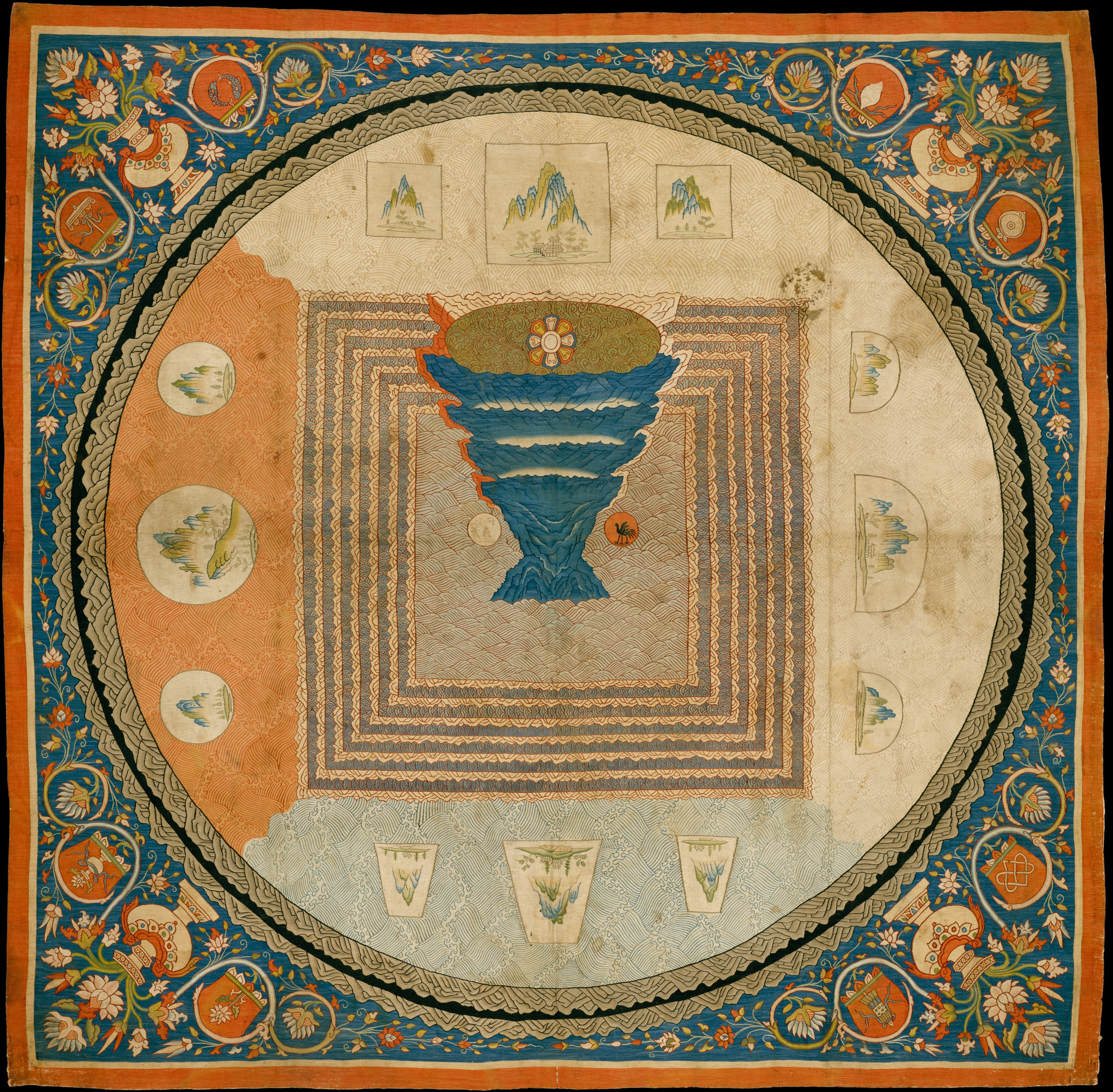
Silk tapestry mandala with cosmological diagram, Yuan dynasty (1271–1368). Mount Meru at the center, with the sun and moon at the base (symbolized by a bird and rabbit) and the four continents in the cardinal directions.

Buddhist cosmology has an expansive view of time and space, with multiple world systems (lokāḥ) divided into different planes of existence (dhātus) which go back countless eons (kalpas). The Buddhist (and Indic) view of time is cyclical instead of linear or progressive. World systems or universes go through cycles, from birth to destruction, and see similar patterns arise again and again. These patterns include the birth and awakening of a Buddha as well as the degeneration and eventual loss of the Dharma. Mythic return is thus a crucial theme in Buddhist cosmology. An important feature of this is that in the Buddhist universe, there is no single beginning or myth of a first creation. The Buddha is said to have stated that the world is "without discoverable beginning, a first point is not discerned of beings roaming and wandering on." Thus while individual world systems (lokāḥ) go through cycles of birth and destruction (which are explained as being caused by natural processes related to the four elements), the entire system of samsara itself or the "multiverse" consisting of all universes has no single point of origination in time or a single cause/prime mover. Thus Buddhist cosmology and myth rejects theistic creationism.

Mahayana Buddhism added the concept of an infinity of Buddhafields created by innumerable Buddhas, all of which are interconnected with one another. The medieval texts known as the Buddhist tantras introduced more elaborate elements into the Buddhist cosmological system, including astrological elements and new myths such as that of the kingdom of Shambala from the Kalacakra tantra.

=== Kingship and politics ===
One of the earliest mythic motifs in the Buddha's life is the notion that he is a “Great Man” (mahāpurisa), who must choose his destiny. If he remains in the home, he will become a righteous universal emperor or "wheel turning monarch" (Pali: Cakkavatti; Sanskrit: Cakravartin), while if he chooses the way of renunciation he will become a Buddha. Of course, the historical bodhisattva chooses renunciation, but stories are told of those in the past who chose kingship. These are depicted to show an ideal of Buddhist leadership, one who rules without violence (ahimsa) while exemplifying and promoting Buddhist values. Buddhist kings are also seen as protectors and supporters of the Buddhist community. The deeds of a great Buddhist king include the protection of animals and the building of public works such as parks, wells, and roads.

The stories Mauryan emperor Ashoka also added to the mythological elements of the myth of "Dharma King" (dhammaraja) and his great deeds. In much of Buddhist myth, Ashoka is the royal "exemplar par excellence" who exemplifies the ten royal virtues: generosity, moral virtue, self-sacrifice, kindness, self-control, non-anger, nonviolence, patience, and adherence to the norm of righteousness. This figure was much emulated by later Buddhist kings, who built stupas and temples and patronized the monastic community in imitation of Ashoka. This mimesis of the Ashoka myth by Asian Buddhist rulers is one way in which Buddhist myth influenced the Asian political ideology of states such as Angkor, Sukhothai and Pagan.

The Jātakas depict many examples of kings and of the bodhisattva Gautama himself who was a king in many past lives, the most famous throughout Southeast Asia being the Vessantara Jataka. The Vessantara Jataka is basically a royal epic, whose hero is not a conqueror or warrior, but a hero of the Buddhist virtue of generosity (dāna) who takes a vow never to refuse to give away anything which might be asked of him. In Thailand this Jataka is told or performed at large ceremonies such as the “Bun Phawet” in Roi Et, where Upagupta is honoured as well as the Buddha.

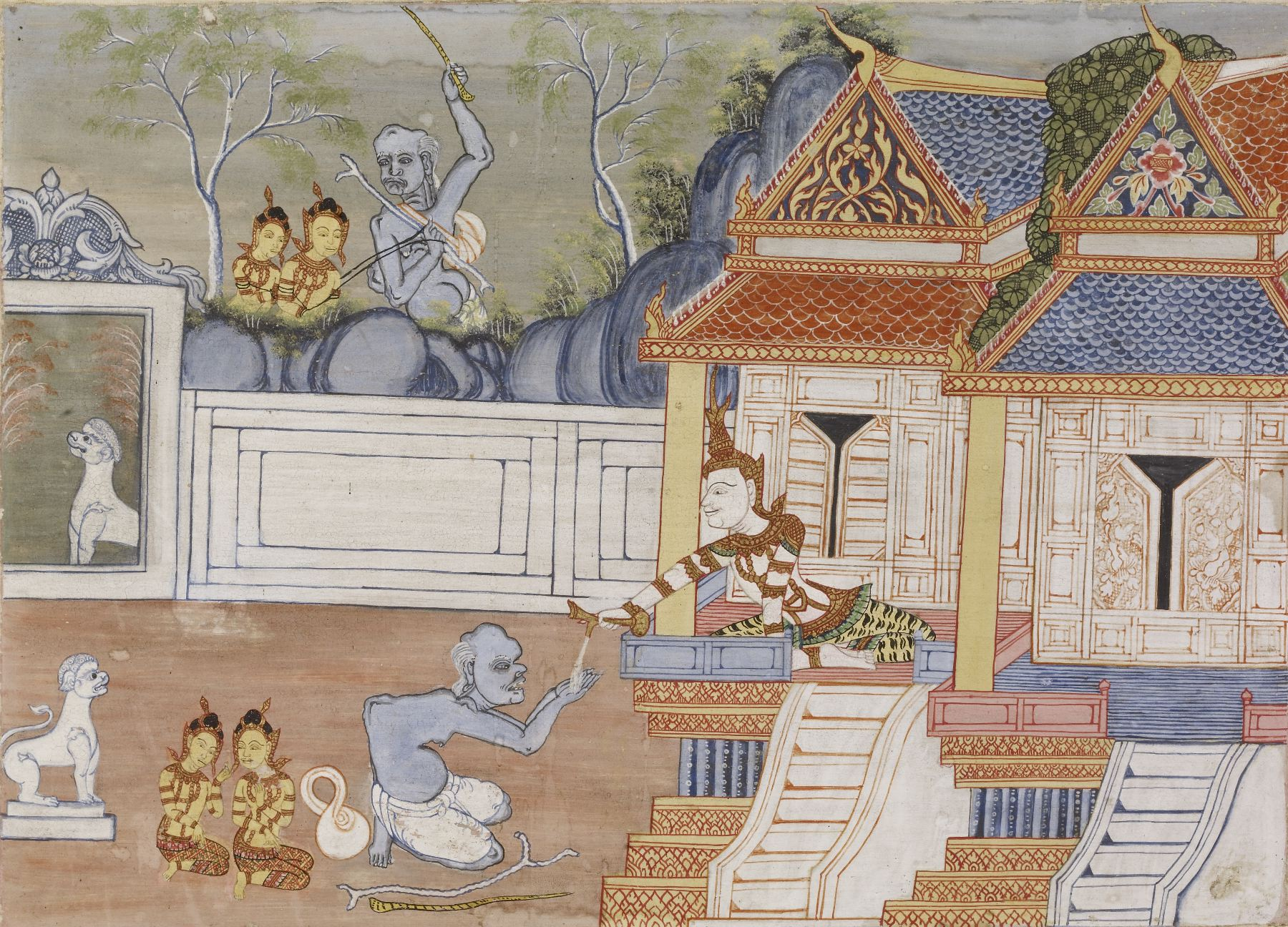
Thai Vessantara Jataka illustration, Chapter 8 (The Royal Children)

Buddhist myths continue to have an impact on the political world of Asian Buddhist nations. King Bhumipol of Thailand is famous for telling Jātaka stories, which often contain some comment or twist that illustrate current events. In his translation of the Mahājanaka Jātaka, for example, the ending was changed so that the bodhisattva no longer renounced the throne, but remained and educated his people in preserving the environment.

=== Manhood and physical prowess ===
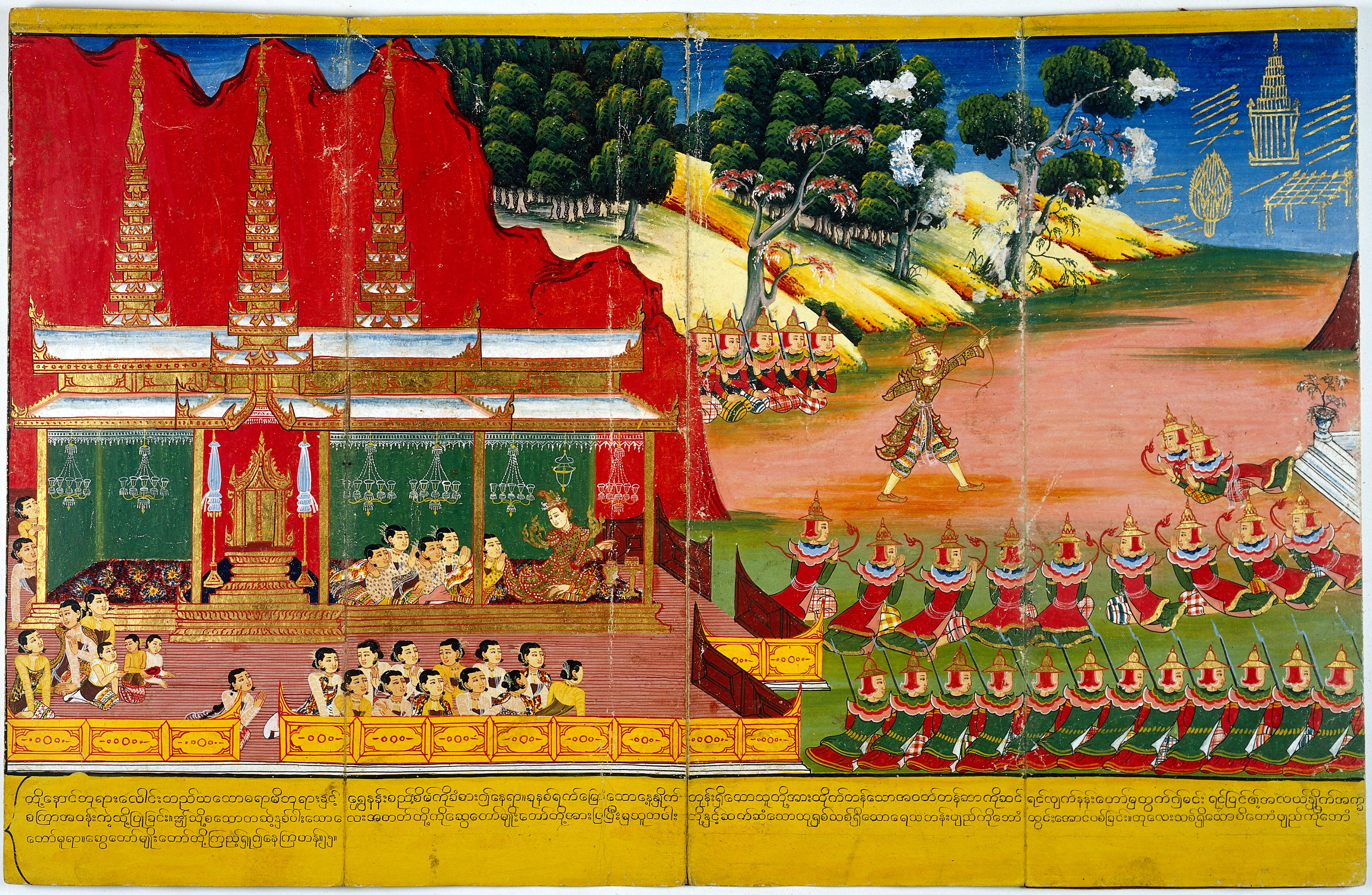
The Sarabhanga Jātaka depicts the bodhisattva in a past life giving an exhibition of his extraordinary skill in archery.

John Powers has noted how the story of the Buddha in Indian texts presents themes of male physical perfection, beauty and virtue. The Buddha is often depicted in Indian art and literature as a virile "Ultimate Man" (purusottama) and "is referred to by a range of epithets that extol his manly qualities, his extraordinarily beautiful body, his superhuman virility and physical strength, his skill in martial arts, and the effect he has on women who see him." He is given numerous epithets such as “god among men,” “possessing manly strength,” “victor in battle,” “unsurpassed tamer of men,” “bull of a man” and “fearless lion.” He is seen as having lived hundreds of past lives as cakravartins and as manly gods such as Indra and in his final life as Gautama, he excelled as a lover to many women in his palace harem as well as a warrior in the martial arts of a ksatriya. Texts such as the Lalitavistara (extensive sport) dwell on the martial contests that the young bodhisattva had to complete in order to gain his wife, concluding in an archery contest in which he "picks up a bow that no one else could draw and that few could even lift. He grasps it while sitting down, lifts it easily, and shoots an arrow through every target, which utterly eclipses the performances of all the others." The depictions of his ascetic training as well as his victory over the temptations of Mara and his final awakening are also often described as a result of his manly effort in a heroic battle. The ascetic life is also connected to virility. In ancient India, the celibacy and the retaining of semen was said to bring about strength, health and physical energy. The practice of celibacy and austerity was said to accumulate a spiritual energy called tapas. Thus even as a celibate ascetic, the Buddha can fulfill the mythical archetype of the supreme man and heroic warrior.

All these good qualities are associated with the idea that the Buddha has excellent karma and virtue and thus in Indian Buddhism, moral transformation was seen as being related to physical transformation. While usually overlooked in most scholarly literature, an important element of the Buddha mythology is the excellent physical characteristics of his body, which is adorned with what is termed the thirty two “physical characteristics of a great man” (mahapurusa-laksana), which are found only in Buddhas and in universal monarchs and are seen as proving their status as superior men. In parallel with the perfect physical qualities of the Buddha, some Buddhist female figures such as the Buddha's mother Maya are said to also have thirty two good qualities, thus male perfection and female perfection mirror each other.

The Buddha's perfection is also associated with supranormal feats (abhiñña) such as levitation, walking on water and telepathy. His powers are superior to that of the gods, and Indian deities like Brahma are depicted as being his disciples and accepting his superiority.

=== Women and gender ===
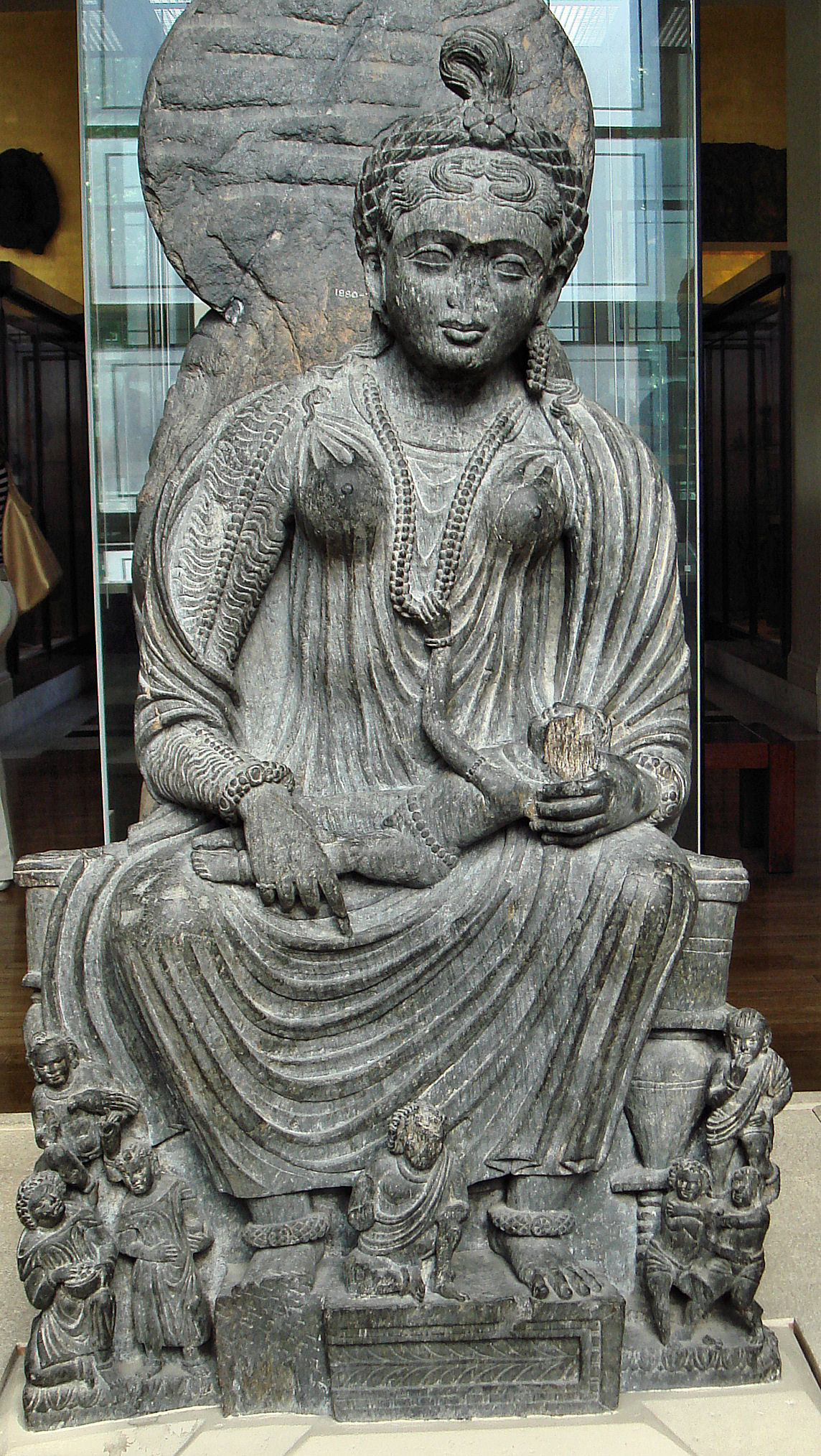
Motherly deity Hārītī

Feminine figures and issues of gender are also an important feature of Buddhist mythology. Traditionally, women are seen as capable of achieving the highest levels of spiritual attainment. Female figures in Buddhist myth include mother figures like the Buddha's mother Queen Maya (and her virgin birth myth) and the goddess Hārītī, monastics (bhikkhunīs) like Sanghamitta and Mahapajapati Gotami and extraordinary divine figures like Tara, Guanyin, Vajrayogini and Yeshe Tsongyal.

Buddhist myths and stories show an ambiguity in relation to gender. On the one hand, gender is seen as not a binary phenomenon. For example, there is fluidity in gender across lives. Frequently women are strong and capable. Gender roles are sometimes reversed, as when the bodhisattva's wife leaves him to raise the children as she becomes a nun. In some texts, gender is presented as a performance, and both men and women can engage in that performance with awareness. Transformation and escape from the traps of gender roles is made possible through a spiritual life, especially as a renunciant, and women are seen as capable of awakening just like men. Suzanne Mrozik, citing Elizabeth Grosz holds that in Indian Buddhism, bodies are "pliable" and "subject to transformation, because bodies are largely the products of our own actions.... Karma dictates the kind of body we get in any given lifetime—whether male or female, healthy or sick, beautiful or ugly, and so forth." There are also various Buddhist stories which depict a person changing genders, such as a story which depicts the Buddhist saint Asanga being changed into a woman and his use of yogic powers to transform back into a man. Another story from the Vimalakirti sutra has a goddess transform Sariputra into a woman to prove that gender is merely an empty conceptual construction with no real basis.

At the same time, there are many Buddhist stories that depict women in negative terms which continue to influence modern Buddhist views. Indian Buddhist views of women's sexuality are typical of ancient India, which saw women as inherently lustful creatures of passion, and who are often depicted as seductresses who are a danger to men seeking to live the celibate religious life. These negative attitudes towards women continue to influence contemporary Buddhist cultures, where it is widely believed that birth as a woman is due to bad karma. This is also said to influence the future of Buddhism. One story which illustrates this is that of the first nun, Mahapajapati Gotami, which includes a prediction that because the Buddha allowed the ordination of women as nuns, the Buddhist Dharma will decline faster.

In his White Bones Red Rot Black Snakes, Bhikkhu Sujato pointed out that the Jātakas were compiled by many people over a long time. Rather than representing a single, coherent Buddhist position regarding women, he argued that they represent multiple conflicting attitudes, an ambiguity which cannot be easily represented in the doctrinal or philosophical texts. One of the major cause of negative views of women is the confusion and tension around sexuality experienced by those who have chosen a renunciant life. While the early texts advise to deal with this through mindfulness and meditation, in the stories the tensions become externalized as negative characteristics of women. Such views should not be seen as fixed, however, since Buddhism is not essentialist. Negative characteristics of women—like negative characteristics of men, which are also depicted—are qualities to be overcome and transformed through spiritual development. Thus Buddhism has always insisted that women are equal to men in their capacity for awakening.

=== Animals ===
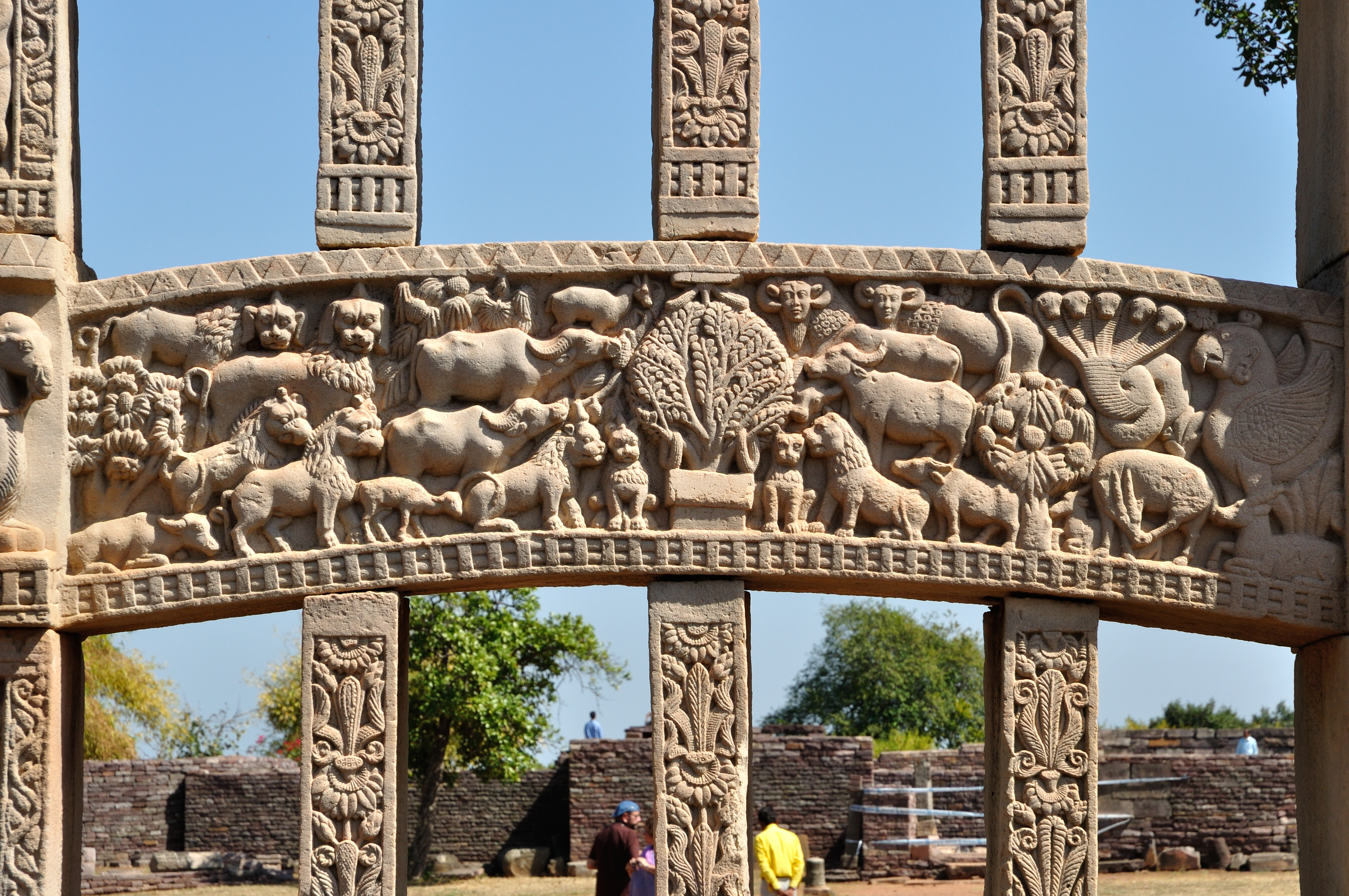
The Buddha, represented by the Bodhi tree, attended by animals, Sanchi vihara.

Animals feature prominently in Buddhist myths, whether domesticated beasts like the cow or the cat, or wild beasts such as the lion or crocodile. The Jātakas frequently feature talking animals and common fable tropes such as the donkey that clothes himself in a lion's skin. A distinctive feature of Buddhist tales, however, is that the ethical implications of such talking beasts are not dismissed. Instead, it is in dialogue with talking beasts that ethics of non-violence and restraint in killing animals are developed. In some Jātakas it is also common that an animal acts in a more moral manner than a human.

Several kinds of animals appear regularly enough that they assume the role of stock characters. The lion is strong and fearless, the jackal, his nemesis, is weak, craven, and duplicitous. Animals can also symbolically represent other Buddhist themes, the lion for example is said to represent the Buddha (who is also known as the "lion of the Sakya clan", Sakyasimha), since the lion is the king of the animals, with the loudest roar and the Buddha is the foremost of all humans with the most superior teaching. The deer represents renunciation, since it never sleeps in the same place. Mythical animals such as the Garuda and Nagas also play a part in Buddhist animal fables and myths.

=== Extraordinary beings ===
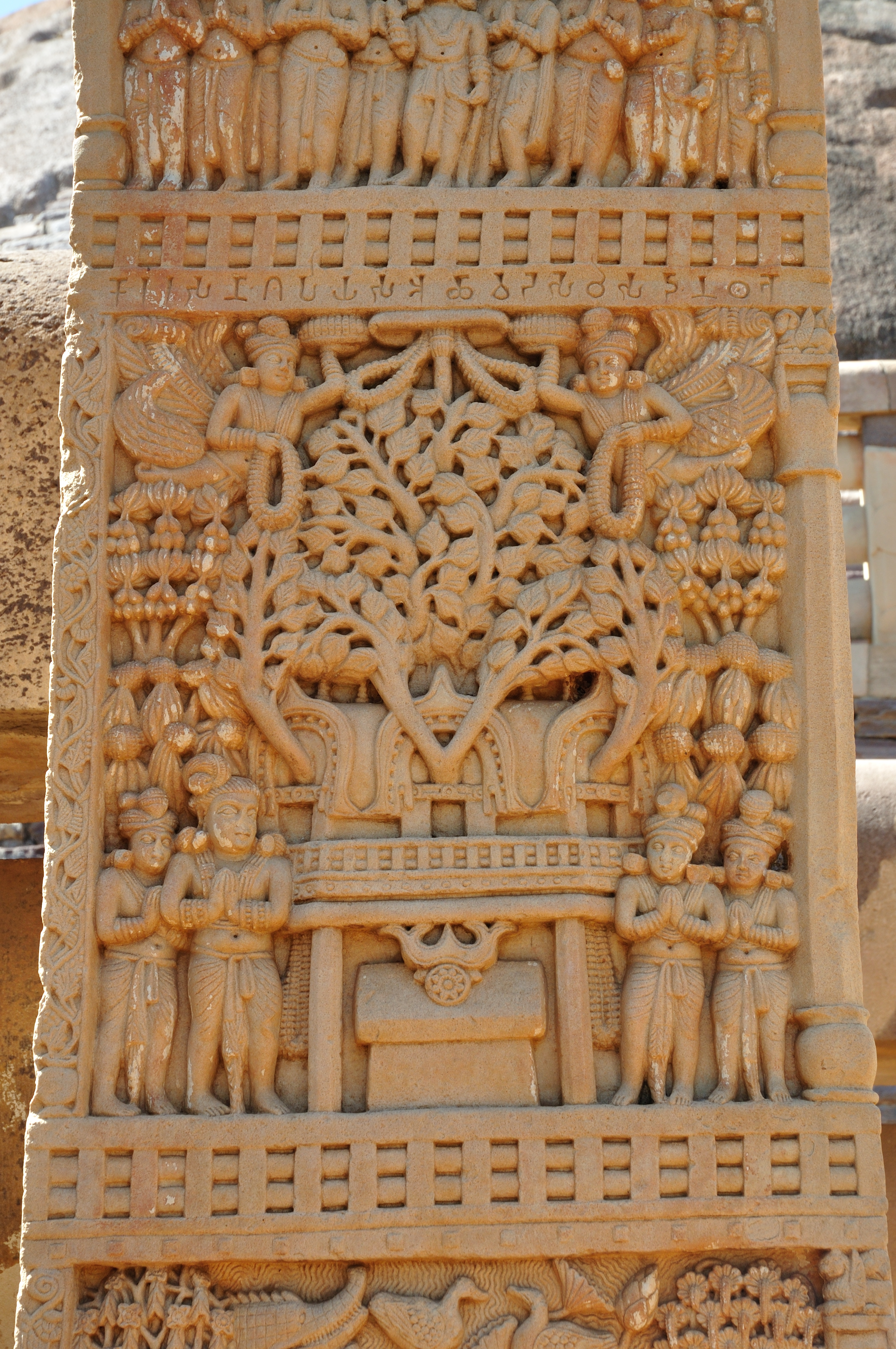
Worshipping the Bodhi Tree, East Face, South Pillar, East Gateway, Stupa 1, Sanchi

The Buddhist tradition shares with the wider Indian culture a range of extraordinary beings and places. Myth often deals with the supernatural. However, while Buddhist myth frequently deals with events normally regarded as supernatural, such as stories of devas, miracles, and so on, these are all seen as aspects of dharma, and thus as part of nature. In Buddhist context, then, it is best to describe these phenomena as “extraordinary”, in the sense of lying outside ordinary experience, rather than “supernatural”, being “above nature”.

Buddhist deities are an important element in all Buddhist mythologies. These deities include high level bodhisattvas who have extraordinary powers, cosmic Buddhas (in Mahayana), devas (heavenly beings who live for a very long time), nature spirits like Yakshas and fierce tantric deities or protectors.

Buddhist mythology also adopt Brahmanical myths and deities, frequently inverting motifs to illustrate a point of difference between Buddhism and orthodox Brahmanism. When the Indian creator deity Brahmā appears, he is sometimes depicted as a magnificent devotee of the Buddha, but sometimes he is mocked. Some Buddhist texts make fun of Brahma's belief that he is the creator of the universe. Likewise, the ferocious war god of the Vedas, Indra, is transformed into the gentle Sakka (usually given the epithet devanam indrah "king of the gods"), who is said to have reached his godly status through public works.

Buddhist saints and historical figures are also important in Buddhist myth. The stories of quasi-legendary figures such as Padmasambhava and Milarepa serve as important foundational myths for Tibetan Buddhist schools.

=== Symbols ===
In Buddhist literature as well as in Buddhist art, myth is also communicated using various Buddhist symbols which have become widespread across the Buddhist world. Among the earliest and most common symbols are the stupa (symbolizing the Buddha), the Dharma wheel (a symbol of the Dharma), the Bodhi Tree (and its leaves) and the lotus flower (both symbolizing awakening).

Buddhist cultures typically preserve relics or places that tie them with the Buddhism of the past, and especially with the historical Buddha. These things are given meaning by telling sacred stories about them.

In Sri Lanka, the most popular sites for pilgrimage are the Bodhi tree at Anuradhapura, and the tooth relic at Kandy. The Bodhi tree myth says that it was a sapling taken from the tree under which the Buddha sat, brought to Sri Lanka by King Ashoka's daughter, the enlightened bhikkhunī Saṅghamittā. Worship of the tooth relic is ultimately derived from the closing passages of the Mahāparinibbāna Sutta, which tell of the distribution of the Buddha's physical remains after his cremation.

=== Myth and ritual ===
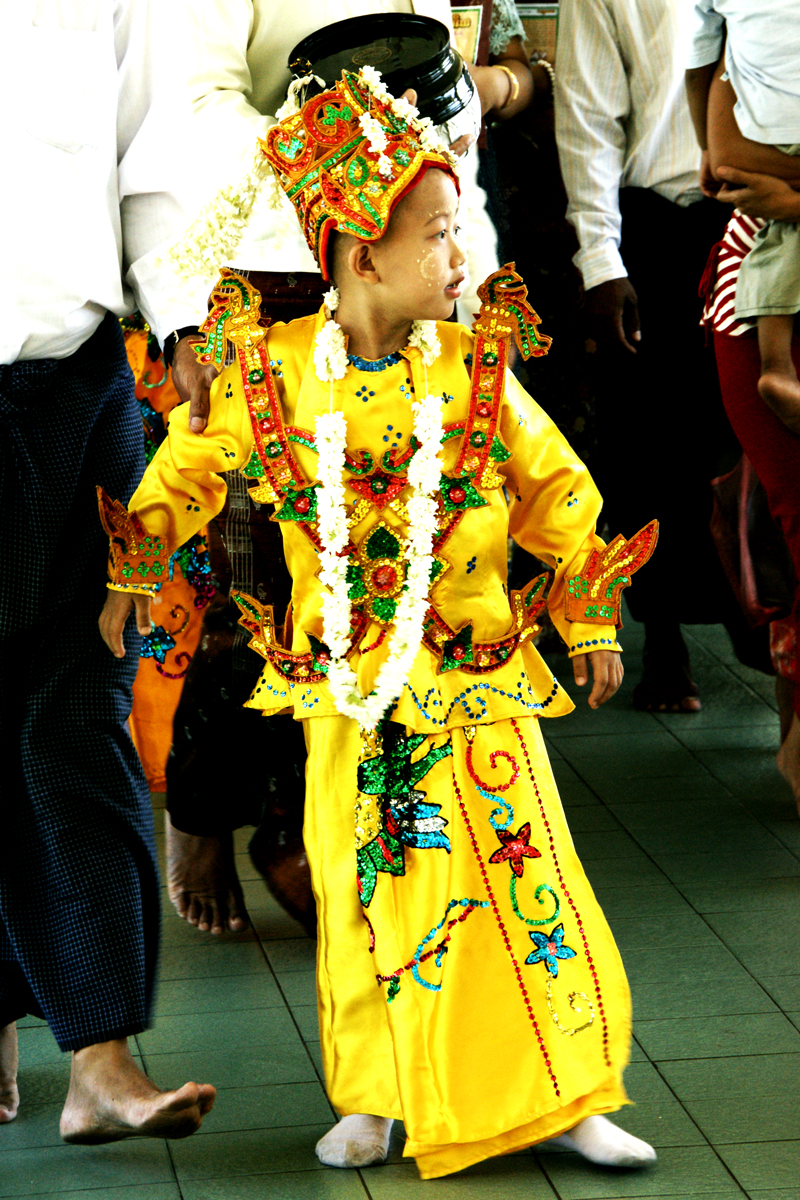
The royal outfit worn by novitiates-to-be before their samanera ordination.

It is common for mythic events to be performed or re-experienced as ritual, and in fact some myths arise as explanations of ritual. We find this frequently in Buddhism, as the ordination procedure mimics the renunciation of the Buddha. Although the Vinaya texts describing ordination depict it as a simple, almost bureaucratic, procedure, some Buddhist cultures have rituals in which they dress the candidate up like a prince and parade him through the streets in a reenactment of the renunciation of the Buddha. These rituals can be quite elaborate, with some candidates riding a while horse, and other individuals playing different roles such as the tempter Mara. In Myanmar, a parallel life passage ritual also exists for women, called a shinbyu ceremony.

Another Buddhist ritual which includes reenactments of the Buddha life myth is the ritual of the consecration of a Buddha image. Among other things, the statue's head is covered, symbolizing the Buddhas withdrawal from householder life and various symbolic offerings are placed before the statue. including a sweet milk rice mixture symbolizing the offering of Sujata.

In Tantric Buddhism, rituals such as tantric initiations and the creation of mandalas can be seen as recreations of Tantric Buddhist mythic reality in a sacred time.

== Interpretations ==
=== Emic interpretations ===
There is no developed tradition of myth interpretation within Buddhist traditions. Writers acknowledged that the various lives of the Buddha were similar, differing in only inconsequential details. The more spectacular aspects of Buddhist myth were likely treated for their entertainment value. Vasubandhu, writing around the 4th century CE, took it for granted that his audience understood that the so-called “guardians of hell” were in fact just projections of the mind. It is, however, not uncommon to find strictly literal interpretations of myth.

The reform movements in Buddhism that emerged around the end of the 19th century are known as Buddhist modernism. They are characterized by a rational approach to Buddhist ethics, philosophy, and meditation, and tend to reject or downplay mythic elements. As a result, many contemporary forms of Buddhism influenced by Buddhist modernism rarely pay much attention to myth or tend to downplay their importance, seeing them as later "accretions" or "distortions". Perhaps because of this, modern scholarly analyses of Buddhist mythology are rare.

Bhikkhu Sujato has written an extensive analysis of Buddhist myth, focusing on women. He shows the extensive correlations between Buddhist myths and broader world myth, drawing on such sources as Joseph Campbell and Erich Neumann, a student of Carl Jung.

=== Modern Etic interpretations ===
Joseph Campbell’s Hero’s Journey analyzed the Buddha's life myth as part of the universal hero's journey which he also compares to the life of Jesus, both being forms of what he saw as "an archetypal World Savior". Campbell mapped the life of the Buddha into what he saw as the standard formula for heroic myths: separation—initiation—return. Separation maps into the Buddha's renunciation, initiation into his quest for and attainment of awakening and return is his return to the world to preach the Dharma to all (and thus for Campbell, he is a "universal hero" who brings a message to the entire world).

Roberto Calasso in his Ka discusses Buddhist myth in the context of Indian myth more generally. He argues that the Buddha came to “put an end to gesture”, as his journey was ultimately inwards and dispensed with outward forms of spirituality such as ritual.

As Calasso sees it, the ancient world of sacrifice, of prohibition and authority, is ruined by the coming of the Buddha. The Buddha wishes to “eliminate the residue,” the leftovers from which everything new is generated (the pursuit of nirvana is nothing less than a wish to extinguish the residue of a lived life–rebirth). His doctrine prefigures our own world: “What would one day be called ‘the modern’ was, at least as far as its sharpest and most hidden point is concerned, a legacy of the Buddha. Seeing things as so many aggregates and dismantling them. . . . An arid, ferocious scholasticism. . . . Total lack of respect for any prohibition, any authority.”

David Adams Leeming in his Mythology: The Voyage of the Hero sees the Buddha's enlightenment as a culmination of the theme of the hero quest in which a hero seeks a goal such as immortality (note that amrita is actually a term for nirvana), specifically a related theme called the "withdrawal theme".

== Mythology in contemporary Buddhism ==
Hagiographies are one of the staple forms of literature in the Thai forest tradition. In Thailand, the primary example is the biography of Ajahn Mun Bhuridatta, the founding father, by one of his students, Ajahn Maha Boowa. The hagiography of Ajahn Mun has become a major modern legend in Thai Buddhism. It established many of the standard features of such biographies: accounts of struggles with sexual temptation, meeting with tigers and ghosts in the forest, and exciting tales of psychic or meditative prowess.

== See also ==
- Buddhist cosmology
- Buddhist deities
- Vedic mythology
- Hindu mythology
- Chinese mythology
- Japanese mythology
- Hindu deities
- Japanese Buddhist pantheon
