= Buddhavaṃsa =

Buddhist Text

- SuttaCentral; OpenTipitaka
- Type: Canonical text
- Parent: Khuddaka Nikāya
- Attribution: Bhāṇaka
- Aṭṭhakathā: Madhuratthavilāsinī (Buddhavaṁsa-aṭṭhakathā)
- Commentator: Buddhadatta
- Abbreviation: Bv

The Buddhavaṃsa (also known as the Chronicle of Buddhas) is a hagiographical Buddhist text which describes the life of Gautama Buddha and of the twenty-four Buddhas who preceded him and prophesied his attainment of Buddhahood. It is the fourteenth book of the Khuddaka Nikāya, which in turn is the fifth and last division of the Sutta Piṭaka. The Sutta Piṭaka is one of three piṭakas (main sections) which together constitute the Tipiṭaka, or Pāli Canon of Theravāda Buddhism.

Along with the Apadāna and the Cariyāpiṭaka, the Buddhavaṃsa is considered by most scholars to have been written during the 1st and 2nd century BCE, and is therefore a late addition to the Pāli Canon.

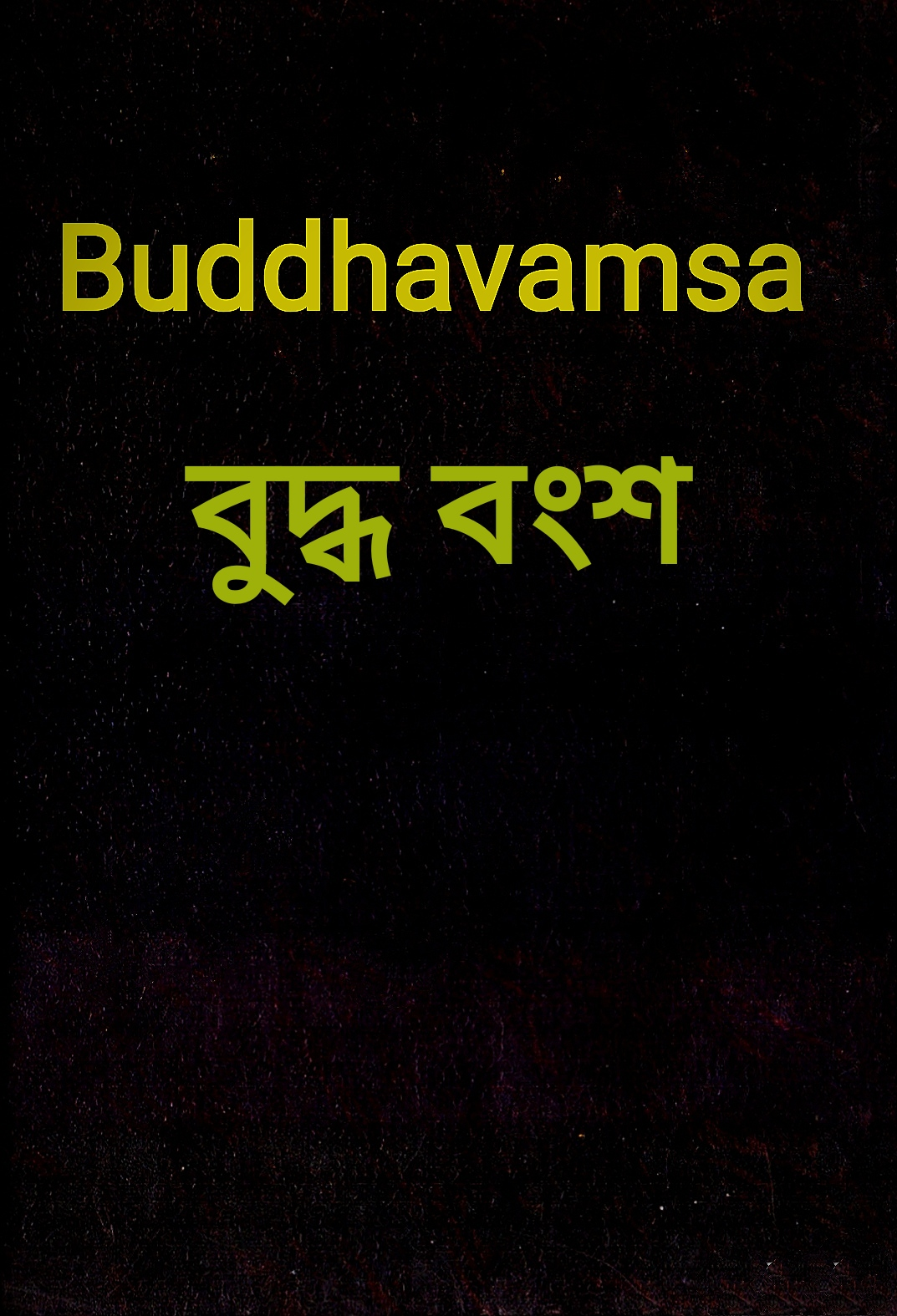
Buddhavamsa

== Summary ==
The first chapter tells how Gautama Buddha, to demonstrate his supernormal knowledge, creates a jewelled walkway in the sky. In seeing this display, Sāriputta asks the Buddha:

"Of what kind, great hero, supreme among men, was your resolve? At what time, wise one, was supreme Awakening aspired to by you? ... Of what kind, wise one, leader of the world, were your ten perfections? How were the higher perfections fulfilled, how the ultimate perfections?"

In response, the Buddha relays the remainder of the Buddhavaṃsa.

In the second chapter Gautama tells how in a distant past life as a layman named Sumedha, he received a prediction from Dīpankara Buddha that "In the next era you will become a buddha named Gotama.", and told him the ten perfections he would need to practice.

Chapters 3 through 26 are accounts of the twenty-four historical Buddhas who achieved Buddhahood between Dīpankara and Gautama, and the acts of merit that Gautama performed towards them in his previous lives.

Chapter 27 is an account of the life of Gautama Buddha.

Chapter 28 mentions three Buddhas that preceded Dīpankara, as well as the future Buddha, Maitreya.

Chapter 29 tells of the distribution of Gautama Buddha's relics after his death.

== The order of Buddhas in the Buddhist lineage ==
- 1 Dīpankara Buddha
- 2 Kondañña Buddha
- 3 Mangala Buddha
- 4 Sumana Buddha
- 5 Revata Buddha
- 6 Sobhita Buddha
- 7 Anomadassī Buddha
- 8 Padumuṭa Buddha
- 9 Narada Buddha
- 10 Padumuttara Buddha
- 11 Sumedha Buddha
- 12 Sujata Buddha
- 13 Piyadassī Buddha
- 14 Atthassī Buddha
- 15 Dhammadassī Buddha
- 16 Siddhattha Buddha
- 17 Tissa Buddha
- 18 Phussa Buddha
- 19 Vipassī Buddha
- 20 Sikhi Buddha
- 21 Vessabhu Buddha
- 22 Kakusandha Buddha
- 23 Konagamana Buddha
- 24 Kassapa Buddha
- 25 Gotama Buddha (The present Buddha)

== Translations ==
- Morris, R, ed. (1882). "XXVII: List of the Buddhas". The Buddhavamsa (PDF). London: Pali Text Society. pp. 66–7. Archived from the original on 2016-02-28.
- Law, BC, ed. (1938). "The lineage of the Buddhas". The Minor Anthologies of the Pali Canon: Buddhavaṃsa, the lineage of the Buddhas, and Cariyā-Piṭaka or the collection of ways of conduct (1st ed.). London: Milford.
- Takin, MV, ed. (1969). "The lineage of the Buddhas". The Genealogy of the Buddhas (1st ed.). Bombay: Bombay University Publications.
- Horner, IB, ed. (1975). The minor anthologies of the Pali canon. Volume III: Buddhavaṁsa (Chronicle of Buddhas) and Cariyāpiṭaka (Basket of Conduct). London: Pali Text Society. ISBN 0-86013-072-X.
- Vicittasarabivamsa, U (1992). "Chapter IX: The chronicle of twenty-four Buddhas". In Ko Lay, U; Tin Lwin, U (eds.). The great chronicle of Buddhas, Volume One, Part Two (PDF) (1st ed.). Yangon, Myanmar: Ti=Ni Publishing Center. pp. 130–321. Archived from the original on 2016-02-14.

== See also ==
- Cariyapitaka
- Jataka tales
- Pāramitā
