= Phussa =

Twenty-first of 28 Buddhas

Phussa Buddha
- Sanskrit: पुष्य; Puṣya
- Pāli: Phussa
- Burmese: ဖုဿဘုရား
- Chinese: 弗沙佛 (Pinyin: Fúshā Fó)
- Japanese: 弗沙仏(ふっしゃぶつ) (romaji: Fussha Butsu)
- Korean: 불사불 (RR: Bulsa Bul)
- Sinhala: ඵුස්ස බුදුන් වහන්සේ Phussa Budun Wahanse
- Thai: พระปุสสพุทธเจ้า; Phra Putsa Phutthachao
- Vietnamese: Phất Sa Phật

Information
- Venerated by: Theravada, Mahayana, Vajrayana

According to Theravada Buddhism's Pali canon's Buddhavamsa and its commentary, Phussa is the twenty-first of twenty-seven Buddhas who preceded the historical Gotama Buddha. He was also the second Buddha of the Maṇḍa kalpa.

In the Buddhavamsa, he is described as:

"Phussa Buddha removed the darkness, calmed the world and gave the Dhamma rain."

Phussa was 58 cubits, or 87 feet tall and was frequently compared with the sun and the moon.

== Biography ==
=== Birth and marriage ===
Phussa was born in Kāsika. His parents were King Jayasena and Queen Sirimā. He was married to princess Kisāgotamī and reigned for 9,000 years. After his son, Anupama was born, he decided to go practise asceticism.

=== Palaces and Renunciation ===
He resided in three palaces named Garuḷa, Haṃsa, and Suvaṇṇabhara before his renunciation, enjoying royal luxuries for nine thousand years. Upon witnessing four signs, he chose to the renounce worldly life by departing on an elephant, accompanied by ten million followers who also became ascetics.

=== Enlightenment ===
He practised asceticism for six months. After six months, he began to practise alone and become enlightened under the Maha Bodhi tree in the next morning. Prior to his enlightenment, Sirivaddhā, a merchant’s daughter, offered him milk-rice, while an ascetic named Sirivaddha provided grass for his meditation seat.

=== Parinirvana ===
Phussa lived for 90,000 years, liberating many living beings. He attained parinibbāna and died at Senārāma monastery. His death is described as:

This Buddha had taught many people and liberated countless beings. Now he died along with his disciples.

== Connection to Gautama Buddha ==
At Phussa's time, Gautama Buddha was a king named Vijitāvī. After listening to the teachings of Phussa, he gave away his possessions to become an ascetic. He could master the Pali canon. Phussa Buddha said "This king will become a Buddha named Gotama after 92 kalpas" meaning that Vijitāvī would become a Buddha named Gotama after 92 kalpas.

The incarnation of Gotama Buddha, having his wish granted, extended his practices as a Bodhisattva and became a god at Brahma realm.
