= Tissa Buddha =

Twentieth of twenty-eight buddhas

- Sanskrit: Tiṣya
- Pāli: Tissa
- Burmese: တိဿဘုရား
- Chinese: 提舍佛
- Sinhala: තිස්ස බුදුන් වහන්සේ Tissa Budun Wahanse
- Vietnamese: Đề Sa Phật

Information
- Venerated by: Theravada, Mahayana, Vajrayana

According to the Buddhavamsa of the Pali Canon and to its commentary, Tissa Buddha is the twentieth of the twenty-seven buddhas who preceded the historical Gotama Buddha. He was also the first buddha of the Maṇḍa kalpa which was formed 92 aeons ago.

In the Buddhavamsa, he is described as:

He has the most unique attributes, Śīla and integrity. Having reached the top of the Dhamma, he preached the wheel of the Dhamma.

His body was 60 cubits (90 feet) tall and people saw him as the Himalayas.

== Biography ==
=== From Birth to Enlightenment ===
Prince Tissa was born in Khemaka. His parents were King Janasandha and Queen Padumā. He was married to Queen Subhaddā and lived in his household for 7,000 years. After seeing the four sights, he decided to leave the palace. When his son, Ānanda was born, he left the palace. Ten million men followed him to become ascetics. He practised austerities for eight months. After the eight months, he began to practise alone and became enlightened under the Pterocarpus tree.

=== Gotama Buddha getting the omen ===
In Tissa Buddha's time, Gotama Buddha was a king named Sujāta who was ruling Yasavatī. Before Tissa Buddha was enlightened, King Sujāta gave away his possessions and became a Brahmin. When the Brahmin heard about the enlightenment of the Buddha, he wanted to see him. He picked a basket of flowers from the desire realm and donated to him. Also, he made an umbrella made of ruby and gold, and protected him against the sunlight. As the Buddha appreciated the brahmin's work, he gave the omen:

This brahmin will become the buddha named Gotama after 92 aeons.

After hearing the omen, the incarnation of Gotama Buddha begin to practise further.

=== Parinirvana ===
Tissa Buddha lived for 100,000 years. He died at Nandārāma monastery. In the Buddhavamsa, his death is described as:

Like the clouds blown by the wind, the snow melted by the heat of the sun and the darkness lightened by a candle, he died along with his disciples

His stupa was built in the same monastery and it was 3 yojanas high.

== Tissa as the future Buddha ==
According to the Anāgatavamsa (Meaning: The Chronicles of the Future), Tissa Buddha is the ninth of the ten future buddhas that will succeed Gotama Buddha.

In Gotama Buddha's time, he was an elephant named Nāḷāgiri (Danapāla) that was used by Devadatta to murder Gotama Buddha. The buddha soothed him and told him to follow the Five precepts.
