= Bodhi tree =

Sacred fig tree in Bodh Gaya, Bihar, India

Coordinates: 24°41′45.29″N 84°59′29.29″E

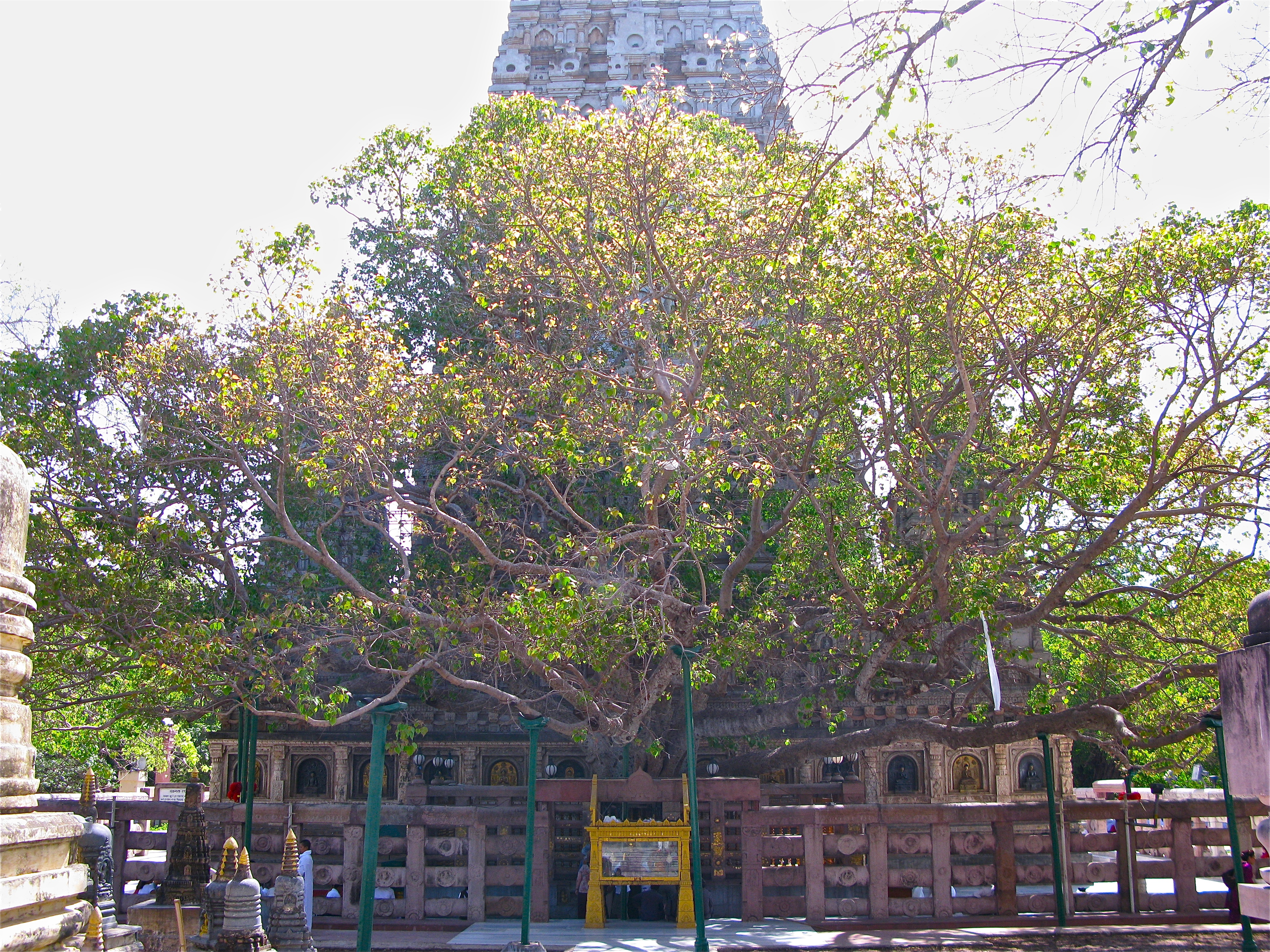
The Mahabodhi tree at the Mahabodhi Temple in Bodh Gaya

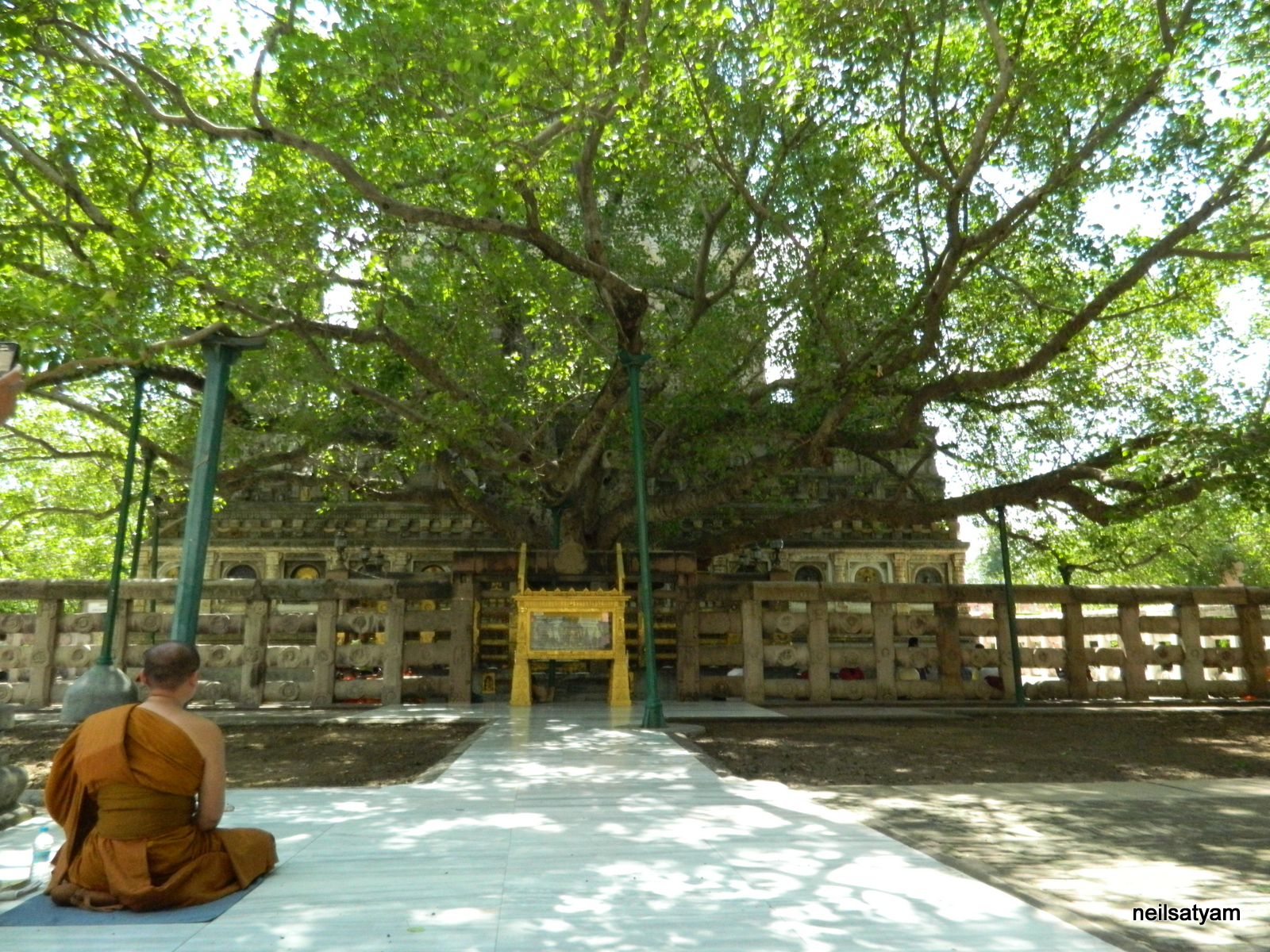
A Buddhist monk in front of the Mahabodhi tree

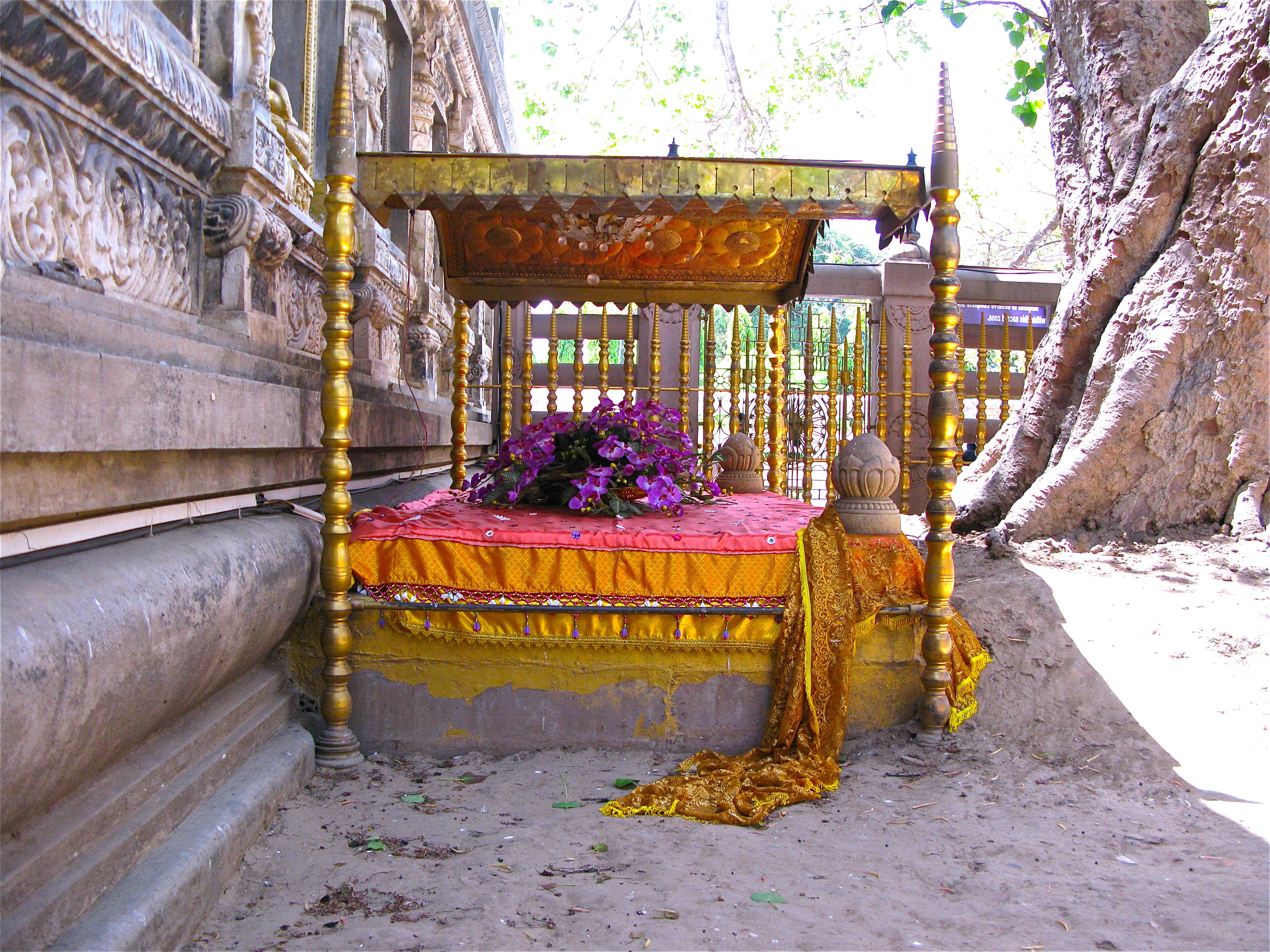
The Diamond throne, or Vajrashila, at the spot where the Buddha is said to have sat under the Bodhi tree in Bodh Gaya

The Bodhi tree (Sanskrit and Pāli: Bodhi meaning "awakening" or "enlightenment") is the specific Bo tree (from the Sinhala bo, derived from bodhi)—a sacred fig (Ficus religiosa)—located within the Buddhist Mahabodhi Temple, a UNESCO World Heritage Site, in Bodh Gaya, Bihar, India. According to Buddhist tradition, it was under a Bo tree located at this site that Siddhartha Gautama, the spiritual teacher who later became known as Gautama Buddha, or simply the Buddha, attained enlightenment, or Buddhahood, around the 5th century BCE. In Buddhist art and iconography, the Bodhi tree is commonly depicted with its characteristic heart-shaped leaves, a feature of Ficus religiosa that has come to symbolize wisdom and spiritual awakening.

The original tree no longer survives, but its descendants have been venerated for more than two millennia. Over the centuries, the tree and its successors have undergone many episodes of destruction and renewal. Notable recorded incidents include its felling during the reign of Emperor Aśoka (c. 268–232 BCE), its destruction by Queen Tissarakkhā around 254 BCE, its damage or destruction during the persecution of Buddhism under King Puṣyamitra Śuṅga in the 2nd century BCE, and its later cutting down by King Śaśāṅka of Gauda around 600 CE. Each time, it was replanted from surviving saplings.

A sapling from the original Bodhi tree was sent to Sri Lanka by Emperor Aśoka, with his daughter Sanghamittā Therī, in 288 BCE, and planted at Anuradhapura, where it survives today as the Jaya Sri Maha Bodhi—regarded as the oldest living human-planted tree with a known date. The current Bodhi tree at Bodh Gaya, planted in 1881 by British archaeologist Alexander Cunningham from a cutting of the Sri Lankan tree, continues to be one of the most revered pilgrimage sites in Buddhism.

== Origin and descendants ==
=== Bodh Gaya ===
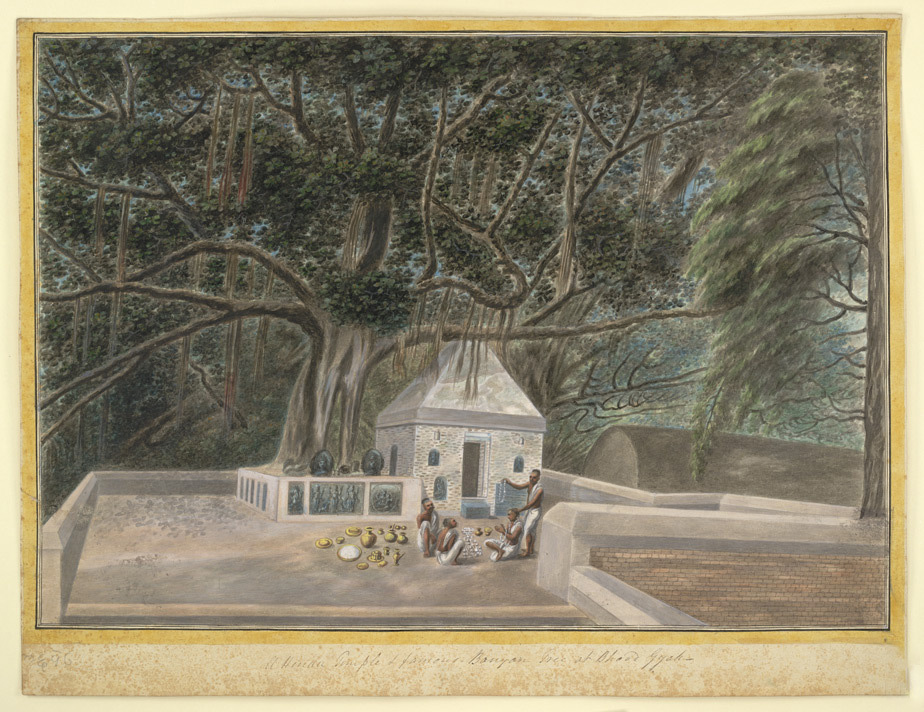
1810 picture of a small temple beneath the Mahabodhi tree, Bodh Gaya

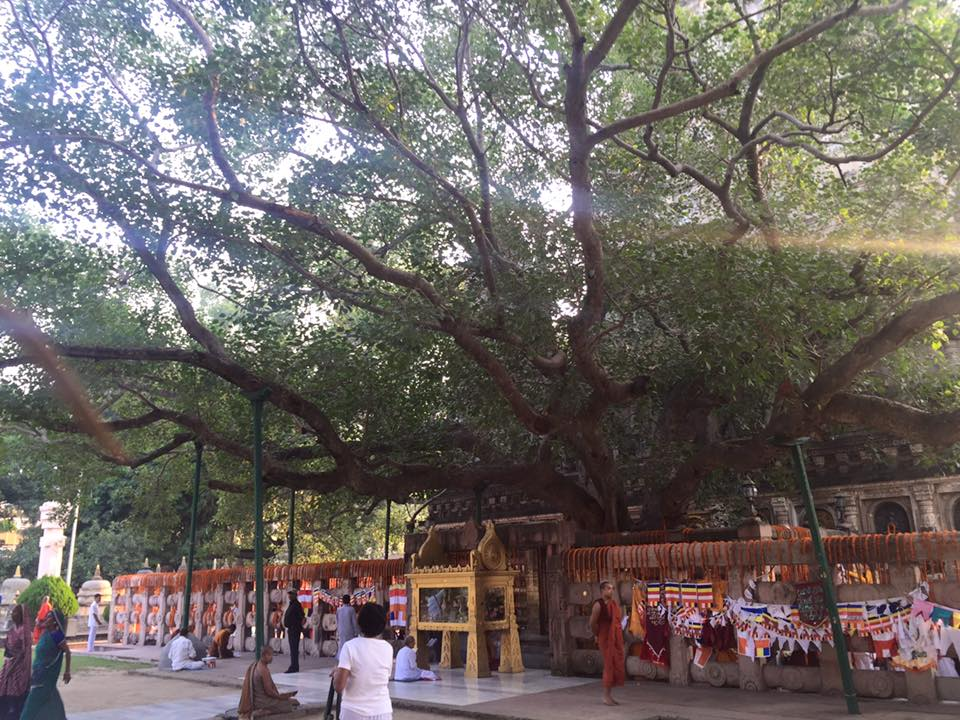
The Mahabodhi tree at Bodh Gaya in 2015

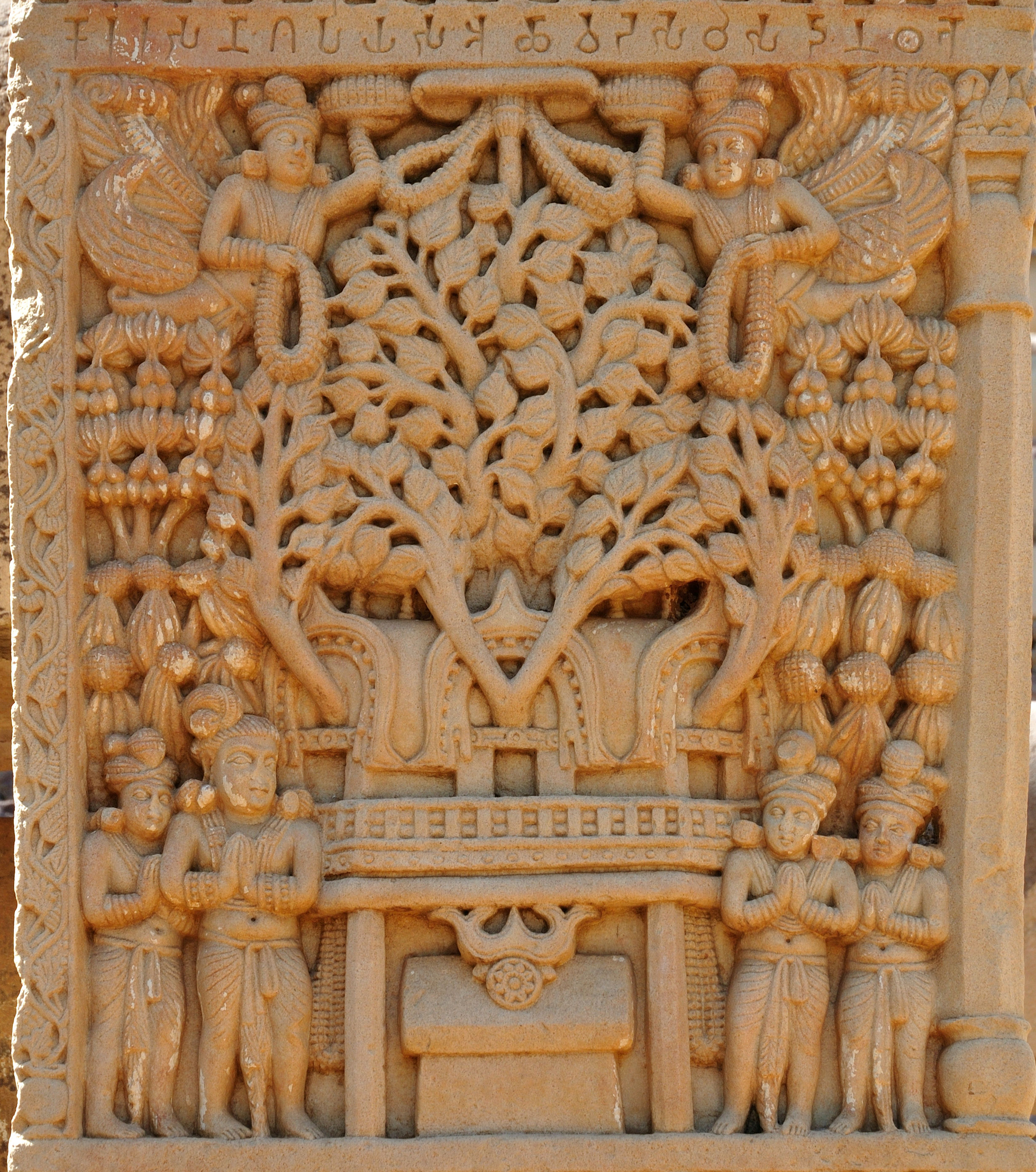
Illustration of the temple commissioned by Asoka at Bodh Gaya around the Bodhi tree. Sculpture of the Satavahana period at Sanchi, 1st century CE.

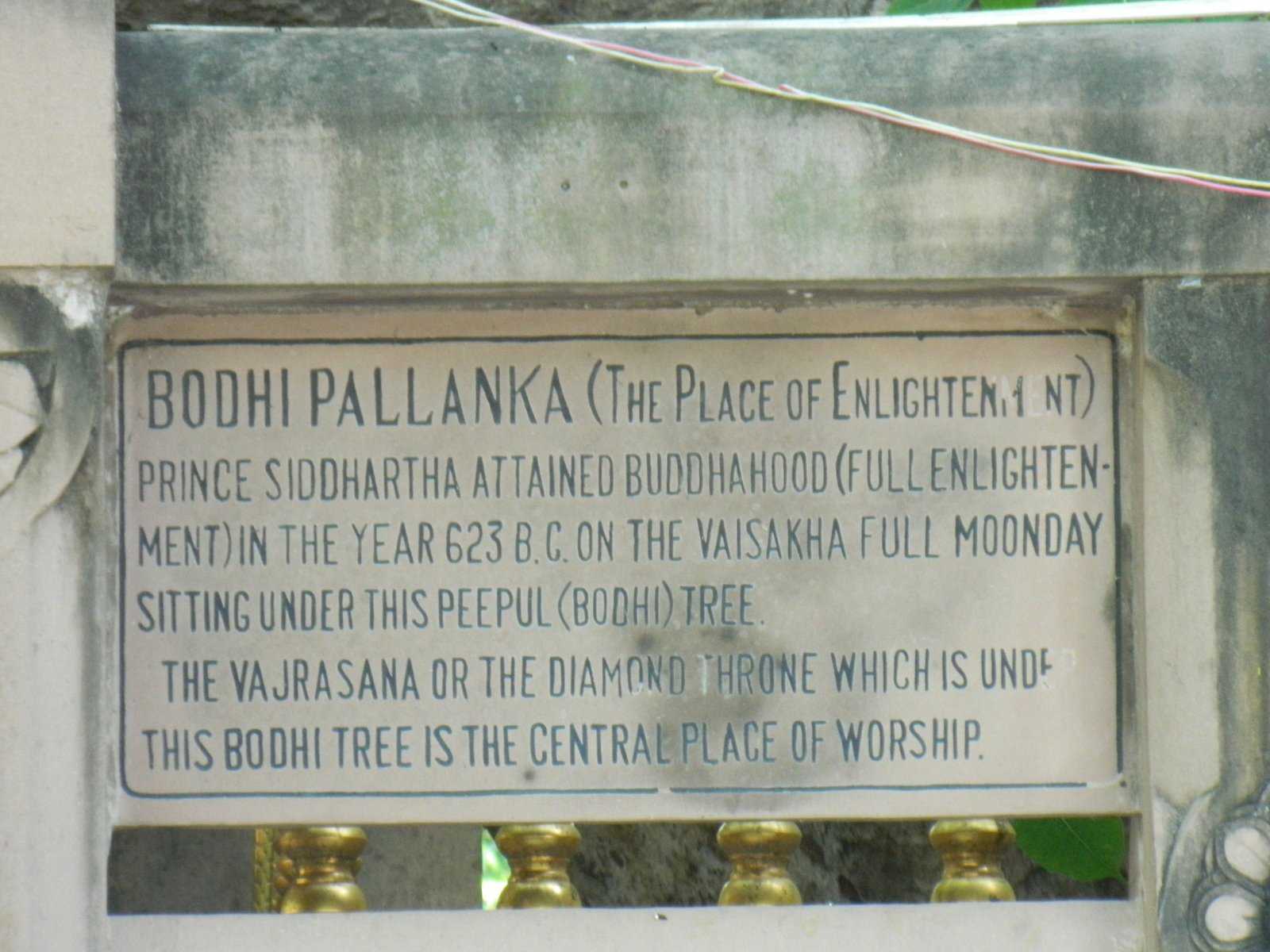
Bodhi tree sign, 2013

The Bodhi tree at the Mahabodhi Temple—revered as the Sri Maha Bodhi—marks the sacred site where Gautama Buddha is said to have attained enlightenment (bodhi) while meditating beneath its branches. According to Buddhist texts, around 528 BCE, Gautama seated himself beneath a Ficus religiosa at Uruvela (present-day Bodh Gaya, India). Resolving not to rise until he had realized the ultimate truth, he entered a state of profound meditation. After that night, he attained Sambodhi (full enlightenment), thereby becoming the Buddha—the "Awakened One".

The spot was used as a shrine even during the Buddha's lifetime. Emperor Ashoka, a devoted patron of Buddhism, visited Bodh Gaya about two centuries later and built a stone balustrade and temple complex around the sacred tree, establishing the Mahabodhi Temple that stands there today. His queen, Tissarakkhā, was jealous of the tree, and three years after she became queen (in the nineteenth year of Ashoka's reign), she ordered it to be killed. Every time the tree was destroyed, however, a new one was planted in the same place, and a monastery was constructed at the Enlightenment Throne of the Buddha. The monastery was called Bodhimanda Vihara (bodhimaṇḍa refers to a "seat of awakening", while vihāra is a Buddhist temple).

In 1862, the British archaeologist Alexander Cunningham wrote of the site as the first entry in the first volume published by the Archaeological Survey of India:

The celebrated Bodhi tree still exists, but is very much decayed; one large stem, with three branches to the westward, is still green, but the other branches are barkless and rotten. The green branch perhaps belongs to some younger tree, as there are numerous stems of apparently different trees clustered together. The tree must have been renewed frequently, as the present Pipal is standing on a terrace at least 30 feet above the level of the surrounding country. It was in full vigour in 1811, when seen by Dr. Buchanan (Hamilton), who describes it as in all probability not exceeding 100 years of age.

However, the tree decayed further, and in 1876, what remained of it was destroyed in a storm. Cunningham wrote that the young scion of the parent tree was already in existence to take its place.

Since 2007, the Forest Research Institute of India has assisted in the upkeep of the Mahabodhi tree. Various measures have been taken to protect the health of the tree, and cloning was considered in 2008.

=== Jetavana, Uttar Pradesh ===
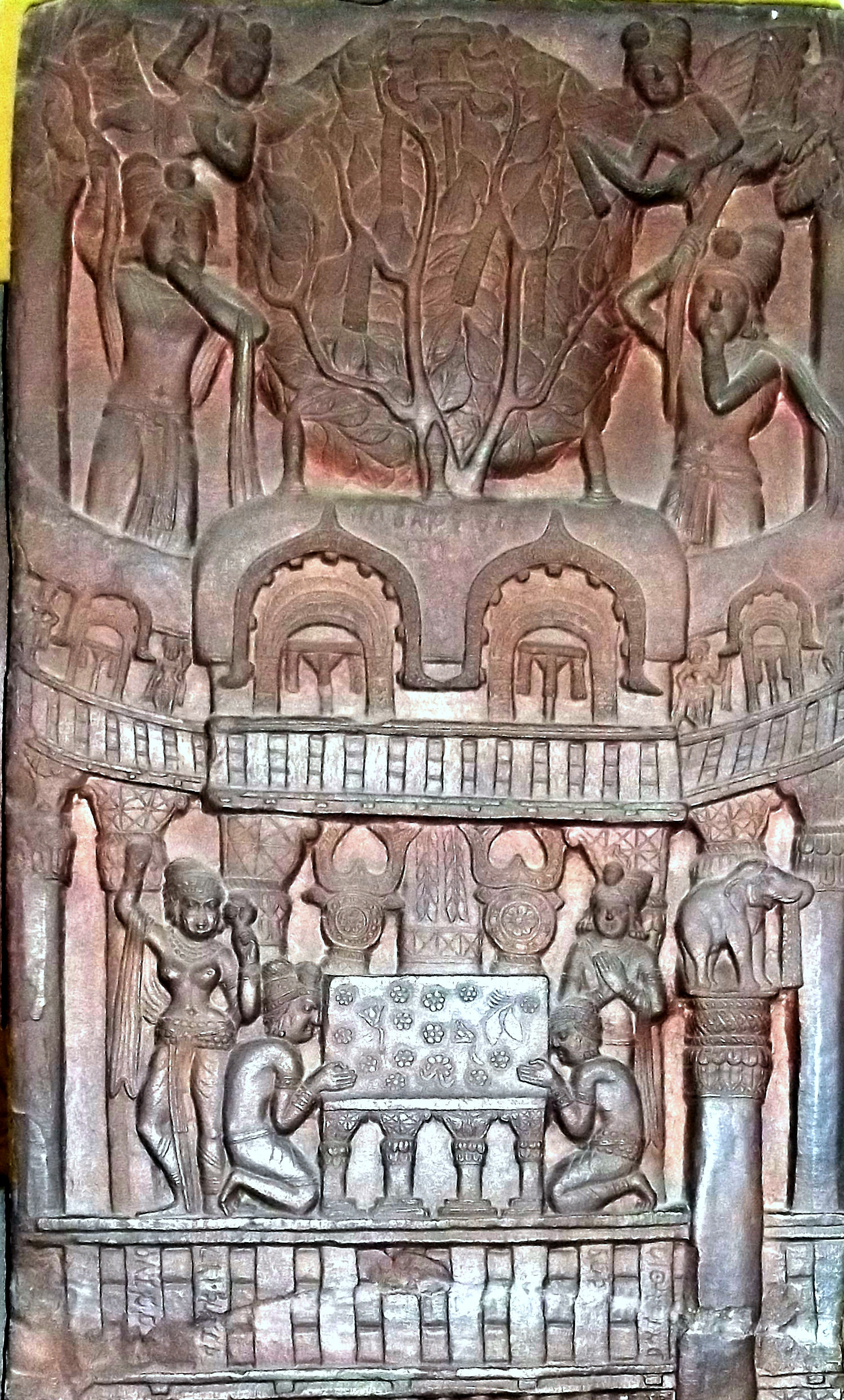
Ashoka's Mahabodhi Temple and Diamond throne in Bodh Gaya, built circa 250 BCE. The inscription between the chaitya arches reads: "Bhagavato Sakamunino/ bodho", meaning "the building round the Bodhi tree of the Holy Sakamuni". Bharhut frieze (circa 100 BCE).

It is said that in the ancient Buddhist texts, in order for people to make offerings in the name of the Buddha when he was away on pilgrimage, the Buddha sanctioned the planting of a seed from the Bodhi tree in Bodh Gaya in front of the gateway of Jetavana Monastery, near Sravasti. For this purpose, Moggallana took a fruit from the tree as it dropped from its stalk, before it reached the ground. It was planted in a golden jar by Anathapindika, with great pomp and ceremony. A sapling immediately sprouted forth, fifty cubits high, and in order to consecrate it, the Buddha spent one night under it in meditation. This tree, because it was planted under the direction of Ananda, came to be known as the Ananda Bodhi.

=== Anuradhapura, Sri Lanka ===
King Ashoka's daughter Sanghamittā Theri brought a piece of the tree with her to Ceylon, where it continues to grow in the island's ancient capital of Anuradhapura. It is named Jaya Sri Maha Bodhi. According to the Mahāvaṃsa, Jaya Sri Maha Bodhi was planted in 288 BCE, making it the oldest verified specimen of any angiosperm. In this year (the twelfth year of King Ashoka's reign), the right branch of the Bodhi tree was brought by Sanghamittā to Anurādhapura and placed by the left foot of Devanampiya Tissa. The Buddha, on his deathbed, had resolved five things, one being that the branch to be taken to Ceylon should detach itself. From Bodh Gayā, the branch was taken to Pātaliputta and thence to Tāmalittī, where it was placed on a ship and taken across the sea. It finally arrived at Anuradhapura, staying on the way at Tivakka.

=== Honolulu, Hawaii ===
In 1913, Anagarika Dharmapala took a sapling of Jaya Sri Maha Bodhi to Hawaii, where he presented it to his benefactor, Mary E. Foster, who had funded much Buddhist missionary work. She planted it in the grounds of her house in Honolulu, by the Nuʻuanu stream. On her death, she left her house and its grounds to the people of Honolulu, and it became the Foster Botanical Garden.

=== Chennai, India ===
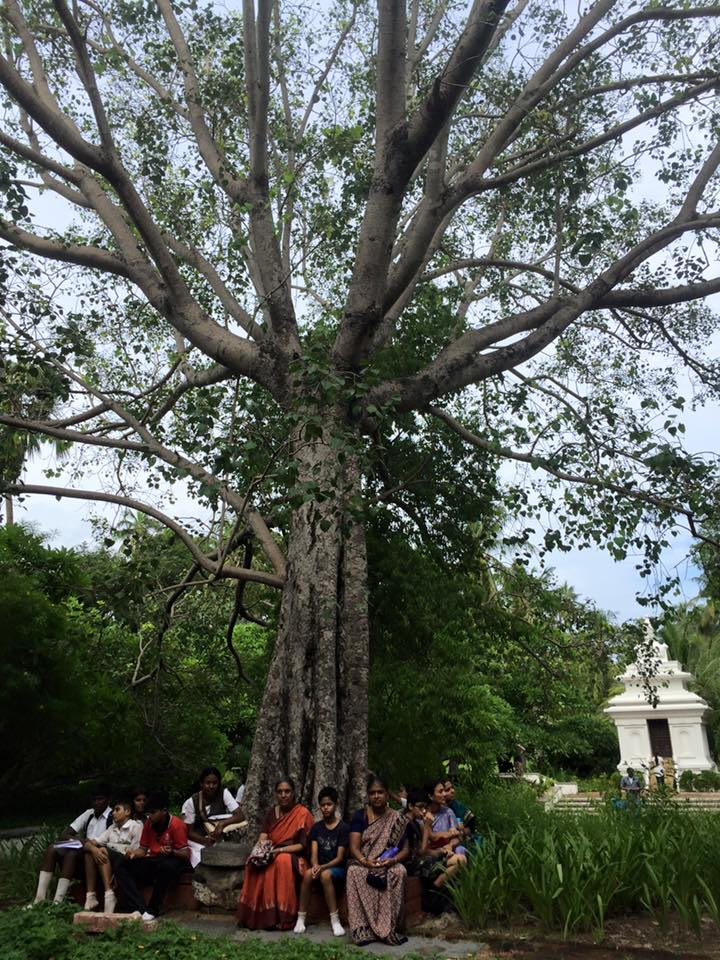
Sapling of the Maha bodhi tree planted in the year 1950 at the Theosophical Society Adyar

In 1950, Jinarajadasa took three saplings of the Sri Maha Bodhi to plant two in Chennai, India: one near the Buddhist temple at the Theosophical Society and the other at the riverside of Adyar Creek. The third sapling was planted near a meditation center in Sri Lanka.

=== Trấn Quốc, Hanoi, Vietnam ===
In 1959, to mark a visit to Vietnam by the first president of India, Rajendra Prasad, a cutting of the original tree in Bodh Gaya was gifted, and it presently stands on the grounds of Trấn Quốc Pagoda in Hanoi.

=== Thousand Oaks, California ===
In 2012, the Bangladeshi philanthropist Brahmanda Pratap Barua took a sapling of the Bodhi tree from Bodh Gaya, to Thousand Oaks, California, where he presented it to his benefactor, Anagarika Glenn Hughes, who had funded much Buddhist work and teaches Buddhism in the United States.

=== Nihon-ji, Japan ===
In 1989, the government of India presented the temple of Nihon-ji with a sapling from the Bodhi tree as a gesture of world peace.

=== Deekshabhoomi, Nagpur, India ===
A Bodhi tree was planted at the Deekshabhoomi Buddhist monument in Nagpur, India, from three branches of the Bodhi tree at Anuradhapura in Sri Lanka. Bhadant Anand Kausalyayan brought the branches from Sri Lanka as a memorial of Buddha's enlightenment. The site is holy to Navayana Buddhism, as it is the place where the Indian political leader B. R. Ambedkar converted to Buddhism, along with 600,000 followers, on 14 October 1956, during the Dhammachakra Pravartan Din festival.

=== Quezon City, Philippines ===
A sapling of the Bodhi tree from Anuradhapura was planted on 15 May 2011 at Wisdom Park in New Manila, Quezon City, Philippines, by D. M. Jayaratne, Prime Minister of Sri Lanka, and Mariano S. Yupitun, founder of Universal Wisdom Foundation Inc.

=== Bendigo, Victoria, Australia ===
A sapling of the Jaya Sri Maha Bodhi tree was sent in 2022 to the Great Stupa of Universal Compassion, the largest stupa in the Western world, near Bendigo in central Victoria, Australia.

=== Brisbane, Queensland, Australia ===
A sapling of the Bodhi tree from Anuradhapura was planted in April 2008 at Kurilpa Point, the site of the Queensland Art Gallery and Gallery of Modern Art, by the artist Lee Mingwei, as the centerpiece to his "Bhodi Tree Project".

=== Brazil ===
There are two descendants of the Bodhi tree in Brazil: one in the Busshinji temple, the head temple of Sōtō in Latin America, in São Paulo, and another in the Sōtō temple Daissenji, in Florianópolis.

=== South Korea ===
A sapling from the Mahabodhi tree in Bodh Gaya was given to South Korea in 2022 as a symbol of friendship between the two countries. It was planned to eventually be planted at a Buddhist temple.

=== Mahabodhi trees of other Buddhas ===
Following is a list of the various Mahabodhi trees under which all of the Buddhas known to Theravada Buddhism attained buddhahood:

Buddha (Pāli name)	Bodhirukka (tree of enlightenment; Pāli name)	binomial name
Taṇhaṅkara	rukkaththana	Alstonia scholaris
Medhaṅkara	kaela	Butea monosperma
Saraṇaṅkara	pulila	Dolichandrone spathacea
Dīpaṃkara	pipphali	Ficus obtusifolia
Koṇḍañña	salakalyanīka	
Maṅgala	nāga	Mesua ferrea
Sumana	nāga	Mesua ferrea
Revata	nāga	Mesua ferrea
Sobhita	nāga	Mesua ferrea
Anomadassi	ajjuna	Terminalia arjuna
Paduma	mahāsona	Oroxylum indicum
Nārada	mahāsona	Oroxylum indicum
Padumuttara	salala	Pinus roxburghii
Sumedha	mahanīpa	Neolamarckia cadamba
Sujāta	mahavelu	Bambusa bambos
Piyadassi	kakudha	Crateva religiosa
Atthadassi	campaka	Magnolia champaca
Dhammadassī	bimbijala	Pavetta indica
Siddhattha	kanikara	Pterospermum acerifolium
Tissa	asana	Terminalia elliptica
Phussa	amakala	Phyllanthus emblica
Vipassī	pāṭalī	Stereospermum chelonoides
Sikhī	puṇḍarīka	Mangifera indica
Vessabhū	sāla	Shorea robusta
Kakusandha	sirīsa	Albizia lebbeck
Koṇāgamana	uḍumbara	Ficus racemosa
Kassapa	nigrodha	Ficus benghalensis
Gautama Buddha (present Buddha)	assattha	Ficus religiosa
Metteyya (future Buddha)	nāga	Mesua ferrea

== Bodhi Day ==
On 8 December, Bodhi Day celebrates Buddha's enlightenment underneath the Bodhi tree. Those who follow the Dharma greet each other by saying, "Budu saranai!", which translates to "may the peace of the Buddha be yours". It is generally seen as a religious holiday, much like Christmas in the Christian West, in which special meals are served, especially cookies shaped like hearts (referencing the heart-shaped leaves of the Bodhi) and kheer, the Buddha's first meal ending his six-year asceticism.

== Bodhi tree and Bihar emblem ==
The Bodhi tree is the main part of the Bihar state emblem. During British rule, the State Reorganisation Act of 1935 adopted the Bodhi tree as the state emblem, following a recommendation to that effect being forwarded to the Royal Society.

== Bodhi puja ==
Bodhi puja, meaning "veneration of the Bodhi tree", is a ritual to worship the Bodhi tree and the deity residing in it (Pali: rukkhadevata; Sanskrit: vrikshadevata).

== Gallery ==
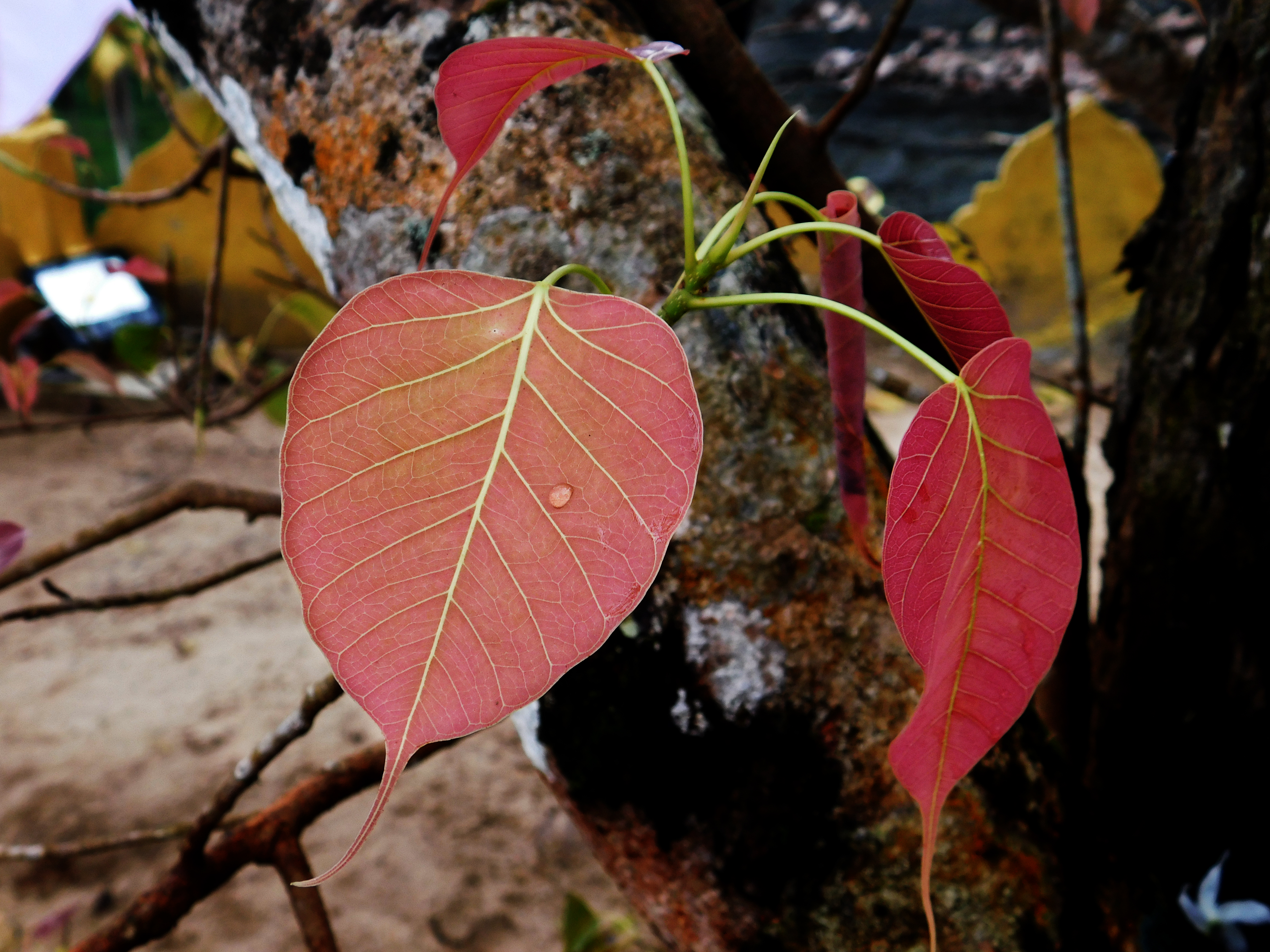
A Bodhi tree leaf with a raindrop

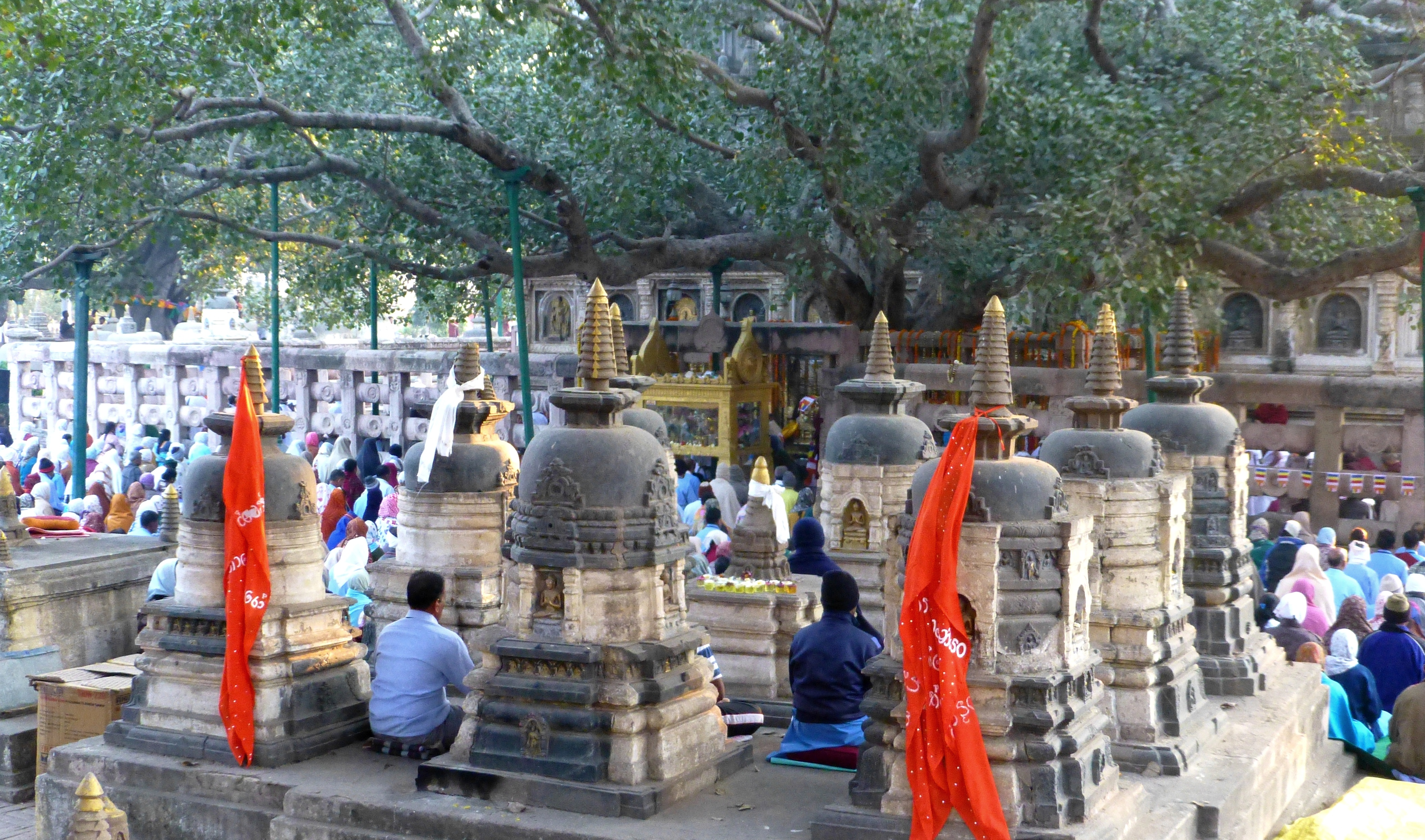
Meditators at the Mahabodhi tree, Bodh Gaya

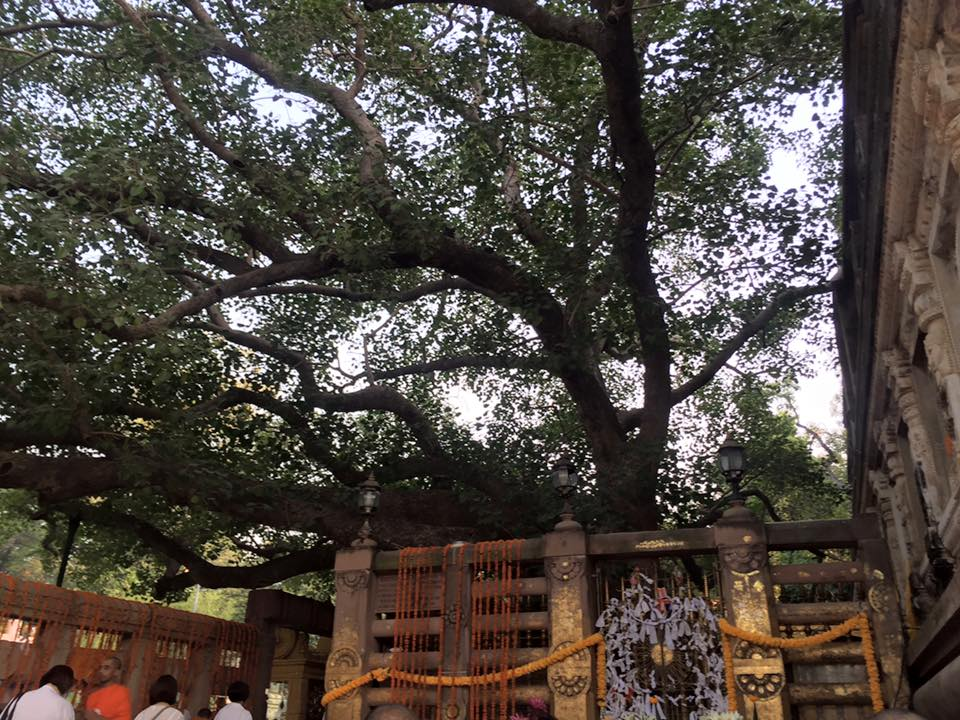
Mahabodhi tree, Bodh Gaya

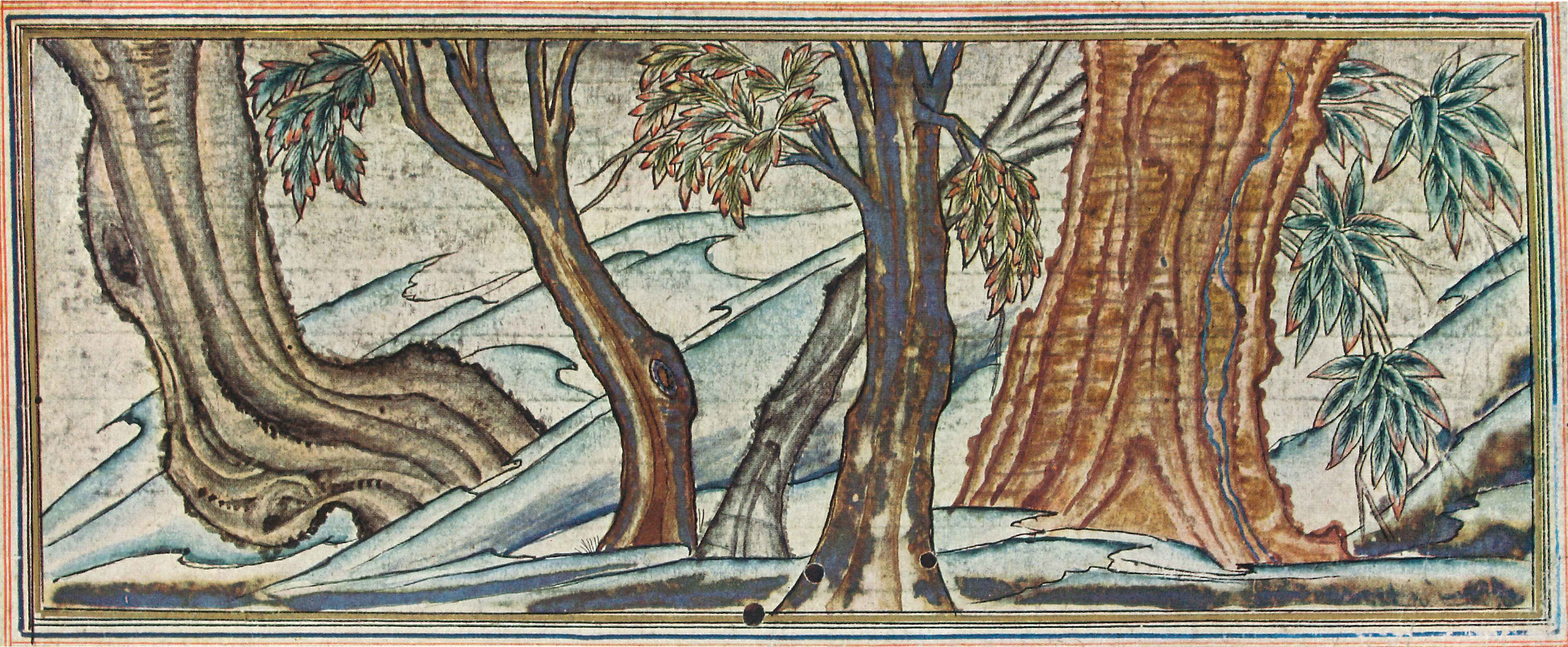
"The sacred tree of Buddha". A photo from the Jami' al-tawarikh by Rasheed al-Din Al-Hamazani, Folio 47 Recto. Collection of the Royal Asian Society in London. Rab-i-Rashidi 1314.

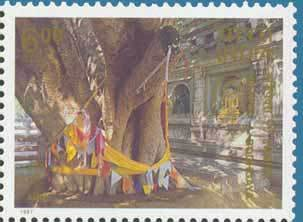
Indian stamp, 1997 – Colnect 163602 – Bodhi tree

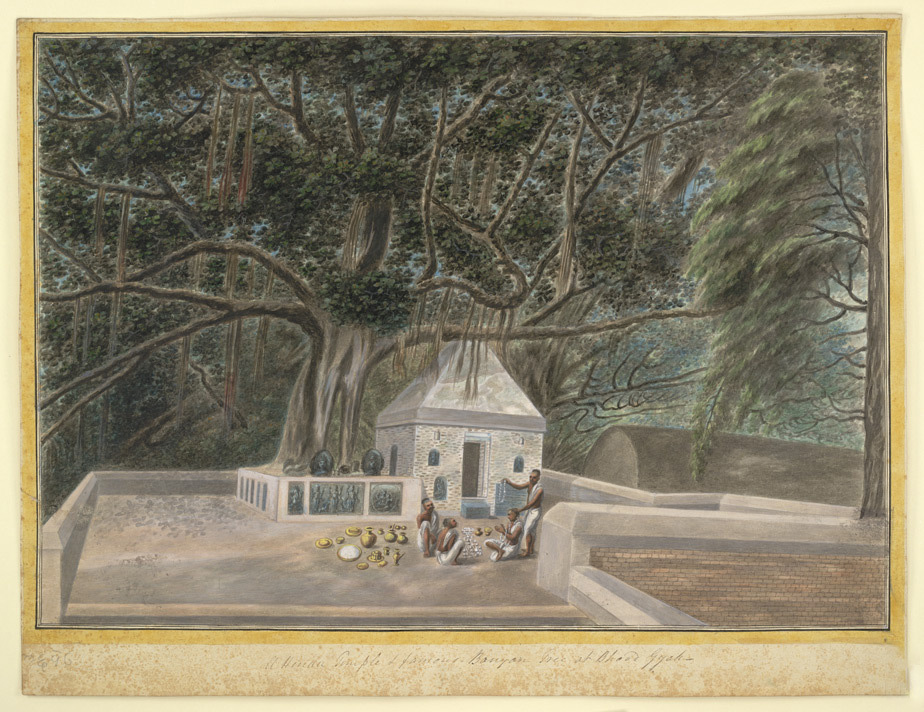
A small temple beneath the Bodhi tree, Bodh Gaya, c. 1810

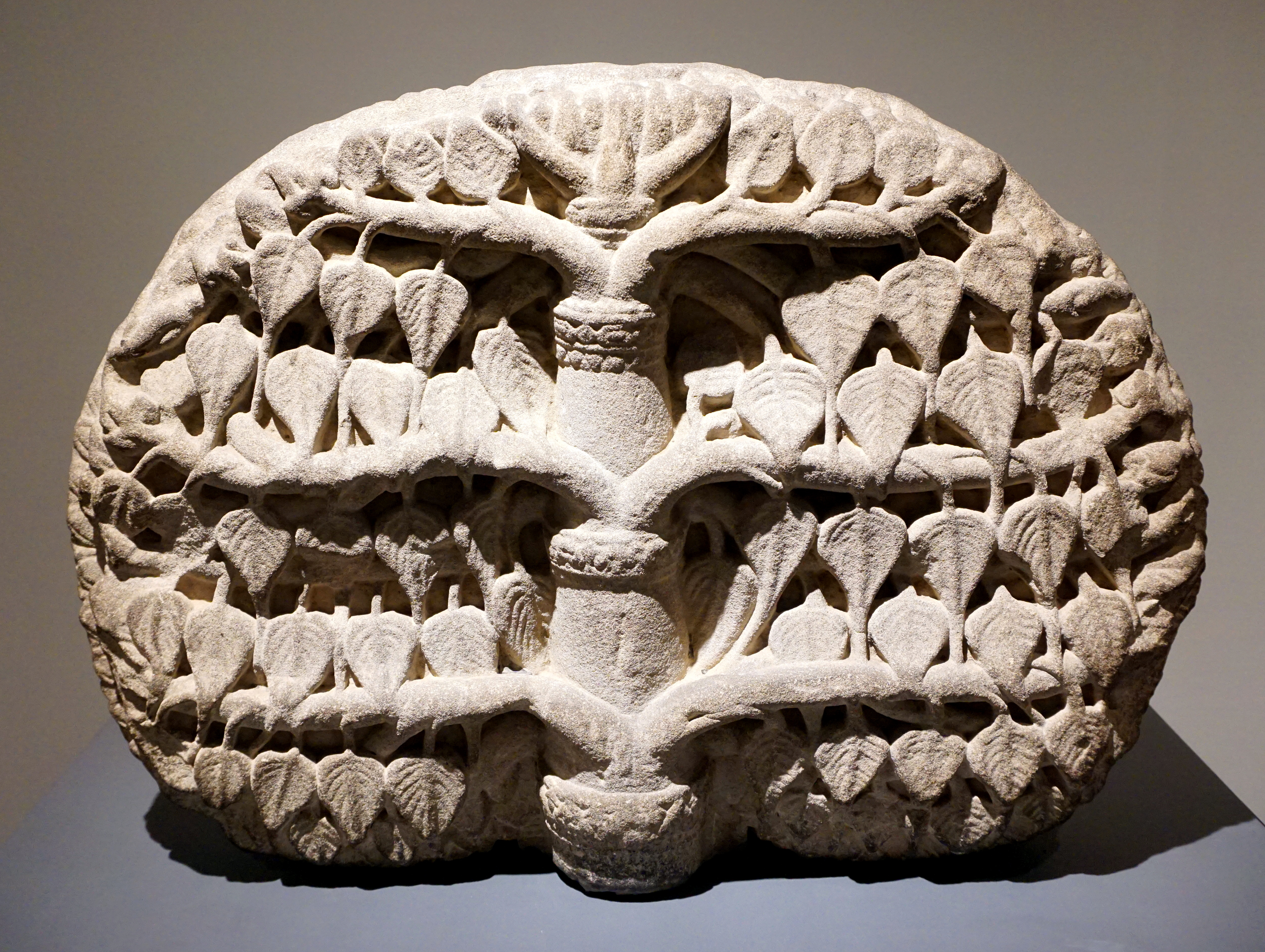
Bodhi tree photograph from the Bangkok National Museum, Thailand

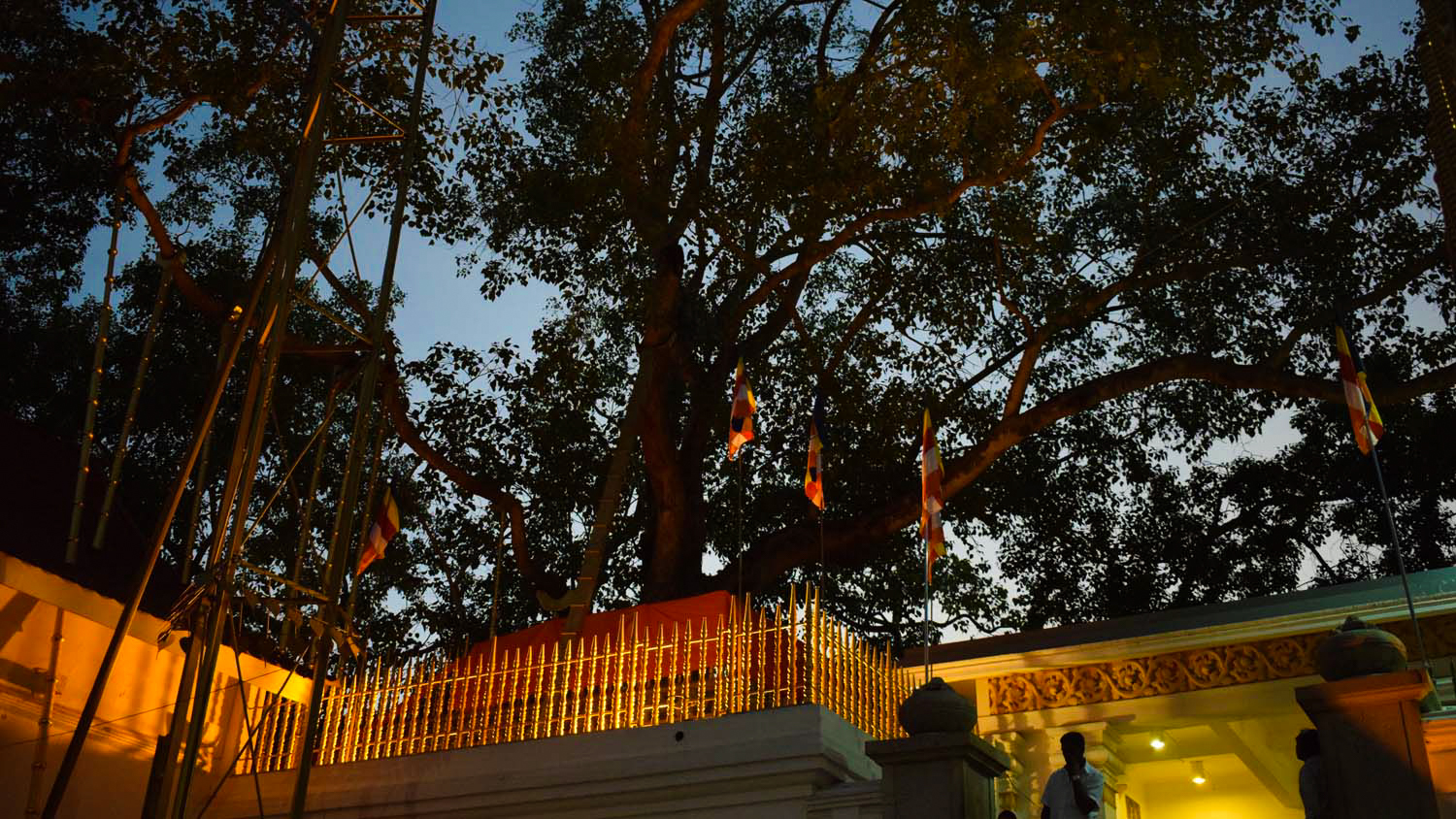
Jaya Sri Maha Bodhi, Anuradhapura, Sri Lanka

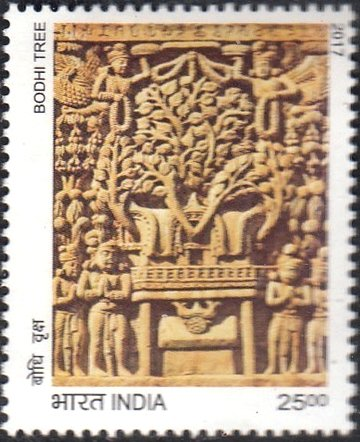
2017 Indian stamp with Bodhi tree

== See also ==
- List of individual trees
- Rājāyatana tree
- Sacred tree
- Sahabi Tree
