= Khiraule =

Khiraule खिरौले
- Village
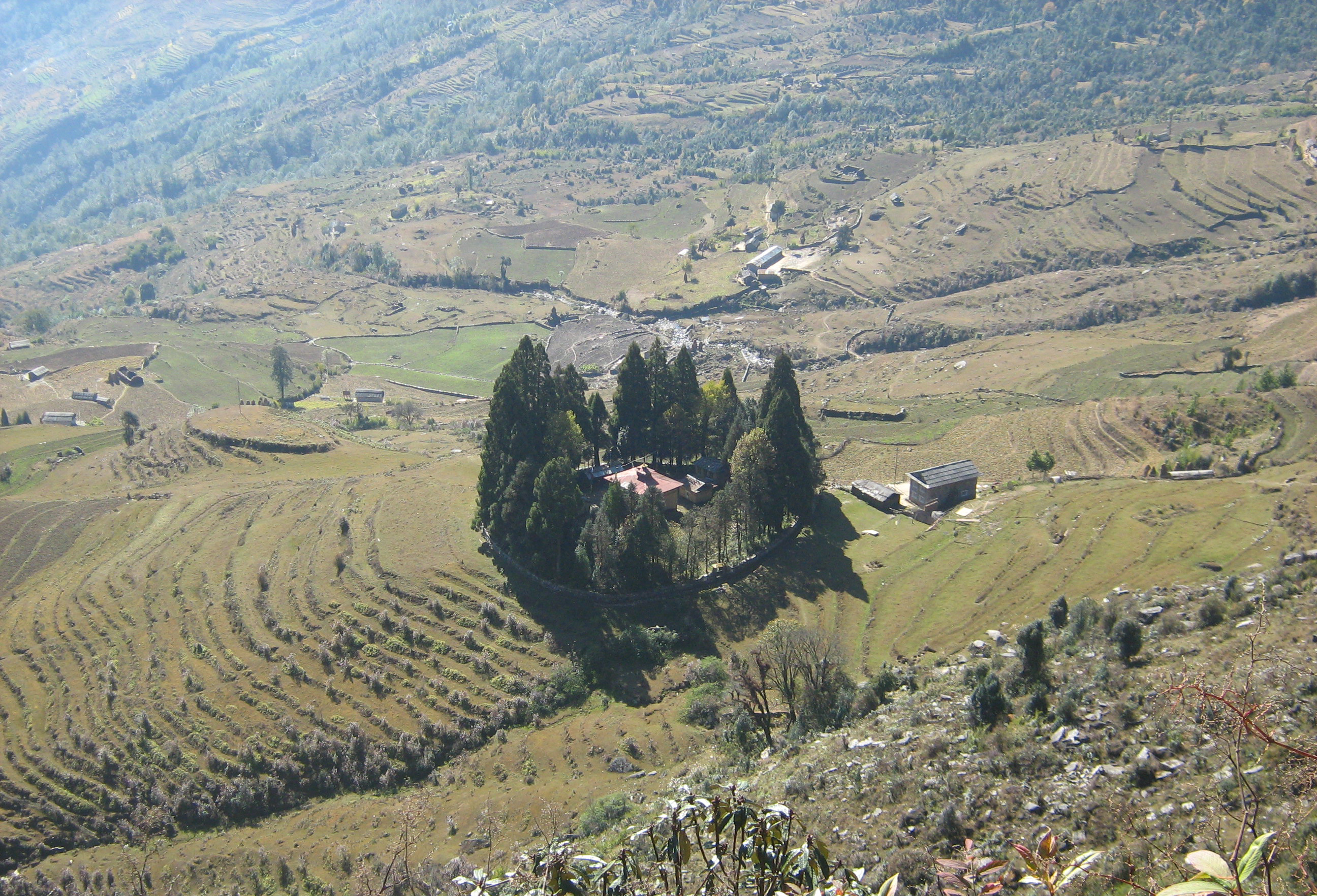
- Picture of Khiraule Village and Khiraule Monastery (encircled by pine trees) captured on 6 December 2007

- Location in Province No. 1 Khiraule (Nepal)
- Coordinates: 27°32′30″N 86°48′57″E
- Country: Nepal
- Province: Province No. 1
- Zone: Sagarmatha Zone
- District: Solukhumbu District
- Rural municipality: Mahakulung
- Elevation: 2,400 m (7,900 ft)
- Time zone: UTC+5:45 (Nepal Time)
- Postal code: 56000
- Area code: 038

Khiraule (Nepali: खिरौले) is a Sherpa village located in Solukhumbu District Province No. 1, part of northeastern Nepal. It is 50.0 km south of Mt. Everest and 148 km east of Kathmandu at an elevation of 2,400 m. The village has an area of six square kilometres, almost half of which is covered in forest. Khiraule used to be classified as a village of Ward no. 9 of Bung Village Development Committee, but after the dissolution of the committees and establishment of gaunpalikas, it was reclassified as one of the villages of Ward no. 1 of Mahakulung Rural Municipality.

== Religious Sites ==
=== Monastery ===
There is a monastery in Khiraule which is officially registered as Ngonga Thyakchhyok Chhyoling Monastery. It is also known as Khiraule Monastery and Chambaling Monastery.

=== Stupa (Chorten) ===
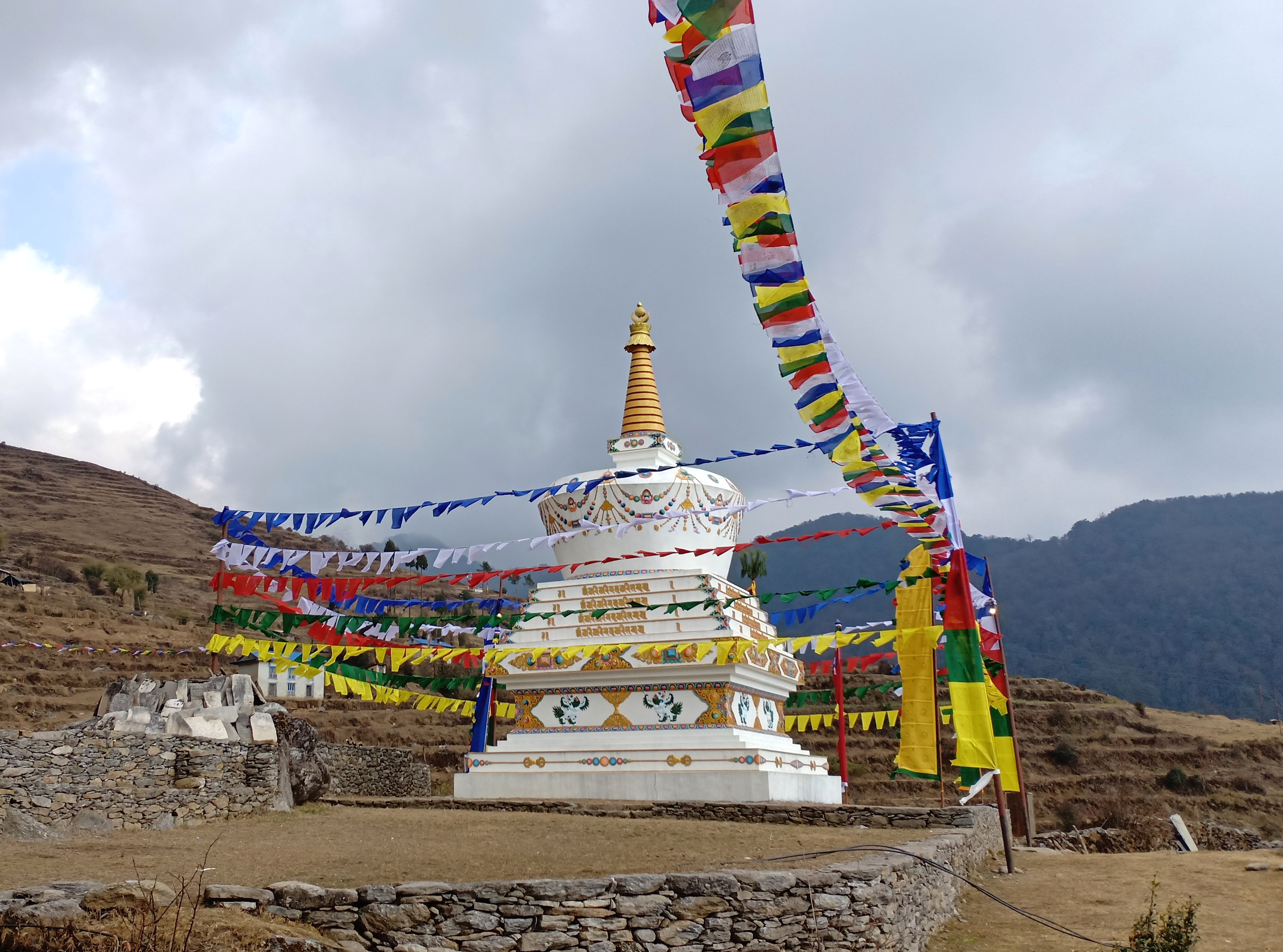
Chyang Chub Chorten in Khiraule

A 45 foot tall stupa, Chyang Chub Chorten (Nepali: बोधि चैत्य), was built in Khiraule in 2019 and consecrated in 2020. The stupa, which is also known as the Enlightenment Stupa, is one of the eight types of Tibetan stupas that symbolize important events in the life of Gautama Buddha. The stupa built in Khiraule symbolizes Buddha's enlightenment under the Bodhi Tree in Bodh Gaya.

== School ==
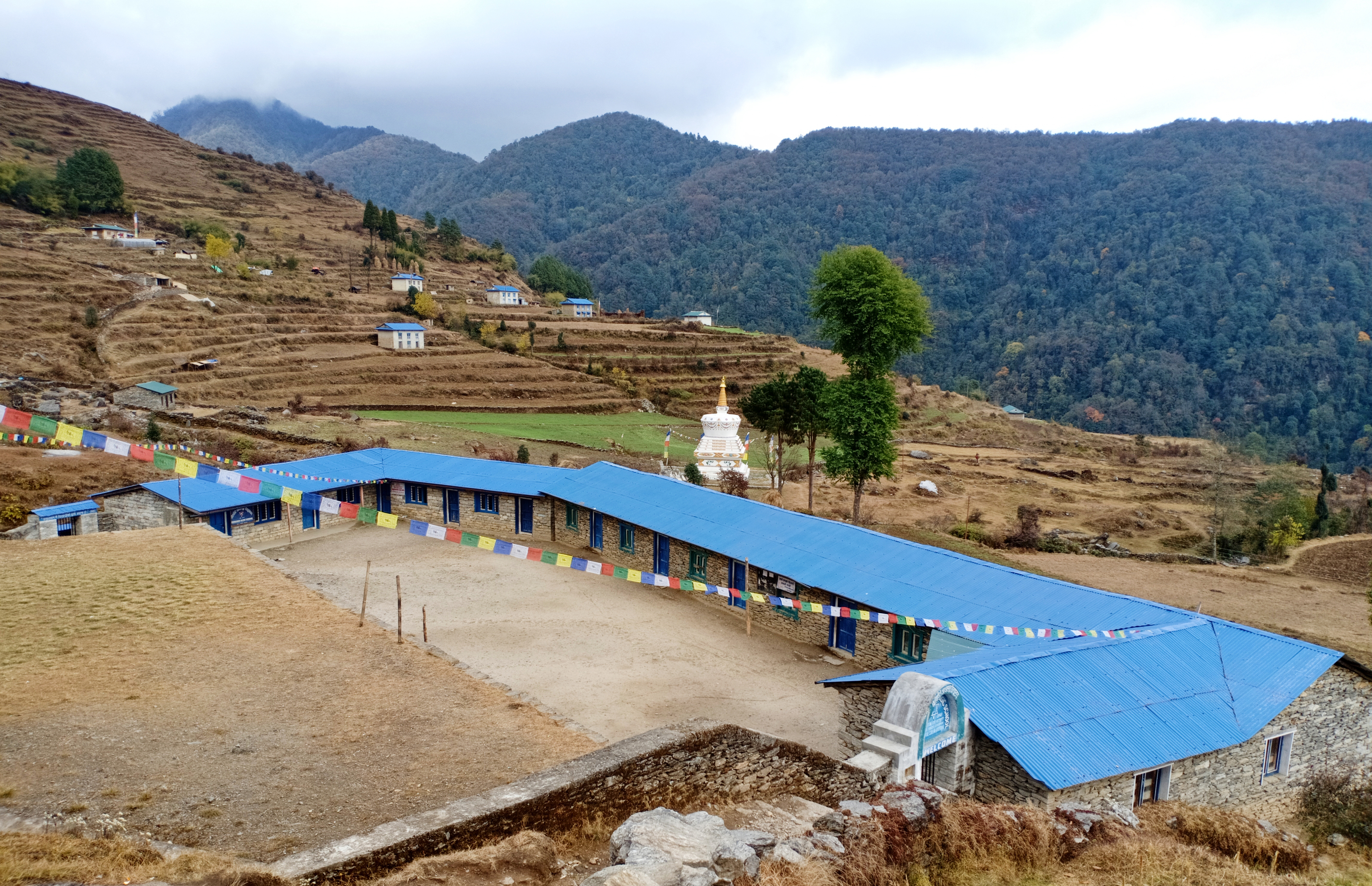
Khiraule Lower Secondary School with the village in the background

Khiraule Lower Secondary School is the first and only school in Khiraule. It was officially established in 2049 B.S. Many improvements to the school's infrastructure were carried out in recent years with the help of private contributors.

== Hydropower ==
Surke Khola Micro Hydropower is the first hydropower plant in Khiraule. The plant was completed and started operation in 2019.

== Medical Center (Clinic) ==
Khiraule Community Heath Unit was established in 2016.
