= Shorea robusta seed oil =

Edible oil extracted from the seeds of Shorea robusta

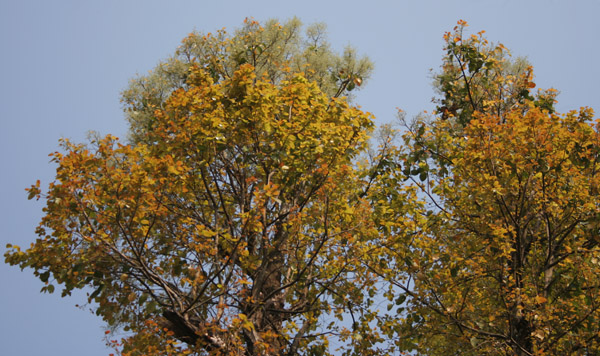
Flowering canopy

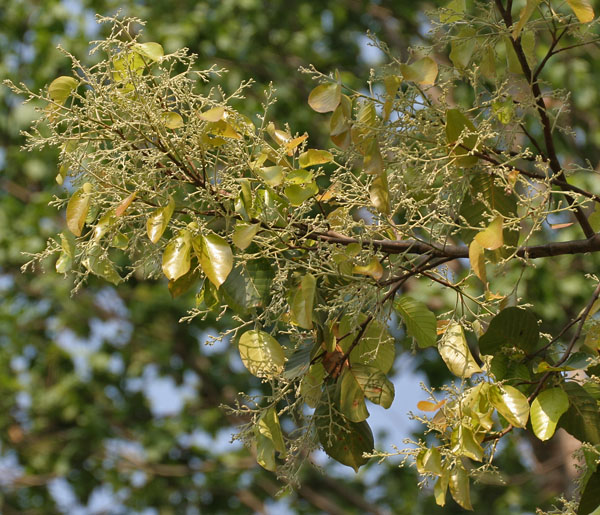
New leaves with flower buds

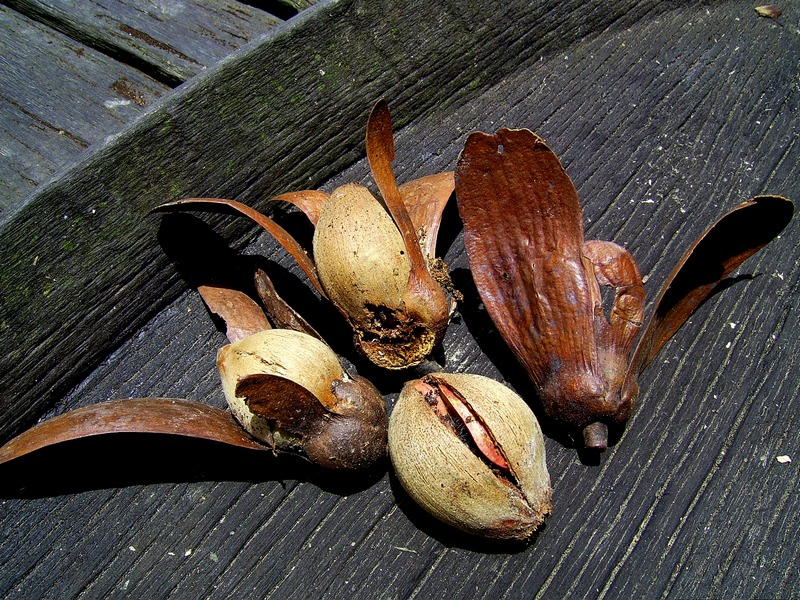
Ripe fruits

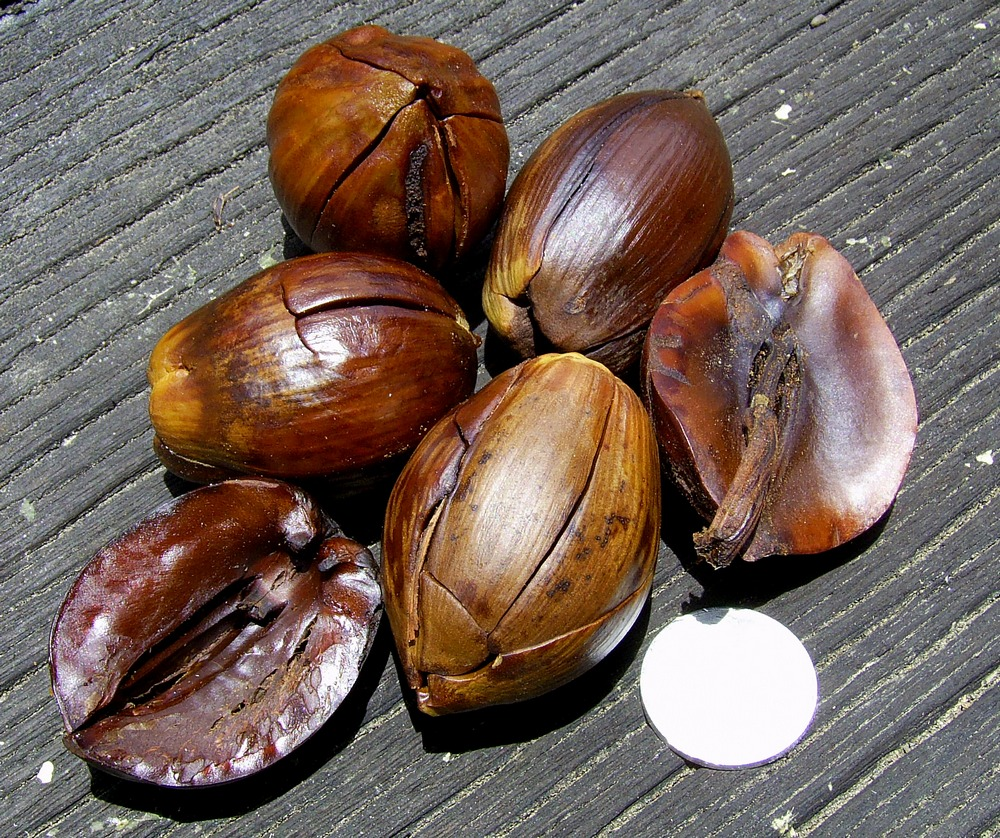
Seeds

Shorea robusta seed oil is an edible oil extracted from the seeds of Shorea robusta. Shorea robusta is known as the Sal tree in India. Sal is indigenous to India and occurs in two main regions separated by the Gangetic Plain, namely the northern and central Indian regions. The plant belongs to the Dipterocarpaceae botanical family.

== Common name in Indian languages ==
- Common name: Sal
- Hindi:( साल) Sal, Salwa, Sakhu, Sakher
- Marathi: sal, guggilu, rala, sajara

+Telugu: Guggilamu

- Tamil: attam, venkungiliyam, kungiliyam
- Malayalam: kaimaruthu, kungiliyam, maramaram
- Kannada: ashvakarna, asina, asu, bile-bhogimara
- Bengali: Sal
- Oriya: sala
- Urdu: Ral, Safed dammar
- Assamese: Sal, Hal
- Sanskrit: agnivallabha, ashvakarna, ashvakarnika

== Tree ==
S. robusta is a deciduous tree that reaches up to 50 m (160 ft), with a trunk circumference up to 5 m (16 ft). Under normal conditions they reach 18–32 m (59–105 ft) with girths of 1.5–2 m (4 ft 11 in – 6 ft 7 in). The trunk is clean, straight and cylindrical, often bearing epicormic branches. The crown is spreading and spherical. The bark is dark brown and thick, with longitudinal fissures deep in poles, becoming shallow in mature trees, and provides effective fire protection. The tree develops a long taproot at a young age. The tree grows at 100–1,500 m (330–4,920 ft) altitude. The mean annual temperature required is between 22–27 °C (72–81 °F) and 34–47 °C (93–117 °F). The tree requires mean annual rainfall between 1,000–3,000 mm (39–118 in) and maximum of 6,600 mm (260 in). S. robusta flourishes best in deep, well-drained, moist, slightly acid, sandy to clayey soils. It does not tolerate waterlogging. The most favourable soil is a moist sandy loam with good subsoil drainage. Soil moisture is essential.

Leaves are simple, shiny, about 10–25 cm (3.9–9.8 in) long and broadly oval at the base, with the apex tapering into a long point. New leaves are reddish, soon becoming delicate green.

Flowers are yellowish-white, arranged in large terminal or axillary racemose panicles.

Fruit at full size is about 1.3–1.5 cm (0.51–0.59 in) long and 1 cm (0.39 in) in diameter; it is surrounded by segments of the calyx enlarged into 5 rather unequal wings about 5–7.5 cm (2.0–3.0 in) long. Fruit content is 66.4% kernel and pod, 33.6% is shell and calyx. The fruits generally ripen in May.

The seed contains 14-15% fat. It has calyx and wings. The de-winged seeds contain a thin, brittle seed pod. The kernel has 5 segments covering the embryo. 2 kg (4.4 lb) of seeds give 1 kg (2.2 lb) of kernel. The seeds are 10.8% water, 8% protein, 62.7% carbohydrate, 14.8% oil, 1.4% fiber and 2.3% ash.

=== Habitat ===
This species ranges south of the Himalaya, from Myanmar in the east to Nepal, India and Bangladesh. The tree is widely distributed in tropical regions and covers about 13.3% of the forested area in the country. Sal (Shorea robusta) tree occurs either gregariously or mixed with other trees in Himalayan foot hills and central India. In the Himalayan foothill belt it extends up to Assam valley (including Meghalaya and Tripura) in the east to foothills of north-west Bengal, Uttar Pradesh, Uttaranchal, Kangra region of Himachala Pradesh. The Gangetic Plain separate the Himalayan foothill from the central Indian belt.

== Seed collection-oil extraction ==
Sal is a major means of survival for forest dwellers in the Central Indian states of Orissa, Chhattisgarh and Madhya Pradesh. These three states include the country's largest sal belt. Sal forest covers about 45% of their forested areas. Orissa has the largest sal forest, covering 38,300 km^{2} (14,800 sq mi) followed by Madhya Pradesh with 27,800 km^{2} (10,700 sq mi) and Chhattisgarh with 24,245 km^{2} (9,361 sq mi). Across these three states some 20-30 million forest dwellers depend on collection of sal seeds, leaves and resins. The proper storage of seeds before processing is crucial. Excess moisture (>6-8%) damages oil quality via hydrolysis in the seed fat, with resulting high free fatty acid oil output.

Sal fat is extracted via three methods. Traditionally fat is extracted by water rendering. The second, mechanical system is extraction by oil expeller and rotary mills. The third method is via solvent extraction in which the seed is pressed as flakes first in a flaker mill and exposed to solvent extraction.

== Characteristics ==
The extracted crude sal oil/fat is greenish-brown and has a characteristic odour. Due to the presence of more saturated fatty acids, it is solid at room temperature. Because of this, it is known as sal fat or sal butter. The oil is used as cooking oil after refining. The oil contains 35-45% stearic acid, an 18-carbon saturated fatty acid, and 40-45% oleic acid, which is a mono unsaturated fatty acid, with 18 carbon atoms. The refined oil is used as substitute for cocoa butter in chocolate manufacturing.

Physical and chemical properties of oil
Property	Range/limit
Appearance	white color solid
Odor	characteristic odor
Taste	Typical taste
Specific gravity	.88-0.914
Slip melting point	30-35 °C
Peroxide value	4.0
Iodine value	38-42
Saponification value	187-193
Unsaponifiable matter	1.2% max
Refractive Index at 40 °C	1.4500-1.4600
Titer °C	46-53

Fatty acid composition of oil
Fatty acid	Percentage
Palmitic acid (C16:0)	4-8
Stearic acid (C18:0)	40-50
Arachidic acid (C20:0)	5-8
Oleic acid (C18:1)	35-45
Linoleic (C18:2)	1-4

== Applications ==
Sal oil or butter is used for cooking locally and used for soap up to 30%. Refined, modified fat is a substitute for cocoa butter and used in confectionery industry. Sal butter is used in the manufacturing of edible ghee (vanaspati), paints and pigments, lubricants, auto oil, etc.

== See also ==
- Shorea robusta
