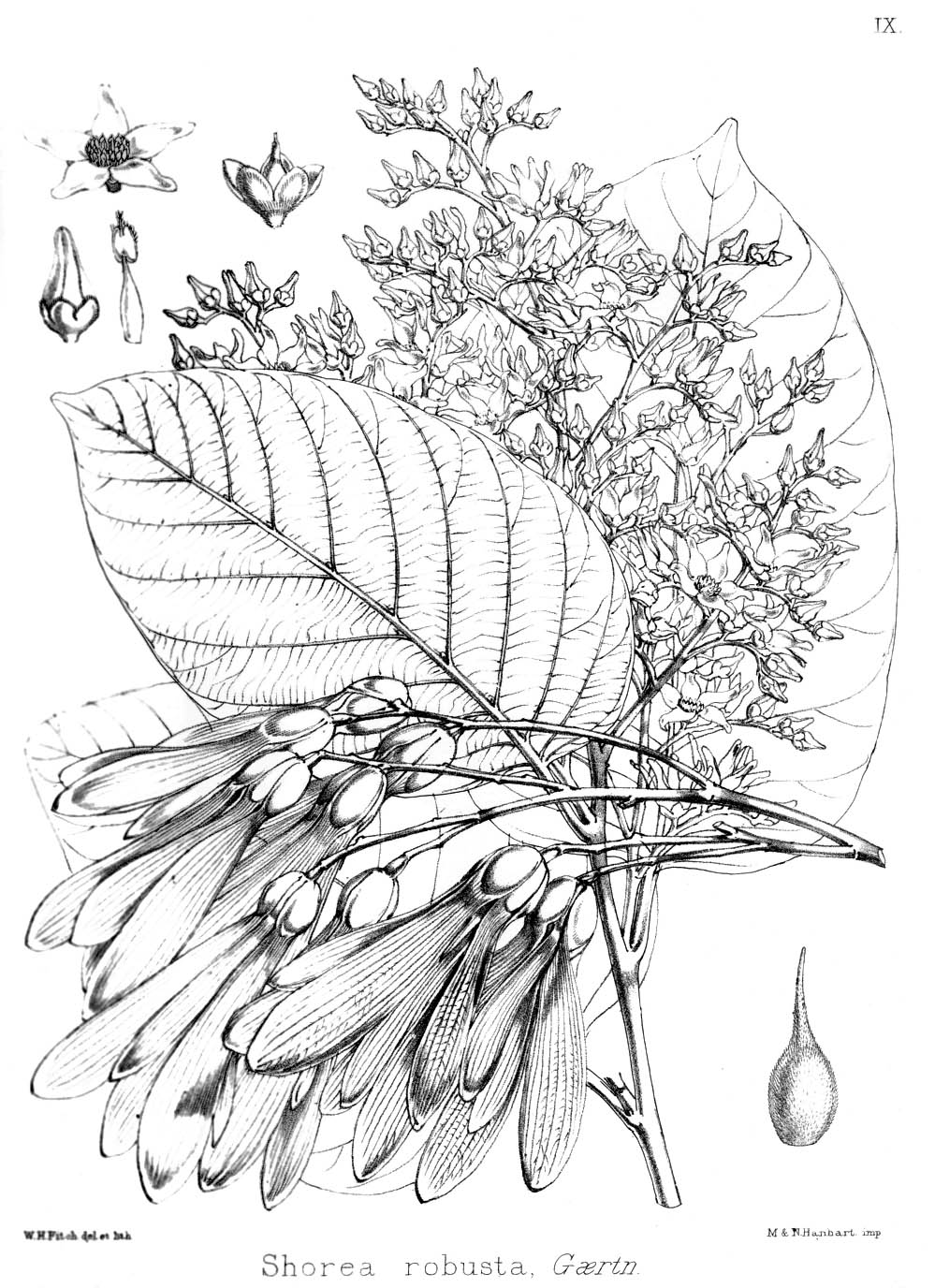

Conservation status
- Near Threatened (IUCN 3.1)

Scientific classification
- Kingdom: Plantae
- Clade: Tracheophytes
- Clade: Angiosperms
- Clade: Eudicots
- Clade: Rosids
- Order: Malvales
- Family: Dipterocarpaceae
- Genus: Shorea
- Species: S. robusta

Binomial name
- Shorea robusta C.F.Gaertn.

Synonyms
- Dryobalanops robusta (C.F.Gaertn.) Oken; Vatica robusta (C.F.Gaertn.) Steud.

= Shorea robusta =

Tree species native to South Asia

Shorea robusta, the sal tree (Devanagari: साल; IAST: sāla), shala, sakhua, or sarai, is a species of tree in the family Dipterocarpaceae. The tree is native to India, Bangladesh, Nepal, Tibet and across the Himalayan regions.

== Evolution ==
Fossil evidence from lignite mines in the Indian states of Rajasthan and Gujarat indicate that sal trees (or at least a closely related Shorea species) have been a dominant tree species of forests of the Indian subcontinent since at least the early Eocene (roughly 49 million years ago), at a time when the region otherwise supported a very different biota from the modern day. Evidence comes from the numerous amber nodules in these rocks, which originate from the dammar resin produced by the sal trees.

== Description ==
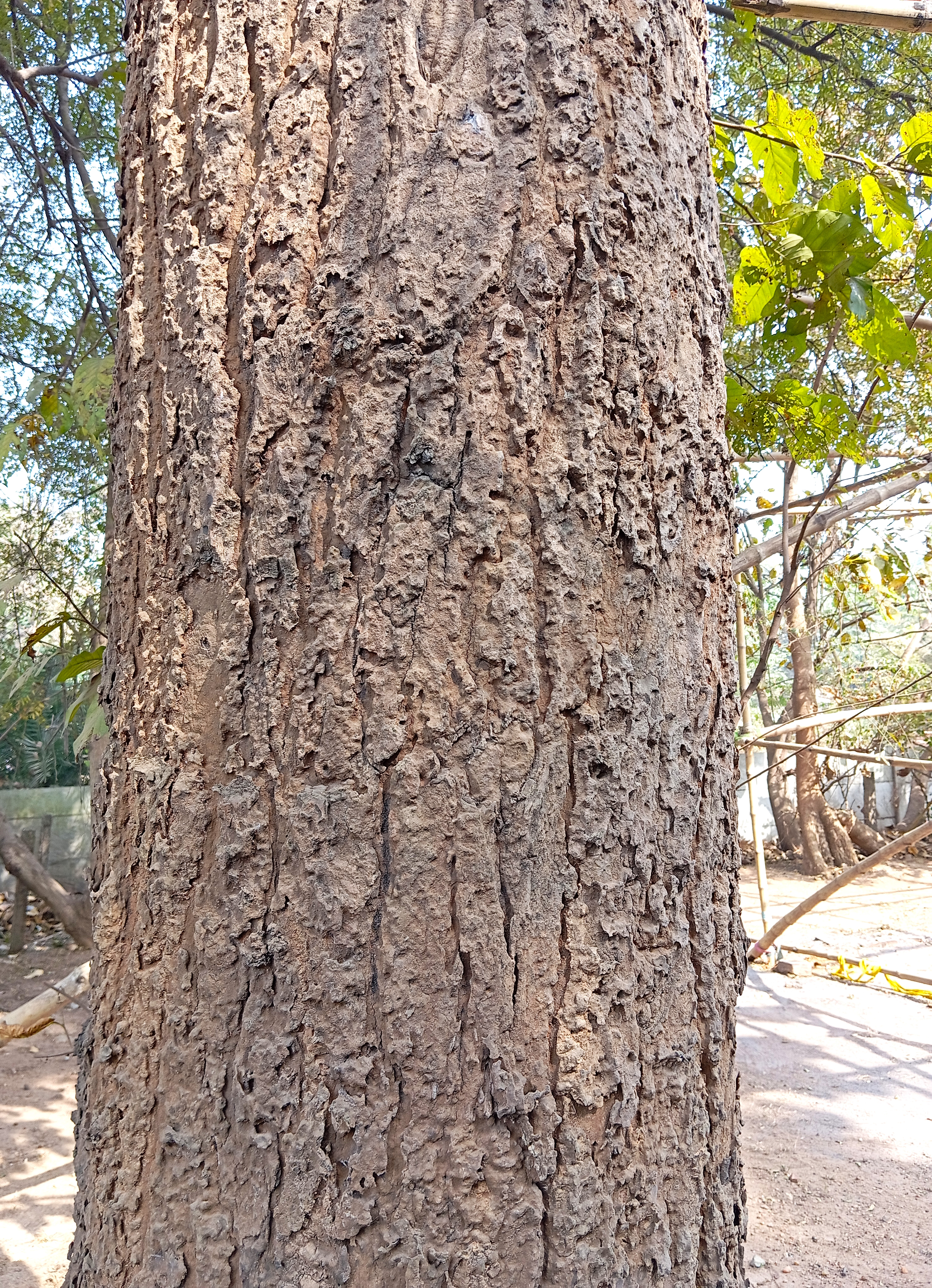
Sal Tree (Shorea robusta) lower trunk, India

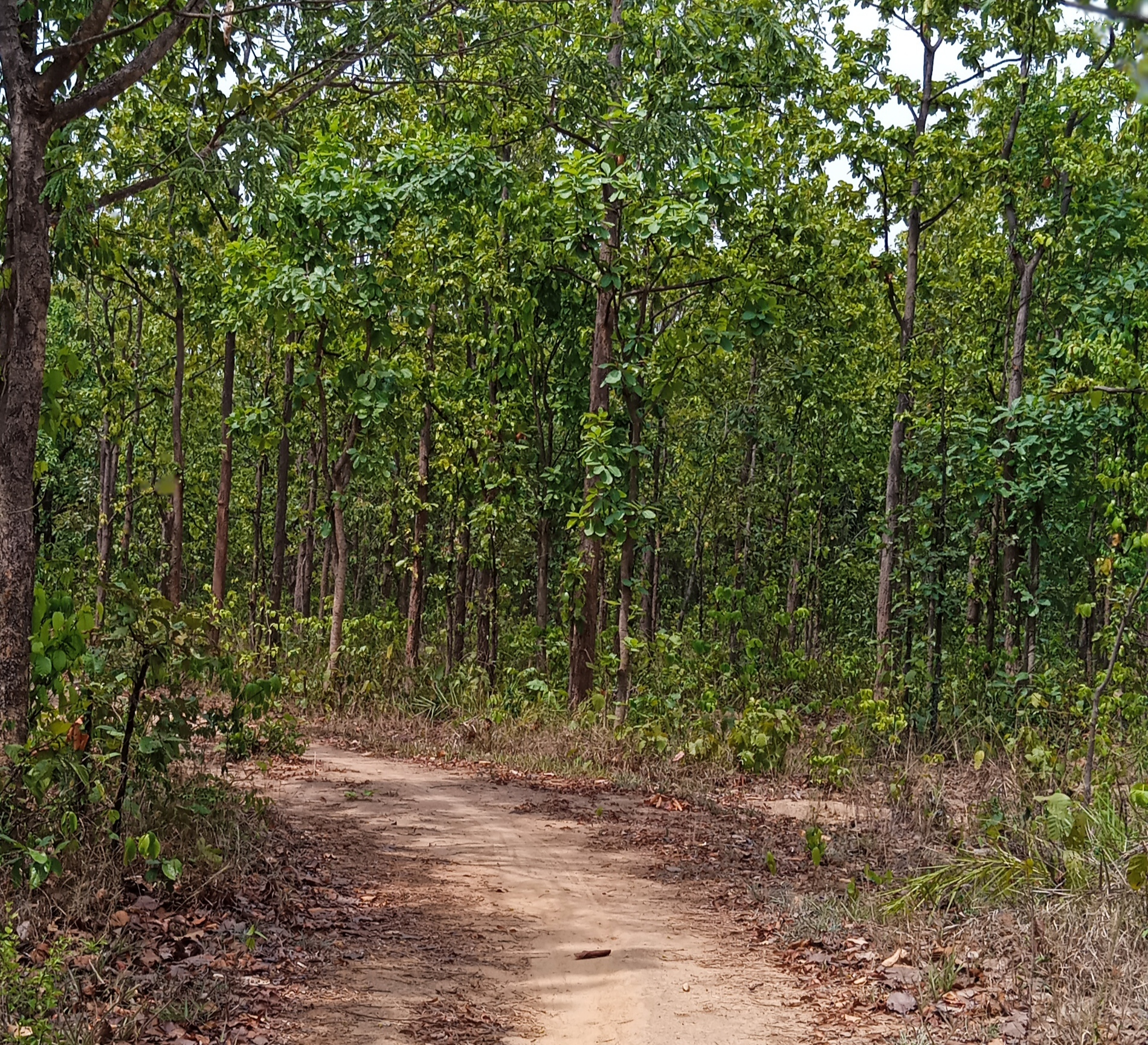
Sal forests in Purulia, India

Shorea robusta can grow up to 40 metres (130 feet) tall with a trunk diameter of 2 metres (6.6 feet). The leaves are 12–25 cm long and 5–15 cm broad. In wetter areas, sal is evergreen; in drier areas, it is dry-season deciduous, shedding most of the leaves from February to April, leafing out again in April and May.

The sal tree is known also as sakhua in northern India, including Madhya Pradesh, Odisha and Jharkhand. It is the state tree of two Indian states – Chhattisgarh and Jharkhand.

== Distribution and habitat ==
This tree is native to the Indian subcontinent, ranging south of the Himalaya, from Myanmar in the east to Nepal, India and Bangladesh. In India, it extends from Chhattisgarh, Assam, Bengal, Odisha and Jharkhand west to the Shivalik Hills in Haryana, east of the Yamuna. The range also extends through the Eastern Ghats and to the eastern Vindhya and Satpura ranges of central India. It is often the dominant tree in the forests where it occurs. In Nepal, it is found mostly in the Terai region from east to west, especially, in the Sivalik Hills (Churia Range) in the subtropical climate zone. There are many protected areas, such as Chitwan National Park, Bardia National Park and Shuklaphanta National Park, where there are dense forests of huge sal trees. It is also found in the lower belt of the Hilly region and Inner Terai.

== Culture ==
=== Hinduism ===
In Hindu tradition, the sal tree is sacred. The tree is also associated with Vishnu. The tree's common name, sal, comes from the word shala, which means 'rampart' in Sanskrit.

Jains state that the 24th tirthankara, Mahavira, achieved enlightenment under a sal.

Some cultures in Bengal worship Sarna Burhi, a goddess associated with sacred groves of Sal trees.

There is a standard decorative element of Hindu Indian sculpture which originated in a yakshini grasping the branch of a flowering tree while setting her foot against its roots. This decorative sculptural element was integrated into Indian temple architecture as salabhanjika or "sal tree maiden", although it is not clear whether it is a sal tree or an asoka tree. The tree is also mentioned in the Ramayana—specifically, where Lord Rama (on request of deposed monkey-king Sugriva for proof he can kill Sugriva's older half-brother Vali) is asked to pierce seven sals in a row with a single arrow (which is later used to kill Vali, and still later to behead Ravana's brother Kumbhakarna)

In the Kathmandu Valley of Nepal, one can find typical Nepali pagoda temple architectures with very rich wooden carvings, and most of the temples, such as Nyatapola Temple, are made of bricks and sal tree wood.

=== Buddhism ===
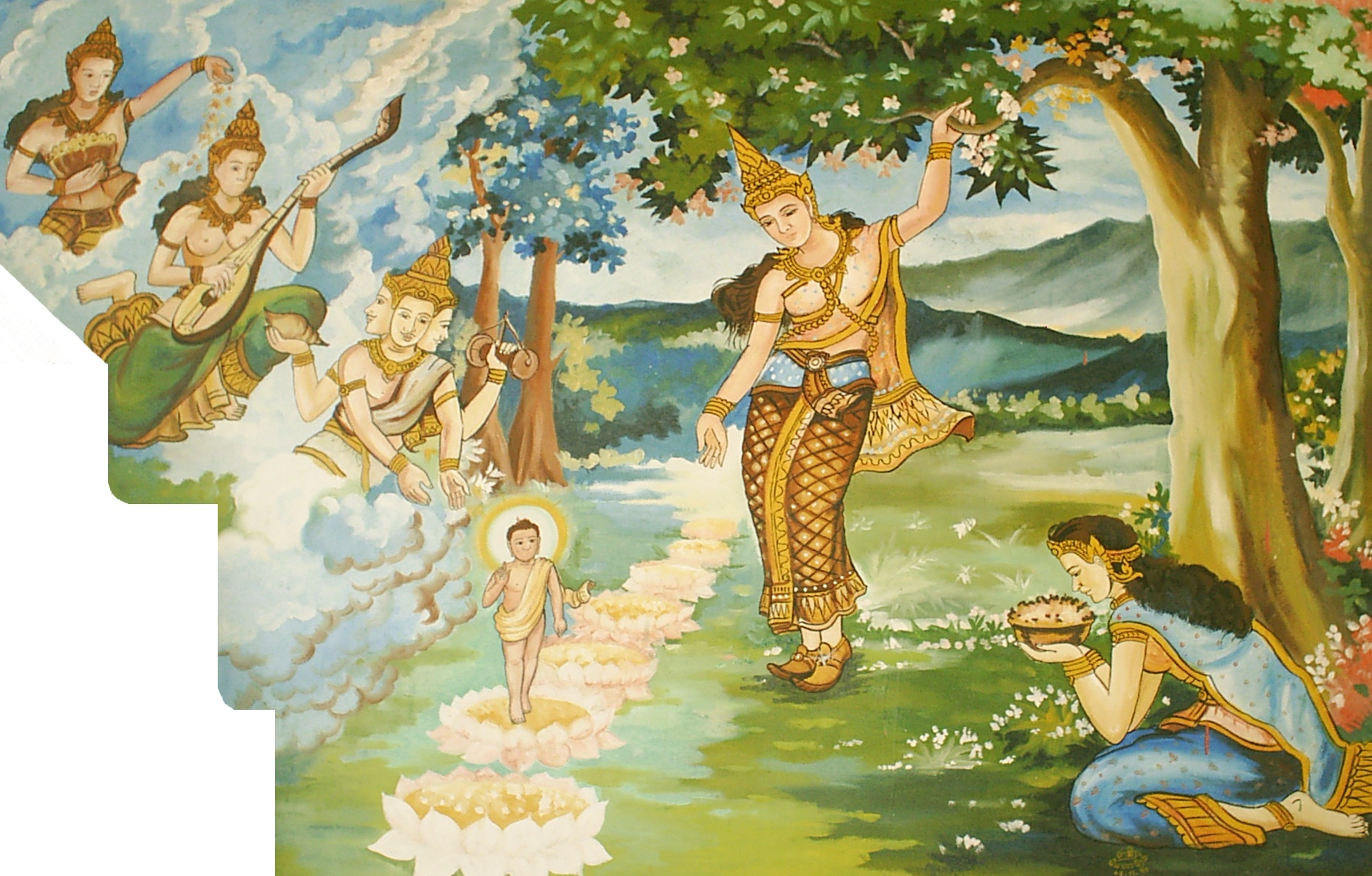
Queen Mahamāyā giving birth to the Buddha under sala tree while grasping the branch.

Buddhist tradition holds that Queen Māyā of Sakya, while en route to her grandfather's kingdom, gave birth to Gautama Buddha while grasping the branch of a sal tree or an Ashoka tree in a garden in Lumbini in south Nepal.

Also according to Buddhist tradition, the Buddha was lying between a pair of sal trees when he died:

Then the Blessed One with a large community of monks went to the far shore of the Hiraññavati River and headed for Upavattana, the Mallans' sal-grove near Kusinara. On arrival, he said to Ven. Ananda, "Ananda, please prepare a bed for me between the twin sal-trees, with its head to the north. I am tired, and will lie down."

The sal tree is also said to have been the tree under which Koṇḍañña and Vessabhū, respectively the fifth and twenty-fourth Buddhas preceding Gautama Buddha, attained enlightenment.

In Buddhism, the brief flowering of the sal tree is used as a symbol of impermanence and the rapid passing of glory, particularly as an analog of sic transit gloria mundi. In Japanese Buddhism, this is best known through the opening line of The Tale of the Heike – a tale of the rise and fall of a once-powerful clan – whose latter half reads "the color of the sāla flowers reveals the truth that the prosperous must decline." (沙羅雙樹の花の色、盛者必衰の理を顯す, sharasōju no hana no iro, jōshahissui no kotowari wo arawasu), quoting the four-character idiom jōsha hissui (盛者必衰) from a passage in the Humane King Sutra, "The prosperous inevitably decline, the full inevitably empty" (盛者必衰、実者必虚, jōsha hissui, jissha hikkyo?).

== Confusion with cannonball tree and other trees ==
In Asia, the sal tree is often confused with the Couroupita guianensis or cannonball tree, a tree from tropical South America introduced to Asia by the British in the 19th century. The cannonball tree has since then been planted at Buddhist and Hindu religious sites in Asia in the belief that it is the tree of sacred scriptures. In Sri Lanka, Thailand and other Theravada Buddhist countries it has been planted at Buddhist monasteries and other religious sites. In India the cannonball tree has been planted at Shiva temples and is called Shiv Kamal or Nagalingam since its flowers are said to resemble the hood of a Nāga (divine cobra) protecting a Shiva lingam. An example of a cannonball tree erroneously named 'sal tree' is at the Pagoda at the Royal Palace of Phnom Penh in Cambodia.

In Japan the sal tree of Buddhist scriptures is identified as the deciduous camellia (Stewartia pseudocamellia), called shāra, 沙羅, from Sanskrit śāla.

The sal tree is also said to be confused with the Ashoka tree (Saraca asoca).

== Uses ==
Sal is one of the most important sources of hardwood timber in India, with hard, coarse-grained wood that is light in colour when freshly cut, but becomes dark brown with exposure. The wood is resinous and durable, and is sought after for construction, although not well suited to planing and polishing. The wood is especially suitable for constructing frames for doors and windows.

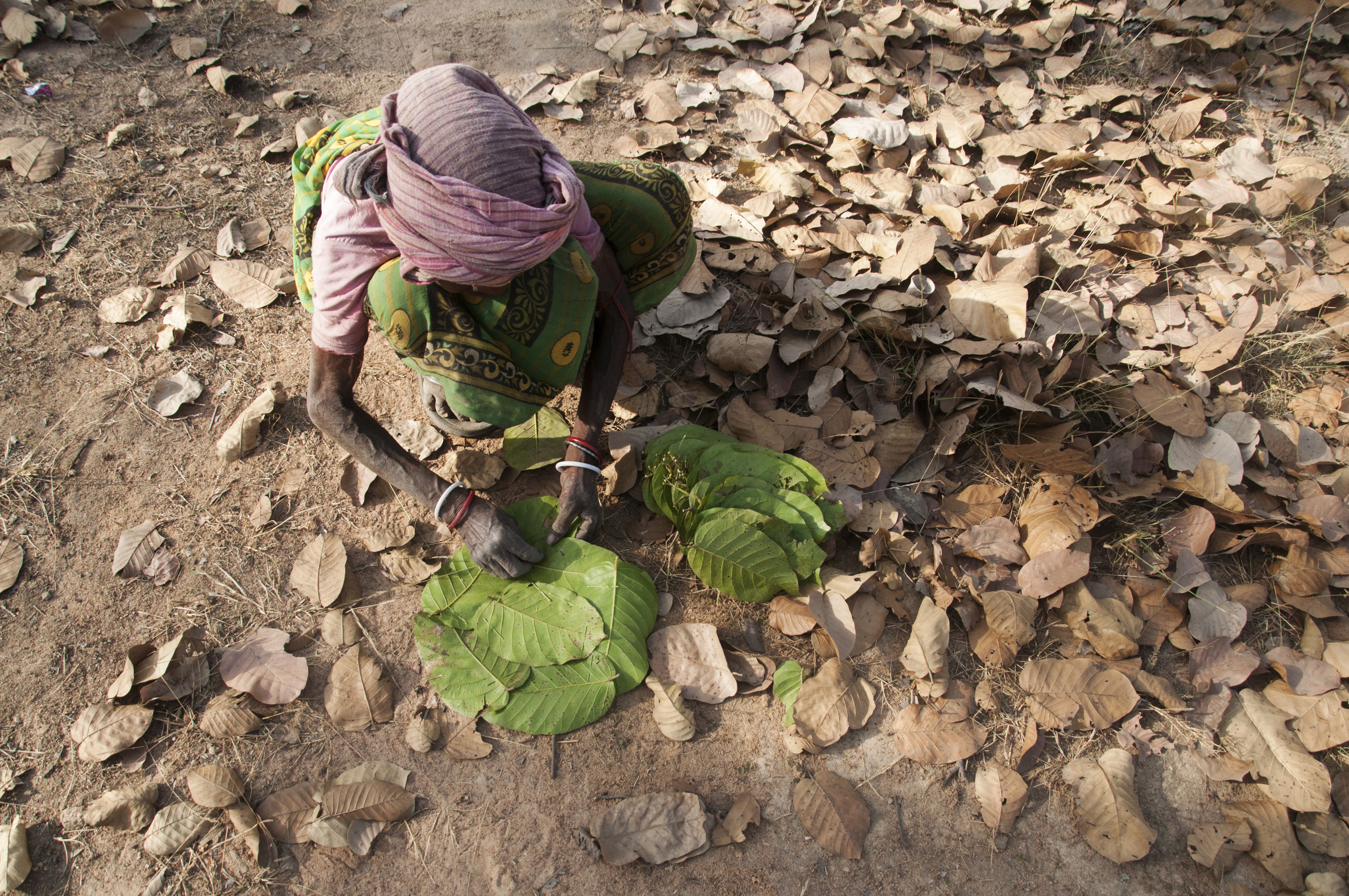
Making of sal leave plate.

The dry leaves of sal are a major source for the production of leaf plates and bowls called patravali in India and Nepal. The used leaves/plates are readily eaten by goats and cattle. In Nepal, its leaves are used to make local plates and vessels called "tapari", "doona" and "bogata" in which rice and curry is served. However, the use of such "natural" tools have sharply declined during the last decade.

Sal tree resin is known as sal dammar or Indian dammar, ṛla in Sanskrit. It is used as an astringent in Ayurvedic medicine, burned as incense in Hindu ceremonies, and used to caulk boats and ships.

Sal seeds and fruit are a source of lamp oil and vegetable fat. The seed oil is extracted from the seeds and used as cooking oil after refining.

== Gallery ==
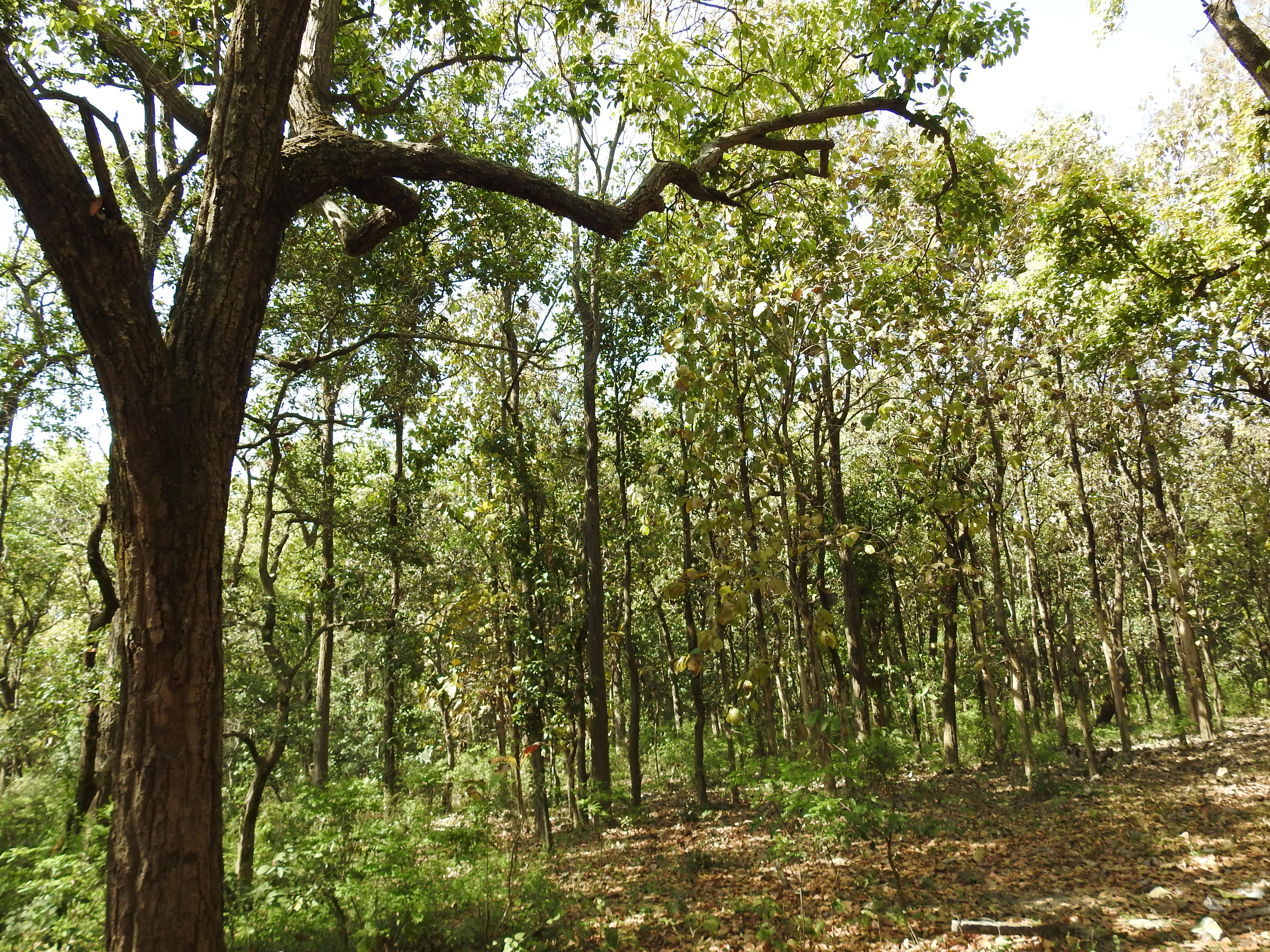
Sal forests in Dehradun, India

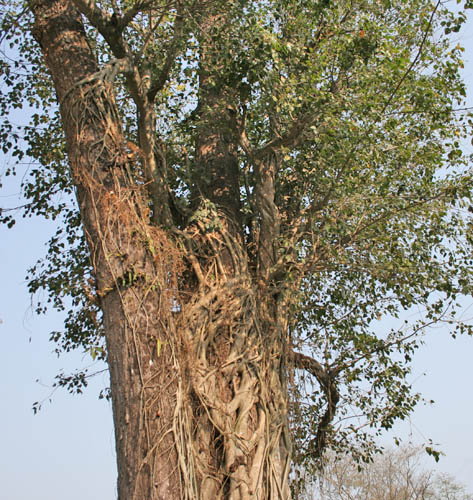
Sal trunk constricted by a ficus tree at Jayanti

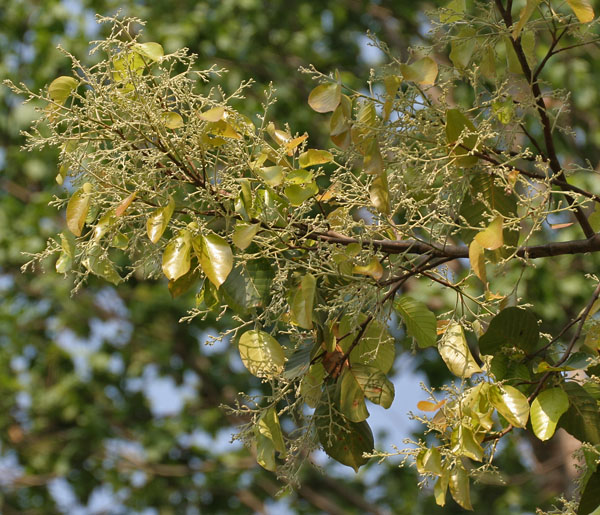
New leaves with flower buds West Bengal, India

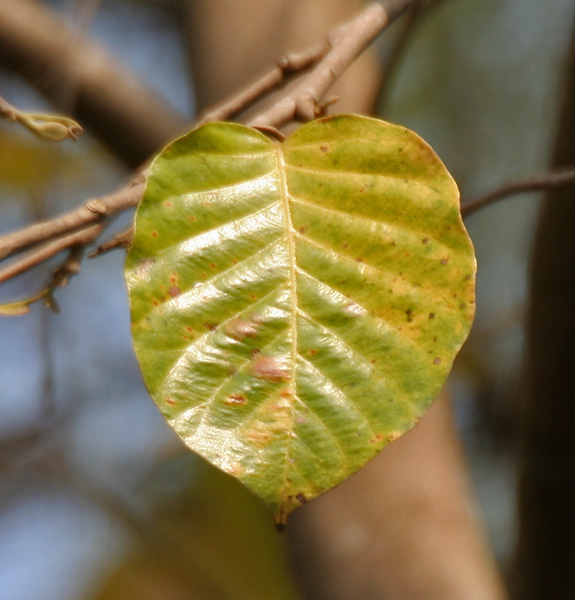
Old leaf at Jayanti

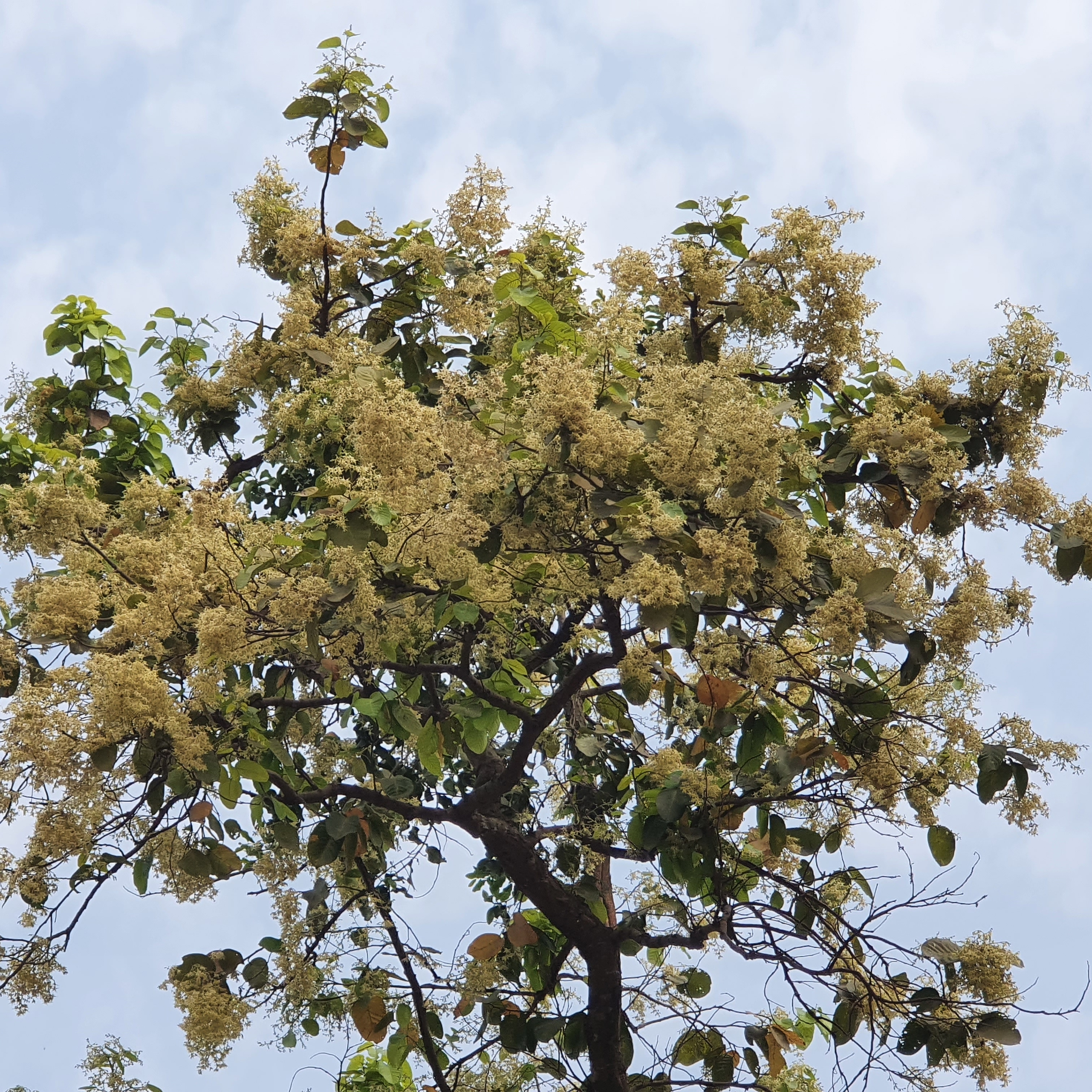
Sal tree in full bloom at Gazipur, Bangladesh

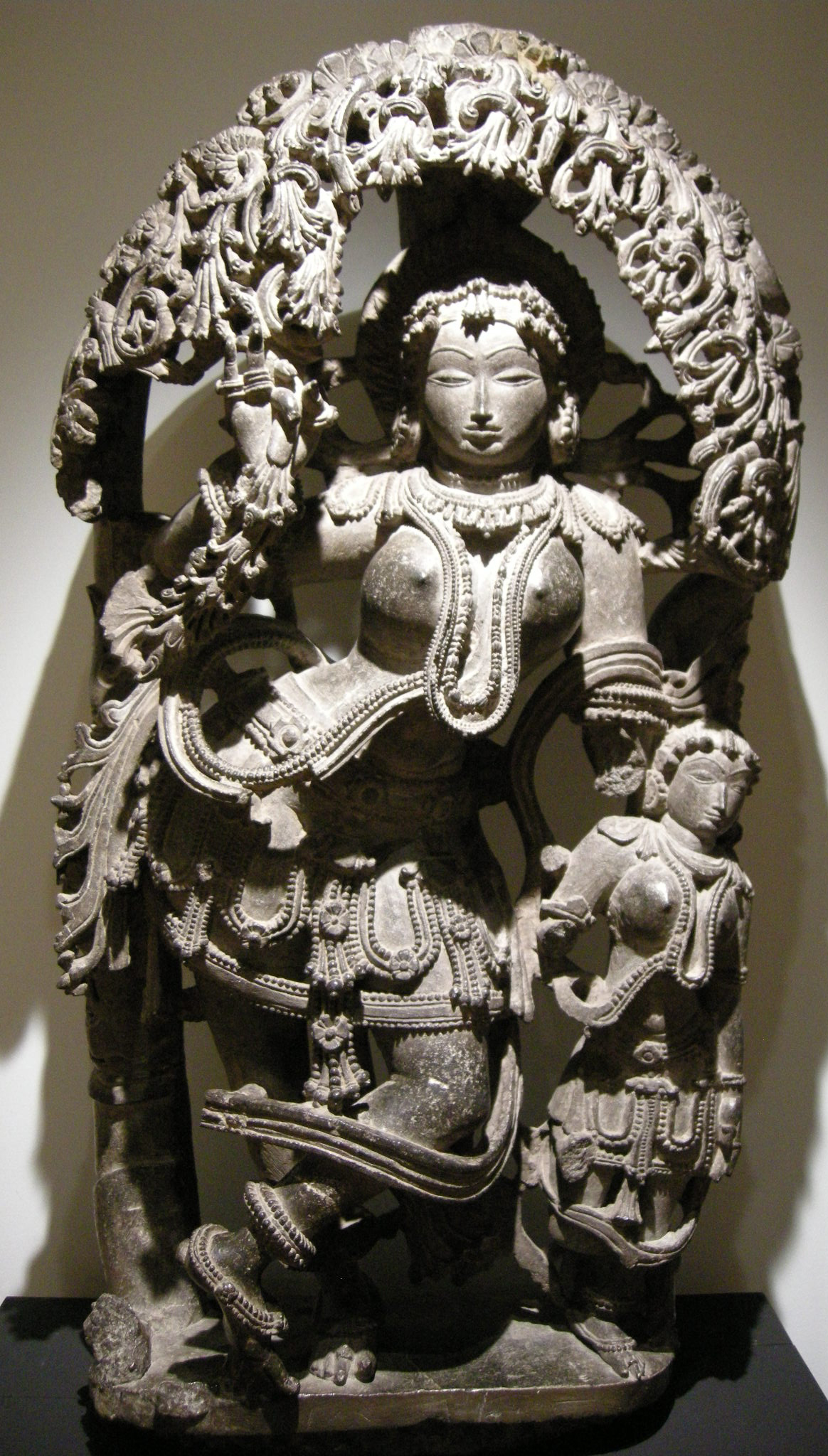
Salabhanjika or "sal tree maiden", Hoysala sculpture, Belur, Karnataka

== See also ==
- List of Indian timber trees
- Shorea robusta seed oil
- Yakshini
