= Sujāta Buddha =

Fifteenth of twenty eight Buddhas

- Sanskrit: सुजात; Sujāta
- Pāli: Sujāta
- Burmese: သုဇာတဘုရား
- Chinese: 善生佛 (Pinyin: Shànshēng Fó)
- Korean: 선생불 (RR: Seonsaeng Bul)
- Sinhala: සුජාත බුදුන් වහන්සේ Sujatha Budun Wahanse
- Thai: พระสุชาตพุทธเจ้า; Phra Suchart Phutthachao
- Vietnamese: Thiện Sanh Phật

Information
- Venerated by: Theravada, Mahayana, Vajrayana

According to Theravada Buddhism's Pali canon's Buddhavamsa and its commentary, Sujāta Buddha is the fifteenth of twenty-seven Buddhas who preceded the historical Gotama Buddha. He was also the second Buddha of the Maṇḍa kalpa.

The Buddhavamsa describes his appearance as:

He has a chin of a lion and shoulders of an ox. He is the most unique being and no one dared to approach him. With no dirt, his complexion shines like a clear moon or like a shining sun for eternity.

Sujāta Buddha was 50 cubits, or 75 feet tall and his stupa was 3 leagues, or about 15.36192 kilometres high.

== Biography ==
=== From birth to Enlightenment ===
Sujāta Buddha was born in Sumaṅgala. His parents were King Uggata and Queen Aggamahesī Pabhāvedi. He got his name from the people being peaceful and calm when he was born.

He was married to princess Sīrinandādevi and reigned for 9,000 years. After his son, Upasena was born, he decided to go practise asceticism. He went away with his horse, Hanvesa and ten million men followed him to become ascetics. He practised asceticism for nine months. After nine months, he began to practise alone and become enlightened under the Maha Bhodi tree in the next morning.

=== Gotama Buddha's wish ===
At Sujāta Buddha's time, Gotama Buddha was a Chakravarti, or a universal ruler. After hearing the enlightenment of Sujāta Buddha, he went to pay homage to him. He also gave away his possessions to become an ascetic. When he told his wish, Sujāta Buddha said "This king will become a Buddha named Gotama in the Bhadda-Kalpa which will appear after 30,000 kalpas".The incarnation of Gotama Buddha, having his wish granted, extended his practices and became a god at Brahma realm (ဗြဟ္မာ့ဘုံ).

=== Parinirvana ===
Sujāta Buddha lived for 90,000 years, liberating many living beings. He attained parinibbāna and died at Sīlārama monastery. His death is described as:

A unique Buddha like him, and unique characteristics of his, now have disappeared. Aren't all the things become a waste?

== Disciples ==
The right-hand and left-hand chief disciples of Sujāta Buddha were Shin Sudassana and Shin Sudeva. His primary attendant was Shin Nāyada. The female disciples were Shin Manāgā and Shin Manāgasamālā. The human disciples were the wealthy men, Sudatta and Citta, and the women, Subhadā and Padumā.
