= Taṇhaṅkara =

Earliest known Buddha

Taṇhaṅkara Buddha
- Sanskrit: Tṛṣṇaṃkara
- Pāli: Taṇhaṅkara
- Burmese: တဏှင်္ကရာ ဘုရား
- Sinhala: තණ්හංකර; Tanhankara

Information
- Venerated by: Theravada

Taṇhaṅkara or Taṇhaṅkara Buddha is the first of the twenty-seven Buddhas who preceded the historical Gotama Buddha and the earliest known Buddha. He was also the first Buddha of the Sāramaṇḍa kalpa.

In the Buddhavamsa of the Pali canon, he is briefly mentioned as:

Innumerable aeons ago, Taṇhaṅkara Buddha, Medhaṅkara Buddha, Saraṇaṅkara Buddha and Dīpaṃkara Buddha were born in the Sāramaṇḍa kalpa.

== Biography ==
He had practiced pāramitā for 16 asaṃkhyeya and 100,000 (16×10^{140} + 10^{5}) Mahā Kalpas (Great aeons) to gain true perfect enlightenment (Skt: Anuttarasamyaksambodhi). After practising, he resided at the tushita realm or 4th heaven.

He was born in Puphavedi to the King Sunanda and Queen Sunandā. When he became a king, he reigned over his country for ten thousand years. After his son was born, he decided to leave the castle and begin practicing. He practiced asceticism for seven days. He attained enlightenment under the Bodhi tree, Alstonia scholaris.

The incarnation of Shakyamuni Buddha became a disciple of him and asked for his wish. However, he did not grant his wish. After death, the incarnation become a Deva in the desire realm.

Taṇhaṅkara Buddha lived for 100,000 years. He liberated many millions of living beings in his lifetime.
