= Saraṇaṅkara =

Third of twenty-eight Buddhas

Saraṇaṅkara Buddha
- Sanskrit: Śaraṇaṃkara
- Pāli: Saraṇaṅkara
- Burmese: သရဏင်္ကရာ ဘုရား
- Sinhala: සරණංකර බුදුන් වහන්සේ Saranankara Budun Wahanse

Information
- Venerated by: Theravada

Saraṇaṅkara is the third of the twenty-seven buddhas who preceded the historical Gotama Buddha in some traditions. He was also the third Buddha of the Sāramaṇḍa kalpa and the predecessor of Dīpaṃkara Buddha.

In the Buddhavamsa of the Pali canon, he is briefly mentioned as:

Innumerable aeons ago, Taṇhaṅkara Buddha, Medhaṅkara Buddha, Saraṇaṅkara Buddha and Dīpaṃkara Buddha were born in the Sāramaṇḍa kalpa.

== Biography ==
He was born in Vipula. His parents were king Sumaṅgala and Queen Yasavadi. When he became an adult, he succeeded and reigned over the country for 7,000 years.

While reigning peacefully, he saw the Four sights created by the Deva. When his son was born, he decided to leave the castle and became an ascetic. He practiced asceticism for a month. He gained enlightenment under the Bodhi tree, Dolichandrone spathacea.

Having liberated many beings, Saraṇaṅkara Buddha attained Parinirvana at the age of 90,000 years.
