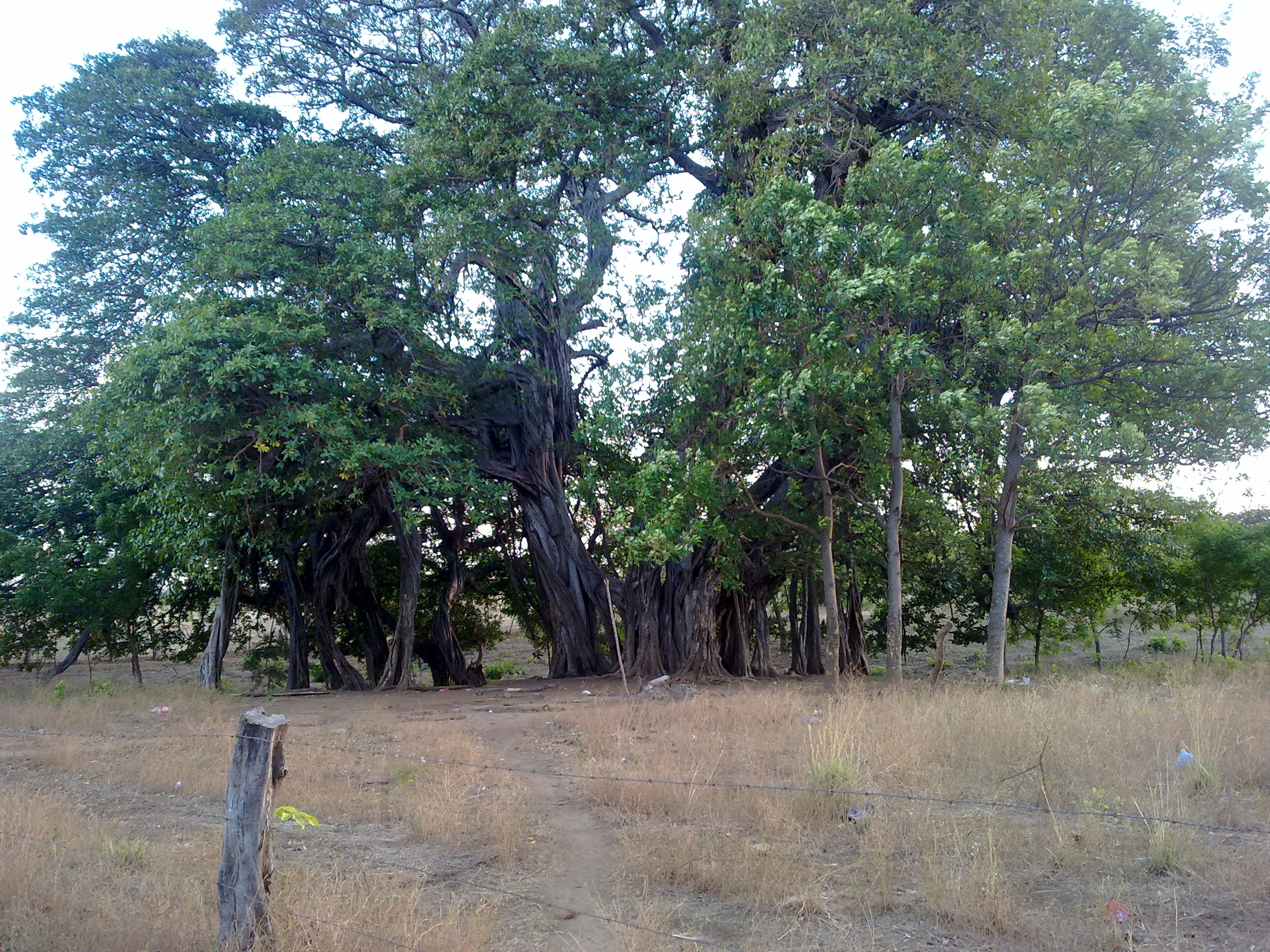
- Ficus obtusifolia tree in Samaria, Nicaragua.

Conservation status
- Least Concern (IUCN 3.1)

Scientific classification
- Kingdom: Plantae
- Clade: Tracheophytes
- Clade: Angiosperms
- Clade: Eudicots
- Clade: Rosids
- Order: Rosales
- Family: Moraceae
- Genus: Ficus
- Species: F. obtusifolia

Binomial name
- Ficus obtusifolia Kunth

Synonyms
- Ficus bonplandiana (Liebm.) Miq.; Ficus chiapensis Lundell; Ficus clusiifolia Kunth ex Walp.; Ficus floresina Pittier; Ficus gardneriana (Miq.) Miq.; Ficus involuta (Liebm.) Miq.; Ficus mattogrossensis Standl.; Ficus pascuorum Pittier; Ficus proctor-cooperi Standl.; Urostigma bonplandianum Liebm.; Urostigma gardnerianum Miq.; Urostigma involutum Liebm.

= Ficus obtusifolia =

Species of fig

Ficus obtusifolia is a species of tree in the family Moraceae. It is native to Mexico, Central America, and Bolivia, Brazil, Colombia, Ecuador, Peru, and Venezuela in tropical South America.

== Description ==
Trees up to 45 m tall, stranglers or independent; trunks mostly unbuttressed. Leaves obovate or oblanceolate, 15–25 cm long. Figs globose, 1.5–3 cm in diameter.
