= Kondanna Buddha =

Fifth of 28 Buddhas

Koṇḍañña Buddha
- Sanskrit: Kauṇḍinya
- Pāli: Koṇḍañña
- Burmese: ကောဏ္ဍညဘုရား
- Chinese: 智调佛 (Pinyin: Zhìdiào Fó) 憍陳如佛 (Pinyin: Jiāochénrú Fó)
- Korean: 교진여불 (RR: Gyojinyeo Bul)
- Sinhala: කොණ්ඩඤ්ඤ බුදුන් වහන්සේ Koṇḍañña Budun Wahansē
- Thai: พระโกณฑัญญพุทธเจ้า; Phra Konthanya Phutthachao
- Vietnamese: Kiều Trần Như Phật

Information

Koṇḍañña is one of the 29 Buddhas of Theravāda Buddhism. He was born in Rammavati. His father was King Sunanda and his mother Sujata. He belonged to the Kondannagotta, and was twenty-eight cubits tall. For ten thousand years he lived as a layman in Ruci, Suruci and Subha. His wife was Rudidevi and his son Vijitasena.

He left home and performed austerities for ten months until he was given milk rice by Yasodhara, daughter of the merchant Saundana. He was given grass for his seat by Ajivaka Sundana. His Tree of Enlightenment was a Salakalyani tree, and his first sermon was to ten choirs of monks in the Devavana near Amaravati. He had three assemblies of his disciples, the first led by Subhadda, then by Vijitasena, and finally Udena.

He died aged one hundred thousand years at Canarama, where a stupa seven leagues tall was constructed over his relics. In the Buddhavamsa commentary it is said that Koṇḍañña's relics were not dispersed but kept in a single mass.

His chief disciples were Bhadda and Subhadda among the monks and Tissa and Upatissa among the nuns, with Anurudda his attendant. His chief patrons were Sona and Upasona among the laymen and Nanda and Sirima among the laywomen. He was King Vijitavi and of Candavati.
