= Buddhahood =

Condition of being fully spiritually awakened in Buddhism

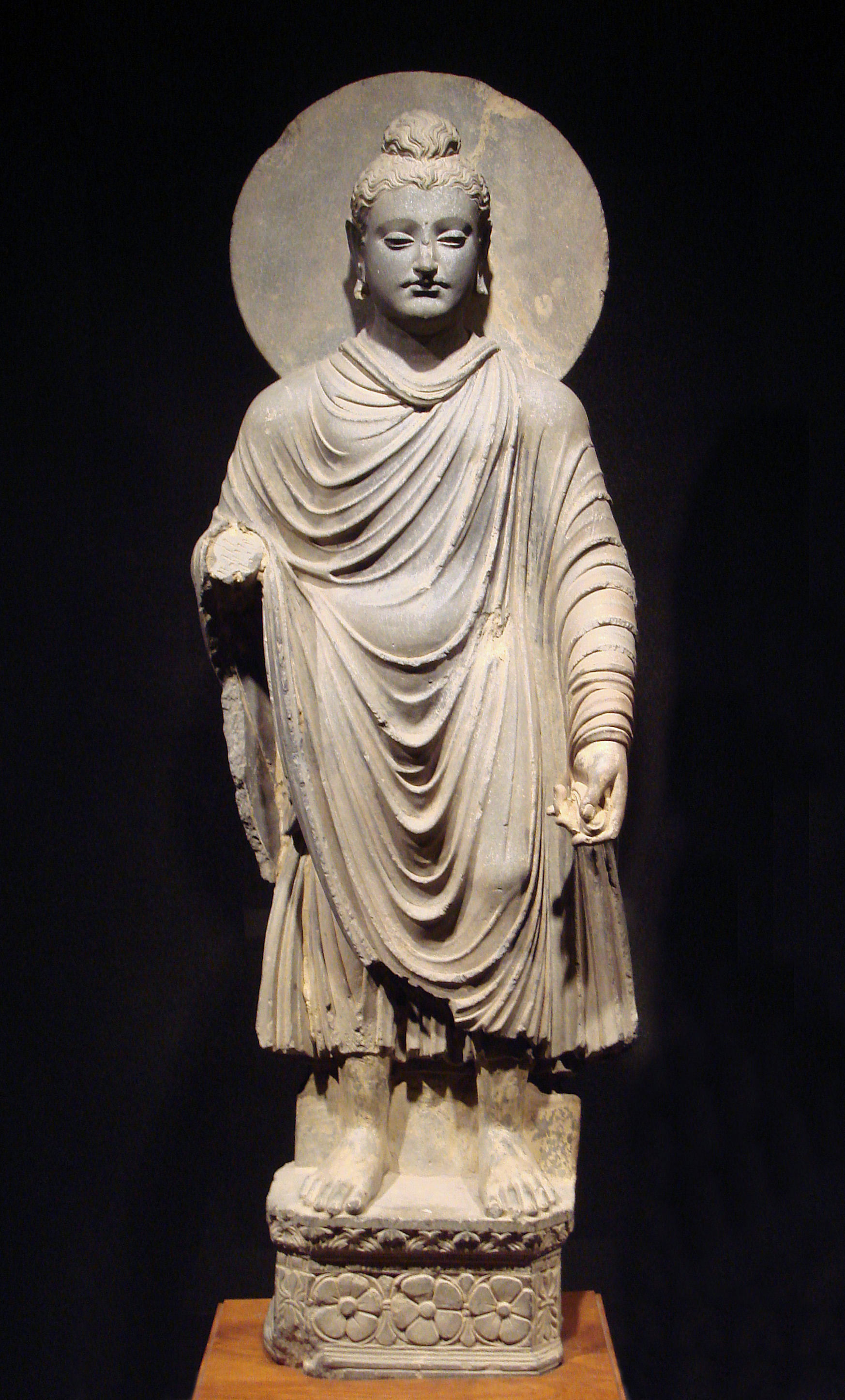
Buddha Śākyamuni, in Greco-Buddhist style, c. 1st–2nd century CE, Gandhara

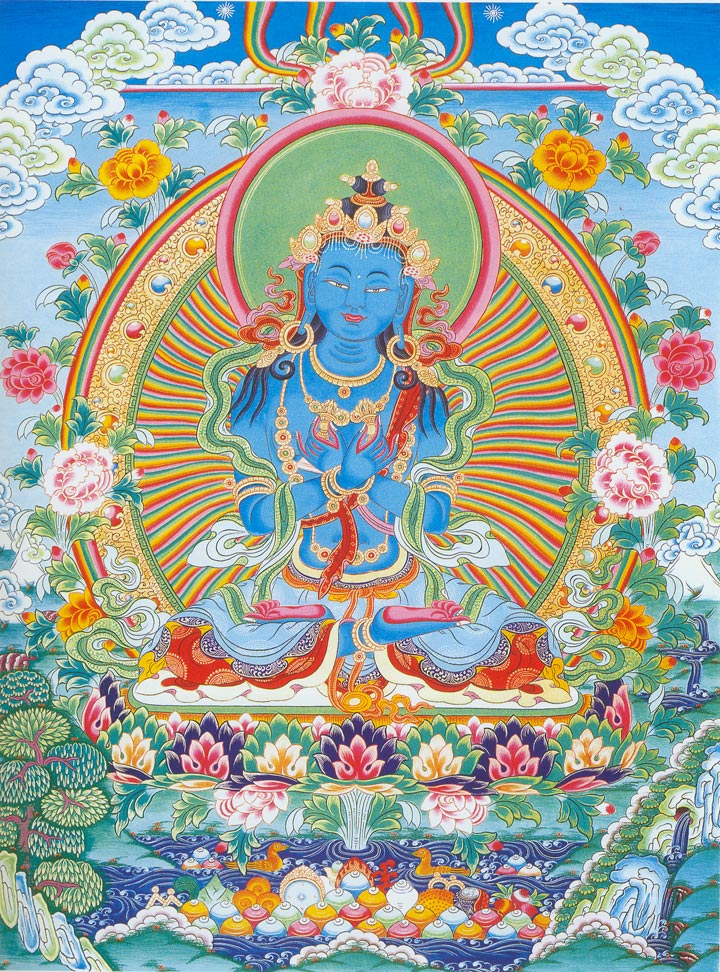
A painting of the primordial Buddha, Vajradhāra, of Tibetan Buddhism

In Buddhism, Buddha (/ˈbuːdə, ˈbʊdə/, which in classic Indic languages means "awakened one") is a title for those who are spiritually awake or enlightened, and have thus attained the supreme goal of Buddhism, variously described as awakening or enlightenment (bodhi), Nirvāṇa ("blowing out"), and liberation (vimokṣa). A Buddha is also someone who fully understands the Dhārma, the true nature of all things or phenomena (dhārmata), the ultimate truth. Buddhahood (Sanskrit: buddhatva; Pali: buddhatta or buddhabhāva; Chinese: 成佛) is the condition and state of being a Buddha. This highest spiritual state of being is also termed sammā-sambodhi (Sanskrit: samyaksaṃbodhi; "full, complete awakening" or “complete, perfect enlightenment”) and is interpreted in many different ways across schools of Buddhism.

The title of "Buddha" is most commonly used for Gautama Buddha, the historical founder of Buddhism, who is often simply known as "the Buddha". The title is also used for other sentient beings who have achieved awakening or enlightenment (bodhi) and liberation (vimokṣa), such as the other human Buddhas who achieved enlightenment before Gautama; members of the Five Buddha Families such as Amitābha; and the bodhisattva Maitreya, known as the "Buddha of the future who will attain awakening at a future time."

In Theravāda Buddhism, a Buddha is commonly understood as a being with the deepest spiritual wisdom about the true nature of reality, who has transcended rebirth and all causes of suffering (duḥkha). He is also seen as having many miraculous and magical powers. However, a living Buddha has the limitations of a physical body, will feel pain, get old, and eventually die like other sentient beings. In Mahāyāna Buddhism, any Buddha is considered to be a transcendent being with extensive powers, who is all-knowing, immeasurably powerful, with an eternal lifespan. His wisdom light is said to pervade the cosmos, and his great compassion and skillful means are limitless. This transcendent being is not understood as having a normal physical human body; instead, Mahāyāna Buddhism defends a kind of docetism, in which Gautama Buddha's life on earth was a magical display which only appeared to have a human body.

A sentient being who is on the path to become a Buddha is called a bodhisattva. In Mahāyāna Buddhism, Buddhahood is the universal goal and all Mahāyānists ultimately aim at becoming a Buddha, in order to benefit and liberate all sentient beings. Thus, Buddhahood is the goal for all the various spiritual paths found in the various Mahāyāna traditions (including Tantric Buddhism, Zen, and Pure Land). This contrasts with the common Theravādin goal of individual liberation, or arhatship.

== Definition ==
Buddhahood is the state of an awakened being, who, having found the path of cessation of suffering (duḥkha) ,(as originated from attachment to fetters and hindrances, distorted perception and thinking), is in the state of "no-more-Learning".

Buddhism is devoted primarily to awakening or enlightenment (bodhi), Nirvāṇa ("blowing out"), and liberation (vimokṣa) from all causes of suffering (duḥkha) due to the existence of sentient beings in saṃsāra (the cycle of compulsory birth, death, and rebirth) through the threefold trainings (ethical conduct, meditative absorption, and wisdom). Classical Indian Buddhism emphasized the importance of the individual's self-cultivation (through numerous spiritual practices like keeping ethical precepts, Buddhist meditation, and worship) in the process of liberation from the defilements which keep us bound to the cycle of rebirth. According to the standard Buddhist scholastic understanding, liberation arises when the proper elements (dhārmata) are cultivated and when the mind has been purified of its attachment to fetters and hindrances that produce unwholesome mental factors (various called defilements, poisons, or fluxes).

There is a broad spectrum of opinion on the nature of Buddhahood, its universality, and the method of attaining Buddhahood among the various schools of Buddhism. The level to which this manifestation requires ascetic practices varies from none at all to an absolute requirement, dependent on doctrine. In Mahāyāna Buddhism, Buddhahood is the universal goal and all Mahāyānists ultimately aim at becoming a Buddha, in order to benefit and liberate all sentient beings. While most Mahāyāna Buddhist schools accept the bodhisattva ideal, in which it takes aeons to reach Buddhahood, not all agree that everyone can become a Buddha or that the path to Buddhahood must necessarily take aeons.

In Theravāda Buddhism, Buddha refers to one who has reached awakening or enlightenment (bodhi) through their own efforts and insight, without a teacher to point out the Dhārma. A samyaksaṃbuddha ("full, complete Buddha") re-discovers the Four Noble Truths and the Noble Eightfold Path to awakening on their own, and then teaches these to others after his awakening. A pratyekabuddha ("solitary Buddha") also reaches Nirvāṇa through his own efforts, but is unable or unwilling to teach the Dhārma to others. An arhat ("saint") needs to follow the teaching of a Buddha to attain Nirvāṇa, and may also preach the Dhārma after attaining Nirvāṇa. In one instance the term Buddha is also used in Theravādin literature to refer to all who attain Nirvāṇa, using the term śrāvakabuddha to designate an arhat, someone who depends on the teachings of a Buddha to attain Nirvāṇa. In this broader sense it is equivalent to the arhat.

In Mahāyāna Buddhism, a Buddha is seen as a transcendent being with extensive powers, who is all-knowing, immeasurably powerful, with an eternal lifespan, and whose awakened wisdom (buddha-jñana) is all pervasive. This view can be found in numerous Mahāyāna texts, such as the Avataṃsaka Sūtra. Mahāyāna buddhology mainly understands the Buddha through the "three bodies" (Trikāya) framework. In this framework, the historical Buddha or other Buddhas who appear human are understood docetically as magical "transformation bodies" (Nirmāṇakāya). Meanwhile, the real or ultimate Buddha is the Dharmakāya, the body of ultimate reality. Thus, the Ratnagotravibhāga (Analysis of the Jeweled Lineage), a key Mahāyāna treatise, defines the Buddha as "the uncompounded (asamskrta), and spontaneous (anabhoga) Dharmakāya" and as "self-enlightened and self-arisen wisdom (jñana), compassion and power for the benefit of others." This ultimate awakened reality is understood and interpreted in numerous different ways by the different Mahāyāna schools.

The doctrine of Buddha-nature (tathāgatagarbha) in Mahāyāna Buddhism also consider Buddhahood to be a universal and innate property which is immanent in all sentient beings. Most Buddhists do not consider Gautama Buddha to have been the only Buddha. The Pāli Canon refers to many previous ones (see list of the named Buddhas), while the Mahāyāna texts additionally have many Buddhas of celestial origin (see Amitābha or Vairocana as examples; for lists of many thousands of Buddha names, see Taishō Tripiṭaka, numbers 439–448).

== Views about the Buddhas ==
=== A Buddha as a supreme person ===
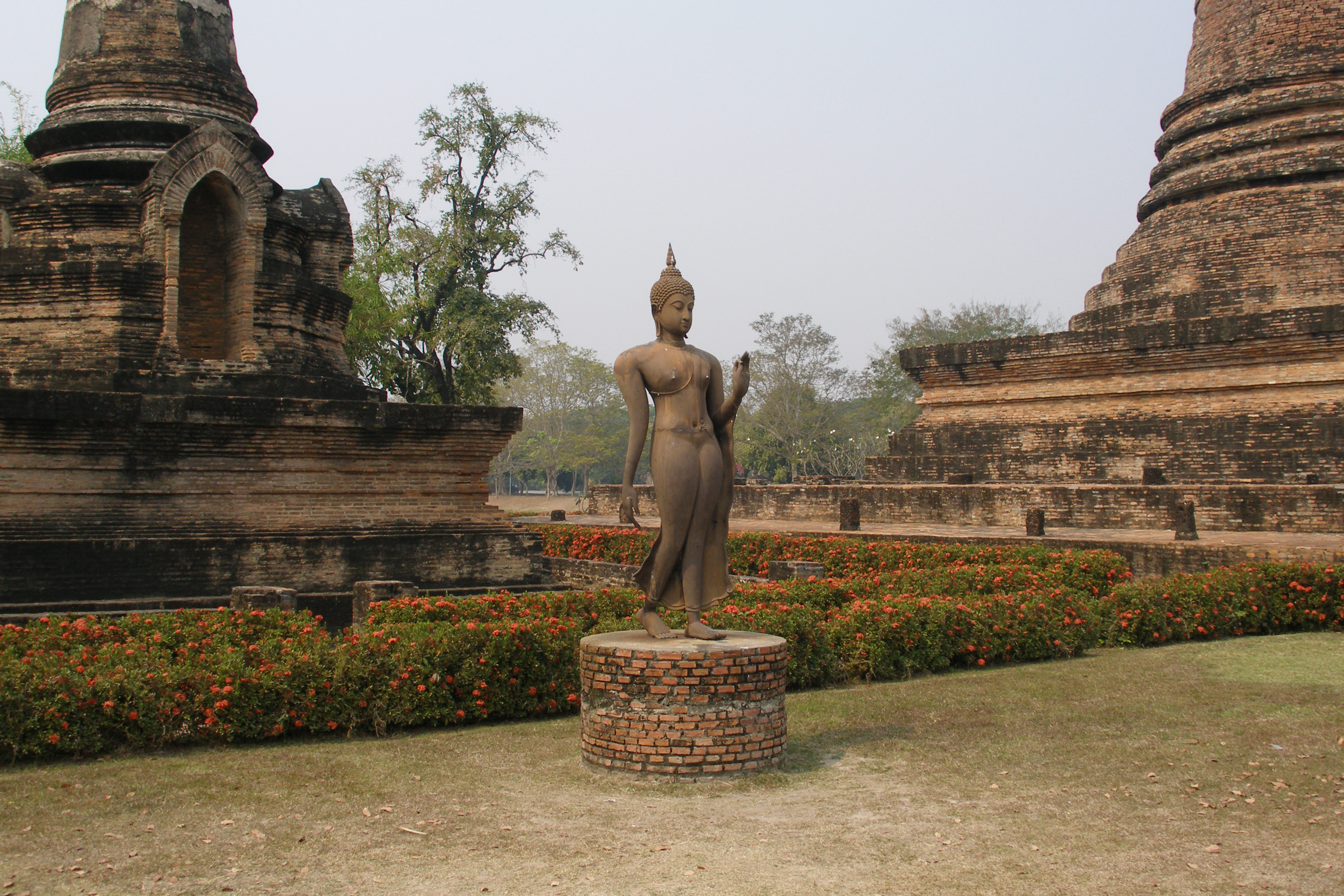
A classic Sukhothai-style Buddha statue

The Theravāda Buddhist tradition generally sees the Buddha as a supreme person who is neither a God in the theistic sense, nor a deva, nor a regular human. Thus, the Buddha is seen as a very special and unique class of persons called a "great person" (mahāpurisa).

Andrew Skilton writes that the Buddha was never historically regarded by Buddhist traditions as being merely human. Instead, he is seen as having many supranormal powers (siddhi), such as the superknowledges (abhijñā), the capacity for a very long lifespan, as well as the thirty-two marks of a great man.

In the Pāli Canon, the Buddha is depicted as someone between a human and a divine being. He has a human body that decays and dies, and he was born from human parents (though some sources depict this as a miraculous birth). The most important element of a Buddha is that they have attained the supreme spiritual goal: Nirvāṇa. This is what makes him supreme and what grants him special powers. This view of the Buddha as supreme person with many superpowers, but which has a physical body that has many limitations of a human form was also shared by other early Buddhist schools, like the Sarvāstivāda and the Dharmaguptaka.

In the Doṇa Sutta (AN 4:36), the Buddha is asked whether he was a deva or a human, and he replies that he had eliminated the deep-rooted unconscious traits that would make him either one, and should instead be called a Buddha: one who had grown up in the world but had now gone beyond it, as a lotus flower grows from the water but blossoms above it, unsoiled.

The Pāli Canon also states that Gautama Buddha is known as being a "teacher of the gods and humans", superior to both the gods (devas) and humans since he has attained the highest liberation, whereas the gods are still subject to attachment, ignorance, anger, fear, and sorrow. In the Madhupindika Sutta (MN 18), Buddha is described in powerful terms, such as the "Lord of the Dhārma" and the bestower of immortality.

Similarly, in the Anuradha Sutta (SN 44.2), Gautama Buddha is described as the "supreme man" and the "attainer of the superlative attainment". Because he has attained the highest spiritual knowledge, the Buddha is also identified with the Dhārma (the most fundamental reality) In the Vakkali Sutta (SN 22.87).

=== A Buddha as a transcendent and supramundane being ===
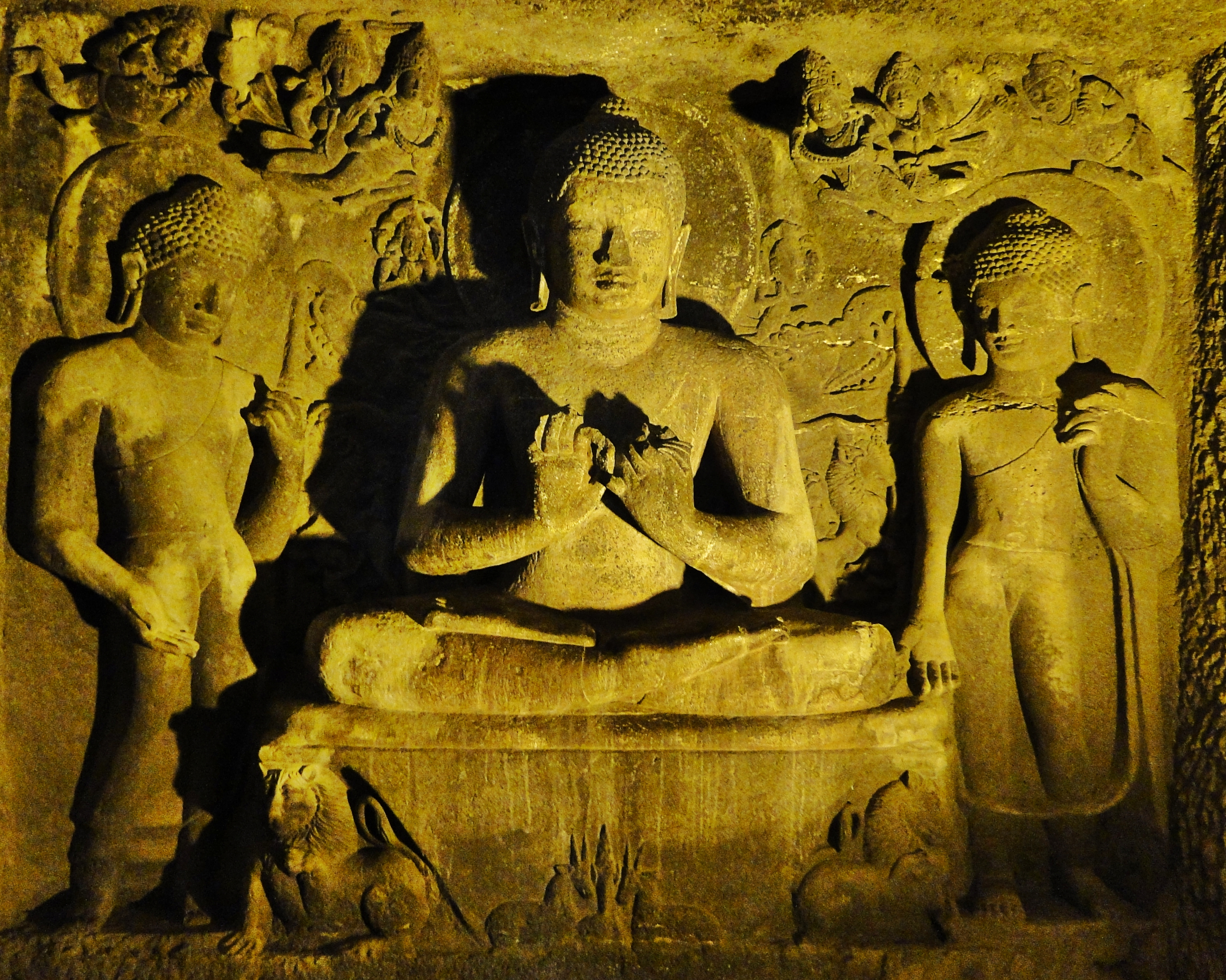
Buddha statue on the upper floor of Ajanta Cave No. 6. These caves are associated with the Mahāsāṃghika school.

In the early Buddhist schools, the Mahāsāṃghika branch regarded the buddhas as being characterized primarily by their supramundane (lokottara) nature. The Mahāsāṃghikas advocated the transcendental and supramundane nature of the buddhas and bodhisattvas and the fallibility of arhats. Of the 48 special theses attributed by the Indian scholar Vasumitra to the Mahāsāṃghika sects of Ekavyāvahārika, Lokottaravāda, and Kukkuṭika, 20 points concern the supramundane nature of buddhas and bodhisattvas. According to Vasumitra, these four groups held that the Buddha is able to know all dharmas in a single moment of the mind. Yao Zhihua writes:

In their view, the Buddha is equipped with the following supernatural qualities: transcendence (lokottara), lack of defilements, all of his utterances preaching his teaching, expounding all his teachings in a single utterance, all of his sayings being true, his physical body being limitless, his power (prabhāva) being limitless, the length of his life being limitless, never tiring of enlightening sentient beings and awakening pure faith in them, having no sleep or dreams, no pause in answering a question, and always in meditation (samādhi).

A doctrine ascribed to the Mahāsāṃghikas is, "The power of the tathāgatas is unlimited, and the life of the buddhas is unlimited." According to Guang Xing, two main aspects of the Buddha can be seen in Mahāsāṃghika teachings: the true Buddha who is omniscient and immeasurably powerful, and the manifested forms through which he liberates sentient beings through skillful means. For the Mahāsaṃghikas, the historical Gautama Buddha was one of these transformation bodies (Skt. nirmāṇakāya), while the essential real Buddha is equated with the Dharmakāya.

As in Mahāyāna traditions, the Mahāsāṃghikas held the doctrine of the existence of many contemporaneous Buddhas throughout the ten directions. In the Mahāsāṃghika Lokānuvartana Sūtra, it is stated, "The Buddha knows all the dharmas of the countless buddhas of the ten directions." It is also stated, "All buddhas have one body, the body of the Dharma." The concept of many bodhisattvas simultaneously working toward Buddhahood is also found among the Mahāsāṃghika tradition, and further evidence of this is given in the Samayabhedoparacanacakra, which describes the doctrines of the Mahāsāṃghikas.

Guang Xing writes that the Acchariyābbhūtasutta of the Majjhima Nikāya along with its Chinese Madhyamāgama parallel is the most ancient source for the Mahāsāṃghika view. The sūtra mentions various miracles performed by Buddha Śākyamuni before his birth and after. The Chinese version even calls him Bhagavan, which suggests the idea that the Buddha was already awakened before descending down to earth to be born.

Similarly, the idea that the lifespan of a Buddha is limitless is also based on ancient ideas, such as the Mahāparinirvānasūtra's statement that the Buddha's lifespan is as long as an eon (kalpa) but that he voluntarily allowed his life to end. Another early source for the Mahāsāṃghika view that a Buddha was a transcendent being is the idea of the thirty-two major marks of a Buddha's body. Furthermore, the Simpsapa sutta states that the Buddha had way more knowledge than what he taught to his disciples. The Mahāsāṃghikas took this further and argued that the Buddha knew the dharmas of innumerable other Buddhas of the ten directions.

==== Buddhahood in Mahāyāna Buddhism ====
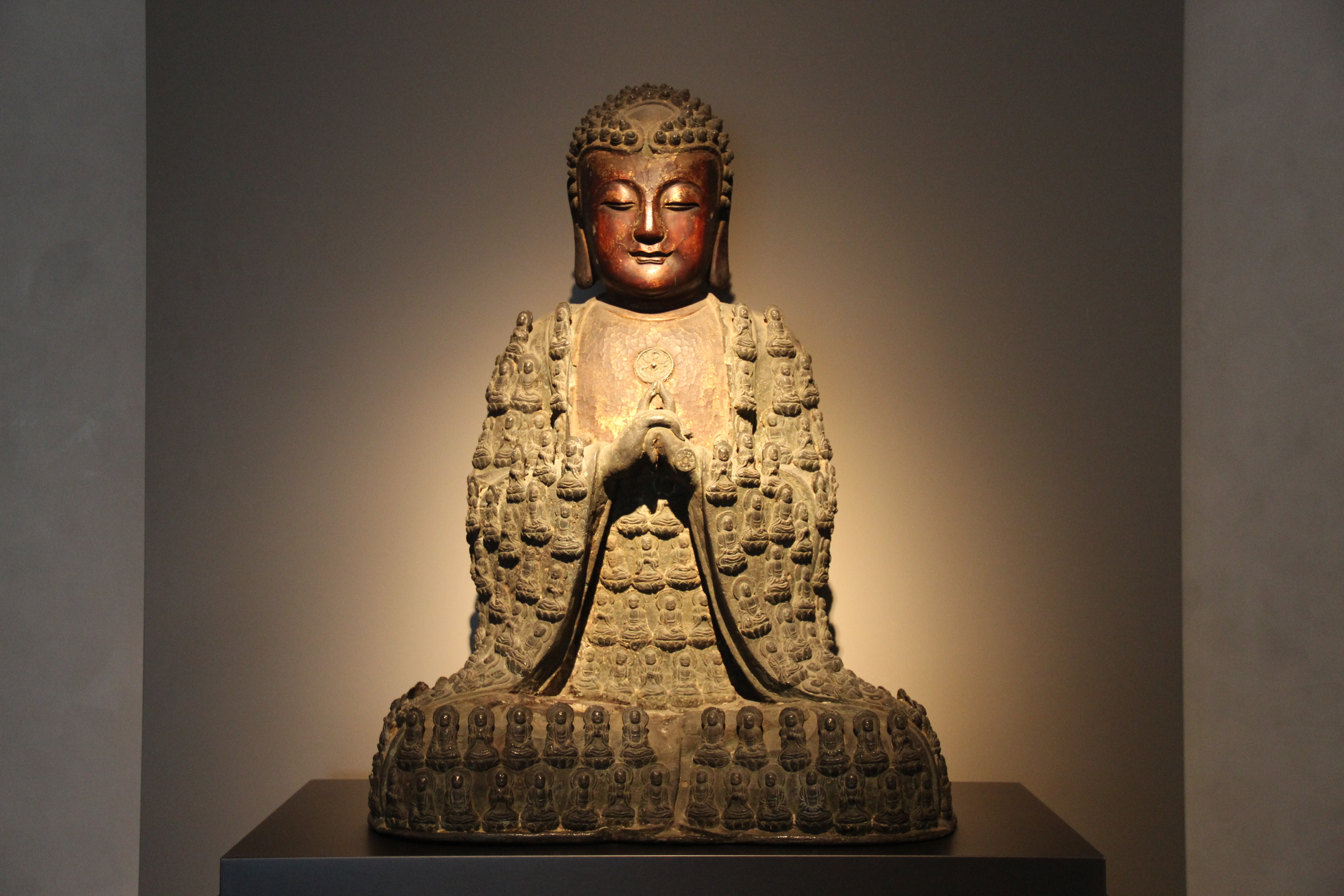
A Ming Bronze of the supreme cosmic Buddha Vairocana ("The Illuminator"). The bronze depicts the cosmic body of Vairocana (which is equal to the universe itself) and also depicts the numerous manifestations (nirmanakayas) of Vairocana (the small Buddhas covering his body).

Mahāyāna Buddhism generally follows the Mahāsāṃghika ideal of the Buddha being a transcendent and all-knowing (sarvajña) being with unlimited spiritual powers. Guang Xing describes the Buddha in Mahāyāna as an omnipotent and almighty divinity "endowed with numerous supernatural attributes and qualities". Mahāyāna cosmology also includes innumerable Buddhas who reside in innumerable buddha fields (buddha kshetra). The Mahāyāna Lotus Sūtra, for example, says the lifespan of the Buddha is immeasurable. It also says that the Buddha actually achieved Buddhahood countless eons (kalpas) ago and has already been teaching the Dharma through his numerous manifestations (nirmana) for eons.

In spite of this transcendent nature, Mahāyāna also affirms the immanent nature of Buddhahood in all beings (through the doctrine of Buddha-nature, which is seen as something that all beings have). This view of an immanent Buddha essence in all normal human beings is common throughout East Asian Buddhism.

The myriad Buddhas are also seen as active in the world, guiding all sentient beings to Buddhahood. Paul Williams writes that the Buddha in Mahāyāna is "a spiritual king, relating to and caring for the world". This view entails a kind of docetism regarding the "historical" Buddha, Shakyamuni. His life and death were a "mere appearance," like a magic show; in reality, the Buddha still exists and is constantly helping living beings.

Because of this transcendental view, Mahāyāna Buddhologies have sometimes been compared to various types of theism (including pantheism) by different scholars. There is disagreement among scholars regarding this issue, as well on the general relationship between Buddhism and theism.

Since Buddhas remain accessible, a Mahāyānist can direct prayers to them, as well as experience visions and revelations from them. This has been very influential in the history of Mahāyāna Buddhism. Furthermore, a Mahāyāna devotee can also aspire to be reborn in a Buddha's Pure Land or Buddha field (buddhakṣetra), where they can strive towards Buddhahood in the best possible conditions. This practice is the central element of East Asian Pure Land Buddhism.

=== The Buddha as just a wise human ===
Some modern Buddhists have argued that the Buddha was just a human being, albeit a very wise one. This is a common view in Buddhist modernism, which sought to teach a form of Buddhism that was modern, rational and scientific. One figure who sees Buddha as mainly human is Thích Nhất Hạnh, a Vietnamese Buddhist monk in the Zen tradition, who states that "Buddha was not a god. He was a human being like you and me, and he suffered just as we do."

In a similar fashion, Jack Maguire, a Western monk of the Mountains and Rivers Order in New York, writes that Buddha is inspirational based on his humanness:

A fundamental part of Buddhism's appeal to billions of people over the past two and a half millennia is the fact that the central figure, commonly referred to by the title "Buddha", was not a god, or a special kind of spiritual being, or even a prophet or an emissary of one. On the contrary, he was a human being like the rest of us who quite simply woke up to full aliveness.

== Nature of the Buddha ==
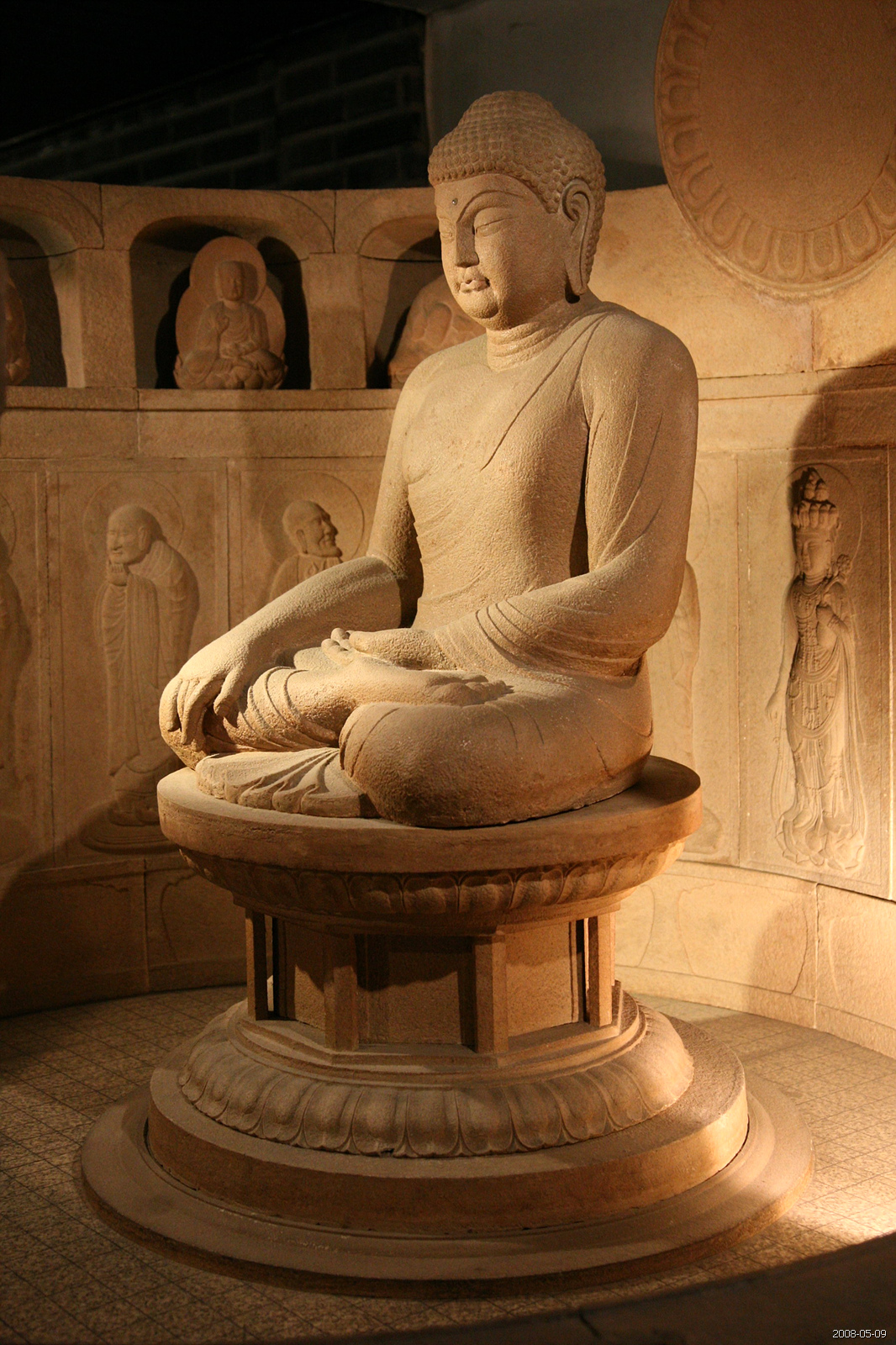
Seated Shakyamuni Buddha, Seokguram cave, Korea.

The various Buddhist schools hold some varying interpretations on the nature of Buddha. All Buddhist traditions hold that a Buddha is fully awakened and has completely purified his mind of the three poisons of craving, aversion and ignorance. A Buddha is no longer bound by saṃsāra, and has ended the suffering which unawakened people experience in life.

Most schools of Buddhism have also held that the Buddha was omniscient. However, the early texts contain explicit repudiations of making this claim of the Buddha.

Mahāyāna buddhology expands the powers of a Buddha exponentially, seeing them as having unlimited lifespan and all-pervasive omniscient wisdom, as omnipotent, and as able to produce an infinite number of magical manifestations (nirmanakayas) as well as being able to produce pure lands (heaven-like realms for bodhisattvas).

=== The classic superknowledges ===
The Early Buddhist texts (and other later sources as well) contain a classic list of "supernormal knowledges" (Skt. abhijñā, Pali: abhiññā) that a Buddha has attained through spiritual practice.

There is an ancient list of "six classes of superknowledge" (Pali: chalabhiññā, Skt. ṣaḍabhijña) that Buddhas have which are found in various Buddhist sources. These are:

1. "Higher powers" (P: iddhi, S: ṛddhi), such as walking on water and through walls; flight, becoming invisible and creating mind made bodies.
2. "Divine ear" (Pali: dibbasota), that is, clairaudience which extends in the human realm as well as into the other realms, like the realms of the gods (devas).
3. "Mind-penetrating knowledge" (cetopariyañāṇa), that is, telepathy;
4. "Remember one's former abodes" (pubbenivāsanussati), recalling one's own past lives stretching back eons into the past.
5. "Divine eye" (dibbacakkhu), that is, knowing others' karmic destinations (where they will be reborn); and,
6. "Knowledge of the destruction of the mental pollutants" (āsavakkhaya), which is the eradication of all negative mental states and the ending of suffering. This knowledge is the "liberation of the mind" (Pali: cetovimutti, Skt. cittavimukti).

=== Miraculous displays ===
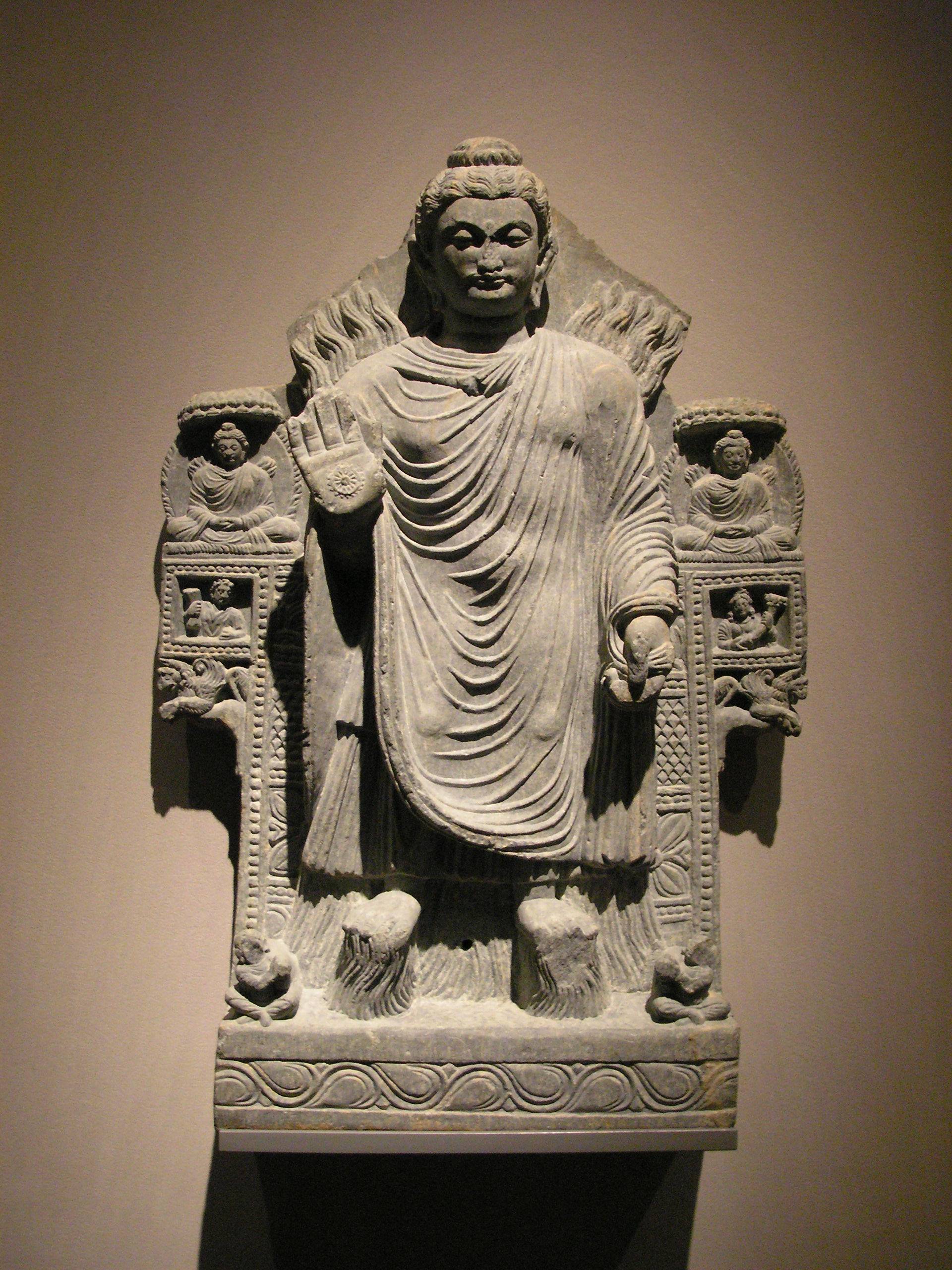
Shakyamuni Buddha demonstrating control over the fire and water elements. Gandhara, 3rd century CE.

Buddhist texts include numerous stories of the Buddha's miracles, which include displays of the abhiññās, healings, elemental magic (such as manipulating fire and water), and various other supernatural phenomena, traveling to higher realms of Buddhist cosmology, and others.

One of the most famous of these miracles was the Twin Miracle at Sāvatthī, in which the Buddha emitted fire from the top of his body and water from his lower body simultaneously, before alternating them and then expanding them to illuminate the cosmos.

Mahayana sūtras contain even more extensive miracles. In the Vimalakirti Sūtra, the Buddha display the true pure nature of his "buddha field" to everyone on earth, who suddenly beholds the world as a perfect world filled with jewels and other majestic features. Likewise, in the Lotus Sūtra, the Buddha shakes the earth and shines a beam of light which illuminates thousands of "buddha-fields".

=== Ten epithets of a Buddha ===
Some Buddhists meditate on (or contemplate) the Buddha as having ten characteristics (Ch./Jp. 十號). These characteristics are frequently mentioned in the Pāli Canon as well as in other early Buddhist sources as well as in Mahayana texts, and are chanted daily in many Buddhist monasteries. The ten epithets are:

1. Thus gone, thus come (Skt: tathāgata)
2. Worthy one (Skt: arhat)
3. Perfectly self-enlightened (Skt: samyak-saṃbuddha)
4. Perfected in knowledge and conduct (Skt: vijya-carana-sampanno )
5. Well gone (Skt: sugato)
6. Knower of the world (Skt: lokavidu)
7. Unsurpassed leader of persons to be tamed (Skt: anuttaro-puriṣa-damma-sārathi)
8. Teacher of the gods and humans (Skt: śaththa deva-manuṣsāṇaṃ)
9. The Enlightened One (Skt: buddha)
10. The Blessed One or fortunate one (Skt: bhagavat)

The tenth epithet is sometimes listed as "The World Honored Enlightened One" (Skt. Buddha-Lokanatha) or "The Blessed Enlightened One" (Skt. Buddha-Bhagavan).

=== Acts of a Buddha ===
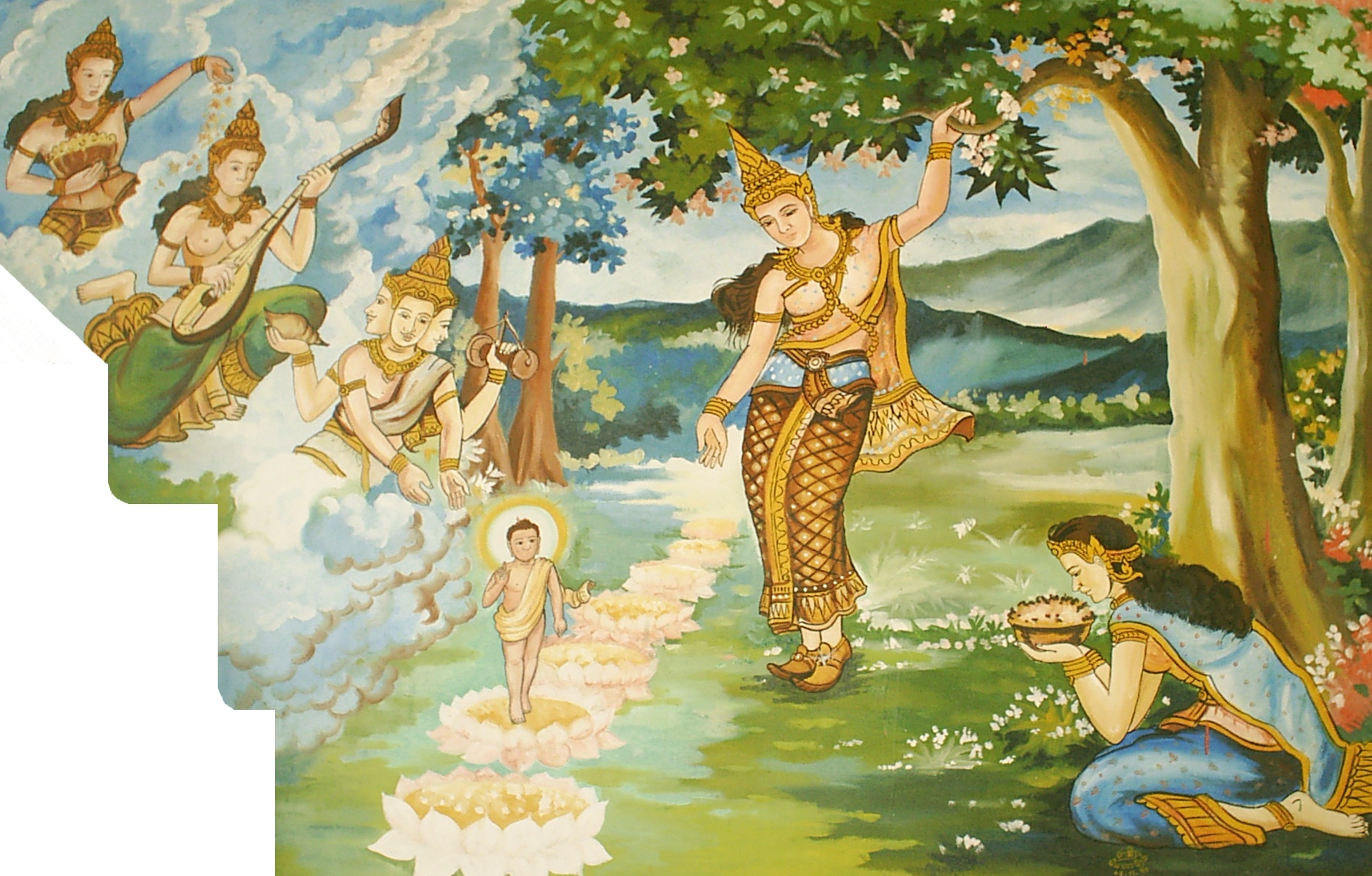
A painting of the miraculous birth of the Buddha

According to various Buddhist texts, upon reaching Buddhahood each Buddha performs various acts (buddhacarita) during his life to complete his duty as a Buddha.

The Mahayana tradition generally follows the list of "Twelve Great Buddha Acts" (Skt. dvadaśabuddhakārya). These are:

1. A Buddha must descend from Tushita heaven and transfer his throne to the next future Buddha.
2. A Buddha must enter his mothers womb.
3. A Buddha must be born (generally accompanied by miracles).
4. A Buddha must master numerous arts and skills in his youth.
5. A Buddha must live in the palace and enjoy his life with his wife.
6. A Buddha must make a great departure from his palace and become a renunciant (sramana).
7. A Buddha must practice asceticism.
8. A Buddha must sit under a buddha tree (like the bodhi tree) on a bodhimanda (place of awakening)
9. A Buddha must defeat the demonic forces of Mara.
10. A Buddha must attain and manifest full awakening.
11. A Buddha must give his first sermon, and thus turn the wheel of the Dharma.
12. A Buddha must die and pass into Nirvana, demonstrating liberation and impermanence.

The Pali suttas do not have such a list, but the Theravada commentarial tradition lists 30 obligatory acts of a Buddha.

=== Attributes of a Buddha in Mahāyāna ===
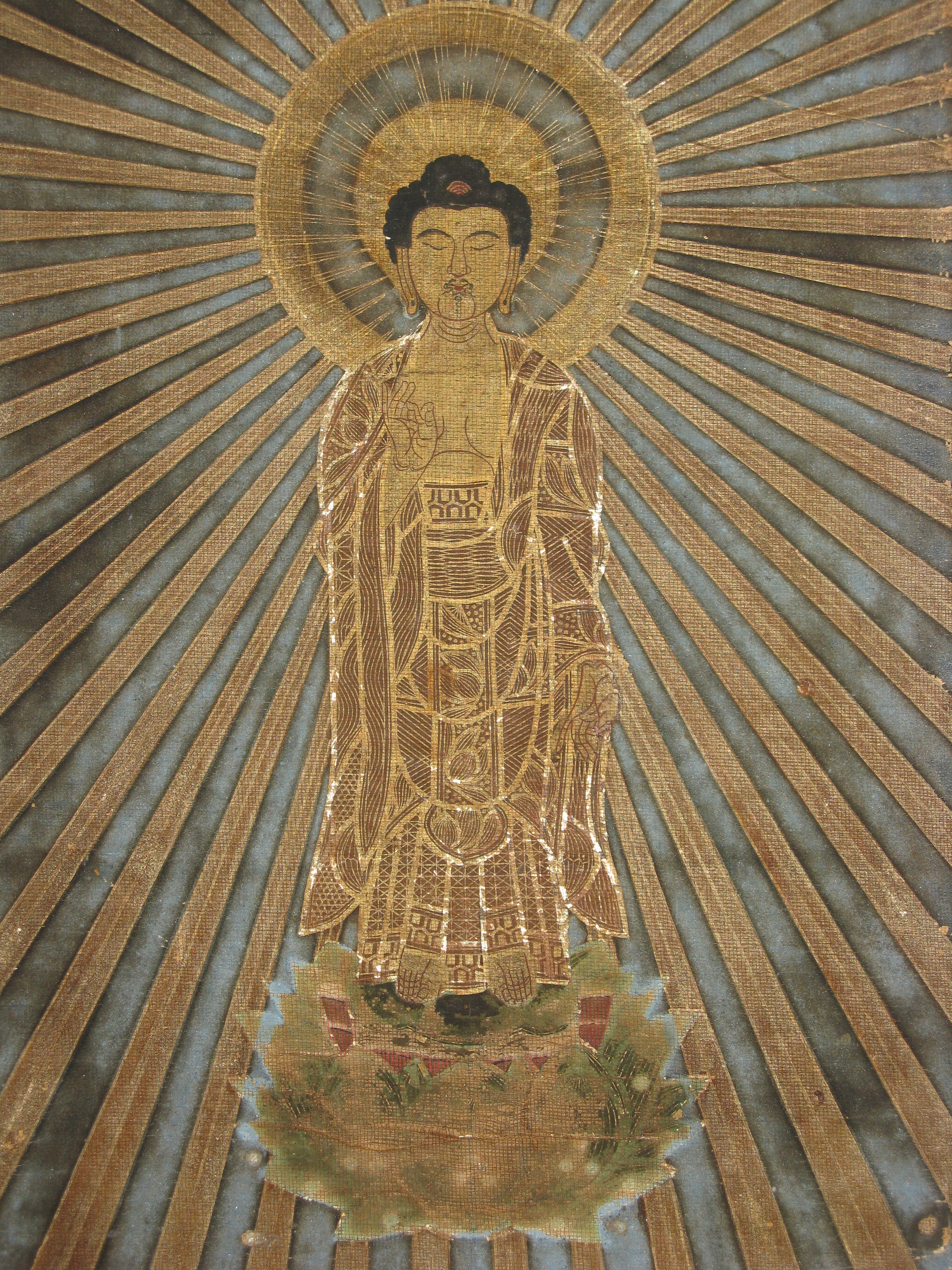
"Amida Manifesting in the Dharma-body of Expedient Means", Japanese painting, at the Met.

Various Mahayana sūtras and treatises contain explanations of the nature of a Buddha and the various attributes which Buddhas are said to have. These attributes are significantly different and more exalted than the way a Buddha is understood in non-Mahayana Buddhism.

Some of the key attributes of Buddhahood in Mahayana buddhology include:

- Triple body (Trikāya): This is the central Mahayana buddhological theory which states that a Buddha has three aspects, or functions (Sanskrit: vṛṭṭis): the Dharmakāya (Sanskrit; Dharma body, the ultimate reality, the true nature of all things), the Sambhogakāya (the body of self-enjoyment, a blissful divine body with infinite forms and powers) and the Nirmāṇakāya (manifestation body, the body which appears in the everyday world and presents the semblance of a human body).
- Eternity and Immutability: In its ultimate aspect (i.e. Dharmakāya), Buddhahood is said to be unchanging, non-arising, un-created, eternal, permanent (nitya) and unceasing. Various sources like the Lotus Sūtra also indicate the Buddha's lifespan (ayus) is also immeasurable or eternal ("ever enduring, never perishing"). Furthermore, in Mahayana, Buddhahood is also understood as timeless, beyond any concept of past, present or future, since any concept of time is a mental construction.
- Beyond thought: A Buddha has no thoughts or ordinary cognition (samjña), he does not plan, conceptualize, think (amanasikāra). His mind is beyond all mental proliferation (nisprapañca). Instead, Buddhahood naturally and spontaneously manifests myriad skillful means to benefit all beings in an automatic manner without any thought or planning. Thus he is said to have a mind which is no-mind (Sanskrit: acitta) or without discrimination (nirvikalpa).
- Wordless Teaching: Various sūtras, like the Tathāgataguhya Sūtra, state that the Buddha "has never once uttered a single word" since Buddha is always in a state of meditative samadhi. In spite of this, the Buddha manifests innumerable skillful means that magically appears to all sentient beings as various teachings appropriate specifically for them, in whatever language or sound they can understand.
- All-knowing wisdom: Buddha's knowledge and wisdom is said to be all-knowing (Sanskrit: sarvajña), i.e. omniscient. This is because a Buddha knows the true nature of all reality as well as all phenomena (dharmas).
- All-pervasive: Sūtras like the Avatamsaka Sūtra state that Buddha's light and wisdom is all pervasive and omnipresent throughout out the cosmos. As such, Buddhahood is present everywhere, including in the minds of all beings as buddha-nature. However, most beings do not detect Buddha's presence, because their minds are deluded and clouded over by defilements.
- Measureless Power: Buddha's power (anubhāva, adhiṣṭhāna) is said to be immeasurably vast, though not claimed to be omnipotent per se. This power is able to influence and help liberate sentient beings in different ways. Furthermore, the "power of the [Buddha's] past vows" (pūrva-praṇidhāna-vaśa) can help living beings who call on the Buddha's aid by helping them be reborn in a Pure Land. This idea, also called "other-power", is central to Pure Land Buddhism.
- Great Compassion: Buddha's great compassion (mahākaruṇā) and kindness (maitrī) is universal and embraces all beings in the universe. It is due to this great compassion that the Buddha works to liberate all beings, and will unceasingly continue to manifest immeasurable numbers of emanation bodies (nirmāṇakāyas) and skillful means in order to save all beings.
- Skillful Means (Upaya): Buddha's compassion and love manifests as Buddha's skillful means which take immeasurably many forms. For example, Buddha may appear as a human, any deva, animal, etc. In order to liberate all different types of beings, the Buddha also teaches many paths to awakening (such as the three vehicles), many teachings (such as the three turnings) and many methods of spiritual cultivation.
- Inconceivability: In numerous sources, the Buddha is seen as being inconceivable (acintya), beyond all concepts, indescribable by language, unable to grasped by thought or intellectual understanding. One of the names of the Buddha Amitabha is Acintyaprabha, "Inconceivable Light".
- Purity: Buddhahood is totally beyond the defilements (kleśa) and thus perfectly pure (viśuddhi), unstained (anāśrava), and undefiled (akleśa).
- Non-dual: While Buddhahood is said to transcend the suffering of samsara (the conditioned world), it is also not separate from samsara either, and thus is non-dual (advaya) with the world of suffering. This due to the Mahayana doctrine of "non-abiding nirvana" (apratiṣṭhita-nirvana, also "not-fixed" or "non-localized"), which holds that nirvana is not a state of total transcendence separated from the world, but is also able to freely operate in the world of suffering, ecompassing the entire cosmos and being immanent within it.

== Lists of Buddhas ==
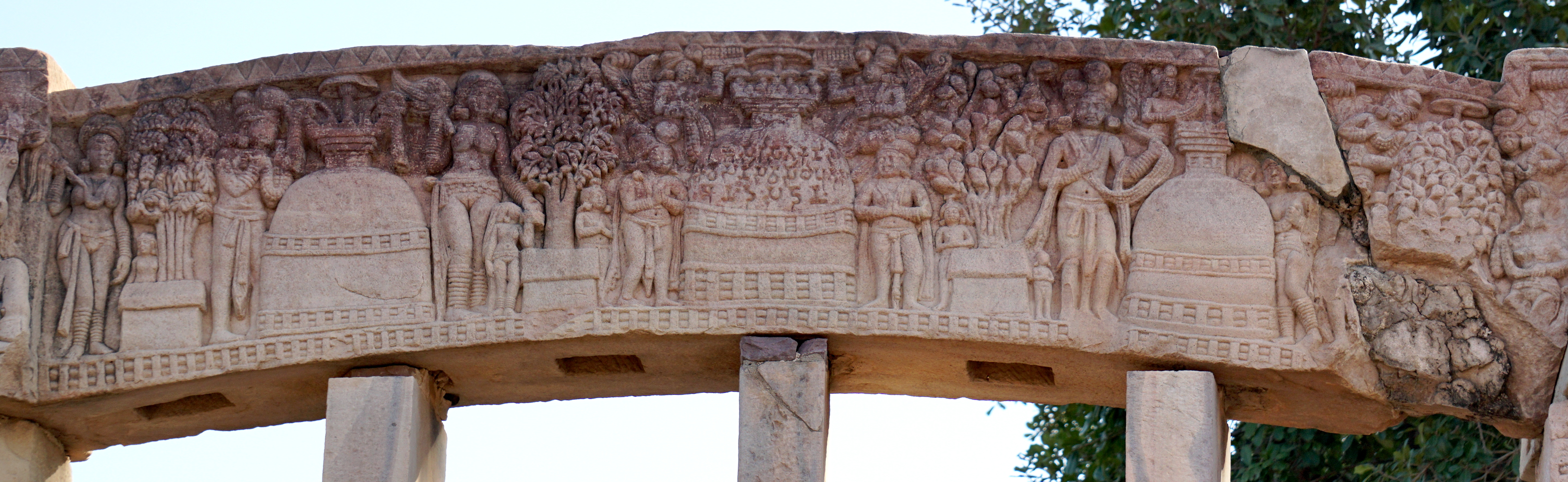
"The Seven Buddhas", at Sanchi (1st century BCE/CE). Six Buddhas of the past are represented, together with the current Buddha, Gautama Buddha, with his Bodhi Tree (at the extreme right). In the central section are three stupas alternating with four trees with thrones in front of them, adored by figures both human and divine. These represent six Buddhas of the past (namely: Vipassī Buddha, Sikhī Buddha, Vessabhū Buddha, Kakusandha Buddha, Koṇāgamana Buddha, and Kassapa Buddha). Three are symbolized by their stupas, and four by the trees under which each respectively attained enlightenment. The tree on the extreme right is the pipal tree of Gautama Buddha and the one next to it is the banyan tree of Kassapa Buddha. The identification of the others is less certain.

=== The Seven Buddhas of Antiquity ===
In the earliest strata of Pali Buddhist texts, especially in the first four Nikayas, only the following seven Buddhas, The Seven Buddhas of Antiquity (Saptatathāgata), are explicitly mentioned and named (see for example SN 12.4 to SN 12.10). Four of these are from the current kalpa (Pali: kappa, meaning "eon" or "age") called the good eon (bhaddakappa) and three are from past eons.

1. Vipassī (lived ninety-one kalpas ago)
2. Sikhī (lived thirty-one kalpas ago)
3. Vessabhū (lived thirty-one kalpas ago in the same kalpa as Sikhī)
4. Kakusandha (the first Buddha of the current good eon)
5. Koṇāgamana (the second Buddha of the current eon)
6. Kassapa (the third Buddha of the current eon)
7. Gautama (the fourth and present Buddha of the current eon)

One sutta called Chakkavatti-Sīhanāda Sutta from an early Buddhist text called the Digha Nikaya also mentions that following the Seven Buddhas of Antiquity, a Buddha named Maitreya is predicted to arise in the world.

However, according to a text in the Theravada Buddhist tradition from a later stratum (between 1st and 2nd century BCE) called the Buddhavamsa, twenty-one more Buddhas were added to the list of seven names in the early texts. Theravada tradition maintains that there can be up to five Buddhas in a kalpa or world age and that the current kalpa has had four Buddhas, with the current Buddha, Gotama, being the fourth and the future Buddha Metteyya being the fifth and final Buddha of the kalpa. This would make the current aeon a bhadrakalpa (fortunate aeon). In some Sanskrit and northern Buddhist traditions however, a bhadrakalpa has up to 1,000 Buddhas, with the Buddhas Gotama and Metteyya also being the fourth and fifth Buddhas of the kalpa respectively.

"Budha-sa Konākamana-sa" ("Of the Kanakamuni Buddha") inscription in Brahmi script, at Nigali Sagar, 250 BCE

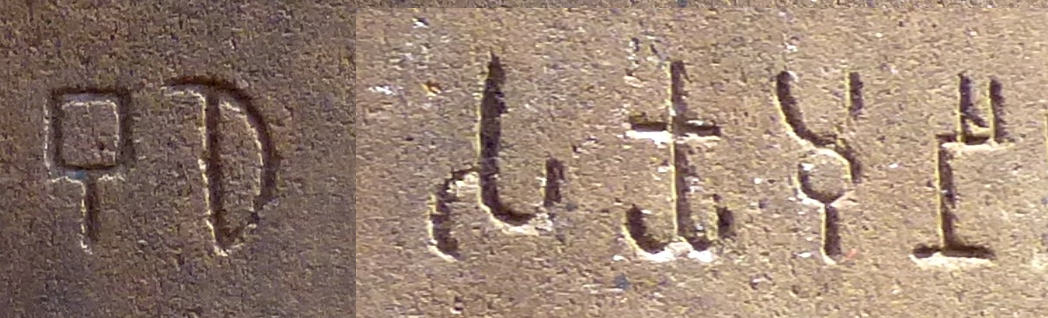
The words "Bu-dhe" and "Sa-kya-mu-nī" in Brahmi script, on the Rummindei pillar of Ashoka.

The Koṇāgamana Buddha, is mentioned in a 3rd-century BCE inscription by Ashoka at Nigali Sagar, in today's Nepal. There is an Ashoka pillar at the site today. Ashoka's inscription in the Brahmi script is on the fragment of the pillar still partly buried in the ground. The inscription made when Emperor Asoka at Nigali Sagar in 249 BCE records his visit, the enlargement of a stupa dedicated to the Kanakamuni Buddha, and the erection of a pillar.

According to Xuanzang, Koṇāgamana's relics were held in a stupa in Nigali Sagar, in what is now Kapilvastu District in southern Nepal.

The historical Buddha, Gautama, also called Shakyamuni ("Sage of the Shakyas"), is mentioned epigraphically on the Pillar of Ashoka at Rummindei (Lumbini in modern Nepal). The Brahmi script inscription on the pillar gives evidence that Ashoka, emperor of the Maurya Empire, visited the place in 3rd-century BCE and identified it as the birth-place of the Buddha.

When King Devānāmpriya Priyadasin had been anointed twenty years, he came himself and worshipped (this spot) because the Buddha Shakyamuni was born here. (He) both caused to be made a stone bearing a horse (?) and caused a stone pillar to be set up, (in order to show) that the Blessed One was born here. (He) made the village of Lummini free of taxes, and paying (only) an eighth share (of the produce).

— The Rummindei Edict, one of the Minor Pillar Edicts of Ashoka.

=== The last 28 Buddhas of Theravāda (aṭavīsi Buddha) ===
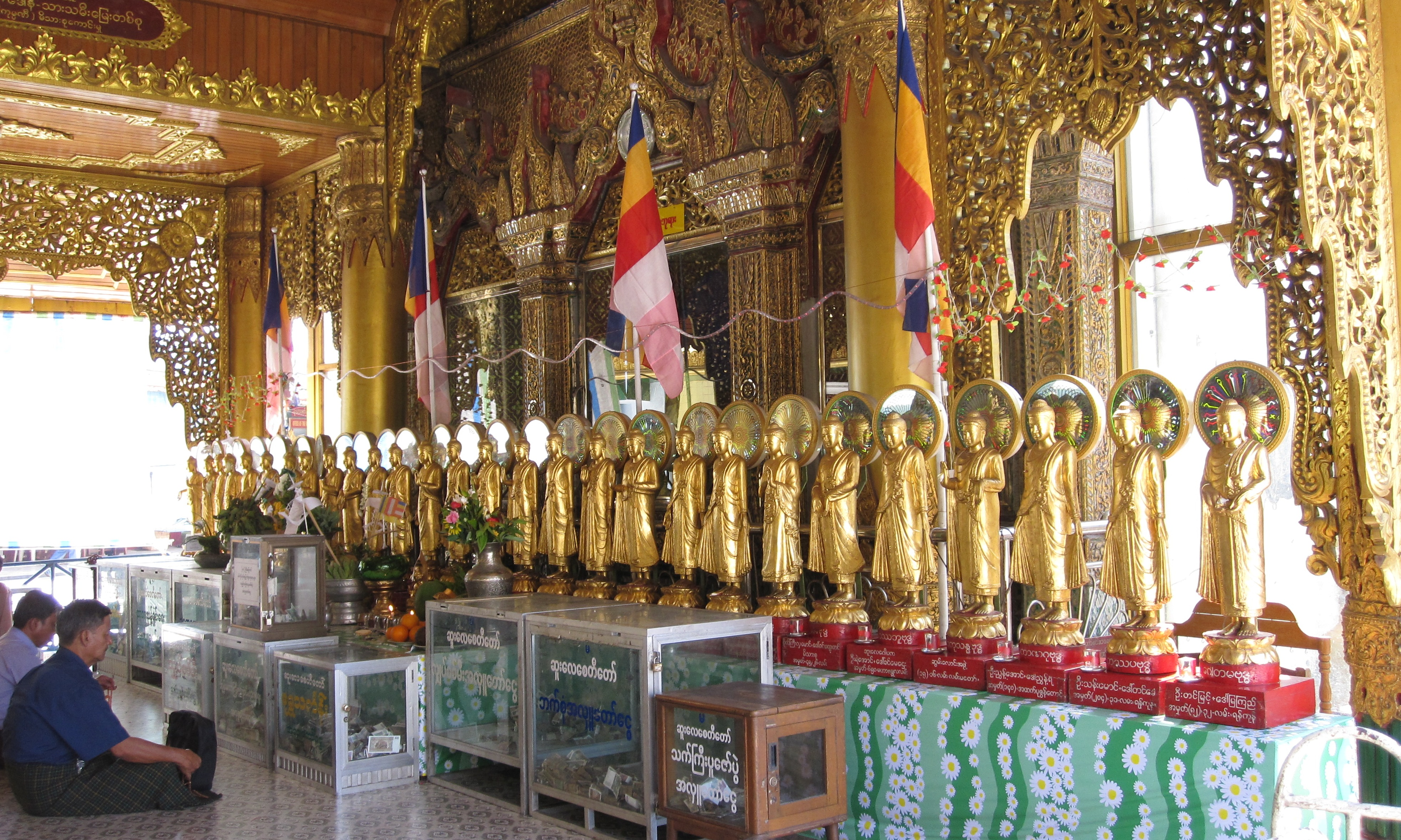
Buddhist men at the Sule Pagoda in Yangon, Myanmar, paying homage to the 29 Buddhas described in Chapter 27 of the Buddhavamsa

The Pali literature of the Theravāda tradition includes tales of 28 previous Buddhas. In countries where Theravāda Buddhism is practiced by the majority of people, such as Sri Lanka, Cambodia, Laos, Myanmar, Thailand, it is customary for Buddhists to hold elaborate festivals, especially during the fair weather season, paying homage to the last 28 Buddhas described in the Buddhavamsa. The Buddhavamsa is a text which describes the life of Gautama Buddha and the 27 Buddhas who preceded him, along with the future Metteyya Buddha. The Buddhavamsa is part of the Khuddaka Nikāya, which in turn is part of the Sutta Piṭaka. The Sutta Piṭaka is one of three main sections of the Pāli Canon.

The first three of these Buddhas—Taṇhaṅkara, Medhaṅkara, and Saraṇaṅkara—lived before the time of Dīpankara Buddha. The fourth Buddha, Dīpankara, is especially important, as he was the Buddha who gave niyatha vivarana (prediction of future Buddhahood) to the Brahmin youth who would in the distant future become the bodhisattva Gautama Buddha. After Dīpankara, 25 more noble people (ariya-puggala) would attain enlightenment before Gautama, the historical Buddha.

Many Buddhists also pay homage to the future Buddha, Maitreya. According to Buddhist scripture, Maitreya will be a successor of Gautama who will appear on Earth, achieve complete enlightenment, and teach the pure Dharma. The prophecy of the arrival of Maitreya is found in the canonical literature of all Buddhist sects (Theravada, Mahayana, and Vajrayana), and is accepted by most Buddhists as a statement about an event that will take place when the Dharma will have been forgotten on Jambudvipa (the terrestrial realm, where ordinary human beings live).

	Pāli name	Sanskrit name	Birthplace	Parents (father - mother)	Bodhirukkha (tree of enlightenment)	Incarnation of Gautama
1	Taṇhaṅkara	Tṛṣṇaṃkara	Puppavadī	Sunanda - Sunandā	Rukkaththana	
2	Medhaṅkara	Medhaṃkara	Yaghara	Sudeva - Yasodharā	Kaela	
3	Saraṇaṅkara	Śaraṇaṃkara	Vipula	Sumaṅgala - Yasavatī	Pulila	
4	Dīpaṃkara	Dīpaṃkara	Rammavatī	Sudeva - Sumedhā	Pipphala	Sumedha (also Sumati or Megha Mānava)
5	Koṇḍañña	Kauṇḍinya	Rammavatī	Sunanda - Sujātā	Salakalyana	Vijitawi (a Chakravarti in Chandawatinagara of Majjhimadesa)
6	Maṅgala	Maṃgala	Uttara (Majhimmadesa)	Uttara - Uttarā	Nāga (Mesua ferrea)	Suruchi (in Siribrahmano)
7	Sumana	Sumanas	Mekhala	Sudassana - Sirimā	Nāga (Mesua ferrea)	King Atulo, a Naga
8	Revata	Raivata	Sudhaññavatī	Vipula - Vipulā	Nāga (Mesua ferrea)	
9	Sobhita	Śobhita	Sudhamma	Sudhamma - Sudhammā	Nāga (Mesua ferrea)	Sujata (in Rammavati)
10	Anomadassi	Anavamadarśin	Candavatī	Yasava - Yasodharā	Ajjuna	A Yaksha king
11	Paduma	Padma	Campaka	Asama - Asamā	Salala	A lion
12	Nārada	Nārada	Dhaññavatī	Raja Sudeva - Anomā	Sonaka	A tapaso in the Himalayas
13	Padumuttara	Padmottara	Haṁsavatī	Ānanda - Sujātā	Salala	Jatilo, an ascetic
14	Sumedha	Sumedha	Sudassana	Sumedha - Sumedhā	Nipa	Native of Uttaro
15	Sujāta	Sujāta	Sumaṅgala	Uggata - Pabhāvatī	Welu	A chakravarti
16	Piyadassi	Priyadarśin	Sudhañña	Sudinna/Sudatta - Sucandā	Kakudha	Kassapa (at Siriwattanagara)
17	Atthadassi	Arthadarśin	Sobhana	Sāgara - Sudassanā	Champa	Susino,
18	Dhammadassī	Dharmadarśin	Saraṇa	Saraṇa - Sunandā	Bimbajala	Indra
19	Siddhattha	Siddhārtha	Vebhāra	Udena - Suphassā	Kanihani, kanikara (Pterospermum acerifolium) (Bayur tree)	Mangal
20	Tissa	Tiṣya	Khemaka	Janasandha - Padumā	Assana	King Sujata of Yasawatinagara
21	Phussa	Puṣya	Kāsika	Jayasena - Sirimā	Amalaka	Vijitavi
22	Vipassī	Vipaśyin	Bandhumatī	Bandhumā - Bandhumatī	Pāṭalī (Stereospermum chelonoides)	King Atula
23	Sikhī	Śikhin	Aruṇavatī	Aruṇa - Pabhāvatī	Puṇḍarīka (Mangifera indica)	Arindamo (at Paribhuttanagara)
24	Vessabhū	Viśvabhū	Anoma	Suppatīta - Yasavatī	Sāla (Shorea robusta)	Sadassana (in Sarabhavatinagara)
25	Kakusandha	Krakucchanda	Khemāvatī	Aggidatta - Visākhā	Sirīsa (Albizia lebbeck)	King Khema
26	Koṇāgamana	Kanakamuni	Sobhavatī	Yaññadatta - Uttarā	Udumbara (Ficus racemosa)	King Pabbata of a mountainous area in Mithila
27	Kassapa	Kāśyapa	Bārāṇasī	Brahmadatta - Dhanavatī	Nigrodha (Ficus benghalensis)	Jotipala (at Vappulla)
28	Gotama	Gautama (current)	Kapilavatthu	Suddhodana - Māyā	Assattha (Ficus religiosa)	Gautama, the Buddha
29	Metteyya	Maitreya (next)	Ketumatī (Bārāṇasi)	Subrahmā -Brahmavatī	Nāga (Mesua ferrea)	

== Mahāyāna Buddhas ==
The Great Buddha of Kamakura, a Japanese statue of Amida (Amitābha), 13th-century.

Mahāyāna Buddhists venerate numerous Buddhas that are not found in early Buddhism or in Theravada Buddhism. They are generally seen as living in other realms, known as buddha-fields (Sanskrit: buddhakṣetra) or pure lands (Ch: 淨土; p: Jìngtǔ) in East Asian Buddhism. They are sometimes called "celestial Buddhas" since they are not from this earth.

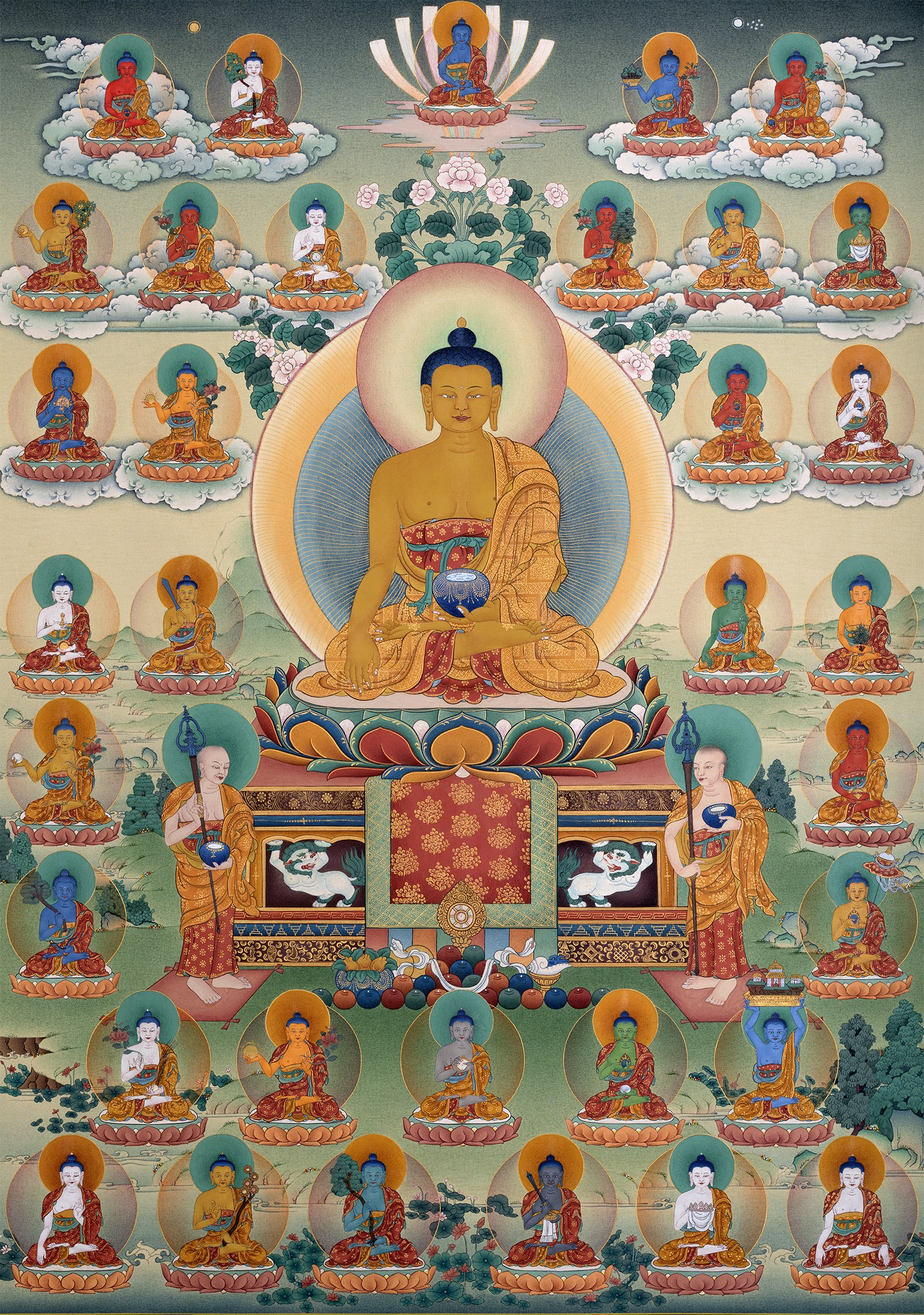
A Mahayana illustration of 35 Confession Buddhas

Some of the key Mahāyāna Buddhas are:

- Akshobhya ("the Imperturbable"), appears in various sūtras like the Vimalakirti Sūtra. His buddha-field is Abhirati (lit. "The Joyous").
- Amitābha (Chinese: Amituofo, Japanese: Amida Butsu, "Infinite Light"), the principal Buddha of Pure Land Buddhism. His buddha-field is called Sukhāvatī ("Blissful").
- Amoghasiddhi ("Infallible Success")
- Bhaiṣajyaguru ("Medicine guru") also known as "Medicine Buddha", the healing Buddha. His pure land is Vaiḍūryanirbhāsa ("Pure Beryl Light").
- Ratnasambhava ("Jewel Born")
- Mahāvairocana ("the Great Illuminator"), a key figure in the Avatamsaka Sūtra and the Vairocanābhisaṃbodhi Sūtra. He is the central Buddha in Huayan Buddhism, Chinese Esoteric Buddhism and Shingon. His pure land is known as the Padmagarbhalokadhātu (the lotus treasury world) and also as "Densely Arrayed Akaniṣṭha" (Ghanavyūhakaniṣṭha).
- Prabhūtaratna ("Many Treasures"), an ancient Buddha who appears in the Lotus Sūtra
- Samantabhadra, a Buddha who is mentioned in the Akṣayamatinirdeśa Sūtra, which states that the bodhisattva Akṣayamati is said to be from the Buddha field of Samantabhadra.
- Lokeśvararāja, a past Buddha who is mentioned in the Larger Sūtra of Immeasurable Life
- Budai (Japanese: Hotei), the fat laughing Buddha, usually seen in China and often mistaken as the Buddha in western culture. This figure is believed to be a representation of a medieval Chinese monk who is associated with Maitreya, the future Buddha.

Some Mahāyāna sūtras also contain long lists of Buddhas which are used in different ways. One popular list of Buddhas is the Thirty-Five Confession Buddhas which is found in the Sūtra of the Three Heaps (Sanskrit: Triskandhadharmasūtra). This sūtra is popular in Tibetan Buddhist rites of confession. Another similar list is the Eighty-Eight Buddhas found in several Chinese Buddhist repentance rites.

The Bhadrakalpikasūtra contains a list of one thousand and four Buddhas and discusses their deeds. Most of these are Buddhas of the future.

=== In Vajrayana ===
In Tantric Buddhism (Vajrayana, Esoteric Buddhism) which includes Indo-Tibetan Buddhism, Chinese Esoteric Buddhism, Shingon, Tendai and Nepalese Buddhism, one finds some of the same Mahayana Buddhas along with other strictly tantric Buddha figures that are unique to Vajrayana.

==== Five Tathāgatas ====
There are five primary Buddhas known as the "Five Tathagathas": Mahāvairocana, Aksobhya, Ratnasambhava, Amitābha, and Amoghasiddhi. Each is associated with a different consort, direction, aggregate (or, aspect of the personality), emotion, element, color, symbol, and mount.

The Five Tathagatas and some of their associated elements are:

Buddha (Skt)	Main bodhisattva	Buddha-field	Seed syllable	Color	Element	Family and Symbol	Poison (kleśa)
Mahāvairocana	Samantabhadra	central pure land Akanistha Ghanavyuha	Vam	White	Space	Buddha family, Wheel	delusion
Akshobhya	Vajrapani	eastern pure land Abhirati	Hum	Blue	Water	Vajra	envy, jealousy
Amitābha	Avalokiteśvara	western pure land Sukhavati	Hrih	Red	Fire	Lotus (Padma)	craving
Ratnasaṃbhava	Ratnapani	southern pure land Shrimat	Tram	Gold/Yellow	Earth	Jewel (Ratna)	pride, greed
Amoghasiddhi	Viśvapāni	northern pure land Prakuta	Ah	Green	Air	Double vajra	aggression, aversion

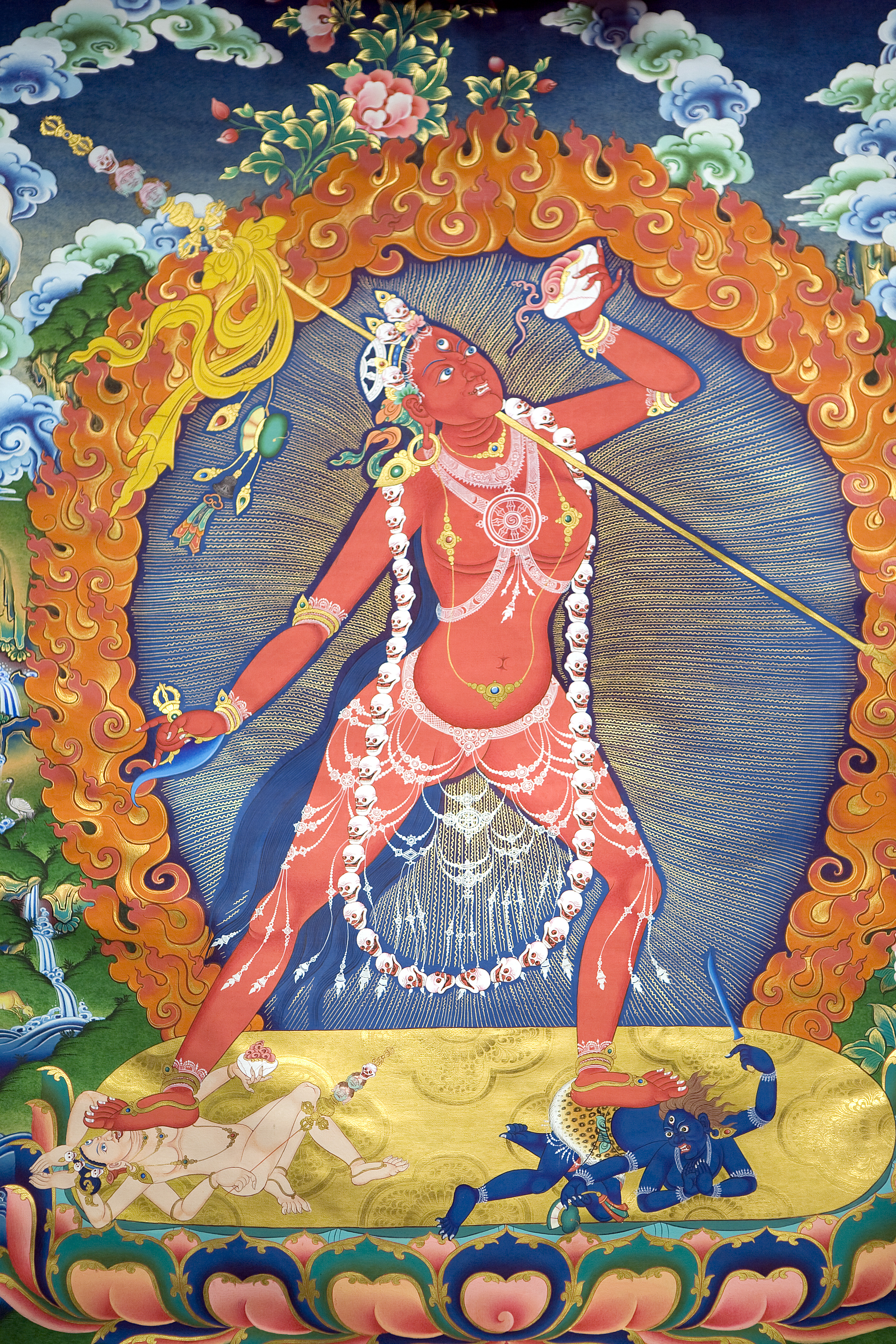
Painting of Vajrayoginī (Dorjé Neljorma), a female Buddha in Tibetan Buddhism.

==== Adibuddha ====
There is also the Vajrayana idea of the Adi-Buddha, the "first Buddha" to attain Buddhahood. Variously named as Vajradhara, Samantabhadra and Mahāvairocana, the first Buddha is also associated with the concept of Dharmakaya.

==== Female Buddhas ====
Buddhist Tantra also includes several female Buddhas, such as Tara, the most popular female Buddha in Tibetan Buddhism, who comes in many forms and colors. In several tantric sources, each of the main five Buddhas is paired with a vidyarajñi (wisdom queen) or prajña consort. They are:

- Ākāśadhātvīśvarī ("The Sovereign Lady of the Sphere of Infinite Space"), the prajñā of Vairocana
- Locanā, the prajñā of Akṣobhya
- Māmakī ("Mine-maker"), the prajñā of Ratnasambhava
- Paṇḍāravāsinī ("White Robed One"), the prajñā of Amitabha
- Tārā ('Star"), sometimes associated with Amoghasiddhi, sometimes Amitabha

There are also feminine counterparts to the Adi-Buddha figure, and both are often depicted in union (yab-yum). As such, in the Nyingma school for example, the Adi-buddha Samantabhadra is paired with a vidya called Samantabhadri, and in Sarma schools, Vajradhara is paired with a supreme female Buddha as well (Prajñaparamita, Vajradhatu Ishvari, or Vajrayogini).

==== Fierce Buddhas ====
In the Buddhist tantras, there are various fierce deities which are tantric forms of the Buddhas. These may be fierce (Tibetan: trowo, Sanskrit: krodha) Buddha forms or semi-fierce, and may appear in sexual union with a female Buddha or as a "solitary hero". The Heruka (Tb. khrag 'thung, lit. "blood drinker") are enlightened masculine beings who adopt fierce forms to help beings. They include Yamāntaka, Cakrasaṃvara, Hevajra, Mahākāla, and Vajrakīlaya. Dakini (Tb. khandroma, "sky-goer") are their feminine counterparts, sometimes depicted with a heruka and sometimes as independent deities. The most prevalent wrathful dakini are Vajrayogini, Vajravārāhī, Nairātmyā, and Kurukullā.

During the tantric period, Buddhist mythology overlapped with Hindu mythology. Akshobhya, for example, acquires a fierce Tantric form that is reminiscent of the fierce form of the Hindu god Mahākāla; in this form he became known by the Buddhist names Heruka, Hevajra, or Samvara. He is known in Japan in this guise as Fudō ("Imperturbable"). The Hindu god Bhairava, a fierce bull-headed divinity, was adopted by Tantric Buddhists as Vajrabhairava. Also called Yamāntaka ("Slayer of Death") and identified as the fierce expression of the gentle Mañjuśrī, he was accorded quasi-Buddha rank.

==== Others ====
Some historical figures are also seen as Buddhas, such as the Buddhist philosopher Nagarjuna, Tibetan historical figures like Padmasambhava, Tsongkhapa and Kōbō Daishi.

== Depictions of the Buddhas in art ==
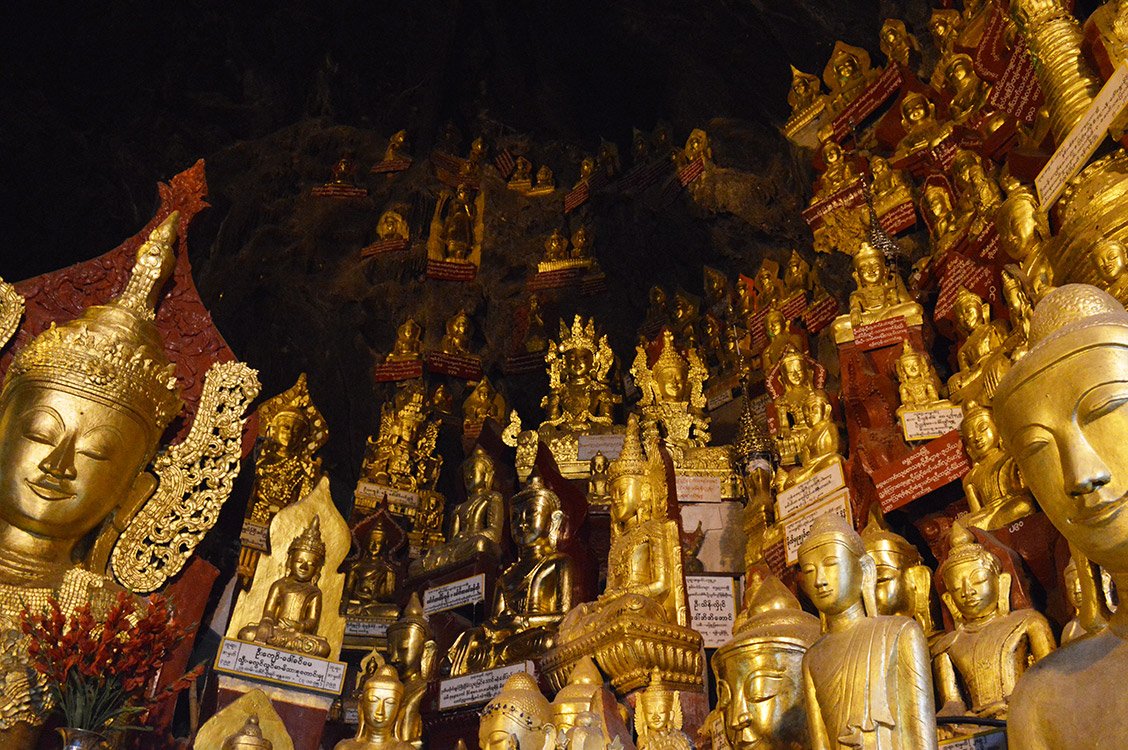
Various types of Buddha statues at Pindaya caves, Myanmar

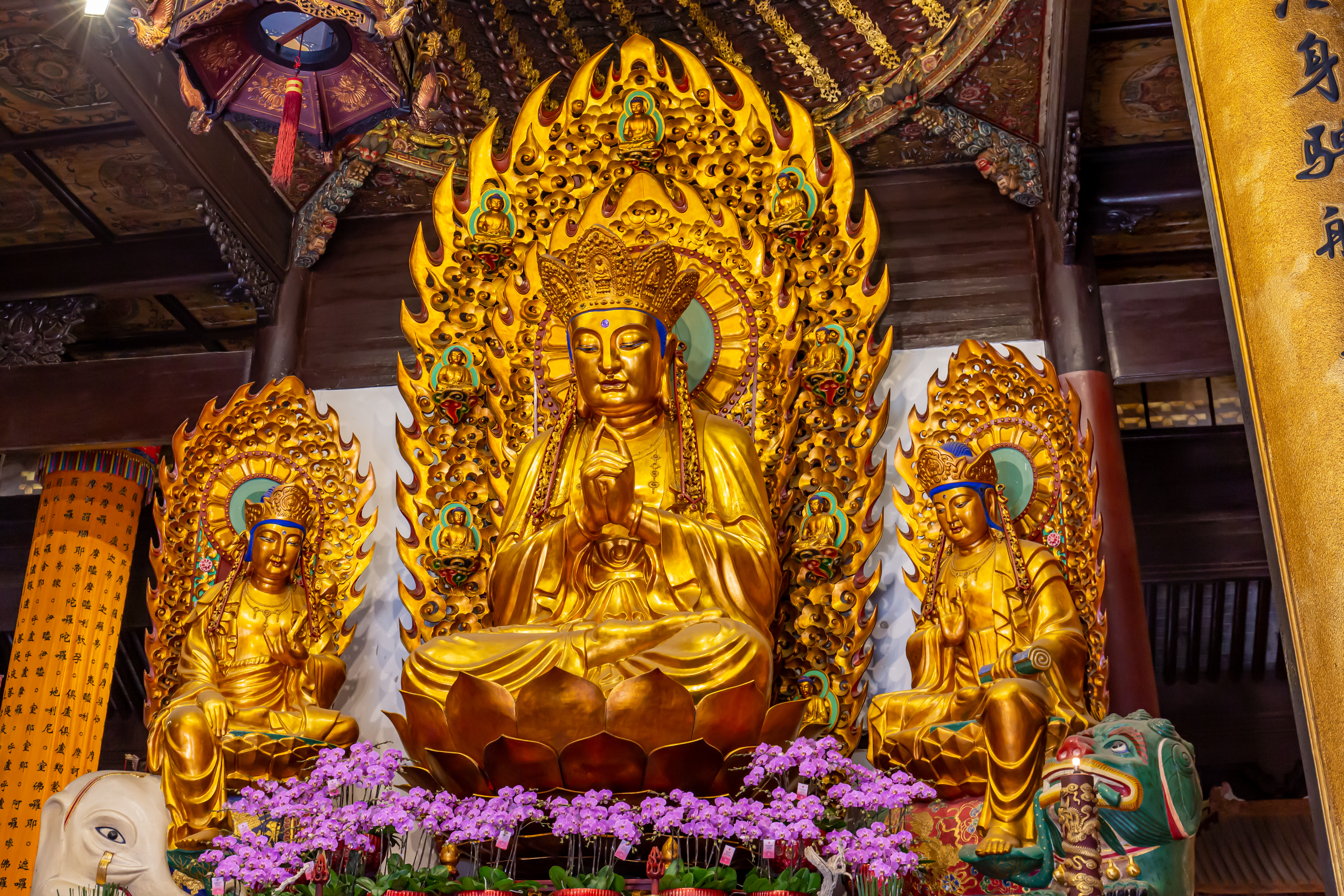
Buddha statues at Longhua Temple

Buddhas are frequently represented in the form of statues and paintings. Commonly seen postures include:

- The Seated Buddha in the Lotus position
- Buddha seated on a throne
- The Reclining Buddha (usually depicts his final nirvana)
- The Standing Buddha
- A walking Buddha with one step forward
- The emaciated Buddha, which shows Siddhartha Gautama during his extreme ascetic practice of starvation.
- The baby Buddha (usually pointing upwards).

In Theravada Buddhism, the Buddha is always depicted as a monastic shown with hair and he is always shown wearing the simple monk's robe (called a kāṣāya). In Mahayana Buddhism, a Buddha is often also depicted with monastic robes, however some Buddhas are also depicted with different forms of clothing, such as princely or kingly attire, which can include crowns and jewels.

It is common to depict the Buddha accompanied by other figures. In Theravada, it is common to have him flanked by his two main disciples, Moggallana and Sariputta. In Mahayana Buddhism, it is more common to have him surrounded by bodhisattvas, like Manjushri, Samantabhadra and Avalokiteshvara.

The Buddha may also be depicted with various accessories, such as a victory banner (dhvaja), a lotus seat, and a begging bowl.

=== Special characteristics of a Buddha's body ===
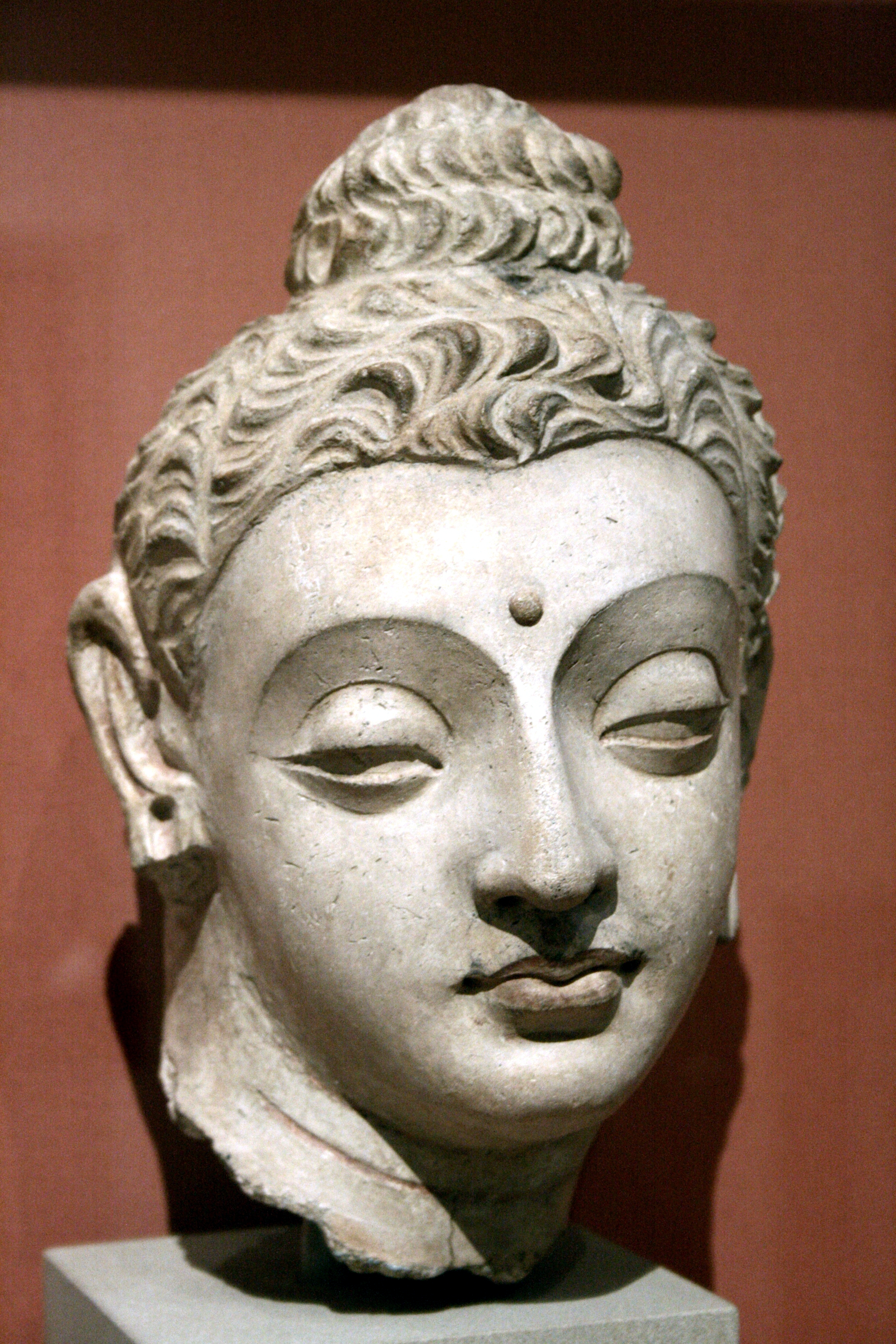
A Buddha's head, showing an uṣṇīṣa at the top of the head and an ūrṇā between the eyes

Most depictions of a Buddha contain a certain number of "marks" (lakṣaṇa), which are considered the signs of his nobility and his enlightenment. The exactly design and style of these features vary regionally but most often they are elements of list of thirty-two physical characteristics of the Buddha called "the signs of a great man" (Skt. mahāpuruṣa lakṣaṇa).

Some of the most obvious features which can be found in many buddha statues include:

- The uṣṇīṣa, a protuberance on the top of the head which symbolizes superb wisdom.
- The ūrṇā, or ūrṇākośa, a spiral tuft of hair or circular dot between the eyebrows.
- Dharma wheels on the soles of his feet and on his hands
- Other auspicious symbols on his body (such as lotuses, swastikas, endless knots, etc.)
- Long earlobes, symbolizing denoting superb perception
- Unnaturally long arms and long thin fingers
- Golden skin

=== Hand-gestures ===
The poses and hand-gestures of these statues, known respectively as asanas and mudras, are significant to their overall meaning. The popularity of any particular mudra or asana tends to be region-specific, such as the Vajra (or Chi Ken-in) mudra, which is popular in Japan and Korea but rarely seen in India. Others are more common; for example, the Varada (Wish-Granting) mudra is common among standing statues of the Buddha, particularly when coupled with the Abhaya (Fearlessness and Protection) mudra.

== See also ==
- Bodhisattva
- Eternal Buddha
- Glossary of Buddhism
- List of Buddha claimants
- List of bodhisattvas
- List of named Buddhas
- Secular Buddhism
- Ten Bodhisattas
- Thirty-five Confession Buddhas
