= Thirty-five Confession Buddhas =

Sequence of Buddhas in Tibetan Buddhism

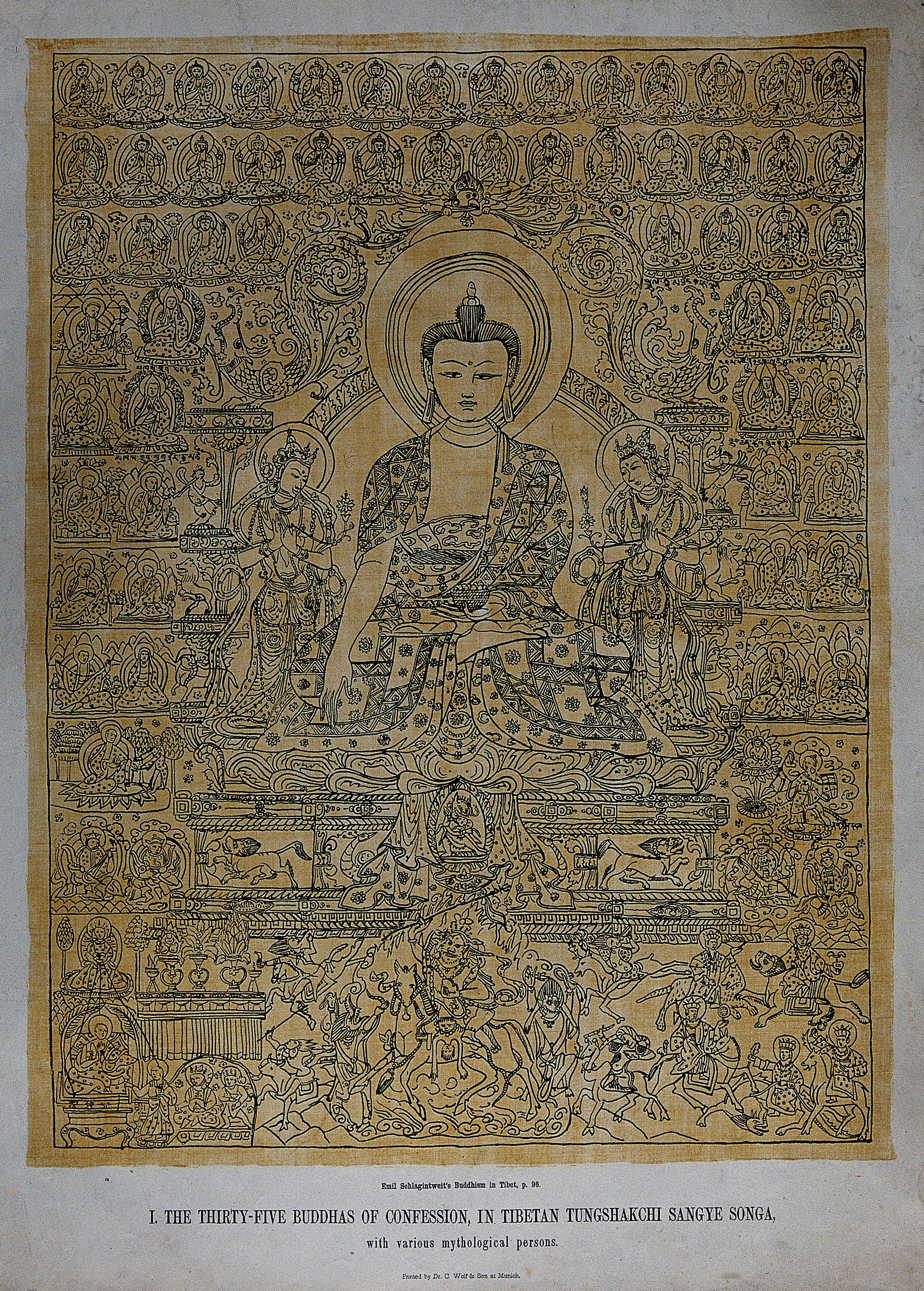
The 35 Buddhas of Confession

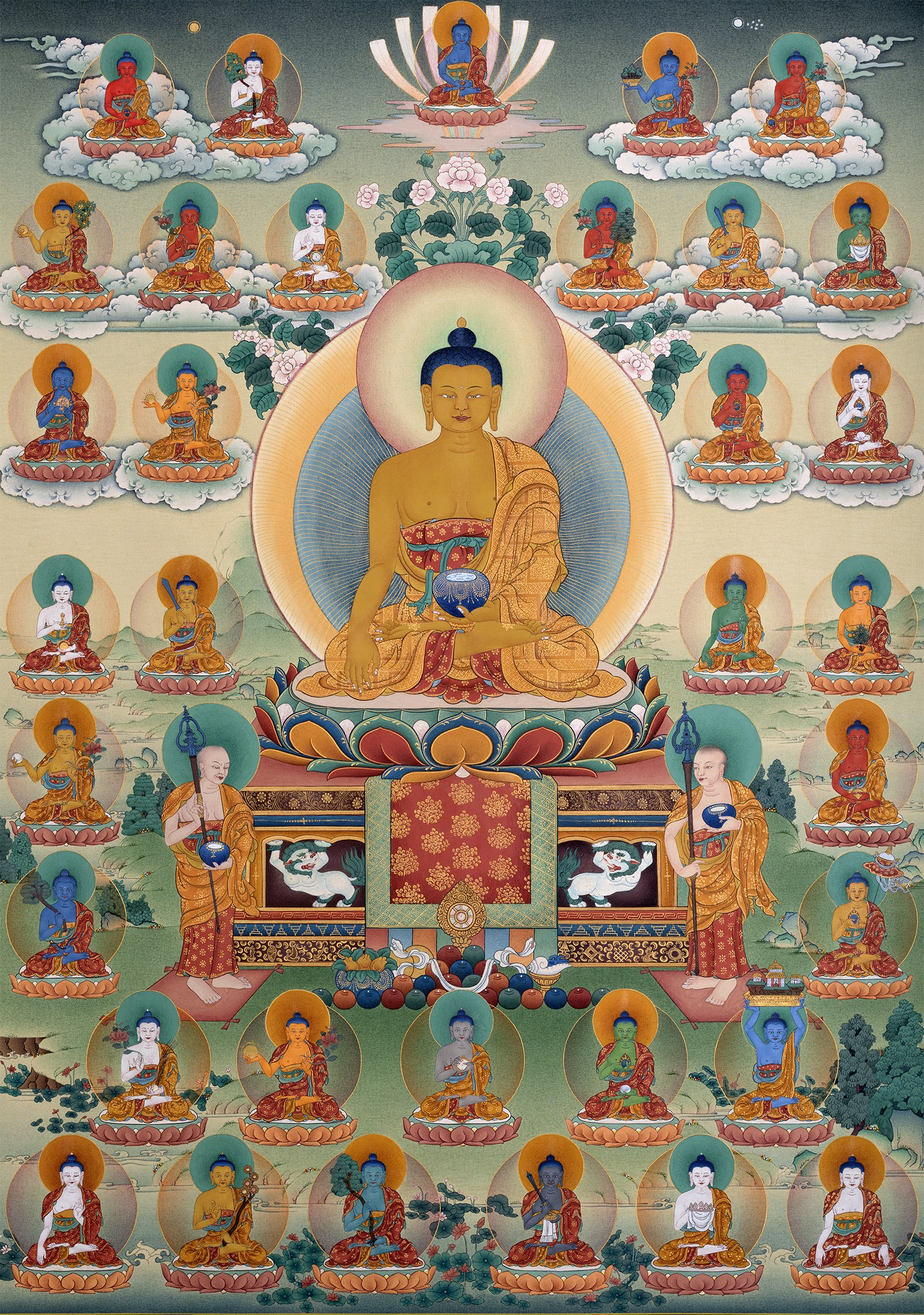
A Mahayana illustration of 35 Buddhas

The Thirty-Five Confession Buddhas (Wylie: gsheg lha so lnga) are known from the Sutra of the Three Heaps (Sanskrit: Triskandhadharmasutra; Tib. phung po gsum pa'i mdo), popular in Tibetan Buddhism. This Mahāyāna sutra actually describes the practice of purification by confession and making prostrations to these Buddhas, and is part of the larger Stack of Jewels Sutra (Sanskrit: Ratnakutasutra; Tibetan: dkon mchog brtsegs pa'i mdo).

In Tibet there were two distinct traditions of the Thirty-five Confession Buddhas which arose from the two main Indian schools of Mahāyāna Buddhism: one from the Madhyamaka school founded by Nāgārjuna, and the other from the Yogācāra school founded by Asaṅga and Vasubandhu. Both of these schools developed their own rituals for conferring the Bodhisattva vows, each incorporating a visualization of the Thirty-five Buddhas along with the recitation of the confession from the Triskhandhadharma Sutra.

== List of Names ==
The names of the 35 Buddhas of confession differ depending on the sutra. A common classification in Tibetan Buddhism is as follows:

| Sanskrit | Tibetan | Tibetan pronunciation | English |
|---|---|---|---|
| Śākyamuni | ཤཱཀྱ་ཐུབ་པ་ | shakya tup-pa | Shakyamuni |
| Vajrapramardī | རྡོ་རྗེ་སྙིང་པོས་རབ་ཏུ་འཇོམས་པ | dorjé nyingpö raptu jompa | Complete Foe Destroyer by Vajra Essence means |
| Ratnārśiṣ | རིན་ཆེན་འོད་འཕྲོ | rinchen ö-tro | Precious Radiant Light |
| Nāgeśvararāja | ཀླུ་དབང་གི་རྒྱལ་པོ | luwang gi gyelpo | King, Lord of the Nagas |
| Vīrasena | དཔའ་བོའི་སྡེ | pawö-dé | Army of Heroes |
| Vīranandī | དཔའ་བོ་དགྱེས | pawö-gyé | Delighted Hero |
| Ratnāgni | རིན་ཆེན་མེ | rinchen-mé | Jewel Fire |
| Ratnacandraprabha | རིན་ཆེན་ཟླ་འོད | rinchen da-ö | Jewel Moonlight |
| Amoghadarśi | མཐོང་བ་དོན་ཡོད | tongwa dönyö | Meaningful Vision |
| Ratnacandra | རིན་ཆེན་ཟླ་བ | rinchen dawa | Jewel Moon |
| Vimala | དྲི་མ་མེད་པ | drima mépa | Stainless One |
| Śūradatta | དཔའ་སྦྱིན | pa-jin | Heroic Giving |
| Brahma | ཚངས་པ | tsangpa | Pure One |
| Brahmadatta | ཚངས་པས་སྦྱིན་ | tsangpé jin | Giving of Purity |
| Varuṇa | ཆུ་ལྷ | chu lha | Water God |
| Varuṇadeva | ཆུ་ལྷའི་ལྷ | chu lhaé lha | God of the Water Gods |
| Bhadraśrī | དཔལ་བཟང | pel-zang | Glorious Goodness |
| Candanaśrī | ཙན་དན་དཔལ | tsenden pel | Glorious Sandalwood |
| Anantatejas | གཟི་བརྗིད་མཐའ་ཡས | ziji tayé | Infinite Splendour |
| Prabhāśrī | འོད་དཔལ | ö pel | Glorious Light |
| Aśokaśrī | མྱ་ངན་མེད་པའི་དཔལ་ | nyangen mépé pel | Sorrowless Glory |
| Nārāyaṇa | སྲེད་མེད་ཀྱི་བུ | sémé-kyi bu | Non attached to sons |
| Kusumaśrī | མེ་ཏོག་དཔལ | métok pel | Glorious Flower |
| Tathāgata Brahmajyotivikrīḍitābhijña | དེ་བཞིན་གཤེགས་པ་ཚངས་པའི་འོད་ཟེར་རྣམ་པར་རོལ་པ་མངོན་པར་མཁྱེན་པ | dézhin shekpa tsangpé özer nampar rölpa ngönpar khyenpa | Tathagata of Pure Light Rays Manifesting Complete Omniscience |
| Tathāgata Padmajyotirvikrīditābhijña | དེ་བཞིན་གཤེགས་པ་པདྨའི་འོད་ཟེར་རྣམ་པར་རོལ་པས་མངོན་པར་མཁྱེན་པ | dézhin shekpa pémé özer nampar rölpé ngönpar khyenpa | Tathagata of Lotus Light Rays Manifesting Complete Omniscience |
| Dhanaśrī | ནོར་དཔལ | norpel | Glorious Wealth |
| Smṛtiśrī | དྲན་པའི་དཔལ | drenpé pel | Glorious Mindfulness |
| Suparikīrtitanāmagheyaśrī | མཚན་དཔལ་ཤིན་ཏུ་ཡོངས་སུ་གྲགས་པ | tsenpel shintu yongsu drakpa | Excessively Well Renowned Glorious Name |
| Indraketudhvajarāja | དབང་པོའི་ཏོག་གི་རྒྱལ་མཚན་གྱི་རྒྱལ་པོ | wangpö tok-gi gyeltsen-gyi gyelpo | King of the Victory Banner that Crowns the Sovereign |
| Suvikrāntaśrī | ཤིན་ཏུ་རྣམ་པར་གནོན་པའི་དཔལ | shintu nampar nönpé pel | Glorious One Who Fully Subdues |
| Yuddhajaya | གཡུལ་ལས་རྣམ་པར་རྒྱལ་བ | yül lé nampar gyelwa | Utterly Victorious in Battle |
| Vikrāntagāmī | རྣམ་པར་གནོན་པའི་གཤེགས་པའི་དཔལ | nampar nönpé shekpé pel | Glorious Transcendence Through Subduing |
| Samantāvabhāsavyūhaśrī | ཀུན་ནས་སྣང་བ་བཀོད་པའི་དཔལ | kün-né nangwa köpé pel | Glorious Manifestations Illuminating All |
| Ratnapadmavikramī | རིན་ཆེན་པདྨའི་རྣམ་པར་གནོན་པ | Rinchen padmé nampar nönpa | Jewel Lotus who Subdues All |
| Ratnapadmasupraṭiṣṭhita-śailendrarāja | དེ་བཞིན་གཤེགས་པ་དགྲ་བཅོམ་པ་ཡང་དག་པར་རྫོགས་པའི་སངས་རྒྱས་རིན་པོ་ཆེ་དང་པདྨ་ལ་རབ་ཏུ་བཞུགས་པའི་རི་དབང་གི་རྒྱལ་པོ | Dézhin shekpa drachompa yangdakpar dzokpé sanggyé rinpoché dang padama la raptu zhukpé riwang gi gyelpo | Tathagata All-subduing Jewel Lotus, Arhat, Perfectly Completed Buddha, King of the Lord of the Mountains Firmly Seated on Jewel and Lotus |

== Iconography ==
The Thirty-Five Confession Buddhas are a common subject depicted in Himalayan Buddhist paintings and sculpture. There are at least three iconographic systems for depicting the Thirty-Five Buddhas, based on the different descriptions found in ritual texts and commentaries by different authors including Nagarjuna, (Note: Probably not the Nagarjuna who founded the Madhyamaka school but a later teacher with the same name) Sakya Paṇḍita, Jonang Tāranātha and Je Tsongkhapa.

The three main iconographic traditions are:

1. The system attributed to Nagarjuna where the 35 Buddhas are depicted with different objects in their hands,
2. The system of Sakya Paṇḍita where the 35 Buddhas are depicted with hand gestures only (no hand objects), and
3. The system based on Je Tsongkhapa's personal vision of the 35 Buddhas, where only some of the Buddhas have objects in their hands.

== See also ==
- Twenty-Eight Buddhas
- List of bodhisattvas
