= Eighty-eight Buddhas Great Repentance Text =

The Eighty-eight Buddhas Great Repentance Text (Chinese: 禮佛大懺悔文) is a Buddhist text widely used in the repentance practice or ritual of Buddhism, especially in the East Asian Mahayana tradition, where it is recited daily in monasteries, temples, and households.

The repentance practice features the recitation of the names of eighty-eight buddhas in the text, which are sourced from two Buddhist scriptures: the Bhaiṣajyarājabhaiṣajyasamudagatabodhisattvasūtra (Chinese:佛說觀藥王藥上二菩薩經; The Buddha Speaks of the Sutra of Visualization of the Two Bodhisattvas, the King of Medicine and the Superior Physician) and the Upāliparipṛcchā (Chinese:決定毘尼經; The Buddha Speaks of Decisive Vinaya Sutra). The main body of these two scriptures are not included in some versions of the Eighty-eight Buddhas Great Repentance Text.

It is believed that recitation of the text can help one to clear karmic obstacles and draw out inner wisdom.

== Background ==
The first fifty-three Buddhas, from Universal Light Buddha (普光佛) to King Forever Replete In All Dharmas Buddha (一切常滿王佛), are from Bhaiṣajyarājabhaiṣajyasamudagatabodhisattvasūtra. According to the sutra, "If a good man, good woman, or all the other sentient beings get to hear the names of these fifty-three Buddhas, they will not fall into the evil destinies for hundreds, thousands, ten thousands millions of asamkhya kalpas. Any person chants the names of these fifty-three Buddhas will be able to see the Buddhas of the ten directions in every life afterwards. If any person makes prostration to the fifty-three Buddhas piously, offences such as the Four Great Prohibitions, the Five Great Misdeeds, and the defamation of Buddhist scriptures they committed will be eradicated and they can be cleansed. Thanks to the vows of these Buddhas, various serious offences mentioned above will all be completely wiped out in every thought."

The other thirty-five Buddhas, from Shakyamuni to King Precious Lotus Skillfully Dwelling Beneath the Sala Tree Buddha (寶蓮華善住娑羅樹王佛), are from Upāliparipṛcchā. According to the sutra, "If any Bodhisattva commits Five Avici Offenses, breaks the rules for expulsion from the Sangha (pārājika), commits the offence of monastic, commits offense against any pagoda or any monk, or commits other similar offences, such Bodhisattva should repent alone before the thirty-five Buddhas the serious offenses whole-heartedly day and night... If the Bodhisattva can recite the name of all the thirty-five Buddhas and always practice the Three Practices day and night, they can be free from offences, worries and regrets and get Samadhi."
