= Bhutandevi Mandir =

Hindu temple in Nepal

Bhutandevi Temple
- भूटनदेवी मन्दिर
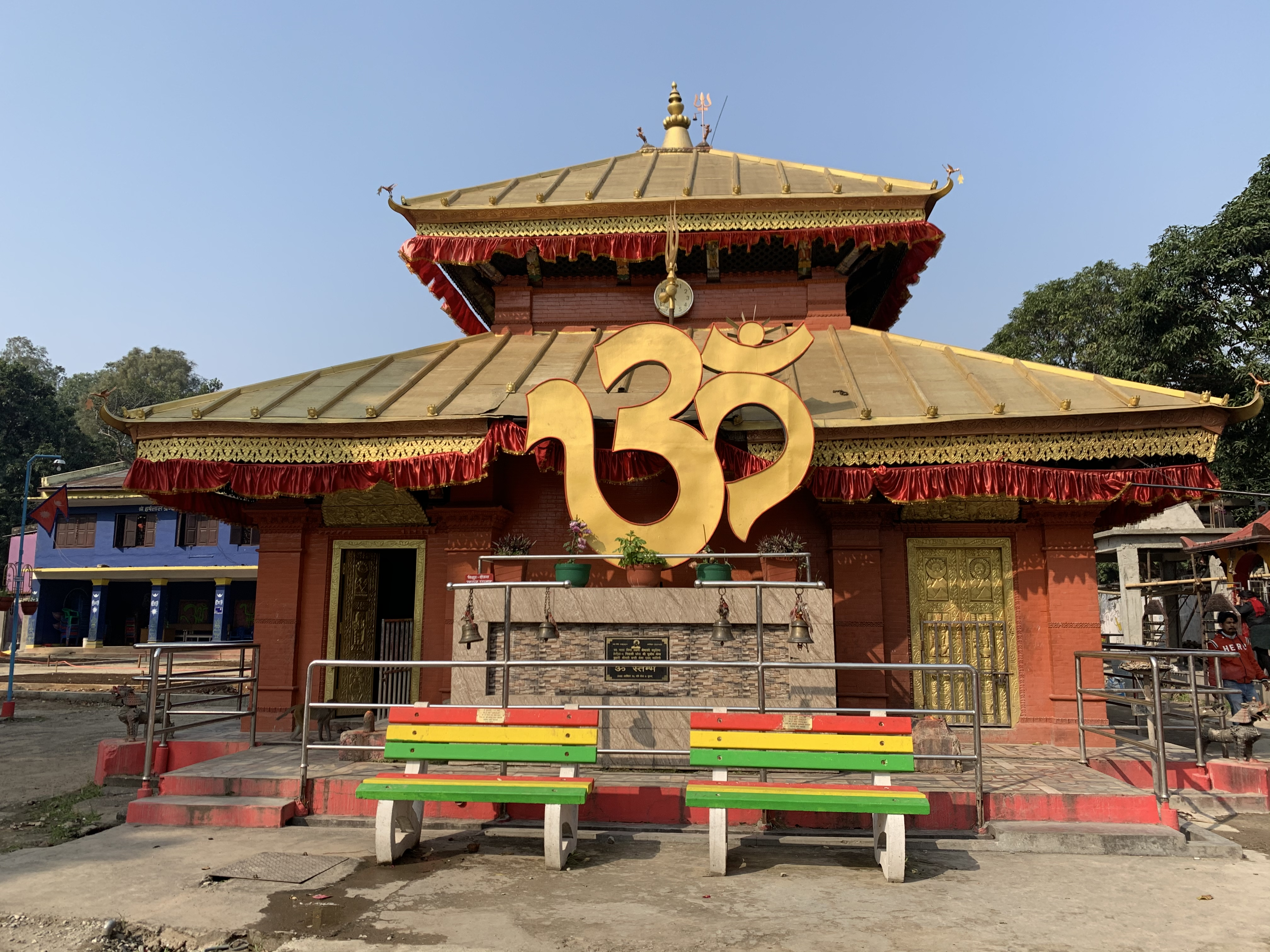
- Main temple

- Location within Nepal

Religion
- Affiliation: Hinduism
- District: Makwanpur District
- Province: Bagmati
- Deity: Hidimba
- Festival: Dashain

Location
- Location: Hetauda
- Country: Nepal
- Interactive map of Bhutandevi Temple
- Coordinates: 27.4241°N 85.0232°E

Architecture
- Type: Pagoda

Bhutandevi Mandir (Nepali: भूटनदेवी मन्दिर) is a Hindu temple dedicated to goddess Bhutandevi (Hidimbi), located in Hetauda city of Bagmati Province, Nepal. Hidimba is one of the wives of Bhima (one of the Pandavas) and the mother of Ghatotkacha, a hero of Kurukshetra War. Bhutandevi is also considered to be another form of goddess Durga. The city of Hetauda itself is believed to be named after the goddess Hidimba.

== Gallery ==
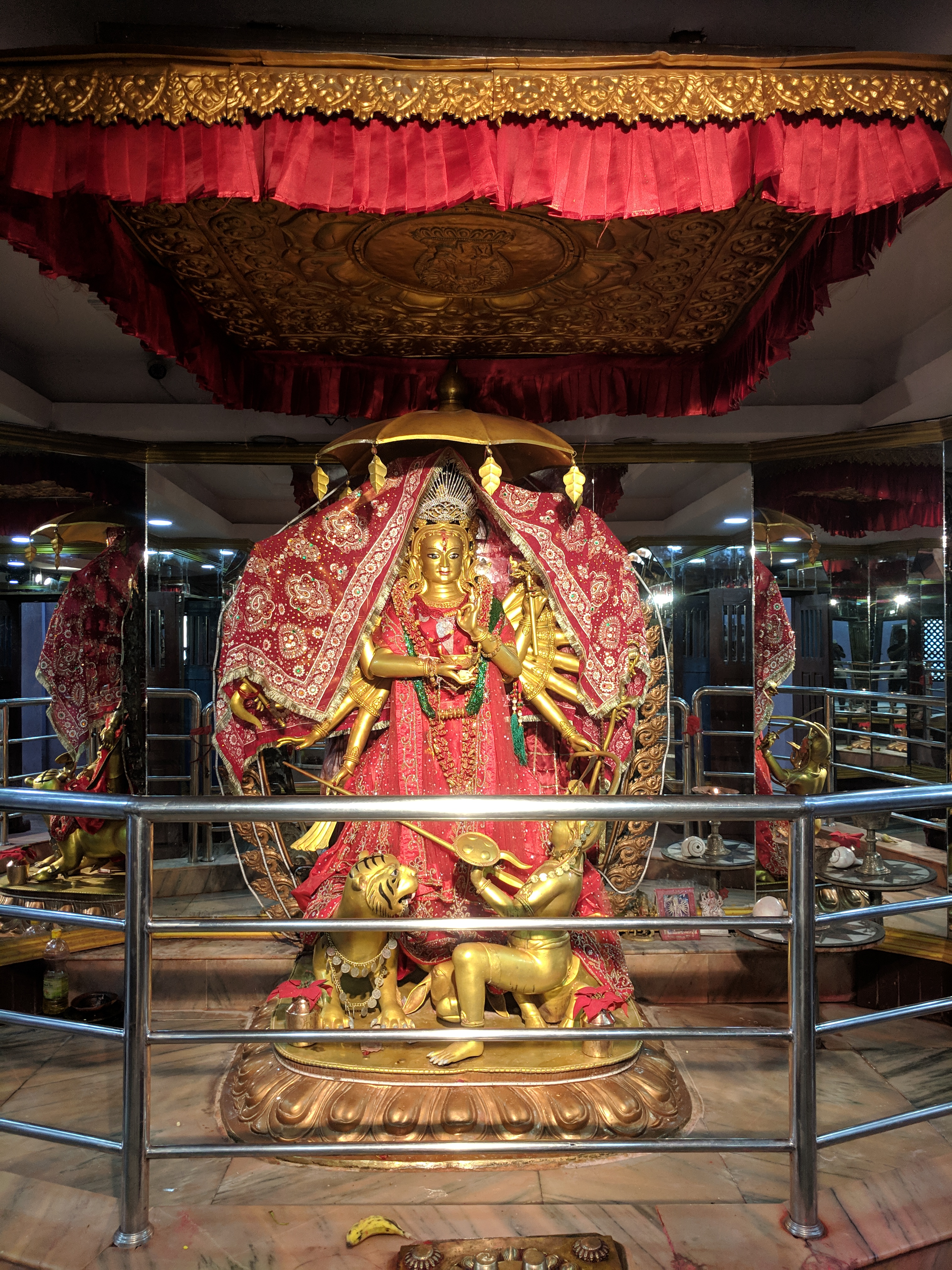
Idol of the goddess in the temple

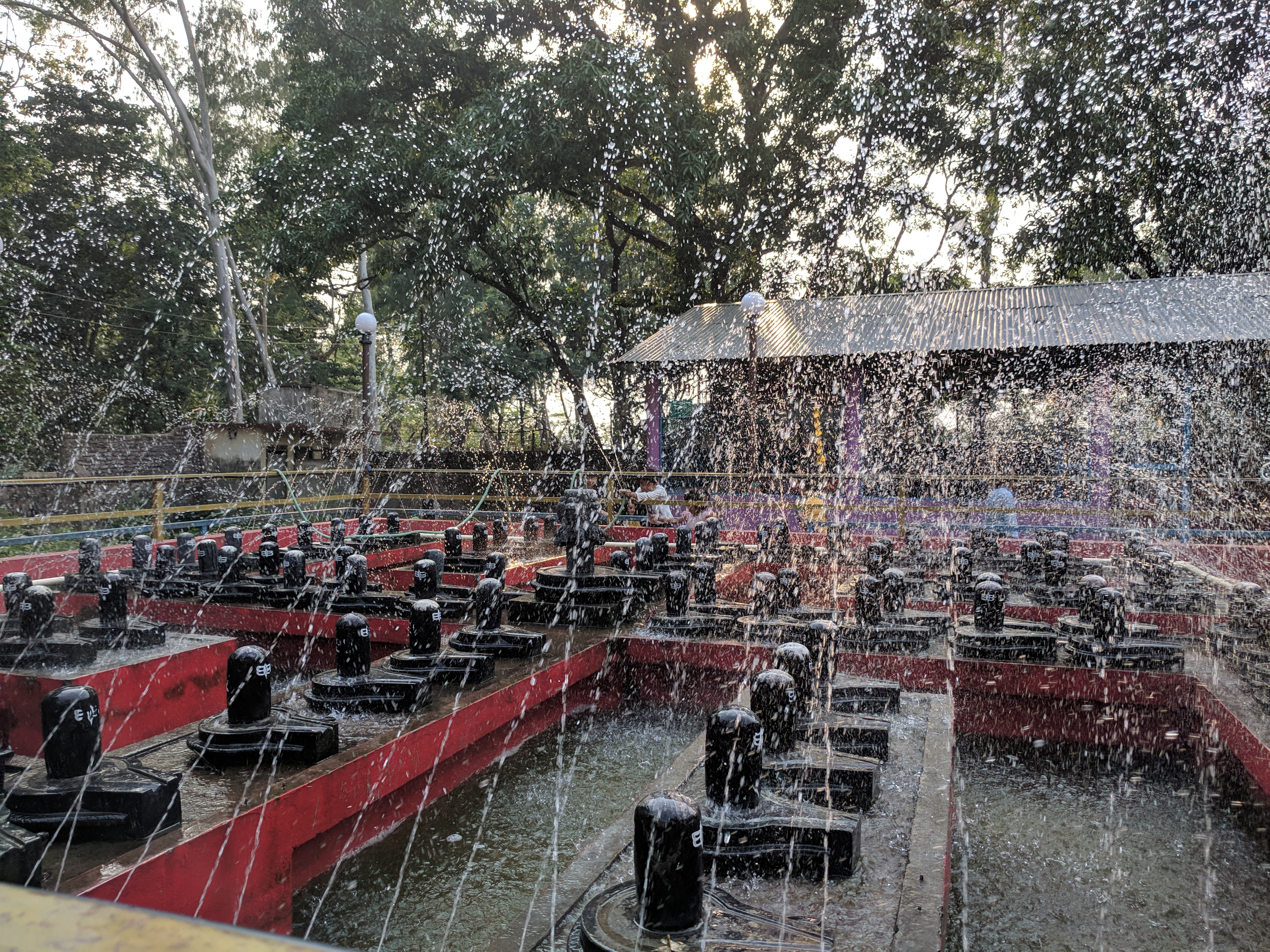
Shiva linga in the temple premises

== See also ==
- Gadhimai
- Kushmanda Sarowar Triveni Dham
