= Ujaan Ganguly =

Indian film actor

- Education: St. James' School; Jadavpur University Department of English; University of Oxford
- Occupation: Actor Writer Director
- Notable work: Rosogolla (actor) Lokkhi Chhele (Actor) Kurukshetra (Writer-Director)
- Height: 1.81 m (5 ft 11 in)
- Parents: Kaushik Ganguly (father); Churni Ganguly (mother)

Ujaan Ganguly is an Indian film and theatre actor, live-action and animation director and writer, music producer, composer, lyricist and musical artist . He is the writer-director of the animated show Kurukshetra on Netflix, which held the No. 1 spot on "Top 10 Shows in India" in Netflix. Ujaan made his debut as an actor in Rosogolla (2018) directed by Pavel and was named as one of the top 10 actors of 2019. He was also adjudged the Best Debut Actor at the Tele Cine Awards and the North American Bengali Conference Film Festival, at Baltimore, 2019.

== Personal life ==
Ujaan is the son of film director Kaushik Ganguly and actress Churni Ganguly.

== Education ==
At St. James' School he was invested as the School Captain. In his 12th Standard, Ujaan represented India at the Modern World Debate hosted at Dubai Modern High School. For his academic performance of 96.25% in Arts he was awarded the Bishop of Calcutta Gold Medal for Academic Excellence in ISC. He also received the honour of Times of India Student of the Year and the prestigious Kalyan Bharti Trust Award for All-Round Excellence at The Telegraph School Awards 2016.

Ujaan is also a Gold Medalist student. He is the recipient of a first class A+ grade Bachelor's degree from Jadavpur University with distinction in English and was awarded the Gold Medal and the Best All-Rounder Graduate and Student of the Year of Jadavpur University in 2019. In 2021, Ujaan went to University of Oxford in World Literatures with the prestigious Ertegun Graduate Scholarship as a member of St Hugh's College. He graduated with a first class Distinction on 23 September 2023, after researching on censorship.

== Career ==
Ujaan Ganguly acted in a musical Smike in 2013 and played the role of a 50-year old school head-master. He made his debut in the big screen in Rosogolla (2018) directed by Pavel. In the film he played the role of Nobin Chandra Das, the creator of Rosogolla. In 2019, he acted in Lokkhi Chele directed by UNESCO Fellini awardee filmmaker Kaushik Ganguly. The film was produced by Nandita Roy and Shiboprosad Mukherjee. After Rosogolla Ganguly played the lead role in this film as well. His character in this film was of Amir Hussain, a young doctor in Purulia district, India. The film release was delayed due to the COVID-19 pandemic.

After his return from Oxford in 2023, Ujaan began his journey as a professional actor-writer. He wrote his first film screenplay and worked as the creative director for Ashukh Bishukh (unreleased), directed by Kaushik Ganguly. Parallelly, Ujaan started writing and directing the Netflix animated series Kurukshetra, based on the Mahabharata which premiered 10 October 2025 on Netflix. Kurukshetra released in two parts, smashing OTT records and garnering praise from audience and critics alike. Times Now wrote that "Ujaan Ganguly delivers an epic saga where mythology meets modern magic." Scroll.in and LiveMint referred to Ujaan's show as a "modern masterpiece", specifically mentioning the unique narrative style, attention to visual metaphors and Ujaan's "Gen Z" directorial vision.

Ujaan is currently making his first live-action feature film, set to release in 2026.

== Filmography ==
Denotes films that have not yet been released

Year	Film	Role	Ref
2018	Rosogolla	Nobin Chandra Das	
2022	Lokkhi Chele	Amir Hussain	
2025	Kurukshetra	Writer-Director	
2026	Katukutu Buro	Actor - Director	

== Awards and Recognition ==
Denotes films that have not yet been released

Year	Project	Nomination	Award	Ref
2018	Rosogolla	Best Debut Actor	Filmfare East	N/A
2018	Rosogolla	Most Promising Actor	WBFJA	No
2018	Rosogolla	Best Debut Actor	Tele Cine Awards	Yes
2018	Rosogolla	Best Debut Actor	NABC Baltimore	Yes
2022	Lokkhi Chele	Upcoming Male Vocalist of the Year	Mirchi Music Awards	Yes
