= Kurukshetra: The Great War of Mahabharata =

Indian animated mythological television series on Netflix

- Also known as: Kurukshetra
- Genre: Historical fiction Animation; Drama
- Created by: Anu Sikka
- Written by: Ujaan Ganguly
- Directed by: Ujaan Ganguly
- Narrated by: Gulzar (voiceover)
- Country of origin: India
- Original language: Hindi

Production
- Producer: Alok Jain
- Animator: HiTech Animation

Original release
- Network: Netflix
- Release: 10 October 2025 – present

Kurukshetra: The Great War of Mahabharata is an Indian Hindi-language animated mythological television series that retells events from the Mahabharata through a character-focused format. The series is conceptualised and created by Anu Sikka and written and directed by Ujaan Ganguly. It is produced by Tipping Point, with animation by HiTech Animation, and includes lyrics and voiceover by poet-lyricist Gulzar.

The series was released in two parts, with Part 1 premiering on 10 October 2025 and Part 2 on 24 October 2025.

== Premise ==
Kurukshetra depicts the 18-day war at Kurukshetra between the Pandavas and the Kauravas using an episodic perspective structure, with individual chapters centred on specific figures and their choices during the conflict.

== Voice cast ==
Netflix lists the following voice cast members for the series:

- Vinod Sharma - Sanjaya
- Sahil Vaid - Krishna
- Saumya Daan - Arjuna & Sage-Man
- Annamaya Verma - Yudhishthira
- Manoj Pandey - Bheema & Sutasoma
- Ankit Goswami - Nakula
- Feroze Khan - Sahadeva & Yuyutsu
  - Neeil Rajurikar - Young Sahadeva
- Himanshu Rana - Abhimanyu
- Neha Gargava - Kunti
  - Payal Vishal - Young Kunti
- Payal Vishal - Hidimba
- Neshma Chemburkar - Draupadi
- Sushmita Daan - Subhadra
- Jigna Bharadhwaj - Uttara
- Saurav Haldar - Dhristadyumna
- Pawan Kalra - Duryodhana
- Krutarth Trivedi - Karna
- Anil Dutt - Dronacharya
- Vinod Kulkarni - Shakuni
- Nand Kishore Pandey - Bhishma
- Ajay Singhal - Dhritarashtra
- Sabina Malik - Gandhari
- Sanchit Wartak - Dushasana , Shikhandi & Indra
- Pushkar Vijay - Ashwatthama
- Ghansham Shukla - Kripacharya , Jayadratha , Hidimb & Alambusha
- Sanket Mhatre - Balarama
- Rajesh Jolly - Veda Vyasa
- Ganesh Divekar - Shalya
- Chand Krishen Dhar - Vidura
- Kaushik Sidhanντα - Purohit
- Krunal Alve - Yaksha
- Sushmita Benal - Amba
- Aditya Raj Sharma - Alayudha (Brother of Bakasura) & Susharma (King of Trigarta Kingdom)
- Shailendra Patel - Ghatotkach
- Sanjeev Tiwari - Virata (King of Matsya Kingdom , Drupada (King of Panchala) & Sage Durvasa
- Abhijeet Chitre - Satyaki , Lakshmana Kumara & Vriddhakshatra (Father of Jayadratha)
- Gaurav Haldar - Anjanaparva (Son of Ghatotkach) , Chitrasena , Kotikasya (a king of Shivi tribe and ally/follower of Jayadratha)
- Dhirendramani Ramprasad Dwivedi - Ganesha
- Sumeet Kaul - Announcer
- Pankaj Kalra - Parashurama
- Anshul Saxena - Kritavarma, Bhurishravas
- Shanu Dev Sharma - Shiva
- Harish Moiley - Prativindhya
- Harshvardhan Sharma - Shatanika

== Episodes ==
The series was released as a two-part season of 18 episodes. Part 1 focuses on nine chapters (each aligned to a key character), setting up the larger 18-perspective structure described by the creators and reviewers.

== Production ==
The series was created by Anu Sikka and produced under the Tipping Point banner, with Ujaan Ganguly serving as writer and director. The animation was produced by HiTech Animation, with Gulzar contributing lyrics and voiceover elements used in promotional material and the series’ framing.

A review in Scroll.in described the series as an epic spectacle and noted Kaushik Ganguly as series director alongside the credited creative team. In an interview published by afaqs!, HiTech Animation Studios' CEO Ashish Thapar said the production aimed to work for both audiences familiar with the Mahabharata and viewers without prior context, and discussed pacing and binge-viewing considerations for the episodic format.

== Release ==
Netflix released Part 1 on 10 October 2025, with Part 2 following on 24 October 2025.

== Reception ==
India Today rated Part 1 3/5 and highlighted the series' approach of telling the war through distinct perspectives, while noting uneven voice performances in places. Moneycontrol rated the series 3.5/5, calling it a condensed adaptation that foregrounds the war, and said the animation quality was uneven while the series remained accessible as an entry point to the epic. The Times of India gave Season 1 a critic rating of 3.5/5 and described the show as visually ambitious and morally layered, while pointing to moments where emotional impact and dubbing did not fully match the scale of the storytelling.

In a review of Part 1, Scroll.in wrote that the adaptation simplifies a complex source text and relies heavily on spectacle, and criticised its shifting timelines and compressed flashbacks while noting that ethical dilemmas still emerge despite the streamlined storytelling. Koimoi described Part 1 as an ambitious retelling and praised elements of its presentation while also identifying issues it felt limited the execution. Firstpost was positive about Part 1's visual presentation and framing of the epic war for an OTT audience.

Mint published reviews of both parts; its Part 1 review emphasised the series' focus on the war and its use of narration, and its Part 2 review treated the concluding episodes as a darker continuation that centres on moral ambiguity and consequence.

== See also ==
- Mahabharata
- Kurukshetra War
