= Nadutariappar Temple, Kanrappur =

Shiva temple in Tamil Nadu, India

Nadutariappar Temple
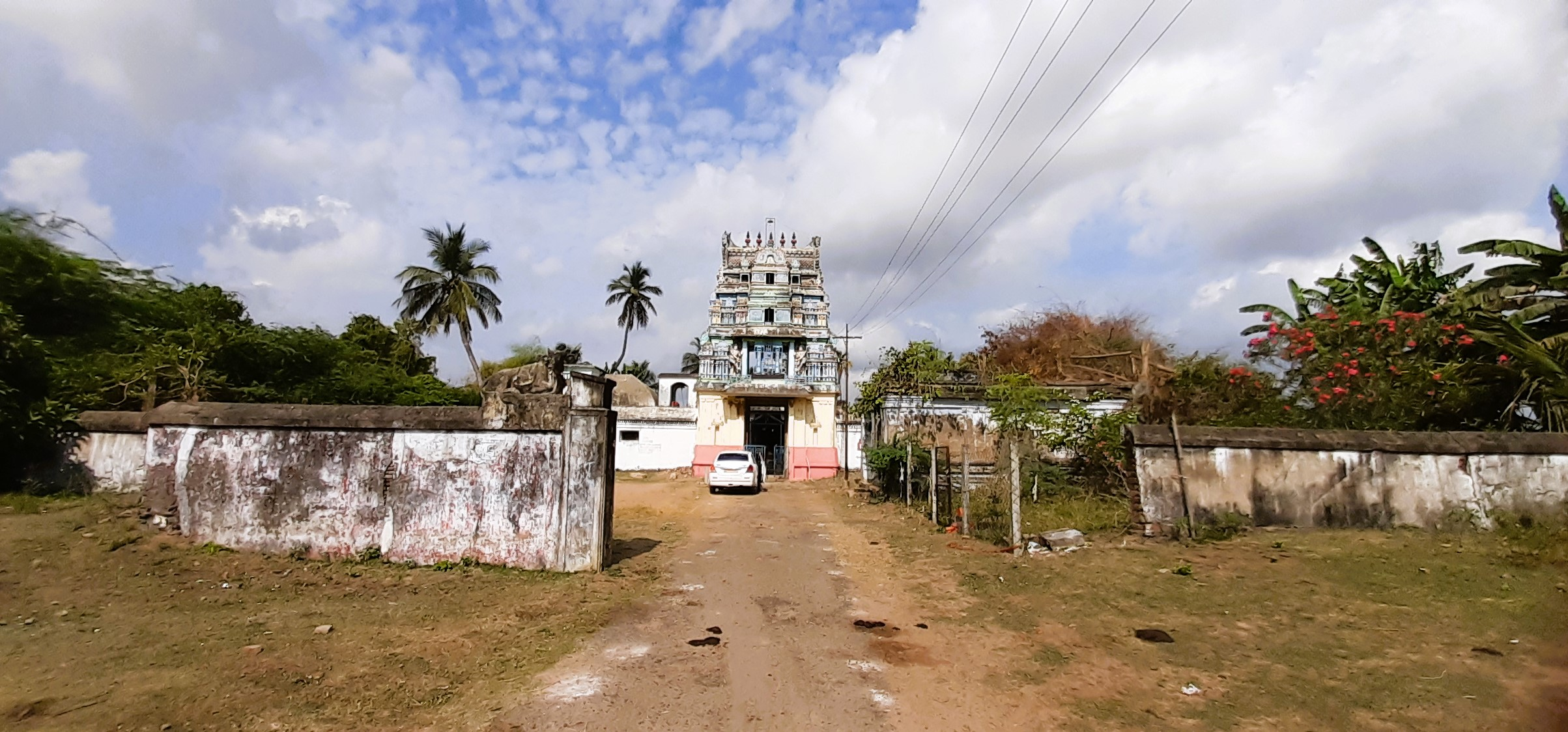

- Location in Tamil Nadu

Religion
- Affiliation: Hinduism
- District: Tiruvarur
- Deity: Nadutariappar

Location
- Location: Kanrappur
- State: Tamil Nadu
- Country: India
- Coordinates: 10.6792°N 79.6898°E

Architecture
- Type: Dravidian architecture

Specifications
- Temple: One
- Elevation: 37.72 m (124 ft)

Nadutariappar Temple, Kanrappur is a Hindu temple dedicated to Shiva located at Kanrappur near Tiruvarur, Tamil Nadu, India. The temple is incarnated by the hymns of Appar and is classified as Paadal Petra Sthalam.

Shiva is worshiped as Nadutariappar, and is represented by the lingam and his consort Parvati is depicted as Srivalli Nayagi. The presiding deity is revered in the 7th century Tamil Saiva canonical work, the Tevaram, written by Tamil poet saints known as the nayanars and classified as Paadal Petra Sthalam.

This temple is associated with an ardent devotee of Shiva who worshipped him against the wishes of her husband. The husband tried to break the Linga with an axe, giving the name Naduturaippar to the presiding deity and Kanrapur to the village. There are many inscriptions associated with the temple indicating contributions from Cholas. The oldest parts of the present masonry structure were built during the Chola dynasty during the 11th century, while later expansions, are attributed to later periods.

The temple houses a three-tiered gateway tower known as gopuram. The temple has numerous shrines, with those of Naduthuraiappar and Srivalli Nayagi being the most prominent. The temple complex houses many halls and two precincts. The temple has five daily rituals at various times from 6:30 a.m. to 8 p.m., and five yearly festivals on its calendar. The Vaikasi Visagam during the Tamil month of Vaikasi (May - June) is the most prominent festivals celebrated in the temple. The temple is now maintained and administered by Hindu Religious and Charitable Endowments Department of the Government of Tamil Nadu.

== Legend ==
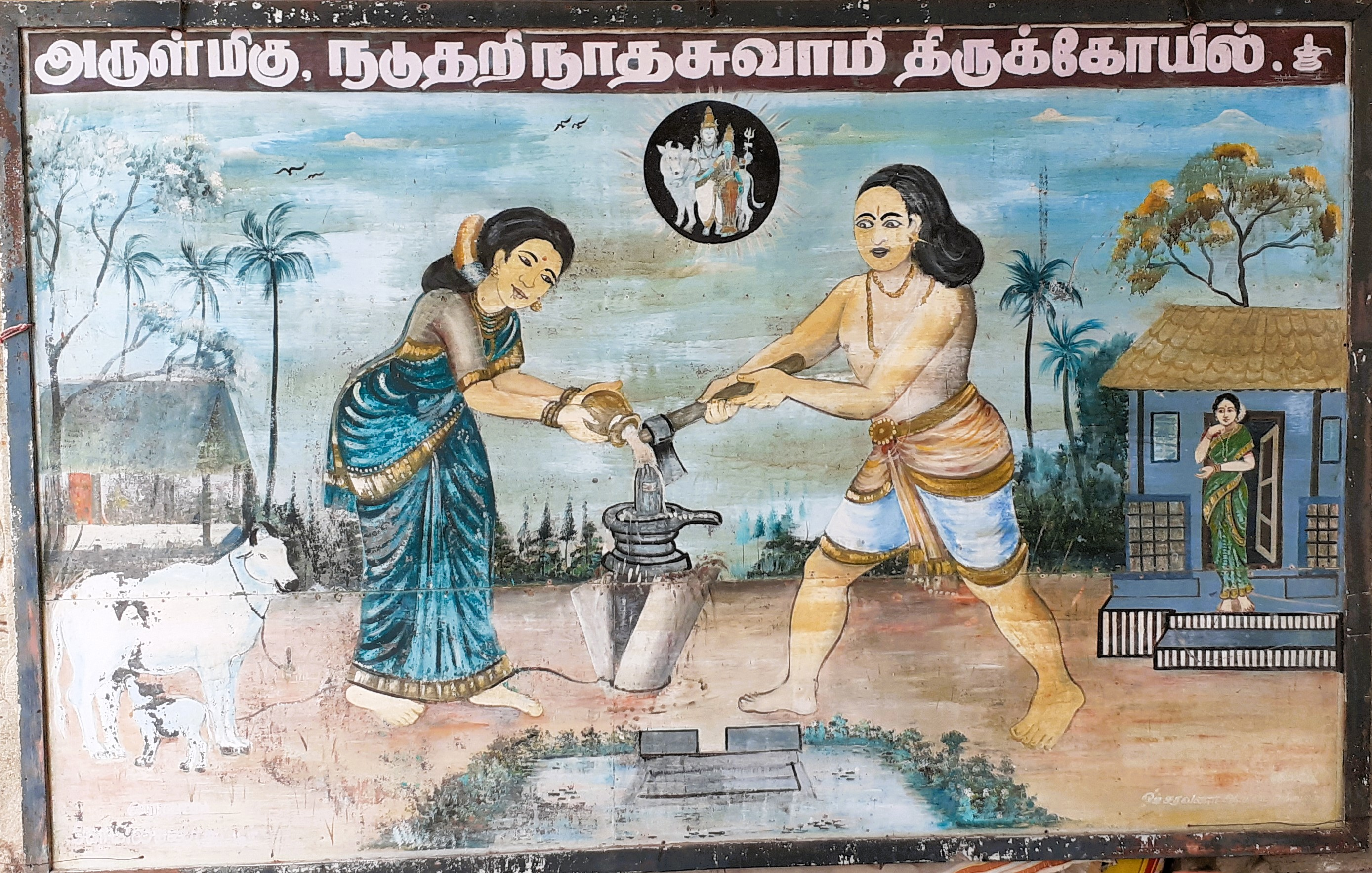
Image representing temple legend

As per Hindu legend, a Saivite girl married someone from the Vaishnavite community, but worshipped Linga (an iconic form of Shiva) secretively. As per tradition, Shaivites worship Shiva, while Vaishnavites worship Vishnu. These are two major sects in Hinduism. When her husband learned of the Linga in his house, he threw it in a well. The girl considered a wedge used to tie calves as Shiva and started worshipping Shiva. When her husband realised this and he tried to break the wedge with an axe. Shiva manifested out of a peg to which the calf was tied. Since Shiva came out of a wedge (Kanra in Tamil), he came to be known an Natuturaippar and place came to be known as Kanrapur. Pleased by the devotion of the girl, Shiva blessed the couple. Following the legend, a mark of axe cut is seen on the top of the icon of Linga in the temple.

== Architecture ==
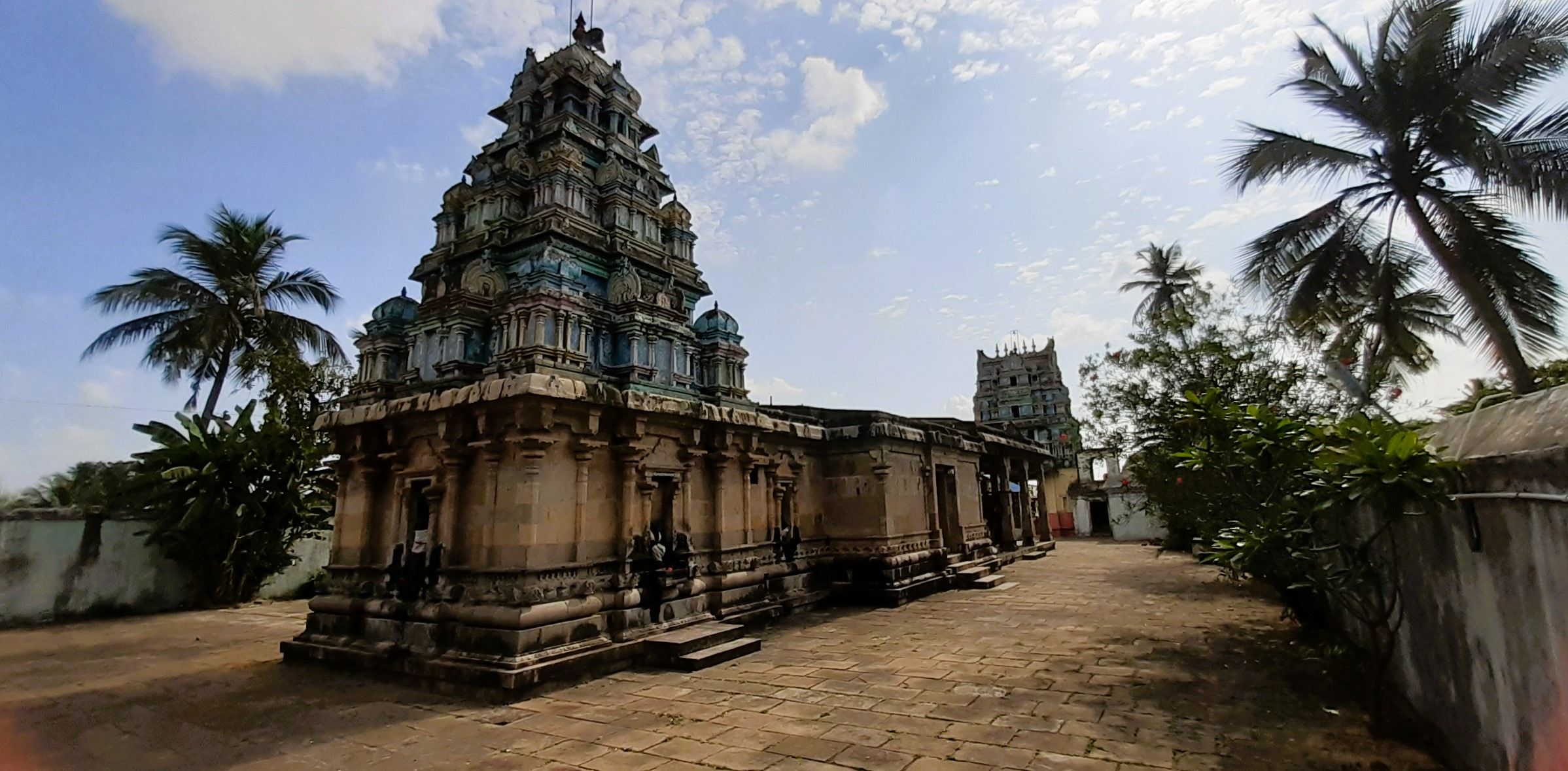
Image of the temple Gopuram

The temple is located 9 km away from Thiruthuraipoondi in the Tiruvarur - Thiruthuraipoondi road. The temple campus encompasses exclusive shrines for Nadutariappar Swamy (Shiva) and Srivalli Nayagi (Parvathi). The temple has a five-tiered rajagopuram, the entrance tower and all the shrines of the temple are enclosed in concentric rectangular granite walls. The temple covers an area of close to an 2 acres (0.81 ha). The temple has three prakarams (closed precincts of a temple) and many mandapams (halls). The temple faces east and is entered via the rajagopuram (gateway tower). The presiding deity in the form of lingam is housed in the sanctum. The attached hall, the ardhamandapa measures the same width as the sanctum, while its length is twice the sanctum. The ardhamandapa projects towards the east. The Mukhamandapa has a square structure. There are five devakoshtas that cover the exterior walls of the sanctum. The images of Dakshinamurthy and Brahma are the only ones remaining out of the five. The presiding deity of the temple is Nadutraiappar, housed in the sanctum. The consort Srivalli Nayagi, is located in a south facing shrine. The temple has four bodies of water associated with it. The principal water tank is called Gangamirtham, which is located outside the main entrance of the temple, while Sivagangai and Jnanamirtham being the other two temple tanks. In modern times, the temple is maintained and administered by the Hindu Religious and Charitable Endowments Department of the Government of Tamil Nadu.

== Worship and religious practices ==
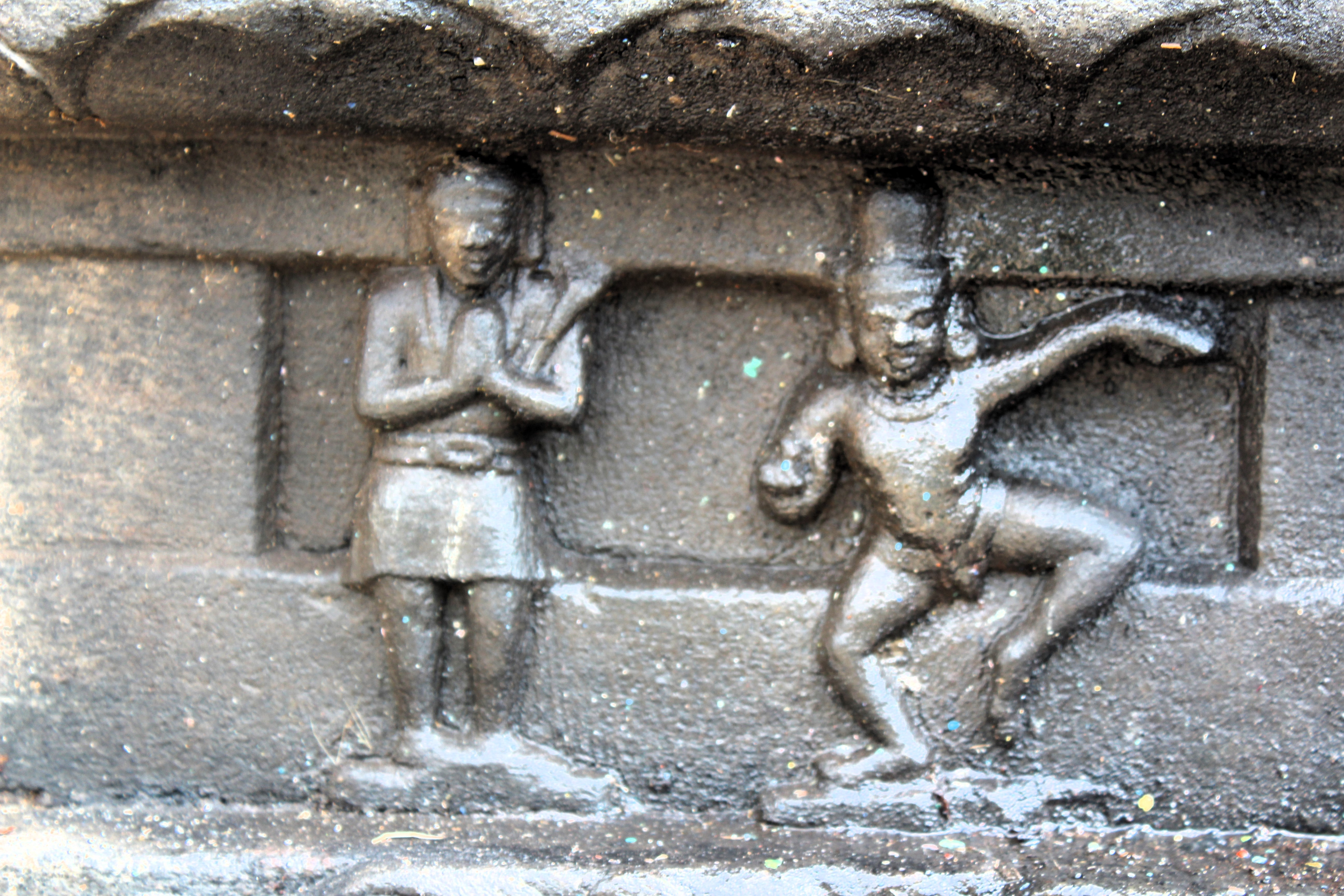
Sculpture of Appar and Sambandar

The temple priests perform the pooja (rituals) during festivals and on a daily basis. Like other Shiva temples of Tamil Nadu, the priests belong to the Shaivaite community, a Brahmin sub-caste. The temple rituals are performed five times a day; Ushathkalam at 6:00 a.m., Kalasanthi at 9:00 a.m., Uchikalam at 1:00 p.m., Sayarakshai at 5:00 p.m., and Ardha Jamam at 9:00 p.m. Each ritual comprises four steps: abhisheka (sacred bath), alangaram (decoration), neivethanam (food offering) and deepa aradanai (waving of lamps) for both Nadutariappar and Srivalli Amman. The worship is held amidst music with nagaswaram (pipe instrument) and tavil (percussion instrument), religious instructions in the Vedas (sacred text) read by priests and prostration by worshippers in front of the temple mast. There are weekly rituals like somavaram and sukravaram, fortnightly rituals like pradosham and monthly festivals like amavasai (new moon day), kiruthigai, pournami (full moon day) and sathurthi. The Brahmotsvam or prime festival is Vaikasi Visagam, celebrated for three days in the Tamil month of Vaikasi (May–June).

Appar, venerated Naduturiappar in ten verses in Tevaram, compiled as the Fifth Tirumurai. As per Appar, the Lord of Kanrappur is seen in the hearts of all his devotees to the extent of people wearing the sacred ash. As the temple is revered in Tevaram, it is classified as Paadal Petra Sthalam, one of the 275 temples that find mention in the Saiva canon. The place is where Hidimba is believed to have worshipped Shiva. The temple is considered one among the series of historic temples located in the Thiruvarur - Thiruthuraipoondi road.
