= Babar Naam Gandhiji =

2015 Indian Bengali film

- Directed by: Pavel
- Screenplay by: Pavel
- Produced by: Jalan International Films Pvt. Ltd.
- Starring: Parambrata chattopadhyay Surajit Mukherjee; Sayani Ghosh; Kaushik Sen; Sanjay Biswas; Srijita Chowdhuri; Debdut Ghosh
- Cinematography: Supriyo Dutta
- Edited by: Sanglap Bhowmik
- Music by: Raja Narayan &, Sanjay Mandal and Group
- Release date: 2 October 2015
- Running time: 165 minutes
- Country: India
- Language: Bengali

Babar Naam Gandhiji (Bengali-বাবার নাম গান্ধীজী) is a 2015 Bengali drama film directed by Pavel. This film features a 10 year old brothel boy Kencho, who has the misconception of Gandhiji as his dead father. The film was released on 2 October 2015.

Anandabazar Patrika described the film "an urban fairy tale".

== Plot ==
Kencho is a 10-year-old boy. He is a loner. He has been deserted at his birth at a dustbin and found by a beggar. As he grew up he also became an efficient beggar. He knew the ways to earn more than other beggars of his age. For example, he catches hold of the man going to pee on the roadside in hurry. He threatens him of informing the police and takes money. Sometimes he goes to the parks where couples are busy in kissing or something. He again threatens them of police and ushers 20/50 Rs from them. At night he has another source of income. There is a hospital nearby. In front of it there is pan dukan who sells phone top ups. Kencho buys the top ups from him and sells them at high price at night in emergency. Kencho calls a man NGO da, he used to do a high-profile corporate job once but his vocation was to work for people. Therefore, he left the job and now forming this, NGO da teaches the little boys and girls of the brothel. He loves Kencho very much and wants Kencho to read also, but Kencho enjoys earning money more than reading books. Kencho keeps whatever he earns in his NGO da's custody. This way he saves money both from the drunkards of the brothel and his spendthrift nature. NGO is in a live in relation with a girl called Trina, who also has a corporate job. But she does not like NGO da's activities and their regular quarrels have brought their relationship into the web.

One day Kencho stops a man peeing at roadside as usual. He asks Kencho, "is this your father’s road?" Kencho replied "yes" threatens him of police. Ironically the man himself was a policeman and he brings Kencho into the police station. The road where they argued was called the Mahatma Gandhi Road, and the policemen in the police station started to make fun of Kencho saying that it was his father's road, his father is Mahatma Gandhi. A senior police officer came and said that he knew his father very well and very politely persuades Kencho into believing that Mahatma Gandhi was truly his father. He took the joke seriously and thought they were truly speaking that Mahatma Gandhi was his father. He came running and asked the brothel pimp whether Mahatma Gandhi was really his father. She was very busy that day and without listening to Kencho's question she nods her head signalling yes. Then Kencho went and asked the same to NGO da. He thought that this idea might encourage Kencho to study and there was neither any harm calling "Bapuji" someone's father. So, he also said, "yes". Kencho became so happy that he celebrated his sonhood with others by giving them treat of kachori and ghughni. One day NGO da sent Kencho to a school to deliver an envelope. There he saw that children are rehearsing for 2 October in an open stage within the boundary of the school. He buys alukabli for himself and standing there watches them rehearsing. Suddenly he heard a sweet voice asked him, "do you want some jam-bread?" he replied, "no". she again said "my mother does not allow me to have alukabli". Kencho understands her will and gives her the alukabli. The name of this girl is Mini. Kencho says that his father was a lawyer turned social worker whose name is Mohandas Karamchand Gandhi and his mother also helps him in his work. They became friends. Kencho says that he would come again the next day. From then on they used to meet every day during the Tiffin break. One day Mini tells Kencho that the next day she would bring pati-sapta in Tiffin and share with kencho. On the next day, for a special cause, the school ceases after the first period. All the students go home but Mini waits there for Kencho. Kencho came at the Tiffin hour and when he came to know that the school was over, they loiter around the surrounding places. They had great fun all through the day, but at home Mini's parents were anxious and her father came to the school to ask about her. When he got the news that the school was long over, he had some hot arguments with the class teacher named Mr. Swami about their irresponsibility. Then he went home and found that Mini had come home with a boy. Mini excitedly tells the experience of the day to her father and mother and praises Kencho a lot. But her father was ill at ease in front of Kencho. He recognized Kencho to be the same boy who caught hold of him kissing and caressing his personal assistant within the car and took money from him. He simply avoided Kencho and asks his wife not to allow the boy inside their house.

On the next day Kencho again comes to the school gate at the Tiffin period and waits for Mini. When the class teacher sees this he comes and beats him because for him he was insulted by Mini's father. Kencho says, "how can you beat me sir, I am the son of Shree Mohandas Karamchand Gandhi. You will worship him within the school and beat his son outside it?" The teacher starts laughing and goes inside. Kencho shouts in a challenging voice towards him, "I shall take admission to this very school and then you will know the result of beating me". Then Kencho goes to NGO da and tells him that he, too, like his father wants to be an educated man, a lawyer. NGO da becomes very happy and asks him to come to his night school. But Kencho was not willing to read in a night school. Kencho was insistent that he would not read in an ordinary school as his father must had learnt lessons in London or some other big places. Kencho says that he himself had selected a good school for himself that is the school where Mini reads and this was the most famous school in the town. NGO da tried to say how impossible it was but Kencho was insistent and at last NGO da agreed to arrange something to get him admitted there.

Then the story moved on through a number of twists and sub plots. At the end of the story it will be revealed whether Kencho can retain his father's honor and get admission into the school.

== Cast ==
- Parambrata Chattopadhyay as NGOda
- Surajit Mukherjee as Kencho
- Sayani Ghosh as Trina
- Kaushik Sen as Bidyadhar Swami
- Sanjay Biswas as Sanjayda
- Srijita Chowdhuri as Mini
- Debdut Ghosh as Mini's father
- Mishka Halim as Mini's mother
- Shankar Debnath as Councilor
- Uday Shankar Pal as Khora Bhikhari
- Ritobrata Bandopadhyay as O.C.
- B.D. Mukherjee as Principal
