= Pandupole =

Ancient site in Rajasthan, India

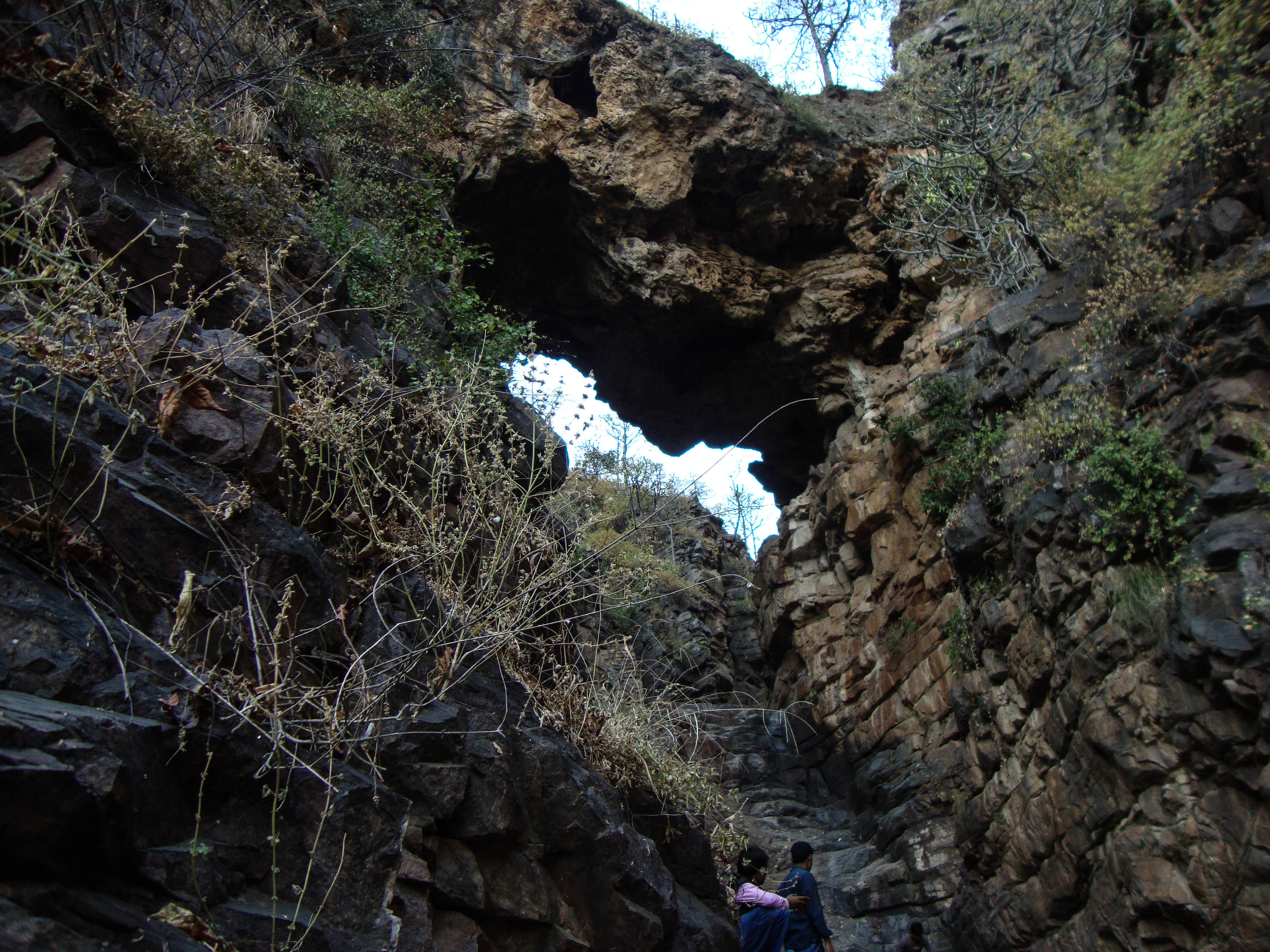
Pandupole

Pandupole is a tourist spot in the Sariska Tiger Reserve (Alwar district, Rajasthan), and it has an ancient mythical connotation attached to it. Pandupole was the ancient site where the strongest among the Pandavas, Bhima, vanquished the giant demon Hidimbb and in return for this victory earned the hand of his sister, Hidimba. It also has a cascading spring emerging from hard and compact rocks. Legend has it that the Pandava brother took refuge here during their exile. The main path takes to Pandupole which is not only a beautiful spot picturesque 35-ft waterfall is another attraction here and next to the fall is a charming little Hanuman temple. This area is abundant in langurs, peafowl, spurfowl, and ubiquitous tree pies. On the way to Pandupole, Karnakabas Lake, Brahmnath, Kalighati Chauki and Bhaironghati are also there.
