= Ahilawati =

Wife of Ghatotkacha in versions of the epic Mahabharata

Mauravi (Ahilawati)

In-universe information
- Aliases: Mauravi (Mourvi, Maurvi) and Kamkanthika
- Family: Mura or Vasuki (father), Hidimbi (Mother-in-Law), Bhima (Father-in-Law)
- Spouse: Ghatotkacha
- Children: Barbarika, Meghavarna and Anjanaparvan (Sons)

In regional versions of the Hindu epic Mahabharata, Ahilawati (Ahilāvati), also known as Mauravi (Mourvi, Maurvi) and Kamkanthika, was the wife of Ghatotkacha.

== Legend ==
Ahilawati or Maurvi was the daughter of Mura, the general of the demon Narakasura. The God Krishna, along with his wife Satyabhama, set forth to defeat Narakasura. First, Maurvi fought with Satyabhama. After Krishna killed Narakasura, he killed Maurvi's father, Mura. Maurvi decided to avenge her father's death. However, after realising the divinity of Krishna, she surrendered. Krishna consoled her by promising her that soon she would get married.

== Folktale ==
Ahilawati was a Nāga Kanyā (Snake-maiden). She was the daughter of Vasuki, the sacred serpent of the god Shiva. As per the tale, Ahilavati had been cursed by Shiva's wife Parvati for offering stale flowers to Shiva.
