= St. James' School (Kolkata) =

Coordinates: 22°33′18″N 88°21′56″E

- Emblem of St. James' School (Kolkata)

Location
- 165, Acharya Jagadish Chandra Bose Road, Kolkata 700014; Kolkata, West Bengal; India

Information
- Type: Private
- Motto: Pro Ecclesia Et Pro Patria (For Church and For Country)
- Religious affiliation: Church of North India
- Established: 1864; 162 years ago
- School board: Indian Certificate of Secondary Education (year 10); Indian School Certificate (year 12)
- Principal: Terence Hamilton Ireland
- Staff: Varies
- Enrollment: Varies
- Campus: There are currently two branches of St. James' School that are as follows :- Campus 1 - St. James' School, Kolkata, West Bengal, India ( situated in Entally ). Campus 2 - St. James' School, Behala, West Bengal, India ( situated in Paschim Barisha ).
- Nickname: Jacobeans
- Affiliation: Council for the Indian School Certificate Examinations
- Website: www.stjamesschoolkolkata.com

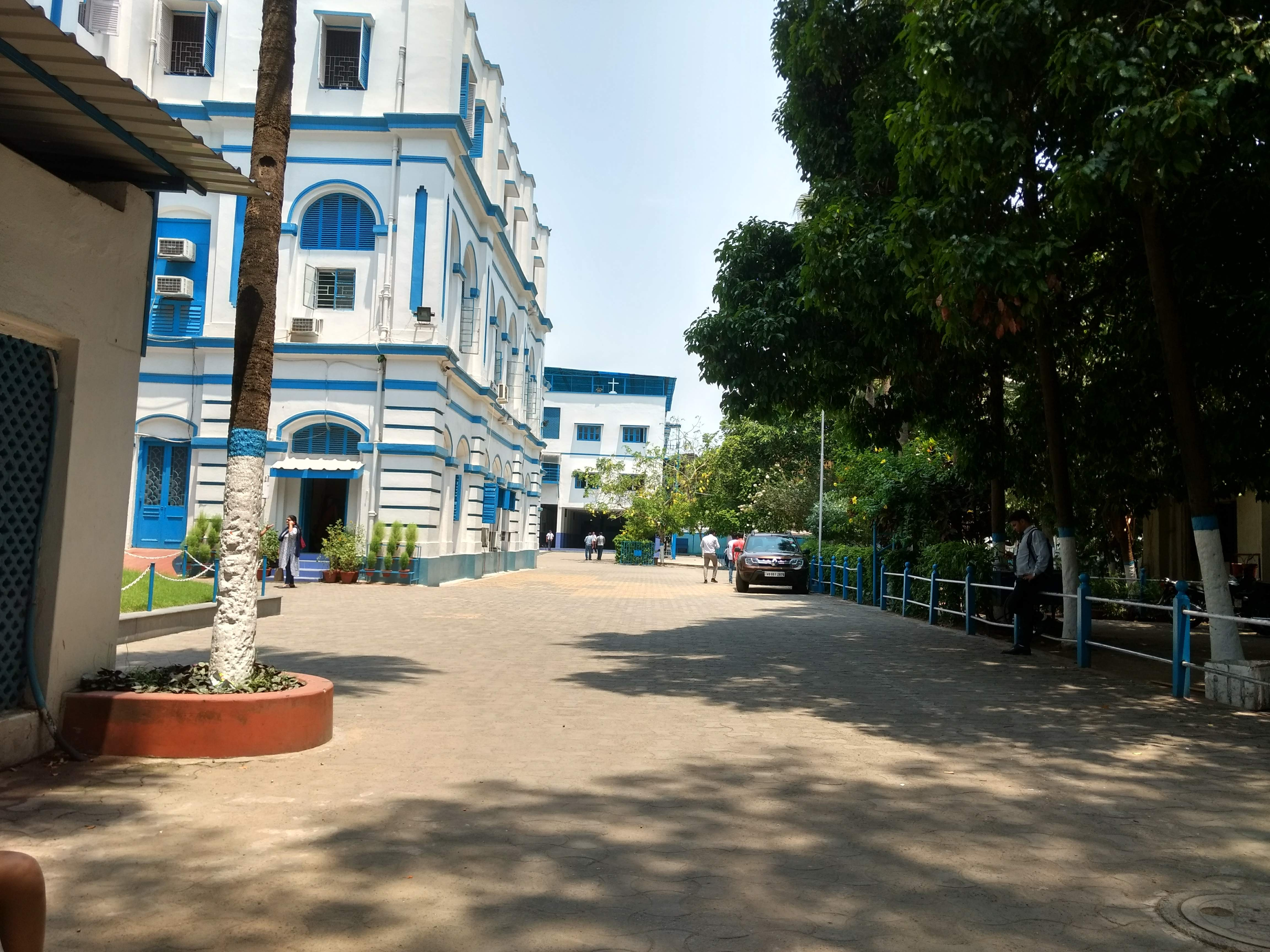
school premises

St. James' School, Kolkata, India, is a CNI school, and is one of the oldest private schools in India. It was founded on 25 July 1864 by Bishop Cotton, and celebrated its sesquicentenary (150 years) in July 2014. It is an all-boys school and is associated with the ICSE and ISC Board of Education. The school has four houses, which are Cotton, Copleston, Lefroy, and Westcott, each named after an English Bishop who served in India in the 19th century. In 1900, the hockey team of St. James' School won the prestigious Beighton Cup title.

== Notable alumni ==
- Arjun Atwal, Indian professional golfer
- Somnath Bharadwaj, Indian theoretical physicist
- Sourav Chatterjee, Indian Mathematician, Professor at Stanford University
- Ashish Dhawan, Indian philanthropist and former private equity investor
- Ujaan Ganguly, Indian actor
- Sujoy Ghosh, Indian actor, film director, producer and screenwriter
- Rajesh Gopakumar, Indian theoretical physicist
- Kiyan Nassiri, Indian Footballer
- Pritam, Indian composer, singer and music producer
- Sanjeev Sanyal, Indian economist, popular historian and author
