= Kolkata Chalantika =

2022 Indian Bengali-language film

- Directed by: Pavel
- Written by: Pavel; Swati Biswas
- Produced by: Satadru Chakraborty
- Starring: Saurav Das; Ishaa Saha; Aparajita Auddy; Satabdi Chakraborty; Ditipriya Roy; Kharaj Mukherjee Kiran Dutta
- Cinematography: Subrata Mallick
- Music by: Ranajoy Bhattacharjee, Souptik Mazumder
- Distributed by: Baba Bhootnath Entertainment
- Release date: 25 August 2022
- Running time: 100 minutes
- Country: India
- Language: Bengali

Kolkata Chalantika (transl. Kolkata's Kinetic Tale; Bengali pronunciation: [kolkata tʃolontika]) is a 2022 Indian Bengali-language drama film directed and written by Pavel. The film stars an ensemble cast and is based on the 2016 Kolkata flyover collapse.

== Plot ==
Based on the 2016 Kolkata flyover collapse, the film relates the lives of many people from the city Kolkata, and shows how the unfortunate incident affects them and brings about a change in their lifestyle.

== Cast ==
- Saurav Das as Baichung
- Ishaa Saha as Tumpa
- Aparajita Auddy as Constable Debi
- Satabdi Chakraborty as Rimi
- Ditipriya Roy as Ador
- Kharaj Mukherjee as Banka Da
- Anirban Chakrabarti as Shibaji
- Kiran Dutta as Aabesh
- Rajatava Dutta
- Anamika Saha
- Shovan Kamila as Sumit
- Pavel

== Soundtrack ==
Kolkata Chalantika

Soundtrack album by Ranajoy Bhattacharjee
- Released: 2022
- Genre: Feature film soundtrack
- Length: 26:19
- Language: Bengali
- Label: Times Music Bangla

Track listing
No.	Title	Singer(s)	Length
1.	"Geetabitan Er Dibbi (Female Vocals)"	Pritha Chatterjee	4:06
2.	"Moddhyo Raater Gaan"	Lagnajita Chakraborty	3:53
3.	"Kolkata Chalantika"	Ranajoy Bhattacharjee	4:45
4.	"Dindupurer Gaan"	Lagnajita Chakraborty	3:39
5.	"Dindupurer Gaan (Reprise)"	Arnab Dutta	3:49
6.	"Geetabitan Er Dibbi (Male)"	Ranajoy Bhattacharjee	4:06
7.	"Kolkata Chalantika (Sitar Theme)"	Preetam Banerjee, Ranajoy Bhattacharjee	2:01
Total length:			26:19

== Release ==
The film was reviewed by Sangbad Pratidin.
