= Lokkhi Chele =

2022 Indian Bengali film directed by Kaushik Ganguly

- Directed by: Kaushik Ganguly
- Produced by: Nandita Roy; Shiboprosad Mukherjee
- Starring: Ujaan Ganguly; Ritwika Pal; Purab Seal Acharya
- Cinematography: Gopi Bhagat
- Edited by: Subhajit Singha
- Music by: Prabuddha Banerjee
- Production company: Windows Production
- Distributed by: Windows Production
- Release date: 26 August 2022
- Country: India
- Language: Bengali

Lokkhi Chele (transl. Good boy) is a 2022 Indian Bengali language action socio-drama film written and directed by Kaushik Ganguly. The film is produced by Nandita Roy and Shiboprosad Mukherjee under the banner of Windows Production. The film stars Ujaan Ganguly as the protagonist.

== Plot ==
A specially abled child with four arms is born to a lower caste family in the remote village of Hijalganj. The villagers, filled with religious superstitions, believe her to be the incarnation of Goddess Laxmi. The upper class elites of the village begin using her for their selfish monetary reasons.

Amir Hussain, Gayatri Chatterjee and Shibnath Dutta, three junior doctors from Kolkata, come across the child. They realize that, if not treated immediately, the child would not survive. However, the child's family refuse to believe their words and threaten them with dire consequences if they try to take away the child for treatment. Left with no other option, the trio steal the child with the help of her mother and take her to Kolkata with them.

With help from their teacher Dr. Mitali Sen, her estranged IAS officer husband Rwitobroto Sen, news reporter Joy Mitra and Amir's lawyer father Anwar Hussain, the trio manage to get the child treated successfully at a hospital in Bhubaneswar. However, when they try to return the child, none of the villagers, except the child's mother, agree to accept her as their own. While Gayatri and Shib manage to flee with the child, Amir is caught by the local politician and his goons. They badly beat him, to the point that he is left paralyzed and his brain is damaged.

The movie shifts to a few years later. Everyone is celebrating Amir's birthday. It is shown that Laxmi has been adopted by Mitali's house-help Gopa. The movie ends on an emotional note with Amir, wheelchair-ridden and unable to speak, affectionately holding Laxmi's hand.

== Cast ==
- Ujaan Ganguly as Amir Hussain
- Ritwika Pal as Gayatri Chatterjee
- Purab Seal Acharya as Shibnath Dutta
- Indrasish Roy as Rajat Narayan Ray
- Pradip Bhattacharya as Haren Khuro
- Ambarish Bhattacharya as Joy Mitra
- Churni Ganguly as Dr. Mitali Sen
- Babul Supriyo as Rwitobroto Sen
- Manosree Biswas as Gopa
- Joydip Mukherjee as Anwar Hussain, Amir's father

== Soundtrack ==
Lokkhi Chele

Soundtrack album by Prabuddha Banerjee
- Released: 2022
- Genre: Feature film soundtrack
- Length: 10:43
- Language: Bengali
- Label: Windows Production

Track listing
No.	Title	Singer(s)	Length
1.	"Lokkhi Chhele"	Somlata Acharyya Chowdhury	3:16
2.	"Haar Na Manar Gaan"	Timir Biswas, Anasmita Ghosh, Chandrika Bhattacharya, Debolina Sinha Ray, Disha Roy	3:45
3.	"Kalo Jole Kuchla Tole"	Ujaan Ganguly, Purab Seal Acharya	3:42
Total length:			10:43

== Release ==
The film was released theatrically on 26 August 2022.

== Reception ==
In OTTplay, Shamayita Chakraborty wrote, "Lokhi Chele is a must-watch. Besides the issue that the film deals with, its treatment, violence, disturbance and subtle non-linear storytelling are something that we have not seen in Bengali films for a while. There are problems in the film and yet we must encourage our friends, family members and colleagues to watch it just for the sake of the issue it deals with. Lokkhi Chele is an unsettling film that should be watched and rewatched until we see an end to the dark reality of superstitions in India". Aritra Banerjee from Film Companion stated "It is an entertaining film, it is a very engaging film. At the same time, it is a very honest film", praising the film's screenplay, acting performances, cinematography and editing. The Indian Express gave a mixed review: "It tries to critique religious dogmatism but its ambitions are marred because of an almost amateurish screenplay".
