= Hidimba Devi Temple =

Hindu temple in Himachal Pradesh, India

- Location in India

Religion
- Affiliation: Hinduism
- District: Kullu
- Deity: Hidimbi
- Festival: Dhungari Mela

Location
- State: Himachal Pradesh
- Country: India
- Interactive map of Hidimba Devi Temple
- Coordinates: 32.24228°N 77.187366°E

Architecture
- Type: Pagoda
- Completed: 1553

Hidimba Devi Temple, locally known as Dhungari Temple, also known variously as the Hadimba Temple, is a Hindu Temple, located in Manāli, a hill station in the State of Himāchal Pradesh in north India. It is an ancient cave temple dedicated to Hidimbi Devi, wife of Bhima, a figure in the Indian epic Mahābhārata. The temple is surrounded by a cedar forest called Dhungiri Van Vihar at the foot of the Himālayas. The sanctuary is built over a huge rock jutting out of the ground which was worshiped as an image of the deity. The structure was built in 1553 by Maharaja Bahadur Singh.

The Hidimba Devi temple is 24 meters tall.

== History ==
The Hidimba Devi temple was built in 1553 CE by Maharaja Bahadur Singh. The temple is built around a cave where Devi Hidimba performed meditation. Hidimbi was supposed to have lived there with her brother Hidimb, and not much is known about their parents. Born into a Rakshasa family, Hidimba vowed to marry one who would defeat her brother Hidimb, who was supposed to be very brave and fearless. During the Pandava's exile, when they visited Manali, Bhima, one of the five Pandavas defeated Hidimb. Thereafter, Hidimba married Bhima and gave birth to their son Ghatotkacha.

== Worship of Goddess Hidimba ==
The veneration of Hidimba Devi holds significant cultural prominence in Manali, where she is revered as a deity. While Navaratri conventionally sees the worship of Goddess Durga, the spiritual spotlight in Manali shifts to Goddess Hidimba. The temple draws considerable crowds, particularly during Navaratri, attesting to the fervent devotion of the worshippers. Annually, the locals enthusiastically observe the Hidimba Devi Fair, a cherished tradition coinciding with the arrival of spring.

== Design ==
The Hidimba Devi Temple has intricately carved wooden doors and a 24-meter-tall wooden "shikhar" or tower above the sanctuary. The tower consists of three square roofs covered with timber tiles and a fourth brass cone-shaped roof at the top. The earth goddess Durga forms the theme of the main door carvings. Also depicted are animals, foliate designs, dancers, scenes from Lord Krishna’s life and Navagrahas. The temple base is made out of whitewashed, mud-covered stonework. An enormous rock occupies the inside of the temple, only a 7.5 cm (3 inch) tall brass image representing goddess Hidimba Devi. A rope hangs down in front of the rock, and according to a legend, in bygone days religious zealots would tie the hands of "sinners" by the rope and then swing them against the rock.

About seventy metres away from the temple, there is a shrine dedicated to Goddess Hidimba's son, Ghatotkacha, who was born after she married Bhima. The most surprising feature of the temple or what believers could call the most reassuring feature of the temple is the fact that inside the temple the imprint of the feet of the Goddess carved on a block of stone is worshipped.

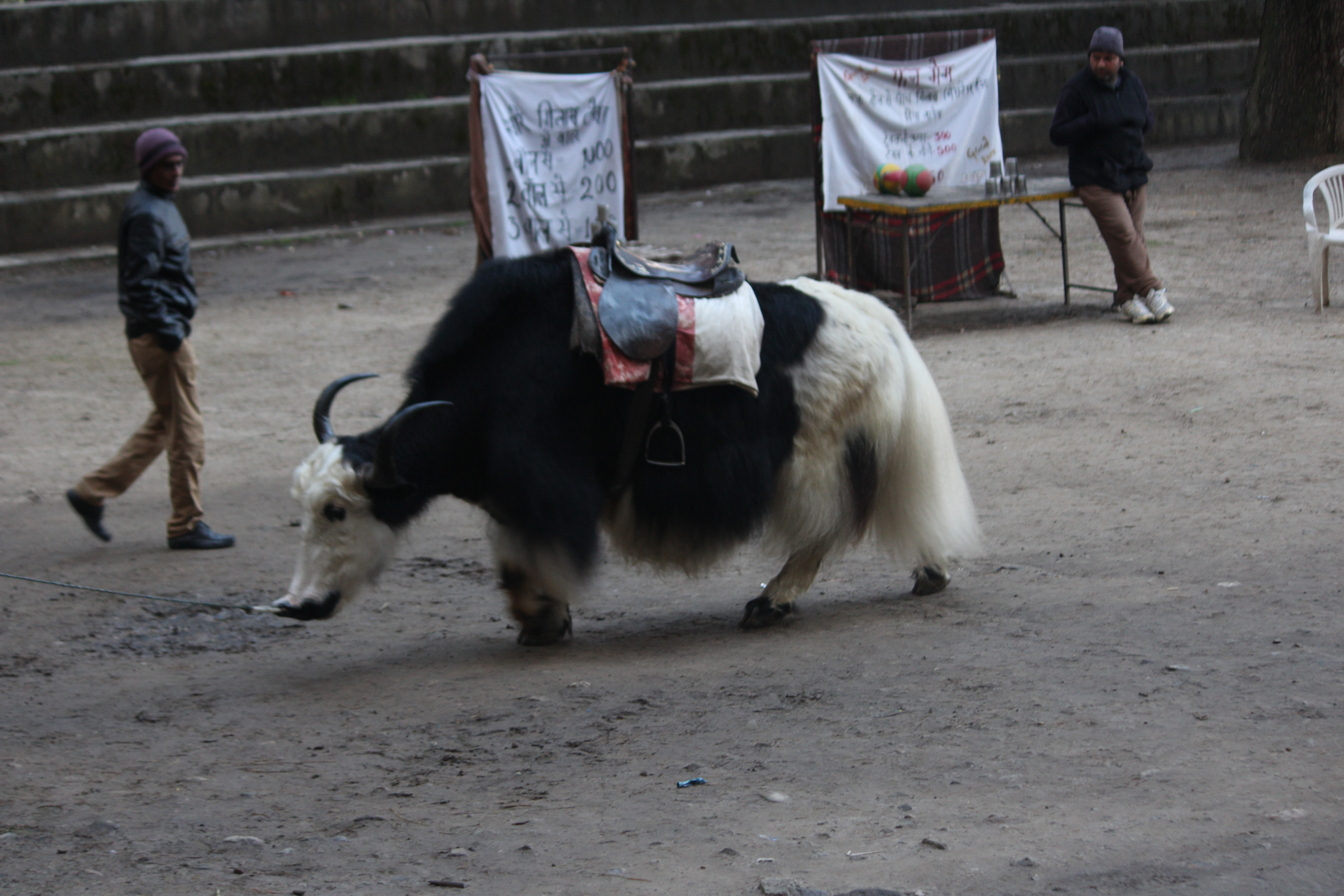
A yak near the Hadimba temple, Manali, Himachal Pradesh

== A Mahabharat narration ==
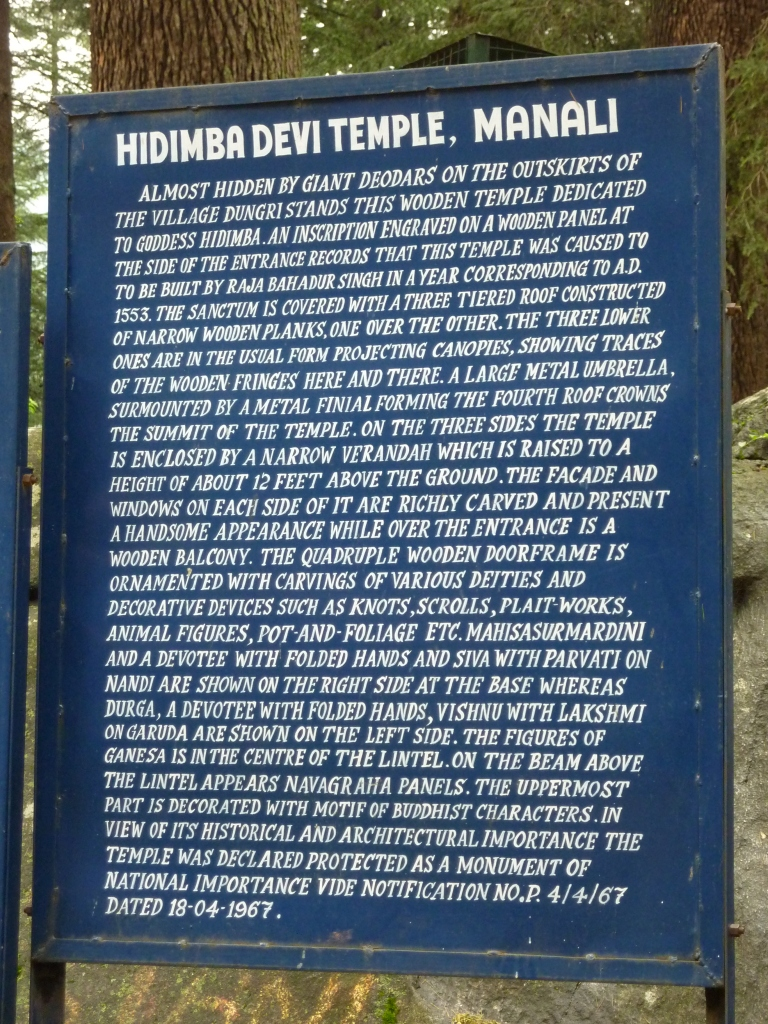
Sign at Hidimba Devi Temple

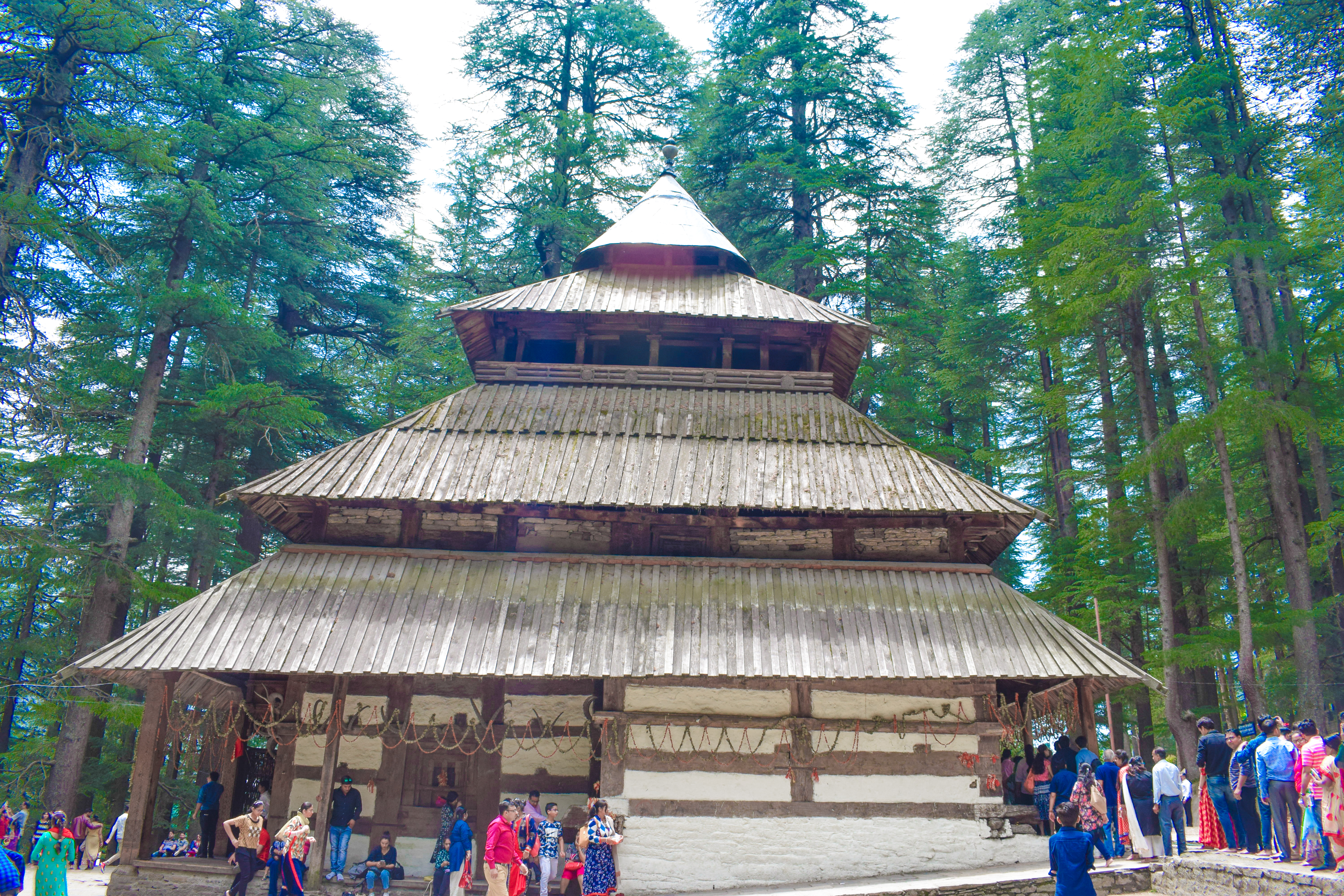
Side View Hidimba Devi Temple

The Indian epic Mahabharata narrates that the Pāndavas stayed in Himachal during their exile. In Manali, the strongest person there, named Hidimb and brother of Hidimba, attacked them, and in fight Bhima, strongest amongst the Pandavas, killed him. Bhima and Hidimb's sister, Hidimbi, then got married and had a son, Ghatotkacha, (who later proved to be a great warrior in the war against Kauravas). When Bhima and his brothers returned from exile, Hidimbi did not accompany him, but stayed back and did tapasyā (a combination of meditation, prayer, and penance) so as to eventually attain the status of a goddess.

== Gallery ==
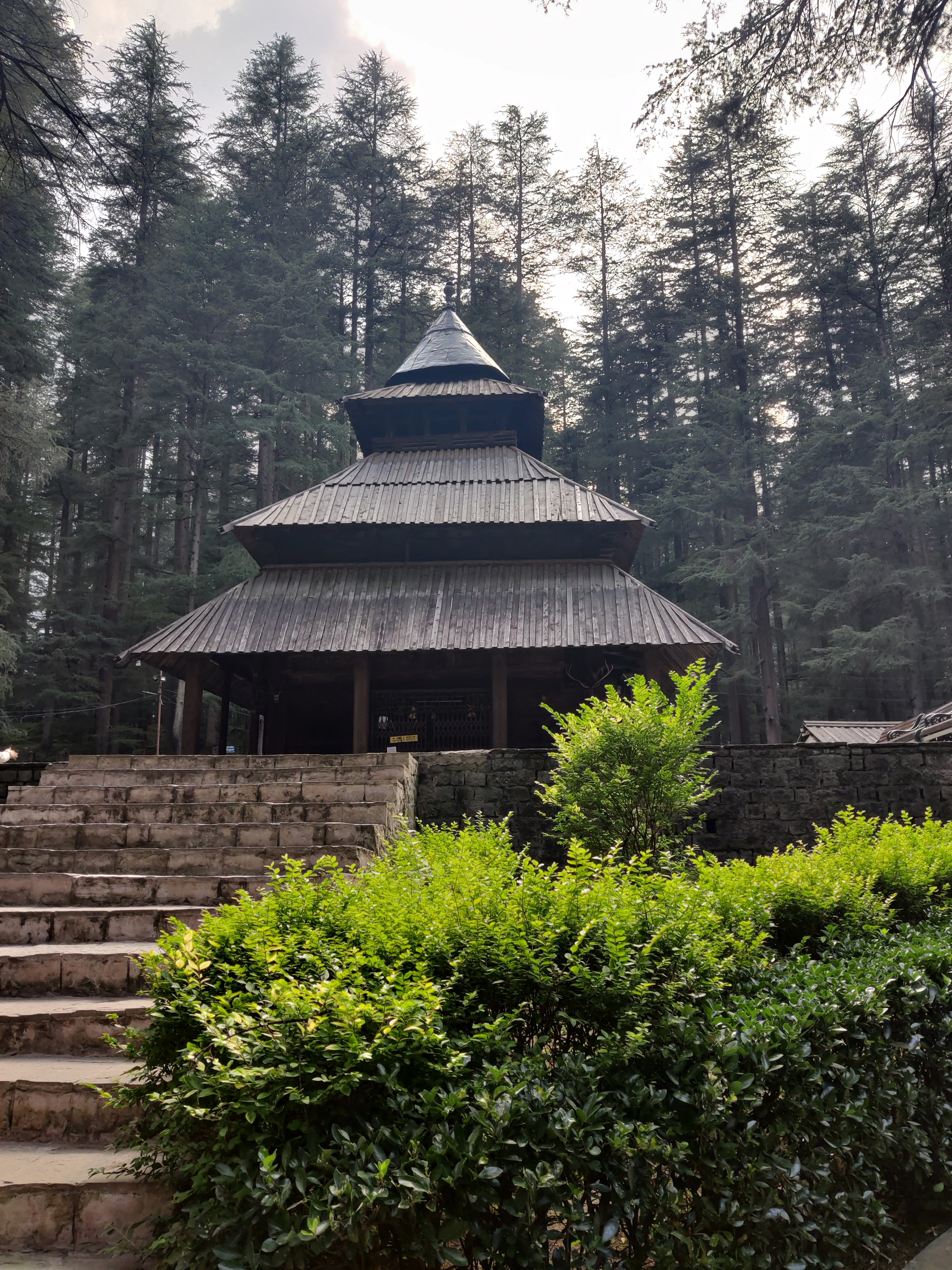
Hidimba Devi Temple

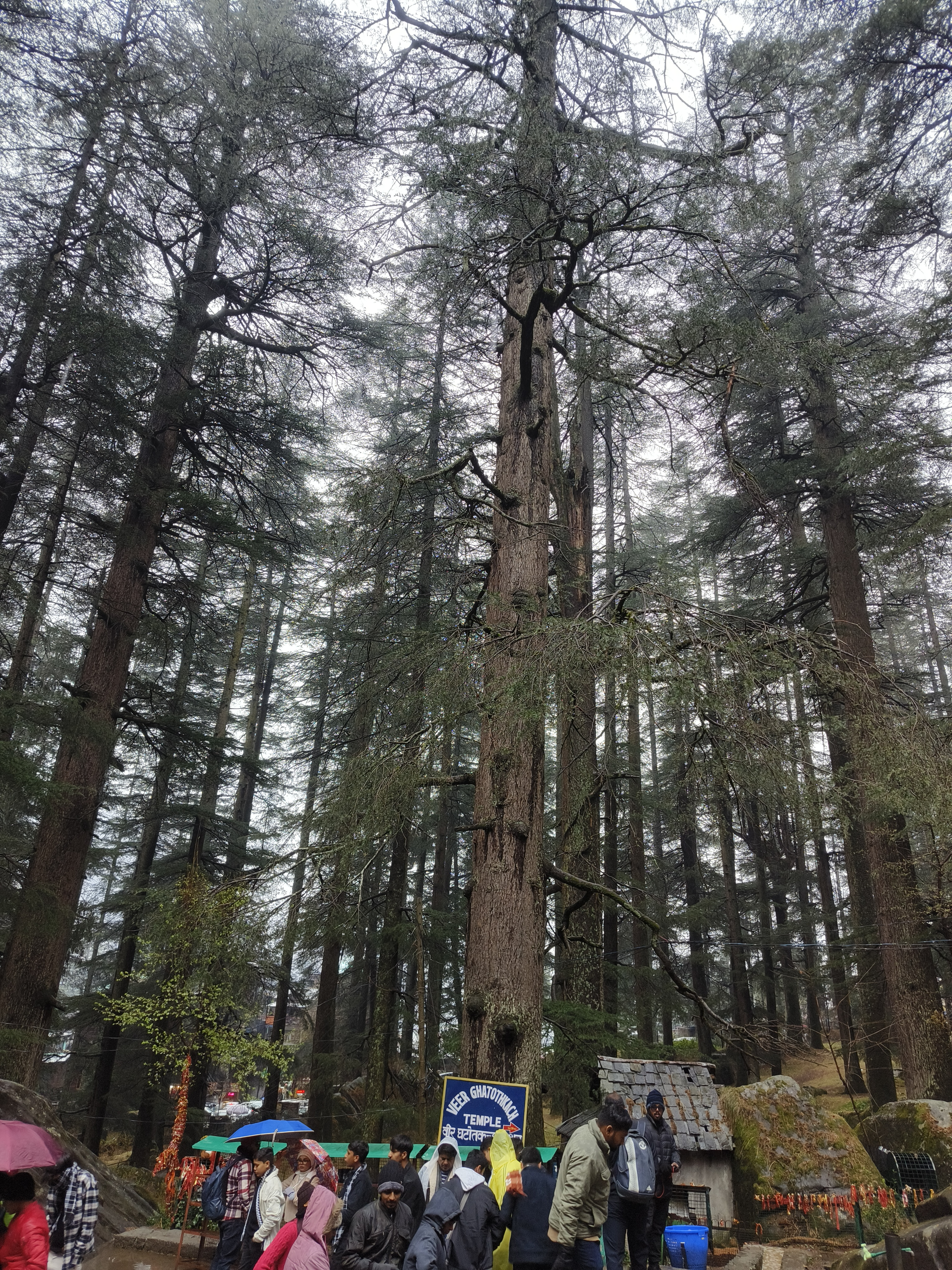
Cedar Forest around Hadimba Devi Temple
