= Rosogolla (film) =

- Theatrical release poster
- Directed by: Pavel
- Written by: Smaranjit Chakraborty and Pavel
- Screenplay by: Smaranjit Chakraborty and Pavel
- Story by: Smaranjit Chakraborty and Pavel
- Produced by: Nandita Roy and Shiboprosad Mukherjee
- Starring: Ujaan Ganguly; Abantika Biswas; Rajatava Dutta; Kharaj Mukherjee; Kaushik Sen; Subhashree Ganguly; Aparajita Auddy
- Cinematography: Supriyo Dutta
- Music by: Arnab Dutt
- Production company: Windows Production
- Distributed by: Windows Production
- Release date: 21 December 2018 (India)
- Country: India
- Language: Bengali

Rosogolla (transl. Syrup-filled ball) is a 2018 Indian Bengali-language historical drama film directed and written by Pavel. Rosogolla marks the big screen debut of Ujaan Ganguly and Abantika Biswas. It is a fictionalized biopic of Nobin Chandra Das, a sweet maker from Kolkata, the inventor of Rosogolla.

== Plot ==
Rosogolla is based on the real-life story of the inventor of Bengal's own ‘Rosogolla’. The story revolves around the life and work of Nobin Chandra Das, a young man with a romantic heart and a brilliant mind. Nobin Chandra Das's father dies soon after Nobin's birth and his family faces a financial crisis. Nobin decides to become a sweet maker. With a zeal to create something fresh and unique, Nobin had set his heart on making the most delicious sweet of all time for his wife, Khirodmoni.

After undergoing several trials and tribulations, which include alienating himself from his loved ones, Das finally emerges victorious and ends up creating one of the best things that could ever happen to all the Bengalis. Failure, misfortune, insult, nothing could stop Nobin. Khirodmoni Devi, his wife, has the courage to run a business in that era. This invention makes him famous in Bengal. Based in 19th century Bengal, Rosogolla is an innocent story of love, struggle and the human aspiration to do something new.

== Cast ==
- Ujaan Ganguly as Nobin Chandra Das
- Abantika Biswas as Khirodmoni Devi
- Kharaj Mukherjee as Mahesh
- Rajatabha Dutta as Kalidas Indra
- Bidipta Chakraborty as Nobin Chandra's mother
- Aparajita Auddy as Zamindar ginni
- Chiranjeet Chakraborty as Braja Palowan
- Kaushik Sen as Amritalal Banik
- Shantilal Mukherjee as Chandu Babu/Vaikuntha Ganguly
- Shudrujeet Dutta
- Biswajeet Sarkar
- Abhijeet Sarkar
- Rahul Ananda
- Broto Banerjee
- Projgan Ghosh
- Tamal Ray Choudhury

=== Cameo appearances ===
- Anamika Saha
- Laboni Sarkar
- Pabon Kanoriya
- Asim Mukhopadhyay
- Subhashree Ganguly as Malkanjaan

== Soundtrack ==
No.	Title	Singer(s)	Length
1.	"Tapur Tupur"	Arnab Dutta	4:40
2.	"Khodar Banda"	Arko	3:37
3.	"Dhire Dhire"	Timir Biswas	3:48
4.	"Keno Asibo Bole"	Rishi Chakraborty, Mausumi Dutta	3:04
5.	"Kajol Bhramara"	Amit Sur, Mausumi Dutta	4:06
6.	"Na Chhedo Saiyan" (Hindi song)	Indrani Mukherjee	4:19
7.	"Jugal Milan Hoilo"	Sumon, Abhishruti, Sonali, Jesida	1:14
8.	"Rosogolla anthem"	Anupam Roy, Arko	5:23
