= Pawan Kalra =

Indian voice artist

- Born: Mumbai, India
- Occupation: Voice actor

Pawan Kalra is an Indian voice artist that has performed voices for documentaries and has also dubbed many foreign media in Hindi, who currently works for Sugar Mediaz. He is confirmed to be the official Hindi voice-dubbing artist for Arnold Schwarzenegger in India.

He speaks English and Hindi as his mother-tongue languages, but he majorly uses the Hindi language to perform voice dub-over roles in India.

== Television filmography ==
Year	Title	Role	Language	Notes
2025	Kurukshetra: The Great War of Mahabharata	Duryodhana	Hindi	Netflix animated series

== Dubbing career ==
His elder brother Pankaj Kalra, was already a Hindi voice dubbing artist at the time, before he introduced Pawan into the Voice-dubbing business. He first started performing Hindi dubbing roles with Discovery, Cartoon Network, Pogo, Nickelodeon and Disney Channel programs. Some of the programs that he dubbed in Hindi airs on Pogo. He is the official Hindi dub-over voice artist for Austro-American actor, Arnold Schwarzenegger.

== Dubbing roles ==
=== Animated series ===
Program title	Original voice	Character	Dub language	Original language	Number of episodes	Original airdate	Dubbed airdate	Notes
Bob the Builder	Neil Morrissey (UK); Greg Proops (USA)	Bob	Hindi	English		4/12/1999- Current		
Make Way for Noddy	Jimmy Hibbert	Mr. Plod	Hindi	English				
Pokémon	Unknown voice actor	Unknown character	Hindi	Japanese	1000+	4/1/1997-Current		
The Adventures of Tintin	Unknown voice actor	Laszlo Carreidas	Hindi	English; French	39	1991–1992	2013	Episode: "Flight 714"
Love, Death & Robots	Fred Tatasciore	Flynn	Hindi	English	18 (dubbed 1)	March 15, 2019 – present		Episode: "Sucker of Souls"
Young Justice	Phil LaMarr	Arthur Curry / Orin / Aquaman	Hindi	English	52	November 26, 2010 - March 16, 2013	2017-2018	
Invincible	J. K. Simmons	Nowl-Ahn / Nolan Grayson / Omni-Man	Hindi	English	17	March 25, 2021 - Present	March 25, 2021 - Present	Streaming on Amazon Prime Video
Batman: Caped Crusader	Toby Stephens	James Craddock / The Gentleman Ghost	Hindi	English	10 (dubbed 1)	August 1, 2024	August 1, 2024	Episode: "Night Ride"

=== Live action television series ===
Program title	Actor	Character	Dub language	Original language	Episodes	Original airdate	Dubbed airdate	Notes
Power Rangers Lightspeed Rescue	Ron Rogge	Captain William Mitchell	Hindi	English		2/12/2000-11/18/2000		Based on Japanese Tokusatsu, Kyuukyuu Sentai GoGoFive.
Power Rangers Megaforce/Super Megaforce	Geoff Dolan	Gosei, Gosei Morpher, Robo Morpher	Hindi	English				Based on Japanese Tokusatsu, Tensou Sentai Goseiger and Kaizoku Sentai Gokaiger.
Adını Feriha Koydum	Eray Özbay; Murat Onuk	Ünal Sarrafoğlu	Hindi	Turkish		1/14/2011-6/28/2012	9/15/2015-Ongoing	Airs on Zee Zindagi dubbed in Hindi.
The Witcher	Henry Cavill	Geralt of Rivia	Hindi	English		20/12/2019– present		
Daredevil	Peter McRobbie	Father Paul Lantom	Hindi	English	39	April 10, 2015 – October 19, 2018		
Mindhunter	Holt McCallany	Bill Tench	Hindi	English	Unknown	Unknown	Unknown	

=== Live action films ===
==== Foreign language films ====
Film title	Actor	Character	Dub language	Original language	Original Year release	Dub Year release	Notes
Licence to Kill	Timothy Dalton	James Bond 007	Hindi	English	1989	Unknown	
True Lies	Arnold Schwarzenegger	Harry Tasker	Hindi	English	1994	2004	
Hocus Pocus	Unknown Actor	Unknown role	Hindi	English	1993		
The Nutty Professor	Eddie Murphy	Professor Sherman Klump	Hindi	English	1996		
Dr. Dolittle	Eddie Murphy	Dr. John Dolittle	Hindi	English	1998	????	
The Lord of the Rings: The Fellowship of the Ring	Sean Bean	Boromir	Hindi	English	2001	2002	
Harry Potter and the Chamber of Secrets (film)	Jason Isaacs	Lucius Malfoy	Hindi	English	2002	2002	
The Lord of the Rings: The Two Towers	Sean Bean	Boromir	Hindi	English	2002	2003	
The Lord of the Rings: The Return of the King	Sean Bean	Boromir	Hindi	English	2003	2004	
Blade II	Wesley Snipes	Eric Brooks / Blade	Hindi	English	2002	2002	Samay Raj Thakkar dubbed this role in the previous movie.
Spy Game	Brad Pitt	Tom Bishop	Hindi	English	1999	2006	
Troy	Eric Bana	Hector	Hindi	English	2004	2004	Dubbed for the theatrical, home media and television releases.
Van Helsing	Hugh Jackman	Gabriel Van Helsing	Hindi	English	2004	2006 (TV version)	
Sin City	Bruce Willis	Det. John Hartigan	Hindi	English	2005	2006	
Harry Potter and the Goblet of Fire (film)	Jason Isaacs	Lucius Malfoy	Hindi	English	2005	2005	
Harry Potter and the Order of the Phoenix (film)	Jason Isaacs	Lucius Malfoy	Hindi	English	2007	2007	
Harry Potter and the Half-Blood Prince (film)	Jason Isaacs	Lucius Malfoy	Hindi	English	2009	2009	
Harry Potter and the Deathly Hallows – Part 1	Jason Isaacs	Lucius Malfoy	Hindi	English	2010	2010	
Harry Potter and the Deathly Hallows – Part 2	Jason Isaacs	Lucius Malfoy	Hindi	English	2011	2011	
Guardian of the Galaxy	Dave Bautista	Drax the Destroyer	Hindi	English	2014	2014	
Guardians of the Galaxy Vol. 2	Dave Bautista	Drax the Destroyer	Hindi	English	2017	2017	
Avengers: Infinity War	Dave Bautista	Drax the Destroyer	Hindi	English	2018	2018	
Avengers: Endgame	Dave Bautista	Drax the Destroyer	Hindi	English	2019	2019	
The Martian	Chiwetel Ejiofor	Vincent Kapoor	Hindi	English	2015	2015	
Doctor Strange	Chiwetel Ejiofor	Karl Mordo	Hindi	English	2016	2016	
Deadpool 2	Josh Brolin	Cable	Hindi	English	2018	2018	
Blade: Trinity	Dominic Purcell	Dracula / Drake	Hindi	English	2004		Aired by UTV Action.
Priest	Paul Bettany	Priest	Hindi	English	2011		Aired by UTV Action.
Enola Holmes	Henry Cavill	Sherlock Holmes	Hindi	English	2020	2020	
Beverly Hills Cop: Axel F	Eddie Murphy	Axel Foley	Hindi	English	2024	2024	
8 Mile	Paul Bates	Manny	Hindi	English	2002	Unknown	
Dolemite Is My Name	Eddie Murphy	Rudy Ray Moore	Hindi	English	2019	2019	Exclusively available on Netflix
Candy Cane Lane	Eddie Murphy	Chris Carver	Hindi	English	2023	2023	Exclusively Available On Amazon
Bumblebee	John Cena	Agent Burns	Hindi	English	2018	2019	
F9: The Fast Saga	John Cena	Jakob Toretto	Hindi	English	2021	2021	
Fast X	John Cena	Jakob Toretto	Hindi	English	2023	2023	
Pitch Black	Vin Diesel	Riddick	Hindi	English	2000	2000	Exclusively Available on Amazon
The Chronicles Of Riddick	Vin Diesel	Riddick	Hindi	English	2004	2004	Exclusively Available on Amazon
The Last Witch Hunter	Vin Diesel	Kaulder	Hindi	English	2015	2015	Exclusively Available on Amazon
Spider-Man: No Way Home	Chiwetel Ejiofor	Karl Mordo	Hindi	English	2021	2021	
Doctor Strange in the Multiverse of Madness	Chiwetel Ejiofor	Karl Mordo	Hindi	English	2022	2022	Archit Maurya dubbed this character's variant in Venom: The Last Dance.
Thor: Love and Thunder	Dave Bautista	Drax	Hindi	English	2022	2022	
Lyle, Lyle, Crocodile	Javier Bardem	Hector P. Valenti	Hindi	English	2022	2022	The songs by this character were dubbed by Abbey Fizardo.
Guardians of the Galaxy Vol. 3	Dave Bautista	Drax	Hindi	English	2023	2023	
Mission: Impossible – Dead Reckoning Part One	Marcin Dorociński	Captain of Sevastapol	Hindi	English	2023	2023	
Argylle	John Cena	Wyatt	Hindi	English	2024	2024	
The Fall Guy	Ben Knight	Dressler	Hindi	English	2024	2024	
Mission: Impossible – The Final Reckoning	Holt McCallany	Serling Bernstein	Hindi	English	2025	2025	His name is not mentioned in the dubbing credits.
Jurassic World: Rebirth	Manuel Garcia-Rulfo	Reuben	Hindi	English	2025	2025	
Nobody 2	Bob Odenkirk	Hutch Mansell	Hindi	English	2025	2025	The Hindi dub was direct to Prime Video Rental.
Days of Thunder	Michael Rooker	Rowdy Burns	Hindi	English	1994		Was dubbed into Hindi for a later release.

==== Bollywood films ====
Film title	Actor	Character	Dub language	Original language	Original Year release	Dub Year release	Notes
Calcutta Mail	Ali	A taxi driver	Hindi	Hindi	2003		
Gunjan Saxena: The Kargil Girl	Manav Vij	Gautam Sinha	English	Hindi	2020	2020	An Indian Hindi-language original film for Netflix dubbed into English.

==== South Indian films ====
All were released without their Hindi dubbed soundtrack albums except I.

Film title	Actor	Character	Dub language	Original language	Original Year release	Dub Year release	Notes
Pokiri	Ashish Vidyarthi	Sub-inspector Pasupathy	Hindi	Telugu	2006	2010	The Hindi dub was titled: Tapori Wanted.
King	Srihari †	Gnaneshwar Bhai	Hindi	Telugu	2008	2010	The Hindi dub was titled: King No. 1.
Gabbar Singh	Vellanki Nagineedu	Nagineedu Naidu, Venkatratnam aka Gabbar Singh's stepfather	Bhojpuri	Telugu	2012	2020	The Bhojpuri dub was titled: Daroga Raja.
Gabbar Singh	Kota Srinivasa Rao	Bhagyalakshmi's father	Bhojpuri	Telugu	2012	2020	The Bhojpuri dub was titled: Daroga Raja.
I	M. Kamaraj	'Pattinapakkam' Ravi	Hindi	Tamil	2015	2015	
Bruce Lee: The Fighter	Sivasankara Prasad 'Chiranjeevi' Konidela	Himself	Hindi	Telugu	2015	2016	
Vedalam	Ajith Kumar	Ganesh a.k.a. 'Vedalam' Ganesh	Hindi	Tamil	2015	2016	Performed alongside Urvi Ashar who voiced Shruti Haasan as Swetha and Aranya Kaur who voiced Lakshmi Menon as Tamizh (Trisha in Hindi version) in Hindi.
Katamarayudu	Tarun Arora	Bhanu	Hindi	Telugu	2017	2017	
Anjaan	Chetan Hansraj	Manoj	Hindi	Tamil	2014	2016	The Hindi dub was titled: Khatarnak Khiladi 2.
Yennai Arindhaal	Ajith Kumar	DCP Satyadev IPS	Hindi	Tamil	2015	2016	The Hindi dub was titled: Satyadev: The Fearless Cop.
Sarrainodu	Pudipeddi Sai Kumar	Jaya Prakash a.k.a. J.P.	Hindi	Telugu	2016	2017	
Thani Oruvan	Arvind Swamy	Siddharth Abhimanyu	Hindi	Tamil	2015	2017	The Hindi dub was titled: Double Attack 2.
Janatha Garage	Rahman	Shiva (Hari in Hindi version)	Hindi	Telugu	2016	2017	The Hindi dub was titled: Janta Garage.
Bairavaa	Jagapathi Babu	Periya Kannu (Praveen Kumar in Hindi version)	Hindi	Tamil	2017	2017	The Hindi dub was titled: Bhairava.
Dynamite	Raja Ravindra	Guna (Jagga in Hindi version)	Hindi	Telugu	2015	2017	
Khaidi No. 150	Tarun Arora	Aggarwal	Hindi	Telugu	2017	2017	
Duvvada Jagannadham	Prabhakar	Suri	Hindi	Telugu	2017	2017	The Hindi dub was titled: DJ.
Duvvada Jagannadham	Unknown actor	A corrupt officer working for Royalla Naidu (Royal Naidu in Hindi version)	Hindi	Telugu	2017	2017	The Hindi dub was titled: DJ.
Duvvada Jagannadham	Unknown actor	Police Commissioner (cameo)	Hindi	Telugu	2017	2017	The Hindi dub was titled: DJ.
Jaya Janaki Nayaka	Tarun Arora	Arjun Pawar	Hindi	Telugu	2017	2018	The Hindi dub was titled: Jaya Janaki Nayaka - Khoonkhar.
Doosukeltha	Prabhakar	Badhram (Bajrang in Hindi version)	Hindi	Telugu	2013	2017	The Hindi dub was titled: Dangerous Khiladi 6.
Luckunnodu	M. V. V. Satyanarayana	JK	Hindi	Telugu	2017	2018	The Hindi dub was titled: Sabse Bada Zero.
Hebbuli	Ravi Kishan	Amruth Shah	Hindi	Kannada	2017	2018	
Sketch	Baburaj	'Royapuram' Kumar ('Rowdy Reddy' Kumar in Hindi version)	Hindi	Tamil	2018	2018	
Ko	Bose Venkat	Kadhir	Hindi	Tamil	2011	2018	The Hindi dub was titled: The Real Leader.
Yuddham Sharanam	Madhusudhan Rao	Venkat Rao	Hindi	Telugu	2017	2018	
Guru	Zakir Hussain	Dev Khatri	Hindi	Telugu	2017	2018	
Agnyaathavaasi	Sampath Raj	Sampath	Hindi	Telugu	2018	2018	The Hindi dub was titled: Yevadu 3.
Eedo Rakam Aado Rakam	Supreeth Reddy	Gaja	Hindi	Telugu	2017	2018	The Hindi dub was titled: Hyper.
Thikka	Anand	Madan Mohan	Hindi	Telugu	2016	2018	The Hindi dub was titled: Rocket Raja.
Bharat Ane Nenu	Pudipeddi Ravi Shankar	Damu	Hindi	Telugu	2018	2018	The Hindi dub was titled: Dashing CM Bharath. This refers to the Hindi dub released on YouTube but has now been deleted. Someone else dubbed P. Ravi Shankar in the theatrical version.
Pandaga Chesko	Abhimanyu Singh	Shankar	Hindi	Telugu	2015	2017	The Hindi dub was titled: Businessman 2.
Dear Comrade	Raj Arjun	Ramesh Rao	Hindi	Telugu	2019	2020	
Naa Alludu	Charan Raj (voice in original version dubbed by Pudipeddi Ravi Shankar)	Jayaraj	Hindi	Telugu	2005	2021	The Hindi dub was titled: Main Hoon Gambler.
ABCD: American Born Confused Desi	Nagendra Babu	Aravind's father	Hindi	Telugu	2019	2021	
Vasu	Vijayakumar	Commissioner Rao, Vasu's father	Hindi	Telugu	2002	2007	The Hindi dub was titled Cheetah - The Leopard
Raghavendra	Anandaraj	Ankineedu (Anthony in Hindi version)	Hindi	Telugu	2003	2008	The Hindi dub was titled Sanyasi - The Warrior Saint
Vedalam	Ajith Kumar	Ganesh a.k.a. 'Vedalam'	Bhojpuri	Tamil	2015	Unknown	
Lucifer	Suresh Chandra Menon	Abdul	Hindi	Malayalam	2019	2019	
Rebel	Pradeep Rawat	Simhadri (Siraj in Bhojpuri version)	Bhojpuri	Telugu	2012	2019	The Bhojpuri dub was titled: Baaghi Saiyaan
Aruvi	Mohammad Ali Baig	DGP Mohammad Shakeel Waqaab	Hindi	Tamil	2016	2020	
Carry on Jatta 2	Jaswinder Bhalla	Advocate Dhillon	Hindi	Punjabi	2018	2020	The Hindi dub was titled: Carry on Balle Balle
Leo	Sanjay Dutt	Antony Das	English	Tamil	2023	2023	Netflix.
Kalki 2898 AD	Pasupathy	Veeran	Hindi	Telugu	2024	2024	
Good Bad Ugly	Pradeep Kabra	Mastaan Bhai's associate Gangster	Hindi	Tamil	2025	2025	
Good Bad Ugly	Darkkey Nagaraja	Puli Puli	Hindi	Tamil	2025	2025	

=== Animated films ===
Film title	Original voice(s)	Character(s)	Dub language	Original language	Original Year Release	Dub Year Release	Notes
The Batman vs. Dracula	Peter Stormare	Count Dracula	Hindi	English	2005		
The Angry Birds Movie	Danny McBride	Bomb	Hindi	English	2016		
The Angry Birds Movie 2	Danny McBride	Bomb	Hindi	English	2019		
The Boss Baby	Alec Baldwin	Theodore "Ted" Lindsey Templeton / Boss Baby	Hindi	English	2017 |		
The Boss Baby 2: Family Business	Alec Baldwin	Ted Templeton Jr. / The Boss Baby	Hindi	English	2021	2021	
Spider-Man: Across the Spider-Verse	Oscar Isaac	Miguel O'Hara / Spider-Man 2099	Punjabi	English	2023	2023	Archit Maurya dubbed this character in the Hindi dub.

== See also ==
- List of Indian Dubbing Artists
- Samay Raj Thakkar - Another Hindi voiceover artist for Arnold Schwarzenegger.
