= Pavel (film director) =

Bengali director

- Born: Pavel
- Occupation: Film director
- Years active: 2015–present
- Notable work: Rosogolla; Asur

Pavel is an Indian film director and screenplay writer who primarily works in Bengali-language films. He made his debut with the film Babar Naam Gandhiji, which was followed by Rosogolla. His next film, Asur, was released on 3 January 2020, with Jeet, Abir Chatterjee and Nusrat Jahan.

== Filmography ==
- Note: all films are in Bengali, unless otherwise noted.

Year	Film	Director	Story	Screenplay	Notes	Ref
2015	Bawal	No	Yes	Yes		
2015	Babar Naam Gandhiji	Yes	Yes	Yes		
2018	Shonar Pahar	No	Yes	Yes		
2018	Rosogolla	Yes	Yes	Yes		
2019	Baccha Shoshur	No	Yes	Yes		
2019	Bala	No	Yes	No	Hindi film	
2020	Asur	Yes	Yes	Yes		
2022	Kolkata Chalantika	Yes	Yes	Yes		
2026	Doctor Kaku	Yes				
2027	Mon Kharap	Yes	Yes	Yes		
