= Sayani Ghosh =

Indian swimmer

Personal information
- Full name: Sayani Ghosh
- Nationality: Indian
- Born: 13 January 1999 (age 27) Bally, West Bengal, India

Sport
- Sport: Swimming
- Strokes: Individual medley, Breaststroke
- Club: East Bengal Club
Medal record
Women's swimming
Representing India
South Asian Games
Gold medal – first place	2016 Guwahati	400 m individual medley

Sayani Ghosh (born 13 January 1999) is an Indian competitive swimmer. She won a gold medal in the 400-metre individual medley at the 2016 South Asian Games. Her primary disciplines are the individual medley and breaststroke.

== Early life ==
She was born in Bally, Howrah, West Bengal. She began competitive swimming in 2005. Her early career was reportedly supported by the East Bengal Club following financial constraints faced by her family.

== Career ==
=== National competitions ===
Ghosh competed in the Senior National Aquatic Championships representing West Bengal. At the 2016 edition held in Ranchi, she won the gold medal in the 200-metre individual medley with a time of 2:32.55. In the 200-metre breaststroke at the same event, she recorded a time of 2:45.09, finishing in second place.

She competed in the 400-metre individual medley at the 2024 Khelo India Youth Games and won a bronze medal.

=== International competitions ===
In February 2016, Ghosh was selected for the Indian squad at the 12th South Asian Games in Guwahati. She won the gold medal in the 400-metre individual medley, recording a time of 5:14.51. In 2017, she represented India at the 17th FINA World Championships in Budapest, Hungary, competing in the 50m butterfly, where she finished 51st in the heats with a time of 33.41, and in the 200m individual medley, finishing 36th in the heats with a time of 2:32.55.
