= Ghatotkacha =

Son of Bhima in the Hindu epic Mahabharata

- Mahabharata character
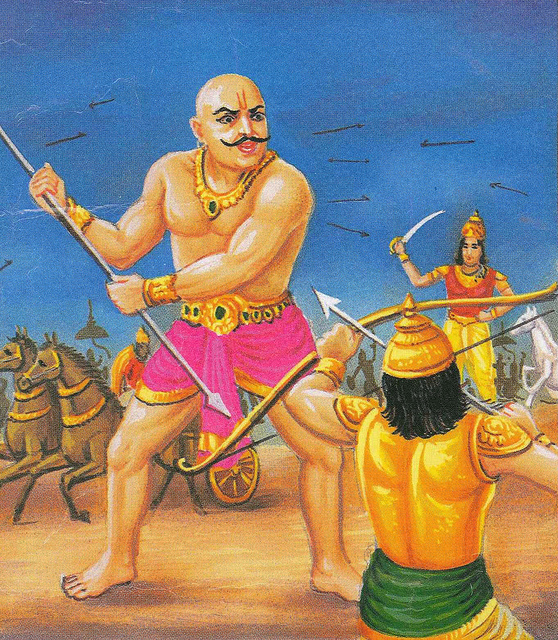
- Karna and Ghatotkacha engaged in war

In-universe information
- Weapon: Gada (mace)
- Family: Bhima (father); Hidimbi (mother)
- Spouse: Ahilawati (in folk traditions)
- Children: Anjanaparva; Meghavarna; Barbarika (in folk traditions)
- Home: Kamyaka Forest

Ghatotkacha (Sanskrit: घटोत्कच, IAST: Ghaṭotkaca; lit. 'Bald Pot') is a character in the ancient Indian epic Mahabharata. His name comes from the fact that he was bald (utkacha) and his head was shaped like a ghatam, or a pot. He is the son of the Pandava Bhima and the rakshasi Hidimbi.

As the head of one akshauhini army, he was an important fighter from the Pandava side in the Kurukshetra War and caused a great deal of destruction to the Kaurava army. Ghatotkacha killed many demons like Alambusha, Alayudha, and many gigantic asuras. He was specifically called out as the warrior who forced Karna to use his vasavi shakti weapon, and courted a hero’s death in the great war.

== Biography ==
=== Name ===
His name refers to his round bald head; ghata means 'pot' and utkacha means 'head' in Sanskrit.

=== Birth and early life ===
On the burning of the Lakshagriha, the Pandavas escape through a tunnel and reach a forest. While they were sleeping, the rakshasa chief Hidimba in the forest sees the Pandavas from the top of a tree, and he appoints his sister Hidimbi to bring them to him for food. Hidimbi goes to the Pandavas in the guise of a beautiful woman. She is attracted to Bhima and prays for the reciprocity of her love. She alerts the Pandavas to her brother's demands, pleading with them to leave the forest; however, Bhima refuses. Impatient at the delay, Hidimba runs towards the Pandavas but is slain by Bhima. Hidimbi then approaches Kunti and requests Bhima's hand in marriage. The Pandavas and Kunti agree to the proposal on the condition that once a child is born to Hidimbi, they'd have to continue their peregrinations. Later, Ghatotkacha is born to Hidimbi and Bhima. Indra bestows on Ghaṭotkacha prowess enough to be a suitable opponent to Karna. Ghatotkacha grows up under the care of Hidimbi.

Ghatotkacha's wife was Ahilawati. According to the Mahabharata, Ghatotkacha has two sons Anjanaparva—who is killed during the Kurukshetra War by the warrior Ashvatthama—and Meghavarna—who survives the war and participates in the ashvamedha of the Pandavas. Some accounts note a third son, Barbarika.

=== Interactions with Bhima ===
During their exile the pandavas were too tired to walk further, then Bhima remembers Ghatotkacha, who immediately appeared before the Pandavas, and also brought down many demons at the behest of Bhima. Ghatotkacha carrying Draupadi on his shoulders, and the rakshasas carrying Pandava brothers on their shoulders went by air to Badrikashrama, where Nara-Narayana were meditating, landed them there, and then he (Ghatotkacha and his companions) bid farewell to the Pandavas.

Ghatotkacha is considered a loyal and humble figure. He and his followers were available to his father Bhima at any time; all Bhima had to do was to think of him, and he would appear. Like his father, Ghatotkacha primarily fought with the mace.

=== Kurukshetra War ===
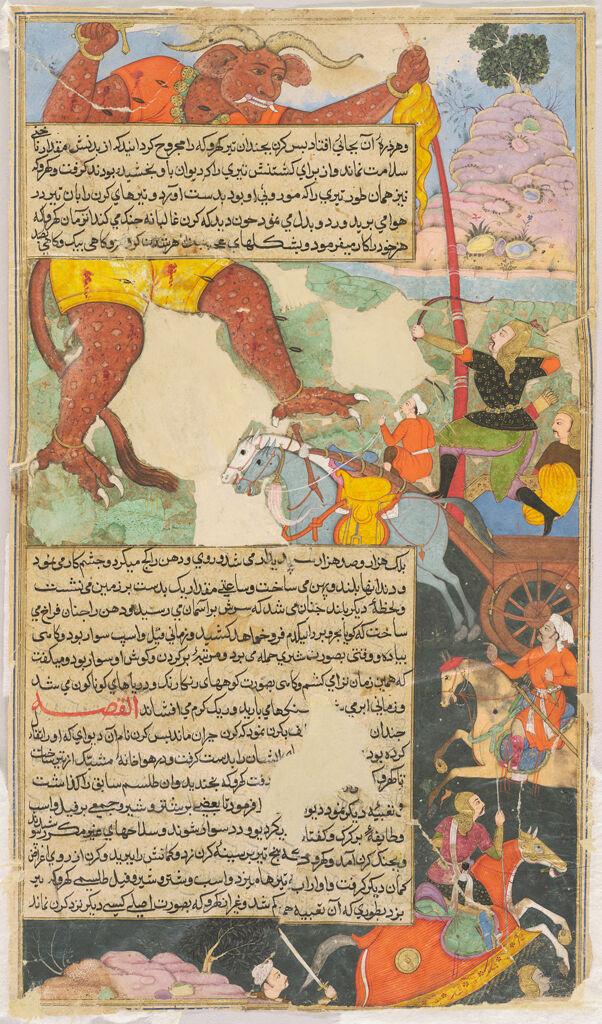
Karna Attacks Ghatotkacha (text, recto; painting, verso), folio from a Razmnama (Book of War) series

In the Kurukshetra War, Ghatotkacha is summoned by Bhima to fight on the Pandava side. In the battle of the first day he fought against Alambusha, Duryodhana, and Bhagadatta. Terrified of the terrible course of the battle, the Kauravas deliberately postponed the battle for that day. On the 8th day of battle, Ghatotkacha has a prolonged clash with Alambusha, and though he manages to severely wound the other demon, he is unable to prevent his retreat.

The 14th day of battle features Ghatotkacha in a major role. During the morning battle, he becomes enraged when his mighty son Anjanparva is killed by Ashwatthama. Invoking his magical powers, he brings great havoc to the Kaurava army using his power of illusion, even scaring away great warriors like Drona, Duryodhana, Karna and Dushasana. Ashwatthama attempts to rally fleeing soldiers, dispelling Ghatotkacha's illusion and managing to knock the demon unconscious. After coming to his senses, Ghatotkacha fights with Ashwatthama in a long duel. During the fight, both combatants use their magical powers and celestial weapons, though Ashwatthama manages to hold his ground and forces Ghatotkacha to withdraw.

After the death of Jayadratha on Day 14, with the battle continuing past sunset, Ghatotkacha truly shines; his powers were at their most effective at night as demons' abilities are heightened. Along with his troops, Ghatotkacha kills Alayudha and Alambusha, smashing the latter's head with a mace. With Ghatotkacha on a rampage, another fight took place between Ashwatthama and Ghatotkacha. Ashwatthama manages to defeat Ghatotkacha multiple times, but the powerful demon manages to escape using his illusions. On the other hand Karna also defeats Ghatotkacha twice on the battlefield after some tough battles but yet is unable to prevent Ghatotkacha from wreaking havoc on the Kaurava army. As the army breaks around him, with even Duryodhana forced to flee with his flag in tatters, Karna uses Vasavi Śhakti as a last resort to ultimately kill the powerful demon. This weapon had been bestowed by Indra and could only be used once; Karna had been keeping it in reserve to use against Arjuna.

Though mortally wounded by the weapon vasavi shakti, Ghatotkacha rises to the sky and manages to enlarge his body, crushing one akshauhini of the Kaurava army. The Pandavas were filled with grief at Ghatotkacha's death. Krishna, however, could not help but smile, knowing that Ghatotkacha has saved Arjuna from Karna.

== Folklores ==
=== Hidimbi's sacrifice request ===
According to non canonic folktales, years later, one day Hidimbi asks Ghatotkacha to fetch a human to sacrifice to Kali. On his way to do so, he spots a Brahmin and his wife traveling with their three children. Ghatotkacha approaches them and requests one of them to come with him to be his mother's sacrifice to the goddess.

The Brahmin offers himself, but his wife insists that she would go. Finally, their second son agrees to go with Ghatotkacha but asks to first bathe in the river Ganga. Bhima, living in exile in the forest with his brothers, comes across the scene. Upon discovering the pending sacrifice, he steps in to take the child's place. Ghatotkacha returns to his mother with Bhima in tow, only to become shocked when she tells him that Bhima is his father. Scolded by Bhima, both Ghatotkacha and Hidimbi agree to end the practice of human sacrifice.

=== Barbarika ===
Barbarika, though not in any of the official renditions of the Mahabharata, appears as one of Ghatokacha's son in a some folklore.

=== Indonesian version ===
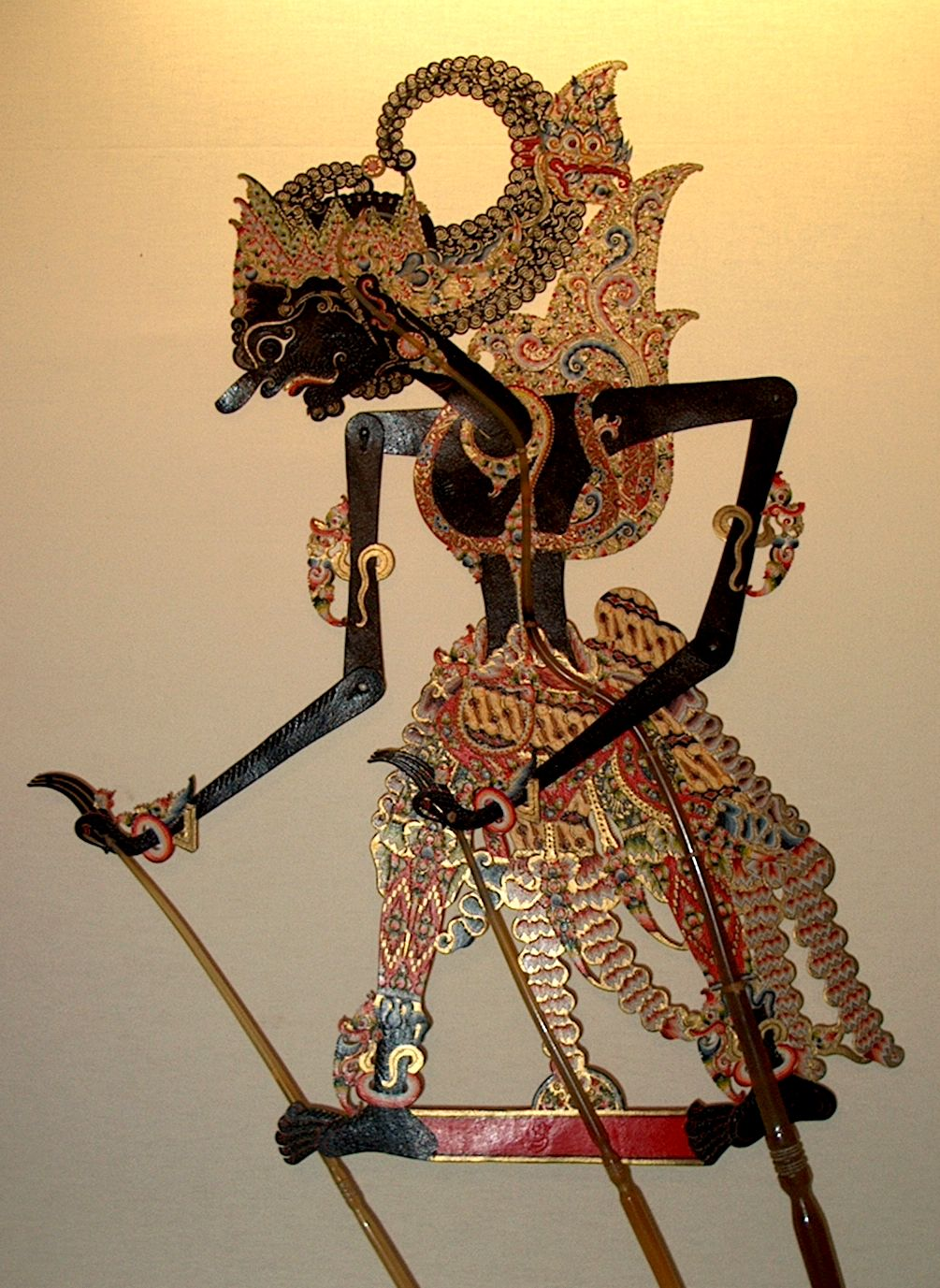
Ghatotkacha as Javanese Wayang puppet in war attire

The Kurukshetra War in Javanese and also Balinese wayang is usually called by the name Bharatayuddha. The story was adapted and developed from the script Kakawin Bharatayuddha written in 1157 during the time of the Kediri Kingdom (present day East Java, Indonesia). In the wayang puppet version, Ghatotkacha (locally spelled 'Gatotkaca') is very close to his cousin named Abhimanyu, son of Arjuna. Abhimanyu married Uttara the daughter of Virata Kingdom, after he claimed he was a virgin. In fact, Abhimanyu was married to Sitisundari, daughter of Krishna. Sitisundari who is entrusted in the palace of Ghatotkacha heard the news that her husband had remarried. Ghatotkacha's Uncle, named Kalabendana, came to Abhimanyu to take him home (Kalabendana was Arimbi's youngest brother,, a dwarf giant but with a plain and noble heart). This had made Uttara jealous, and Abhimanyu was forced to swear that if he indeed had a wife other than Uttara, he would be willing to die beaten by his enemies later on. Kalabendana met with Ghatotkacha to report Abhimanyu's attitude. Ghatotkacha actually scolded Kalabendana, which he considered presumptuously interfering in his cousin's household affairs. Out of an impulse of anger, Ghatotkacha hit Kalabendana's head, and even though the act was carried out accidentally, Kalabendana was killed instantly.

When the Bharatayuddha war broke out, Abhimanyu was killed by the Kauravas on the 13th day. On the 14th day, Arjuna managed to avenge his son's death by beheading Jayadratha. Duryodhana was very sad over the death of Jayadratha, his own brother-in-law. He forced Karna to attack the Pandava camp that night. Karna obeyed even though this violates the rules of the war. After learning that the Kauravas launched a night attack, the Pandavas sent Ghatotkacha to head off. Ghatotkacha was deliberately chosen because Kotang Antrakusuma armor which he wears is able to emit bright light to shine on Kaurava's army. Ghatotkacha successfully killed a Kaurava ally named Lembusa. Meanwhile, two of his uncles, Brajalamadan and Brajawikalpa, died at the hands of their enemies, each named Lembusura and Lembusana.

Ghatotkacha faced Karna, the wielder of Kontawijaya weapon. He created his twins as many as a thousand people to make Karna feel confused. On the instructions of his father, named Surya, Karna managed to find the original Ghatotkacha. He then released Konta weapon in the direction of Ghatotkacha. Ghatotkacha tried to evade this by flying as high as possible. But the spirit of Kalabendana suddenly appeared to catch Kontawijaya while delivering news from heaven that the death of Ghatotkacha had been set that night. Ghatotkacha surrenders himself to his fate and requests that his body would be used to kill Kaurava's armies. Kalabendana agrees, then stabbed Ghatotkacha's navel using Konta weapon. The weapon merges back into its sheath, which is the mastaba wood still stored in Ghatotkacha's gut. Ghatotkacha dies, and the spirit of Kalabendana threw his body towards Karna who managed to jump to escape death. Karna's chariot was shattered to pieces as a result of being crushed by Ghatotkacha's body, and the fragments of the chariot shot in all directions and killed the Kaurava soldiers who were around it.

== Temples ==
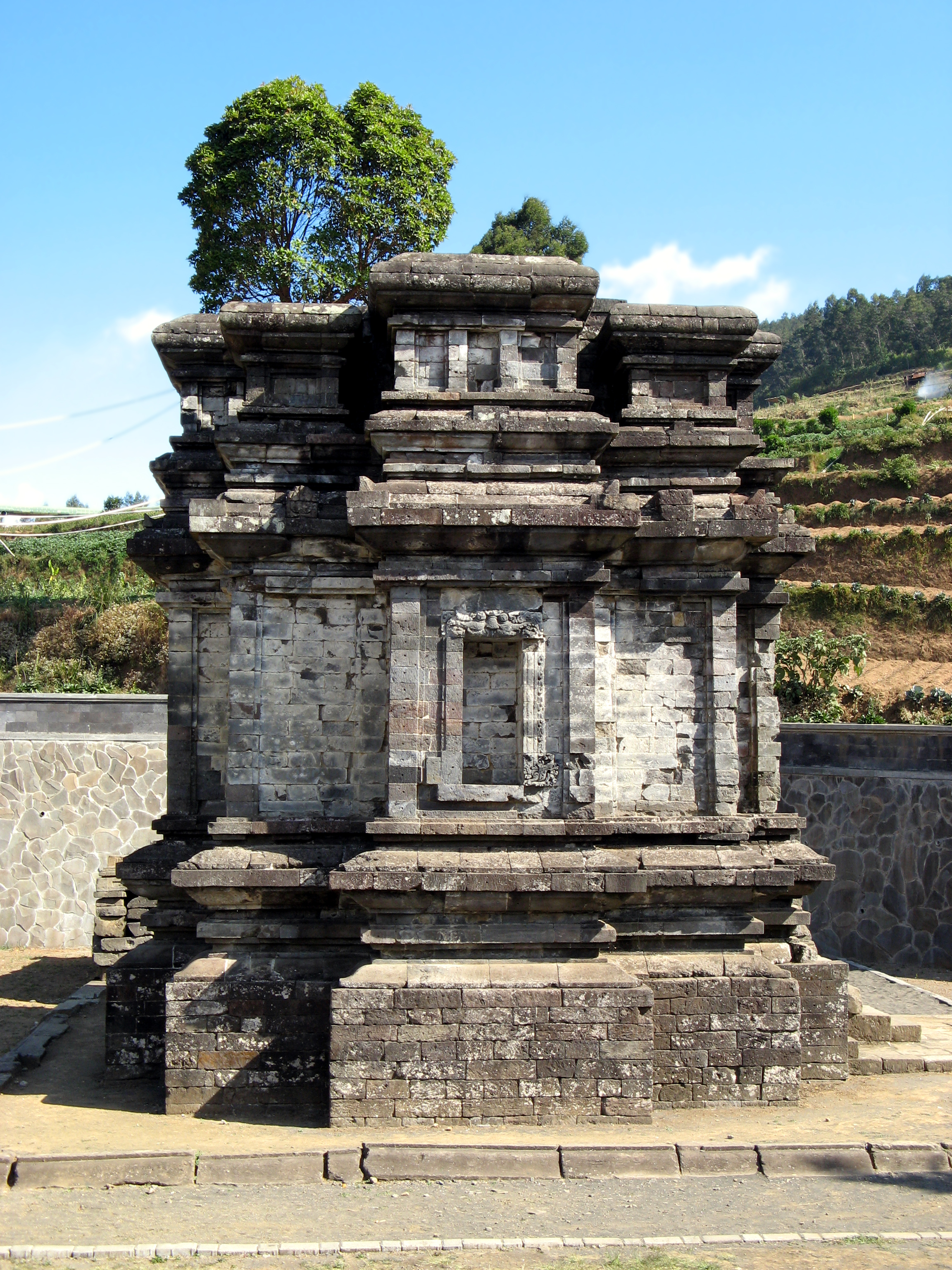
Gatotkaca temple in Central Java, Indonesia

- There is a temple built in Champawat, Uttrakhand where it is meant his head fell after he was killed by Karna in the battle of Mahabharata.
- There is a temple built to honor Ghatotkacha in Manali, Himachal Pradesh near the Hidimba Devi Temple.
- An ancient 7th Century Hindu temple structure in Dieng Temples complex, Central Java is named as "Ghatotkacha Temple" in honour of the Mahabharata character.

== In popular culture ==
- The folktale of Sasirekha Parinayam (not originally in the Mahabharata) about Abhimanyu's love for Shashirekha/Vatsala (the daughter of Balarama) and Ghatotkacha's help in breaking off Vatsala's engagement with Lakshmana Kumara has been filmed numerous times in India. These include:
  - Surekha Haran, a 1921 Indian silent film directed by Baburao Painter.
  - Vatsalaharan, a 1923 Indian silent film directed by Baburao Painter.
  - Maya Bazaar, a 1925 Indian silent film directed by Baburao Painter.
  - Maya Bazaar, a 1932 Indian Hindi film starring Baburao Pendharkar.
  - Maya Bazaar, a 1935 Indian Tamil film directed by R. Padmanabhan.
  - Mayabazar, or Sasirekha Parinayam, a 1936 Indian Telugu-language fantasy film directed by P. V. Das.
  - Maya Bazaar, a 1939 Indian film directed by G. P. Pawar.
  - Maya Bazaar, a 1949 Indian Hindi fantasy film directed by Datta Dharmadhikari.
  - Mayabazar, a 1957 Indian epic fantasy film directed by K. V. Reddy.
  - Maya Bazaar, a 1958 Indian Hindi adventure fantasy film directed by Babubhai Mistry.
  - Maya Bazar, a 1984 Indian Hindi/Gujarati fantasy film directed by Babubhai Mistry.
  - Maya Bazaar, a 1984 Indian Telugu romance drama film directed by Dasari Narayana Rao.
- Other Indian films about Ghatotkacha include:
  - Veer Ghatotkacha, a 1949 Indian Hindi/Marathi religious film.
  - Veer Ghatotkajan, a 1959 Indian Tamil film directed by Babubhai Mistry.
  - Ghatotkachudu, a 1995 Indian Telugu comedy film directed by S. V. Krishna Reddy.
  - Veer Ghatotkacha, a 1970 Indian Hindi adventure film directed by Shantilal Soni.
  - A 2008 Indian animated film Ghatothkach was based on his life. It was directed by Singeetham Srinivas Rao.
  - Ghatotkacha, another Indian animated film released in 2008, directed by Rakesh Prasad.
- Amar Chitra Katha, an Indian comic book series, published an issue on Ghatotkacha. This was later adapted as an episode in the 2010 animated series of the comics.
- Razaq Khan (Not comedian Rajaq Khan) played Ghatotkacha in 1988 TV Series Mahabharat.
- Ketan Karande played Ghatotkacha in 2013 TV Series Mahabharat.
- Since ancient until current modern Indonesia, Ghatotkacha has become a very popular pop culture figure and wayang puppet character, having its own version of stories told in the Javanese and Balinese version of Mahabharata story.
  - In Javanese wayang, he is known as Gatotkoco with superhero fame and well known for the nickname the "Satria otot kawat balung wesi" ("Wire muscle and Iron bone Warrior").
  - For Javanese and Balinese, Ghatotkacha is revered as a deity and popularly depicted in artworks and statues, such as the Satria Gatotkaca Park Statue in Kuta major road intersection in Bali.
  - Ghatotkacha has been frequently depicted in Indonesian popular culture, such as music, comics and film, such as the superhero action film Satria Dewa: Gatotkaca (2021).
  - Javanese version of Ghatotkacha, known as Gatotkaca, depicted in Garudayana, an Indonesian comic series, is featured as a playable character in the game Mobile Legends: Bang Bang.

== See also ==
- Ghatotkacha Caves
- Hanuman
- Mayabazar
- Kachari Kingdom
- List of characters in the Mahabharata
