= Hidimbi =

Demoness from the Indian epic Mahabharata

Hiḍimbī
- Mahabharata character
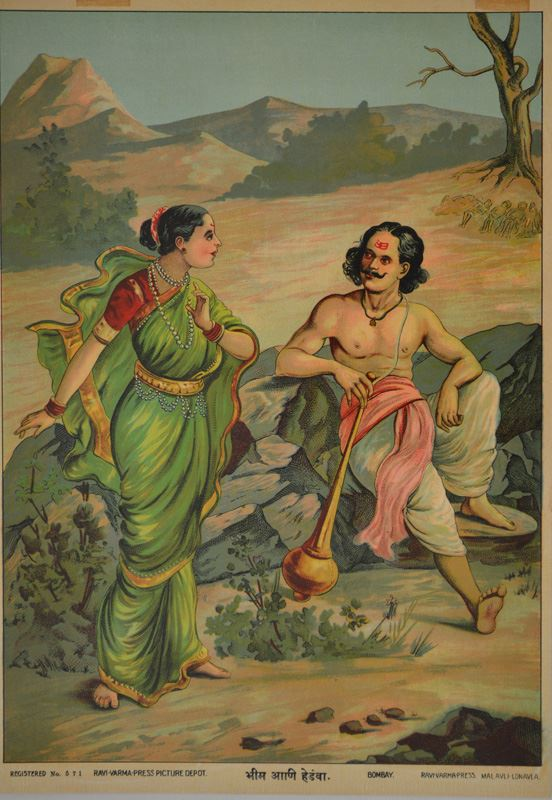
- Bheema and Hidimbi, 20th-century print by Ravi Varma Press

Information
- Race: Rakshasa
- Family: Hidimba (brother)
- Spouse: Bhima
- Children: Ghatotkacha (son)
- Relatives: Kunti (mother-in-law); The Pandavas (brothers-in-law)
- Home: Kamyaka Forest

Hiḍimbī, also known as Haḍimbā (Sanskrit: हिडिम्बा), is a character in the Mahabharata, one of the two great Sanskrit epics of ancient India. She is introduced as a man-eating Rakshasi (demoness) and the sister of Hidimba, a powerful demon who ruled a forested region. In the narrative, Hidimbi is tasked by her brother to deceive the Pandava brothers—the main characters of the epic—but instead falls in love with Bhima, second of the five Pandava brothers. She exposes the scheme, leading to Hidimba's death at the hands of Bhima. Afterwards, Hidimbi marries Bhima and becomes the mother of Ghatotkacha, who plays an important role in the Kurukshetra War. In contemporary times, Hidimbi is identified with a guardian goddess named Haḍimbā, locally worshipped in the Himalayan region.

== Legend ==
Hidimbi is introduced in the Mahabharata in the Hidimba-Vadha Parva episode of the Adi Parva (First book of the epic). Hidimbi is depicted as a formidable rākṣasī (demoness) who resided in the forest alongside her brother, Hidimba, a cannibal. The siblings make their home in a towering Sala tree and prey on travelers who pass through their territory. One day, while searching for food, Hidimba senses the presence of humans nearby—the Pandavas and their mother, Kunti, who are wandering in exile after narrowly escaping the fiery trap set for them by the Kauravas in the House of Lacquer. Eager for fresh prey, Hidimba orders his sister to investigate and lure them into a trap. As she moves through the forest, Hidimbi discovers the group sleeping under the watch of Bhima, the second eldest brother, and a powerful and strikingly handsome warrior. Instantly captivated, she decides he would be the perfect husband.

Aware that her monstrous form may frighten the warrior, Hidimbi transforms into a beautiful maiden and approaches Bhima. She warns him of her brother’s intentions and urges him to flee. She offers to carry him and his family away to safety with her supernatural abilities, but Bhima refuses to flee. Hidimba, realizing that his sister has betrayed him, becomes furious and calls her promiscuous. He storms toward them to kill them all. Bhima, however, steps forward to face him. The two engage in a fierce battle, while Hidimbi watches anxiously. In the end, Bhima overpowers Hidimba and kills him, freeing the forest from his menace.

The Pandavas and Kunti, continue their journey, followed closely by Hidimbi. Bhima, wary of her presence, warns her to leave, but Yudhishthira intervenes, reminding him that virtue is more important than suspicion. Hidimbi, deeply in love with Bhima, pleads with Kunti for acceptance, vowing to protect the Pandavas and remain loyal. The eldest brother Yudhishthira agrees to let Bhima be with her during the day, as long as he returns by nightfall. Hidimbi, taking on a beautiful form, carries Bhima to various beautiful Himalayan landscapes, where they spend time together. Eventually, she conceives and gives birth to Ghatotkacha, a powerful Rakshasa warrior who matures instantly, displaying extraordinary strength and combat skills. Devoted to the Pandavas, he quickly becomes a trusted ally. Once her time with Bhima ends, Hidimbi bids farewell and departs, leaving her son to stand by the Pandavas’ side.

== As a goddess ==
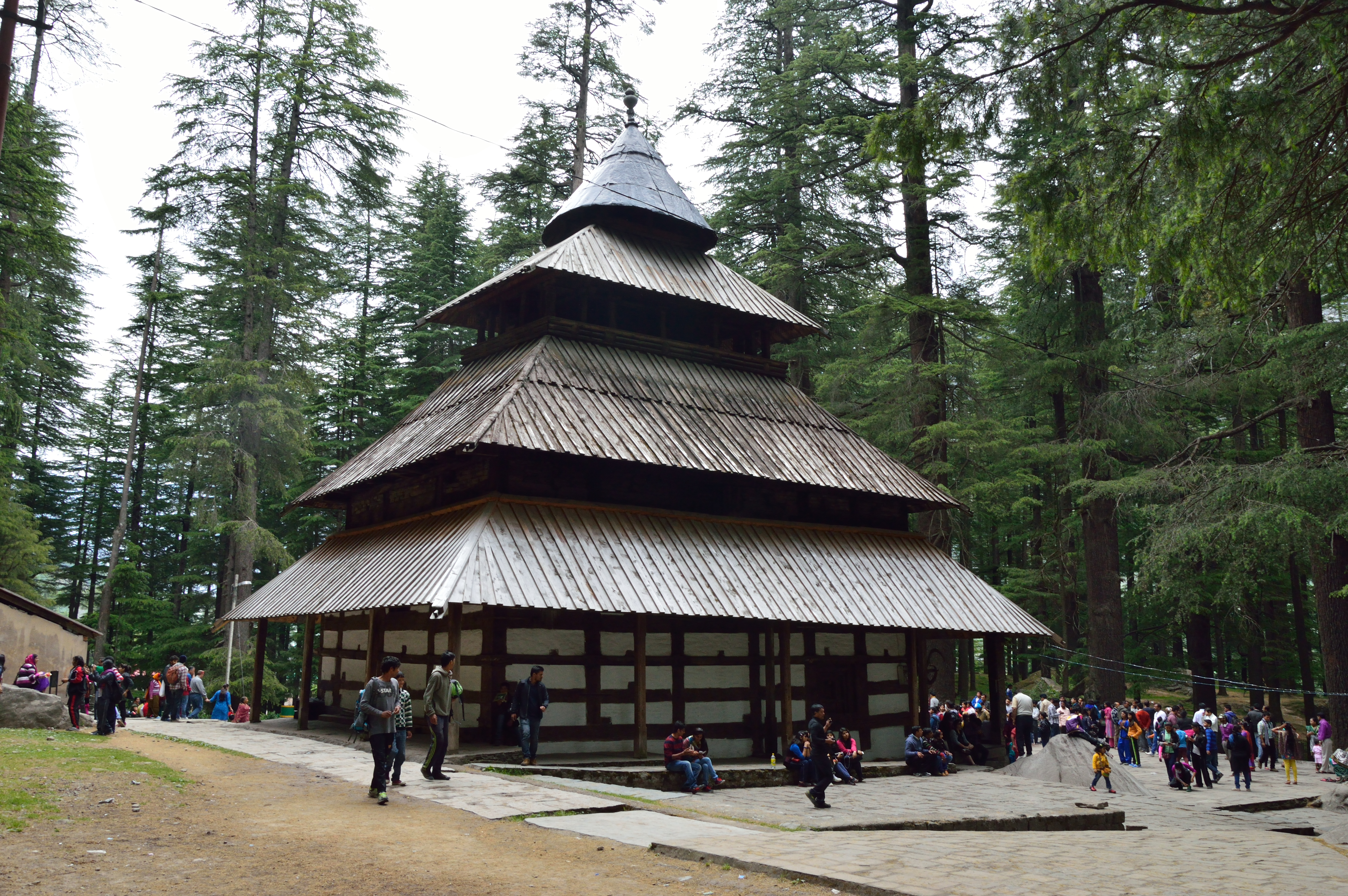
Haḍimbā Devī Temple in Manali, Himachal Pradesh

Hiḍimbī, the rakshasi from the Mahabharata, is widely identified with Haḍimbā, a local goddess worshipped in the Himachal Pradesh. In Himachali tradition, Haḍimbā is an independent deity with her own cult, including a temple in Manali, whose connection to the Mahabharata appears to have been emphasized only in recent history. Despite her current status as Hiḍimbī of the Mahabharata, Haḍimbā’s worship predates this association. The absence of Bhima from her rituals, the late identification of Ghatotkaca in her cult, and the lack of epic references in early records suggest that her Mahabharata connection was a later imposition.

Scholars have offered various theories to explain this transformation. M.N. Srinivas, Richard King, O.C. Handa argue that Haḍimbā was originally a local or even Buddhist Tantric goddess who was later absorbed into Hinduism and identified with Hiḍimbī due to linguistic and theological overlaps. Neeru Nanda suggests that the Bhim-Hiḍimbī episode mythologizes an ancient conflict between Aryan Devas and Himalayan Asuras. B.R. Sharma and Ashok Jerath propose that Haḍimbā was a historical tribal queen who was later deified. Vogel and Hutchison claim that colonial scholars reinforced her Mahabharata identity by prioritizing Sanskritic over oral traditions, while Mark Elmore highlights the role of tourism and state-sponsored heritage branding in popularizing her epic connection, especially after Himachal Pradesh’s formation in 1971 and the rise of television adaptations like B.R. Chopra’s Mahabharata.

== Gallery ==
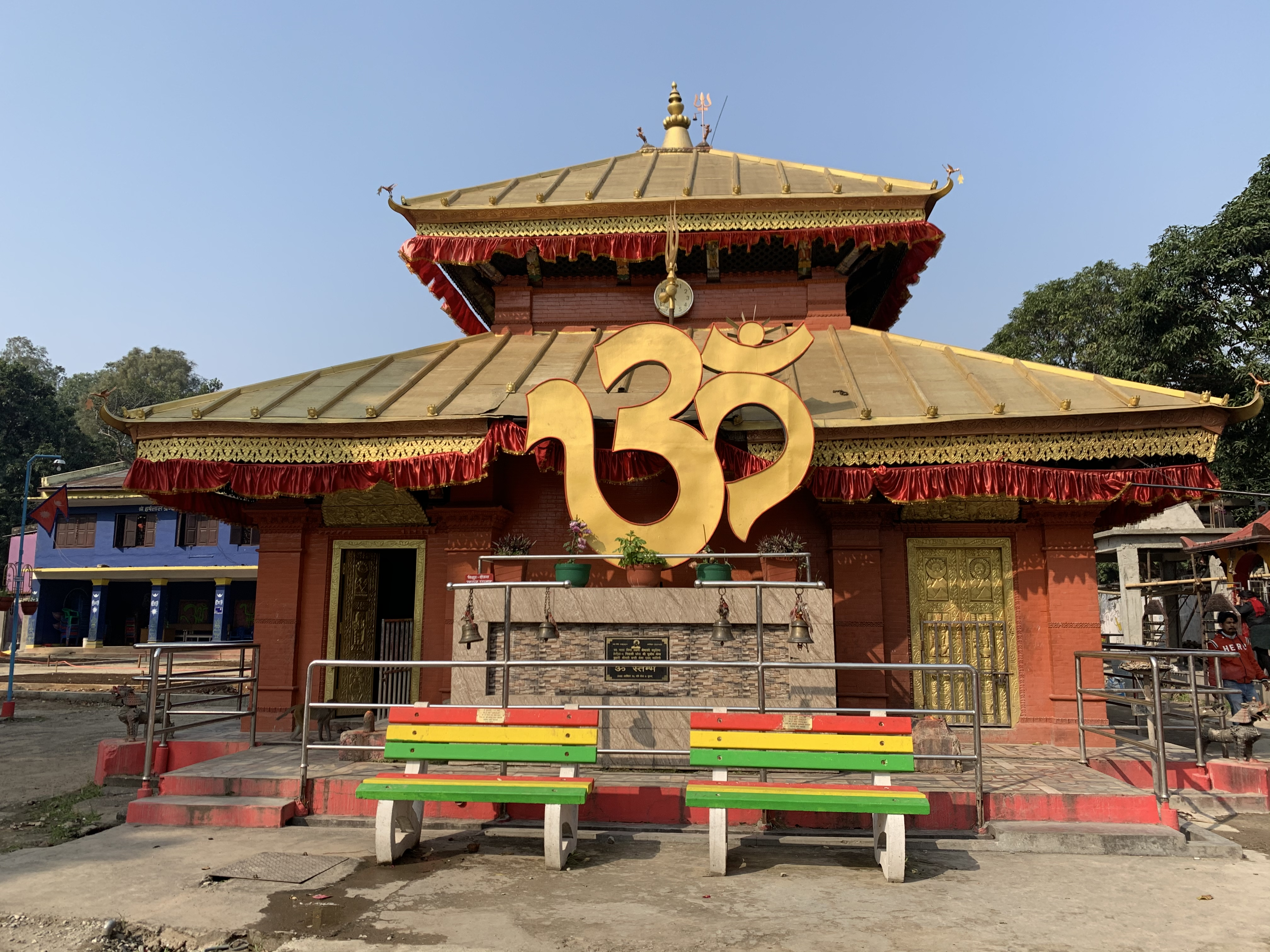
Bhutandevi temple, in Hetuada (Nepal)

== See also ==
- Hidimba Devi Temple
- Hidimba
- Kaleshwari Group of Monuments
