= Hidimba =

Demon from the Indian epic Mahābhārata

Hiḍimba
- Mahabharata character

Information
- Race: Rakshasa
- Gender: Male
- Family: Hidimbi (sister)
- Home: Kamyaka Forest

Hidimba (Sanskrit: हिडिम्ब, romanized: Hiḍimba) was a powerful demon king who is mentioned in the epic Mahābhārata. He was killed by Bhima and this is recounted in the 9th sub-parva (Hidimba-vadha Parva) of the Adi Parva.

== Death ==
The demon Hidimba lived in a forest along with his sister Hidimbi. While travelling, the Pandavas stopped in that forest to rest while Bhima stood on guard. Hidimba ate human flesh and became eager to devour them. He sent Hidimbi to kill the Pandavas and to bring them back to him. Hidimbi went on his instructions, but her mind changed on seeing Bhima. She assumed the form of a beautiful woman and told Bhima about her brother, whilst also requesting him to marry her.

Hidimba got furious at his sister and rushed towards her to kill her. Bhima interjected Hidimba and challenged him to fight him instead. The sleeping Pandavas woke up on hearing the sounds of them fighting and offered to help Bhima in killing Hidimba but Bhima asked them to watch the duel as spectators. Arjuna reminded Bhima that daybreak was about to set in and that demons become stronger at that time. So, he advised Bhima to kill Hidimba as soon as possible. Thereafter, Bhima ended up crushing and tearing Hidimba into two pieces.

== See also ==
- Hidimba Devi Temple
