= Bhagwan Das (disambiguation) =

Bhagwan Das (1869–1958) was an Indian Theosophist.

Bhagwan Das or Bhagwandas may also refer to:

- Bhagwan Das Garga (1924–2011), Indian documentary filmmaker and film historian
- Bhagwan Das KabirPanthi, Indian politician
- Bhagwan Das Gupta (1940–1998), Nepalese politician
- Bhagavan Das (yogi) (born 1945), American yogi
- Bhagwan Das Varma, Indian film producer, distributor and director
- Rana Bhagwandas (1942–2015), Pakistani judge
- Paul Bhagwandas (1950–1996), Indian-Surinamese military officer

== See also ==
- Bhagavan (disambiguation)
- Bhagwant Das (1527–1589), Raja of Amber
- Bhagwandas Patel (born 1943), Indian folklorist from Gujarat
- Bhagwandas Bagla, Indian-Burmese businessman
- Bhagwandas Mulchand Luthria (stage name Sudhir) (1944–2014), Bollywood actor
- Bhagwandas Sabnani, Indian politician
