= Bhagavan (disambiguation) =

Bhagavan is a term meaning the blessed or fortunate one in Hinduism.

Bhagavan (also spelt Bhagawan or Bhagwan) may also refer to:

- Svayam Bhagavan, a philosophical concept in monotheistic Vaisnava traditions

== People ==
- Bhagavan Antle, American wildlife enthusiast, trainer, and businessperson
- Bhagwan Dada (1913–2002), Indian actor and film director
- Bhagwan Das (disambiguation)
  - Bhagwan Das (1869–1958), Indian theosophist
  - Bhagavan Das (yogi) (born 1945), American yoga teacher
- Bhagwan Shree Rajneesh (1931–1990), also known as Osho, Indian mystic and spiritual teacher
- Dada Bhagwan (1908–1988), Indian spiritual leader
- Krishna Bhagavaan (born 1965), Indian actor
- Sri Bhagavan (born 1949), Indian spiritual master and founder of Oneness University
- S. K. Bhagavan, Indian filmmaker

== Films ==
- Bhagavan (1986 film), an Indian Malayalam-language film
- Bhagavan (2009 film), an Indian Malayalam-language film
- Bhagawan (2004 film), an Indian Kannada-language action film

== See also ==
- Bhagwant, an Indian male given name
