= Jolbhora Sandesh =

Traditional Bengali sweet

Chandannagar Jolbhora Sandesh
- Geographical indication
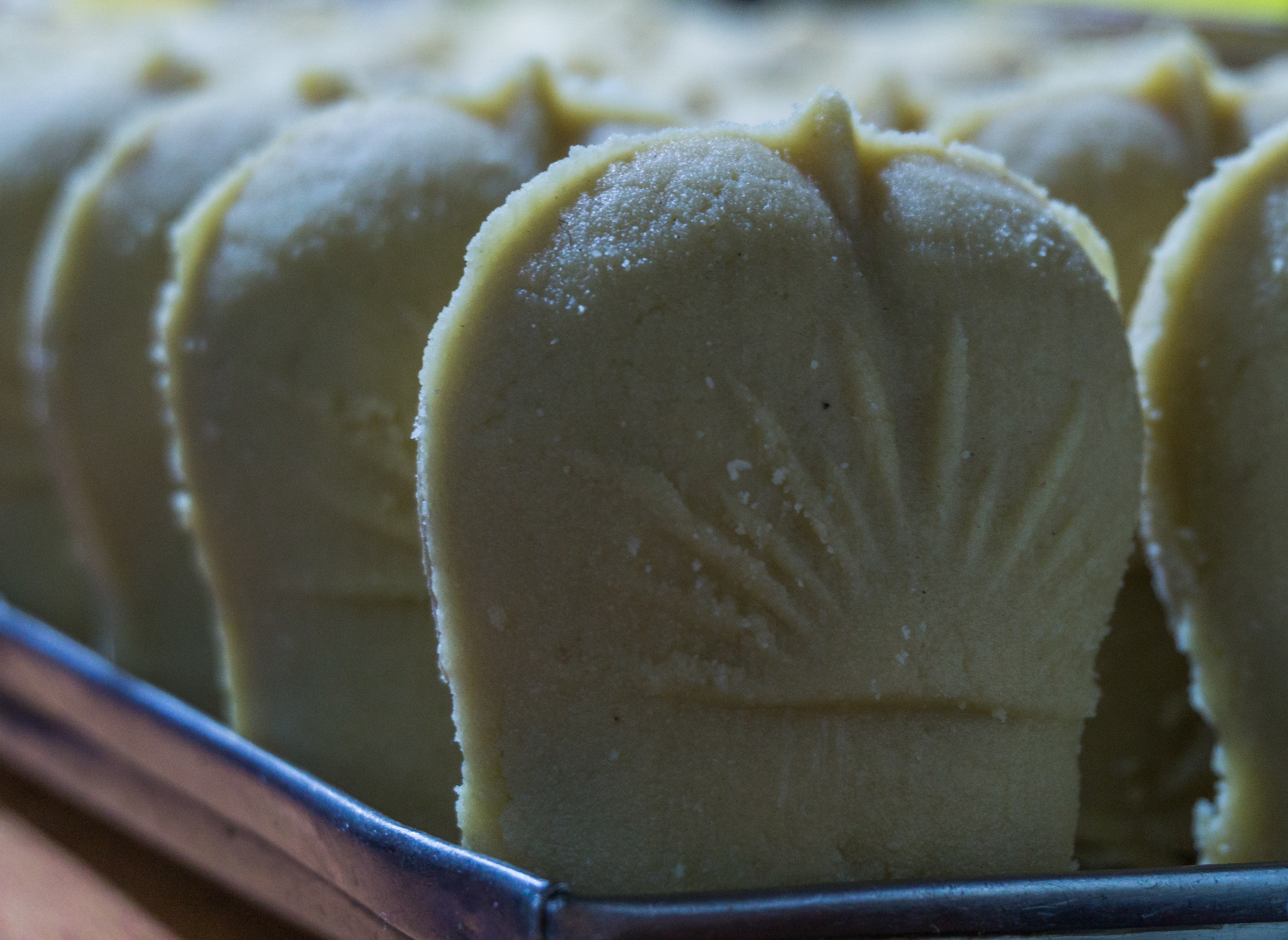
- Jolbhora Sandesh from Chandannagar
- Description: Chandannagar Jolbhora Sandesh is a type of sweet of West Bengal
- Type: Sweets of the Indian subcontinent
- Area: Chandannagar, West Bengal
- Country: India
- Registered: 26 June 2026
- Material: Chhena, date palm jaggery syrup

Jolbhora Sandesh (Bengali: জলভরা সন্দেশ) is a traditional Bengali sweet originating from Chandannagar in the Indian state of West Bengal. The name derives from two Bengali words: jol (জল), meaning "water" or "liquid," and bhora (ভরা), meaning "filled," referring to the liquid filling at the center of the sweet. A variant of sandesh, which is made from fresh chhena (curdled milk), Jolbhora Sandesh is typically filled with nolen gur (date palm jaggery syrup), especially during the winter months. It is in the shape of ice apple (talsash in bengali). Recently it got GI (Geographical Indicator of India) status.

== History ==
The use of chhena in Bengali sweets became widespread during the Portuguese colonization of Bandel, a town in the Hooghly district of West Bengal. The Portuguese introduced the use of curdled milk in confectionery, which influenced local sweet-makers (moiras). Moiras from Chandannagar, then a French colony, adopted and refined the technique. Among them was Surya Kumar Modak, who later established a sweet shop in Bhadreswar that became renowned for producing Jolbhora sandesh.

== Origin ==
According to local accounts, Surya Kumar Modak created the first jolbhora sandesh by modifying a popular dry sweet known as talsansh. He inserted a small amount of liquid nolen gur into the center of the sweet, resulting in a confection that released syrup upon biting. The innovative sweet was named jolbhora—literally "water-filled." Traditionally, the sweet measures approximately 4–5 cm in length, 5–6 cm in height, and 2–2.5 cm in width.

== In local folklore ==
A popular story associated with the sweet suggests that it was first created for a festive occasion at the Zamindar estate of Telinipara. Modak was commissioned to design a sweet that would humorously surprise a newly married son-in-law during a family gathering. He crafted a sweet shaped like a palm fruit or ice apple (Talsash in bengali) and filled it with liquid jaggery. Upon biting, the syrup-filled center surprised the groom, and the sweet came to be known as Jolbhora Talsash Sandesh.

== Ingredients and process ==
The primary ingredient of Jolbhora Sandesh is fresh chhena, which is kneaded into a smooth paste. This is mixed with grated patali gur (solid date palm jaggery) and powdered sugar. The mixture is cooked gently over low heat with a small quantity of ghee until it forms a pliable dough. The dough is shaped into individual sweets, each with a small cavity that is filled with jaggery syrup and then sealed to retain the liquid center.

== Cultural aspects ==
Sweets (mishti) play a central role in Bengali culture and are integral to religious offerings, meals, and celebrations. From festive occasions like Durga Puja and Nababarsha (Bengali New Year) to everyday rituals, sweets are widely exchanged and consumed. Jolbhora Sandesh, with its unique design and seasonal ingredients, holds a special place among Bengal's wide variety of traditional confections.

== Seasonal significance ==
The sweet is particularly popular in winter, coinciding with the seasonal availability of nolen gur, which is harvested between December and January. During this period, the sweet is made with liquid date palm jaggery. In summer months, when nolen gur is not available, a white sugar syrup is often used as a substitute for the filling.

== Modern adaptations ==
Contemporary versions of Jolbhora Sandesh include flavors such as mango, chocolate, and strawberry, aimed at appealing to modern tastes. Despite these adaptations, the traditional version filled with nolen gur remains the most popular and widely recognized.

== Nutritional information ==
Jolbhora Sandesh has Protein 19.7%, Fat 17.7%, Carbohydrate 47.7%, Moisture 13.9%, Ash 1.6% and most important the shelf life is 15days in refrigerator conditions.
