= Bhapa pitha =

Streamed rice pitha containg molasses

Bhapa Pitha
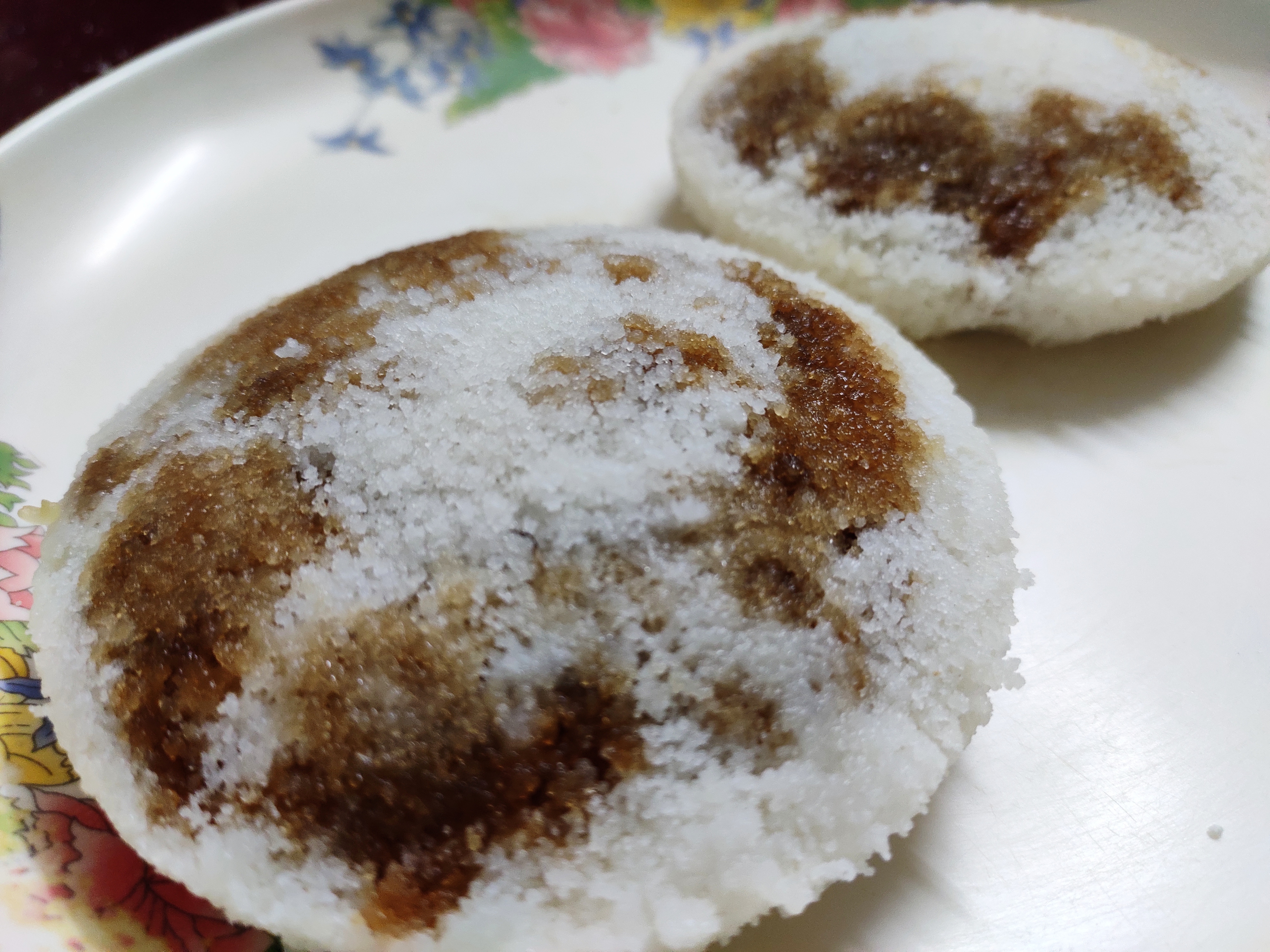
- Simple molasses Bhapa pitha made in Bangladesh
- Alternative names: Dhup pitha, dhupi pitha, dhuki pitha
- Course: Snack, breakfast
- Place of origin: India, Bangladesh
- Region or state: Indian subcontinent, Bengal
- Associated cuisine: Bangladesh, India, Nepal
- Main ingredients: Rice flour, date molasses, coconut, Jaggery
- Other information: Served with molasses, brown sugar, or jaggery

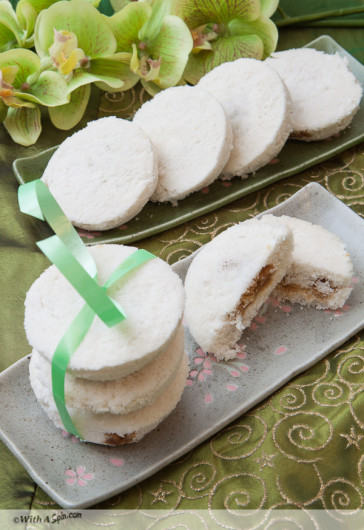
Bhapha Pitha

Bhapa pitha is a type of rice pitha from the eastern part of the Indian subcontinent in Eastern India, Northeast India, Bangladesh, and Nepal. Bhapa/Bhakka is considered to be a traditional winter dish in Bangladesh. It is a steamed rice cake made of freshly ground rice flour. The filling is composed of coconut and date molasses. Molasses can be substituted with brown sugar or jaggery.

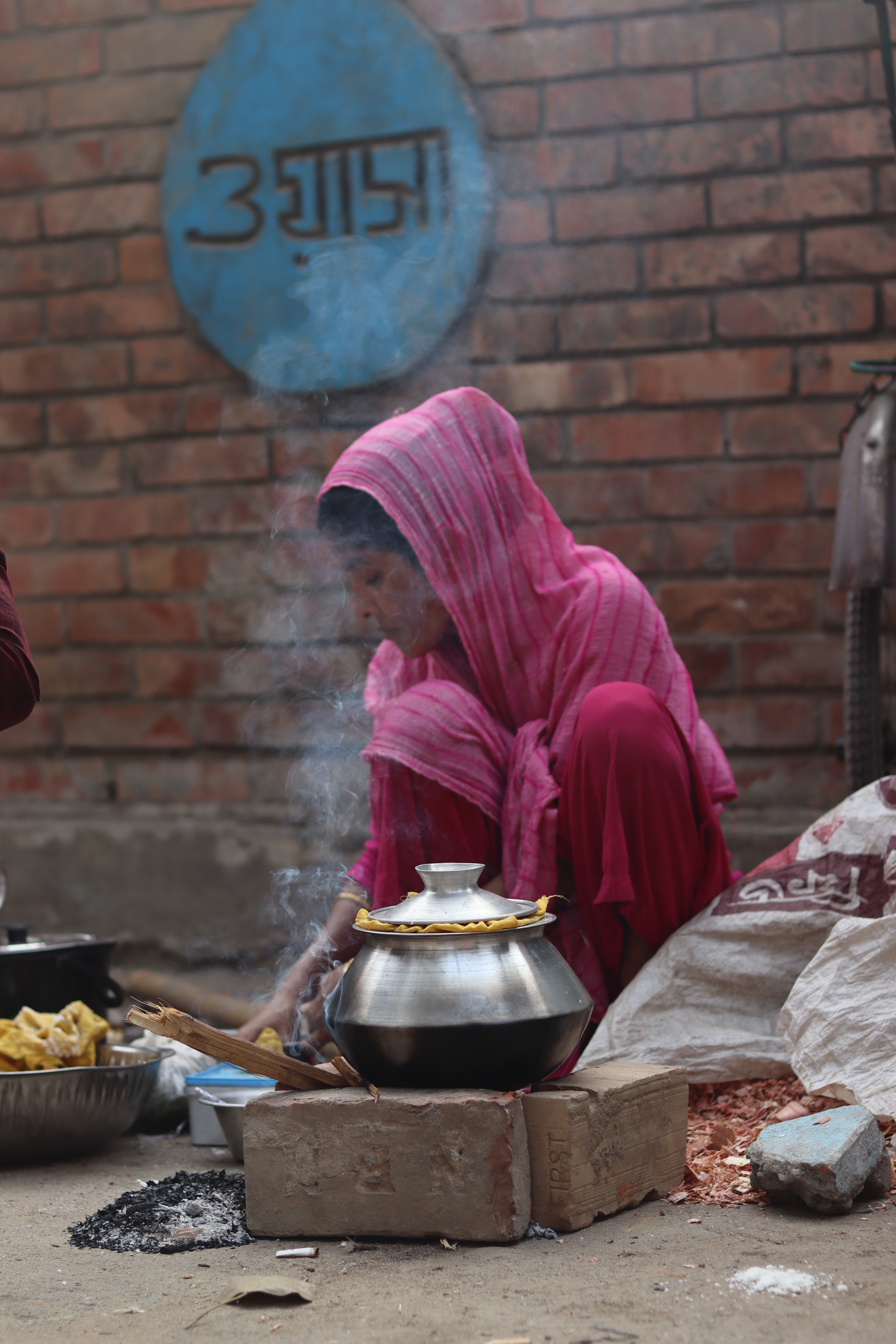
Bhapa pitha seller in Dhaka

== Ingredients ==
- Ground rice flour
- Molasses
- Coconuts
- Jaggery

== See also ==
- Bhakkha
- Chunga Pitha
