= Bikalananda Kar =

Indian confectioner

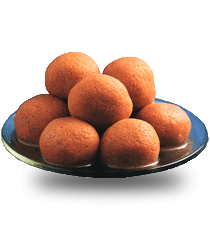
Sample of Bikalkar's "Salepur Rasagola"

Bikalananda Kar (Odia: ବିକଳାନନ୍ଦ କର) was an Indian confectioner from Salepur, Odisha and founder of "Kar & Brother" which is known for popularising the rasagola, an Indian desert. Kar laid the foundation of his shop in last of 1922. The rasagolas prepared by the descendants are considered the best rasagolas in Odisha. These rasagolas are famously named "Bikali Kar Rasagola" is sold all over Odisha and abroad.

To revive traditional Odia sweet dishes, the Government of Odisha in collaboration with Jadavpur University has set up an Industrial Training Centre, B. K. Industrial Training Centre in Cuttack named after Bikalananda Kar. The institute trains students in both modern and traditional methods of sweet making of over 500 different varieties of sweets from Odisha.

== See also ==
- Nobin Chandra Das
