= Sarada Charan Das =

Indian Businessman

- Born: 15 May 1906; Bagbazar, Calcutta, Bengal Presidency, British India
- Died: 6 September 1992 (aged 86); Bagbazar, Calcutta, West Bengal, India
- Other name: Founder of K.C. Das Pvt. Ltd
- Education: Vidyasagar College, Rajabazar Science College, University of Calcutta
- Occupations: Scientist, businessman, Confectioner, entrepreneur
- Years active: 1930–1992
- Known for: Inventor of Canned Rossogolla, Amrita Kumbha Sondesh, Ice-cream Sondesh, Sondesh Cake, Diabetic Sondesh
- Predecessor: Krishna Chandra Das (K.C. Das)
- Movement: Bengali Renaissance
- Spouse: Annapurna Devi (1912–1996)
- Children: 6
- Parent(s): Krishna Chandra Das (K.C. Das) and Shwetangini Devi
- Website: www.kcdas.co.in

Sarada Charan Das (15 May 1906 – 6 September 1992) was an Indian Bengali polymath, scientist, confectioner, entrepreneur and businessman. He was the youngest son and successor of Krishna Chandra Das (K.C. Das) and the grandson of the Bengali confectioner Nobin Chandra Das (alleged inventor of the Rossogolla). Born on 15 May 1906 in Bagbazaar, Kolkata, India, he established the first confectionery company in India, named K.C. Das Private Limited, in 1946. Sarada Charan also created artwork and competed for India at the 1956 Summer Olympics in weightlifting. He is considered as the founding father of K.C. Das Private Limited and a major innovator and pioneer of the Bengali sweetmeat industry due to his contributions towards revamping, modernizing and scientifically standardizing the confectionery industry.

== Birth and early life ==
Sarada Charan was born on 15 May 1906 to the noted confectioner family of the Das'es of Bagbazar as the youngest son of Krishna Chandra Das (K.C. Das), in Kolkata, India.

In his early twenties, after completing a degree from Vidyasagar College, Sarada Charan initially pursued a career in scientific research under physicist and Nobel Laureate Sir C.V. Raman at the Rajabazar Science College, between 1926 and 1930. However, his father Krishna Chandra strongly opposed the idea of his son working outside their prestigious family business. In order to engage and induct his youngest son into the confectionery business, Krishna Chandra Das started a brand new venture at Jorasako in 1930 appointing Sarada Charan at the helm of affairs. This shop was named after Krishna Chandra Das and later modified by Sarada Charan to its modern form "K.C. Das". Sarada Charan and his father came up with the canned form of Rossogolla in 1930; which was also the first canned sweet manufactured in India.

== Patronage ==
Sarada Charan patronised Jamini Roy's depiction of the Ramayana in seventeen parts on canvas. Jamini Roy's Ramayana is on display at the Das residence "Rossogolla Bhavan" in Kolkata. The Das residence today harbors the largest private collection of Jamini Roy paintings with 25 of the master's originals.

== Establishment of K.C. Das Grandsons ==
In 1955, Sarada Charan had a major disagreement with his second son Debendra Nath, leading to a permanent estrangement within the family. Debendra Nath left his ancestral home and family business and went on to establish an independent entity, K.C. Das Grandsons Pvt. Ltd, in 1956.

== Crisis in West Bengal ==
To combat acute scarcity of milk, the West Bengal government introduced a Milk Trade Control Order in 1965. This legislation severely curtailed the supply of milk to confectioners and resulted in a major negative impact on the business of Bengali confectioners. The K.C. Das company had to scale down operations drastically and barring the Esplanade establishment which sold savouries along with sweets, all the other K.C.Das shops were shut down, along with the historical Nobin Chandra Das establishment. West Bengal's growing energy crisis and resultant shortage of electricity added to the organization's problems.

== Death and legacy ==
Sarada Charan died at the age of 86 on 6 September 1992. On the occasion of Sarada Charan's birth centenary in 2006 and the Platinum Jubilee of the "K.C. Das" confectionery, the company formally outlined its fourfold mission statement:

== Children ==
Sarada Charan and Annapurna Devi had seven children, Rabindra Nath Das (1927–2000), Debendra Nath Das (1930–2010), Narendra Nath Das (1932–1993), Dhirendra Nath Das (1934–2018), Birendranath Das (1935–present), Monika Das (1937–1940) and Manjulika Das (1939–2012).

== See also ==
- Nobin Chandra Das
- K.C. Das
- K.C.Das Grandson
