= Ras malai =

Dessert from Bengal

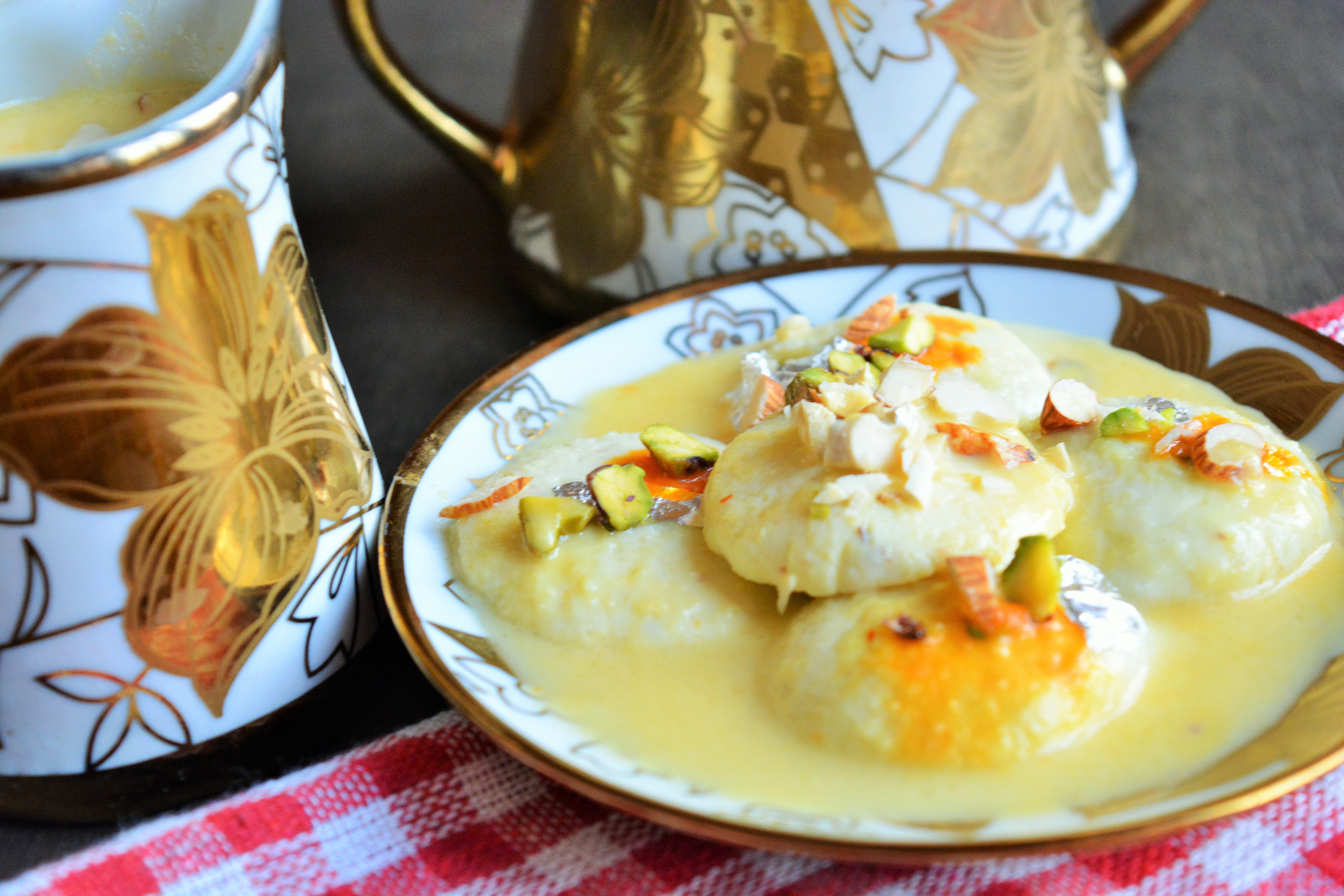
- Alternative names: Rossomalai, roshmolai, rasamalei
- Course: Dessert
- Place of origin: Bangladesh; India (West Bengal)
- Region or state: Bengal, South Asia
- Associated cuisine: India, Bangladesh, Pakistan
- Serving temperature: Cold
- Main ingredients: Chhena, malai, saffron, sugar
- Variations: Comilla's roshomalai, Kolkata's roshomalai
- Similar dishes: Rasgulla, paskha

Ras malai, also known as rasamalei or roshmalai, is a dessert that originated in the Bengal region of the Indian subcontinent. The dessert is called roshmalai in Bengali, ras malai in Hindi, and rasa malei in Odia. It is popular in India, Bangladesh, and Pakistan.

== Origin and etymology ==
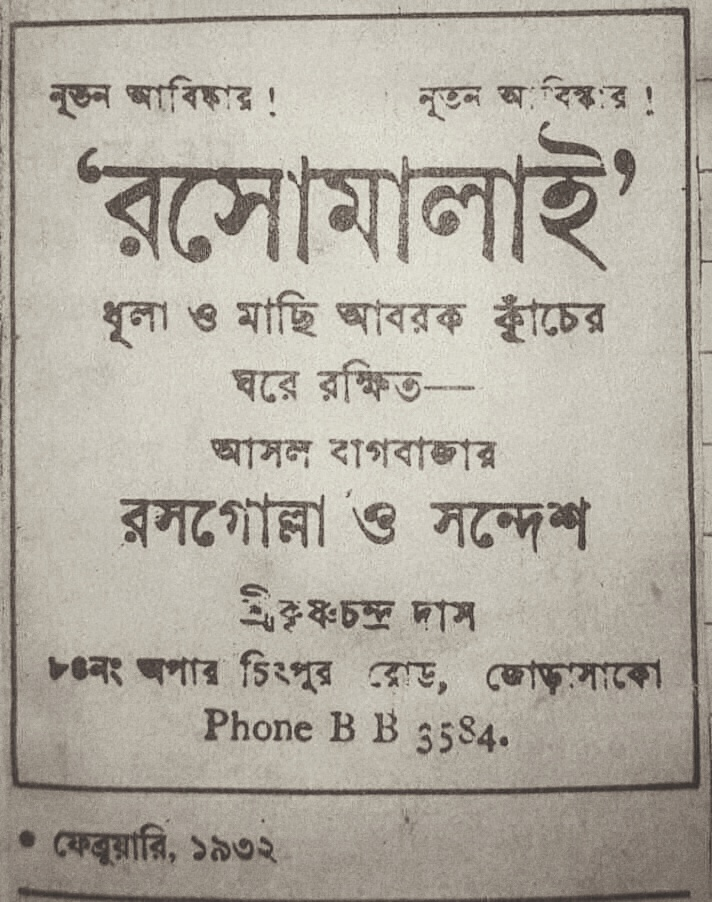
A Bengali advertisement of "Rasmalai" in February 1932 by Das grandsons claimed it as their invention

The original term for ras malai is rosh malai (Bengali: রস মালাই), which derives from the Classical Bengali word "rosho malai" with the same meaning.

The term is a combination of the Bengali word rosh (Bengali: রস), which means sap, and the Hindustani word malai (Hindi: मलाई, Urdu: ملائی), which means clotted cream, hence the name: sweet sap of clotted cream.

The sweet allegedly became popular when the Sen brothers opened Matri Bhandar in 1930 and shared their ancestral recipe in Tipperah district (now Comilla, Bangladesh) of the Bengal Province, which has been granted a geographical indication (GI) in Bangladesh. Soon, in the mid-20th century, ras malai became a regionally popular sweet across South Asia, spreading beyond Bengal. Other variations include Ras Malai of Kolkata by Krishna Chandra Das.

The Sen brothers of Comilla, operating under the Matri Bhandar brand, claim to be the original makers of the dessert. This is disputed by K.C. Das Grandsons, who claim that it was invented by K.C. Das in Kolkata.

== Process ==
Ras malai consists of flattened balls of chhena soaked in malai. Milk is boiled, and a small amount of lemon juice is added to curdle it. The whey is discarded, and the chhena is drained, cooled, and kneaded into a dough. The dough is divided into small balls, and the balls are cooked in a sugar-water mix. The balls are then soaked in milk mixed with saffron, pistachios, rose water, cardamom, or a combination of those flavourings.

== Variations ==
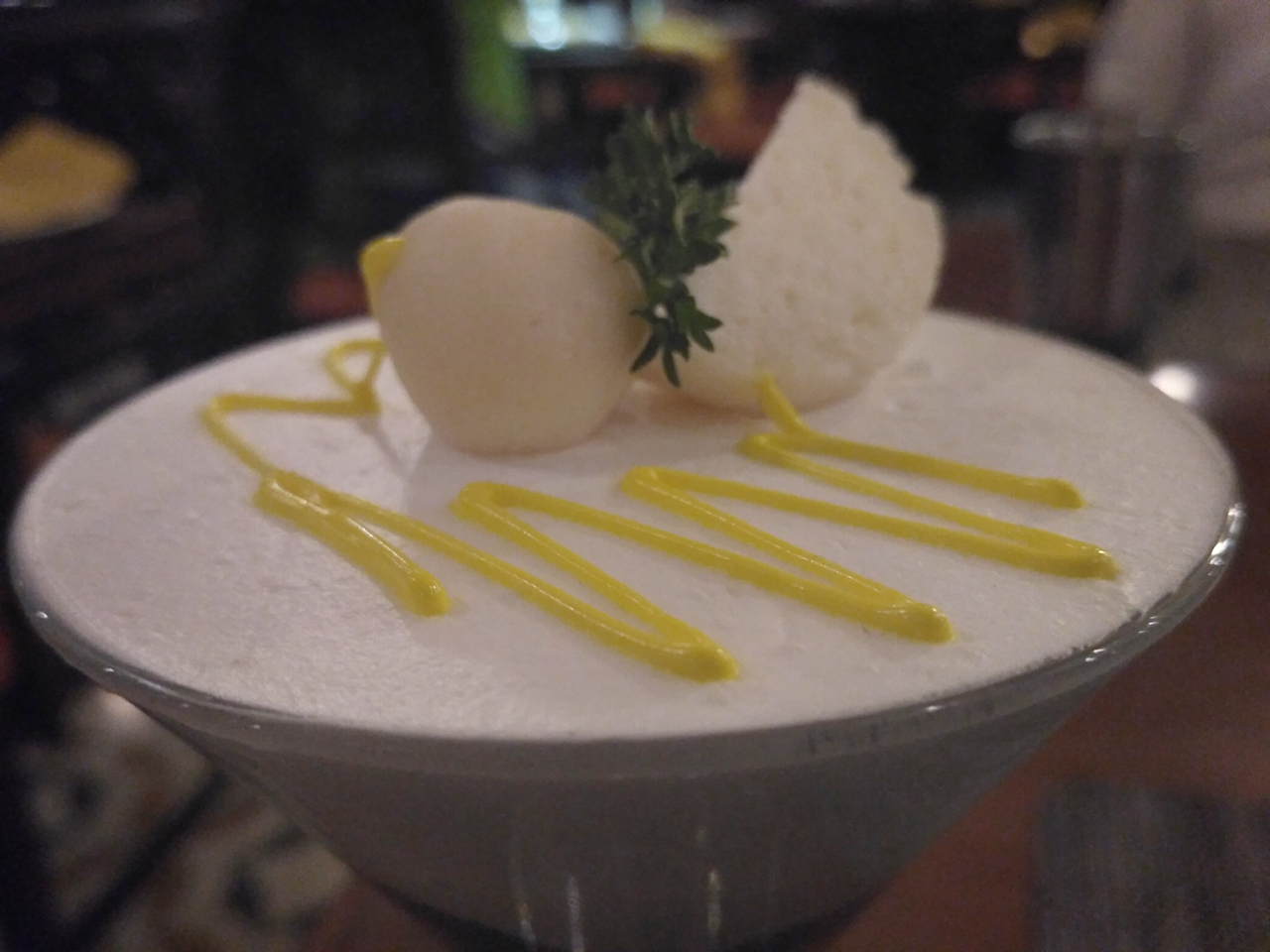
Ras malai dessert

Different types of ras malai can be found in different areas, such as Rasmanjuri of Rangpur Division. In Dhaka and Rangpur, the ras malais are similar in shape to the rasgullas, and round discs.

== See also ==
- Basundi
- Gulab jamun
- Khira sagara
- Rasabali
