= Khiramohana =

Indian dessert dish

Khira mohan
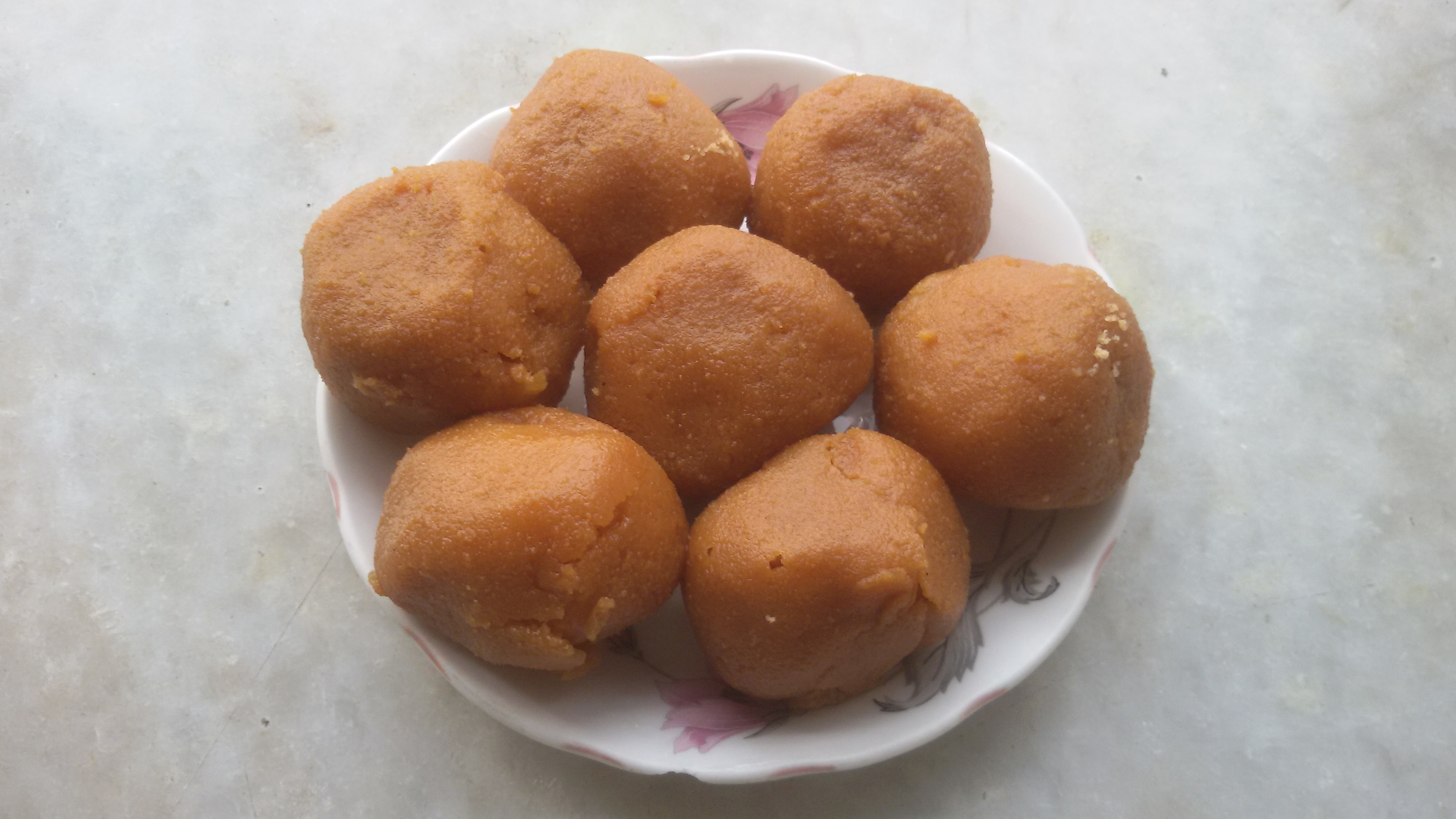
- Khiramohan
- Course: Dessert
- Place of origin: Odisha, India
- Serving temperature: Hot, cold, or room temperature
- Main ingredients: Chhena, sugar
- Variations: Pahala rasagola
- Similar dishes: Odia rasgulla

Khira mohan (Odia: କ୍ଷୀର ମୋହନ) is a creamish dessert best known in Odisha. It is made from chhena and sugar syrup. The descendant of khira mohana probably was Odia rasgulla. Food historians from Odisha suggest that the khira mohana was invented in Odisha to offer the goddess Lakshmi at Jagannath Temple, Puri.

Khir mohana or khirmohan is also called brown rasogolla.

Khirmohan is also well-known in Chauparan, Jharkhand and there are more than a dozen shops in Chauparan selling it.

== See also ==
- List of Indian sweets and desserts
