= Malai =

Type of clotted cream from India

Malai (Hindi: मलाई) is a type of clotted cream, originating from the Indian subcontinent. It is used in the cuisine of the Indian subcontinent, especially in sweets from the Indian subcontinent. It is made by heating non-homogenized whole milk to about 80 °C (180 °F) for about one hour and then cooling it. A thick yellowish layer of fat and coagulated proteins forms on the surface, which is skimmed off.

Malai has about 55% butterfat. Buffalo milk is thought to produce better malai because of its high fat content. Buffalo milk with fat content varying from 5 to 12% is boiled and then cooled down to 4 °C (39 °F) for best results. Similarly, cow's milk with milk fat from 3 to 5% is boiled and cooled to make malai.

== Uses ==
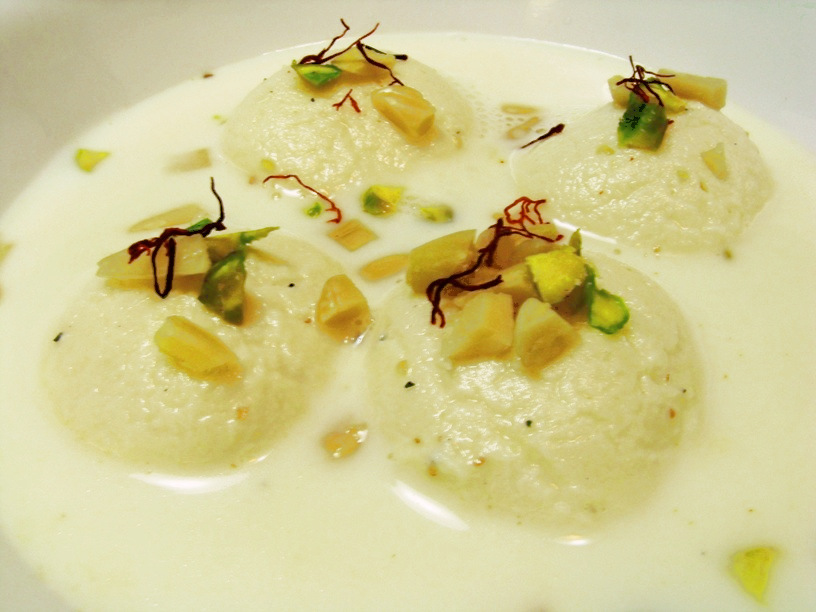
Ras malai, balls of chhena (paneer) soaked in malai

Malai is a major ingredient in malai kofta dumplings and in sweet dishes like malai pedha, ras malai and malai kulfi. Fried koftas are made with potatoes and paneer. The flavour becomes even richer when vegetables are added to it. An example of this would be methi matar malai where the main constituent is green peas.

== See also ==
- Kaymak
- Qishta
- Kulfi
- Mascarpone
