= Bhagwandas Bagla =

Bhagwandas Bagla was the first Marwari Shekhawati millionaire (crorepati). He was a very wealthy timber merchant and owned several Saw Mills. Bhagwandasji was originally from Churu, Rajasthan but proceeded his business to Burma and eventually settled in Rangoon. He proceeded his business to Burma during King Thibaw’s time. During the Anglo-Burmese War he became a big Military Supplier and Contractor, he built several roads, bridges etc. in Burma. He owned thousands of acres of Paddy lands facing Rangoon Harbour. He was a Banker, Landlord and Merchant, owned considerable properties in Rangoon, Mandalay, Moulmein and several other cities in Burma. He was awarded with the title of "Rai Bahadur" by the British Raj in February 1890.

In the 1960s, the Burmese military regime nationalized almost every business in the country. They seized the property of hundreds of thousands of Indians and forced them to leave the country Bhagwandas Bagla's family being one of them.

Sethani ka Johra (The Reservoir of the Wealthy Lady) was built by his wife which is some 3 km west by the Ratangarh road, as a relief project during the terrible ‘Chhappania Akal’, Indian famine of 1899–1900 (vikram samvat 1956) The water attracts birds and mammals such as ‘Nilgai’ (blue bull – a large antelope). The village elders in Churu say that the water in the Johra has never dried up till date.

A well-known story relates the manner in which Bagla made Rossogolla / Rasgulla popular in and around Bengal. One day Bhagwandas Bagla, an opulent businessman, stopped at Nobin Chandra Das's shop while driving by. His grandson was thirsty. Bagla asked the helper-boy of Nabin's shop to fetch a glass of water. As was the custom of the day, the boy offered sweetmeat along with water. It was the special 'Rossogolla' of Nobin Chandra's shop served on a dish. His grandson was delighted to taste this unique sweet. Seeing this, Bhagwandas Bagla himself tasted the 'Rossogolla' and was fascinated. Soon, the fame of this special sweet spread and within a short span of 6 to 7 years, Rossogolla won the hearts of millions in and outside Bengal.

Bhagwandas Bagla believed in giving back to the society and serving the community. He contributed with open hands and was instrumental in setting up various Hospitals/Schools/Temples in his hometown Churu, Calcutta and in Rangoon. Just before his death in 1895 he provided Rs. 4.50 Lakhs for building a 60 bedded Hospital (popularly known as The Marwari Hindu Hospital) in Calcutta opposite to his house on Harrison Road (now Mahatma Gandhi Road) and also gave Rs. 1 Lakh to the Maharaja of Bikaner to establish a 60 bedded Hospital at Bikaner, Rajathan and two Hospitals of 30 beds each for ladies and gents at Churu, Rajasthan. The "Bagla School Road" in his hometown Churu was named in his honour by the Rajasthan Government.

In India

- Shri Satyanarayan Temple, Churu, Rajasthan
- Shri Shivalaya, Churu, Rajasthan
- Shri Sheetala Mata Temple, Churu, Rajasthan
- B D Bagla High School, Churu, Rajasthan
- Bagla Girls High School, Churu, Rajasthan - started in 1895 (vikram samvat 1960)
- Hospital with 30 beds each for Ladies and Gents in the Garh (Fort), Churu, Rajasthan - started in 1895
- Hindu Burning Ghat (Cremation Ground), Churu
- Hospital with 60 beds at Bikaner, Rajasthan - started in 1902
- Bhagwandas Bagla Marwari Hindu Hospital, M.G.Road, Calcutta
- Various Dharamshalas at Rameshwaram, Mokamah, Bombay, Kodambeshwar (Rajasthan), Brindavan, Benaras, Haridwar
- Various Pathshalas at Churu, Brindavan, Benaras, Haridwar

In Burma

- Shri Satyanarayan Temple in Pabedan Township, 29th Street, Rangoon
- Vishnu Temples in Mandalay and Mormin, Myanmar
- Bhagwandas Bagla Dharamshala, 29th Street, Rangoon
- Lakshminarayan Bagla Dharamshala, 30th Street, Rangoon
- Hindu Burning Ghat, Kemendine Road, Rangoon
- Shri Satyanarayan Temple, Mandalay
- Hindu Burning Ghat (Cremation Ground), Mandalay
- Shri Durga Bari, Moulmein
- Hindu Burning Ghat (Cremation Ground), Moulmein
