= Nobin Chandra Das =

Bengali confectioner

- Born: 1845; Paschim Medinipur District, Bengal Presidency, British India (present-day Kolkata, West Bengal, India)
- Died: 1925 (aged 80); Bagbazar, Calcutta
- Other names: Nobin Moira of Bagbazar, Columbus of Rossogolla
- Occupations: Businessman, Confectioner, entrepreneur
- Years active: 1864–1925
- Known for: Rosogolla
- Successor: Krishna Chandra Das (K.C. Das)
- Movement: Bengali Renaissance
- Spouse: Khirodmoni Devi
- Children: 1
- Relatives: Bhola Moira (Grandfather-in-law)
- Website: www.kcdas.co.in

Nobin Chandra Das (1845–1925) was a Bengali confectioner, popularly referred as the "Columbus of Rossogolla".

== Early life and career ==
Nobin Chandra was born in 1845. In 1864, driven by poverty and with little provision to complete his education, he initially started working for the Indra family, confectioners from Shantipur in the Nadia district of Bengal. They were distant relatives of Nobin Chandra's mother, and their shop was located on Chitpur road in Bagbazar, Kolkata. Nobin Chandra was reportedly humiliated by the Indras, left the job and, aged 18, started his own sweet-shop at Jorasanko. Being respectable and prosperous sugar merchants, Nobin's family were initially unsupportive of his decision to run a small neighborhood corner shop. They even labeled him "moira" (a 19th Century Bengali slur word for a profession not held in high esteem). Ironically, the word has evolved to evoke a positive connotation, even admiration.

Nobin Chandra's Jorasanko business failed as he fell out with his partner and Nobin Chandra had no resources to offer credit to his customers, which competitors had begun doing. In 1866, he opened another shop on Chitpur Road directly across his first shop in Bagbazar. Most sweets were either the "Sondesh/Sandesh" variety, and made exclusively for the affluent or sweets made of "dal" (lentils) or flour from various grains.

== Creation of Rosogolla ==
In 1868, Nobin Chandra modified the original recipe for the sweet now known as "Rossogolla," creating a version with a longer shelf life. The sweet became popular during his time and was accessible across different economic segments, though it took time to gain wider recognition in the absence of modern advertising and media

== Legacy ==
Nobin Chandra left his legacy to his son Krishna Chandra Das.

In 2018, director Pavel made a film Rosogolla on the life of Nobin Chandra Das. Actor Ujaan Ganguly portrayed Nobin in the film.

== See also ==
- Bikalananda Kar
- K.C. Das
- Rasgulla
- Sarada Charan Das
- K.C. Das Grandsons
- Bengali cuisine
