= K. C. Das =

Bengali confectioner, entrepreneur, businessman and cultural icon

Krishna Chandra Das
- কৃষ্ণচন্দ্র দাশ
- Portrait of Krishna Chandra Das
- Born: 1869; Bagbazar, Calcutta, Bengal Presidency, British India
- Died: 1934 (aged 65); Bagbazar, Calcutta, Bengal Presidency, British India
- Occupations: Businessman, confectioner, entrepreneur
- Years active: 1900–1934
- Known for: Inventor of Canned Rossogolla, alleged inventor or rosso malai, head of K.C. Das Confectioner
- Predecessor: Nobin Chandra Das
- Successor: Sarada Charan Das
- Spouse: Shwetangini Devi
- Children: 6, including Sarada Charan Das
- Relatives: Bhola Moira
- Website: kcdas.co.in

Krishna Chandra Das, also known as K.C. Das (Bengali: কৃষ্ণচন্দ্র দাশ; 1869–1934), was a Bengali confectioner, entrepreneur, and businessman. He contributed to the modernization of traditional Bengali sweets.

Born in 1869, in Bagbazar, Kolkata, India, Das was the only son of the Bengali confectioner and inventor, Nobin Chandra Das. He was credited with creating roshomalai (popularly known by its Hindi name rasmalai) and selling canned rosogollas (popularly known as rasgulla). The sweets were later popularized by his family company, K.C. Das Private Limited, founded by his son, Sarada Charan Das.

== Early life and career ==
Das was born into a family of confectioners; his father was Nobin Chandra Das, and his mother was Khridmoni Devi. His great-grandfather, Bholanath Dey, also known as "Bhola Moira," was a professional confectioner and a poet.

== Later life and family ==
Das was married to Swetangini Devi, with whom he had five sons and a daughter. In 1930, he opened his first shop, Krishna Chandra Das Confectioner, in partnership with his youngest son Sarada Charan Das.

== Contributions and legacy ==
Das is credited with inventing roshomalai and pioneering the concept of canned roshogolla, though he is often mistakenly credited for reinventing the latter, which was allegedly created by his father, Nobin Chandra Das.

To market roshomalai, Das opened a new confectionery shop in Jorasanko in 1930, with his youngest son Sarada Charan Das. From that location, he promoted canned rasgulla, reportedly the first canned dessert manufactured in India.

Krishna Chandra Das died in 1934, entrusting the company's operations to his son Sarada Charan Das.

== See also ==
- Bengali cuisine
- K.C. Das Grandsons
