= Matri Bhandar =

Sweet shop in Bangladesh

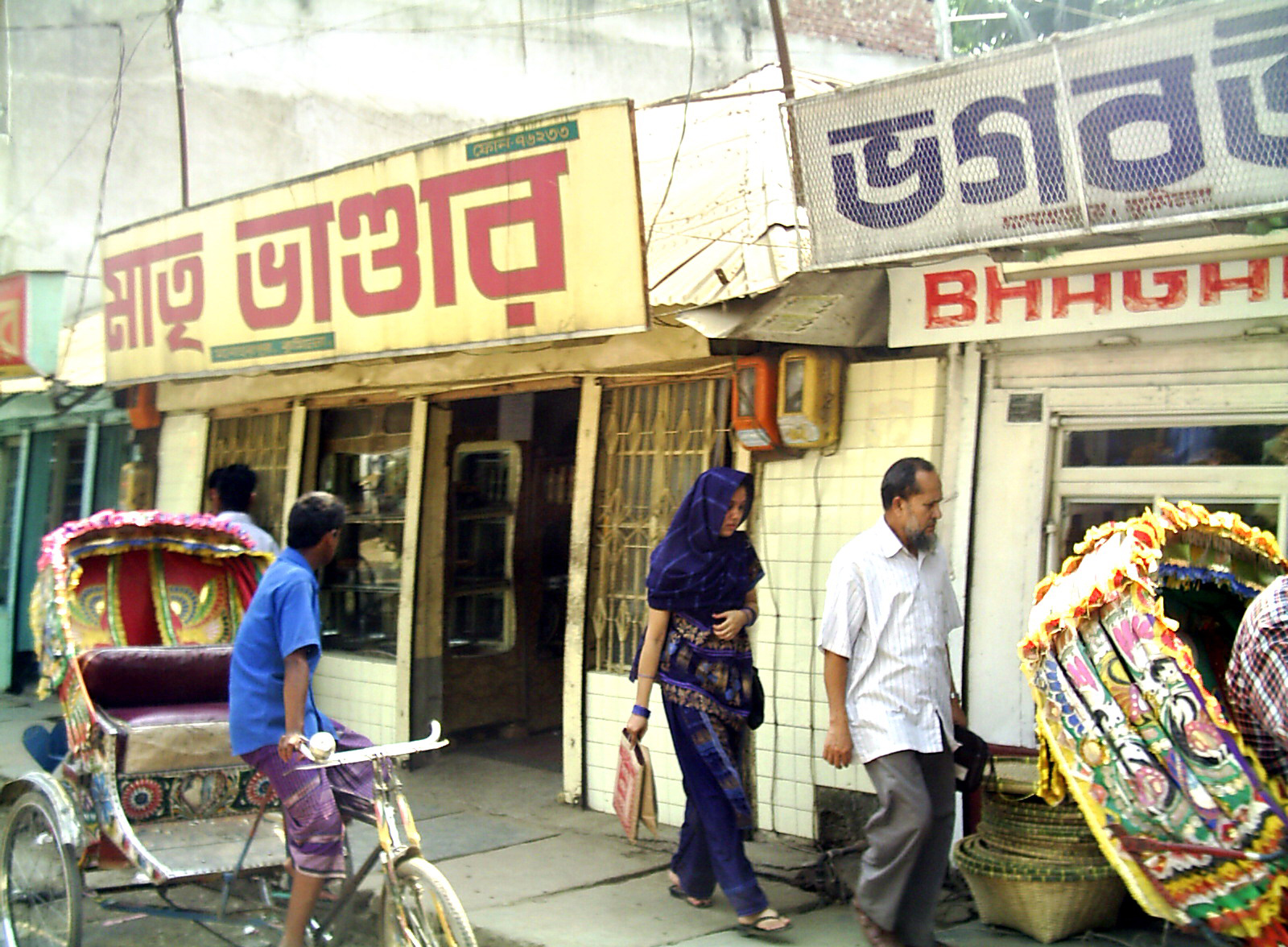
- Formation: 1930
- Type: Confectionery store
- Location: 362 A. K. Fazlul Haque Road, Comilla, Bangladesh
- Coordinates: 23.4619157°N 91.182947°E
- Products: Sweets (esp. Rasmalai)
- Owner: Anirban Sen
- Founder: Khanindra Sen and Manindra Sen
- Staff: 25

Matri Bhandar (Bengali: মাতৃ ভাণ্ডার) is a Bangladeshi traditional confectionery store well known for Rasmalai. The taste of Rasmalai of Matri Bhandar has been appreciated in various national and international important places and events. Rasmalai of Matribhandar is on the list of favorite food of various famous and important personalities. Among them are Earl Robert Miller and Geeta Pasi, who expressed their love for Matri Bhandar's product.

== Location ==
The Matri Bhandar shop in Comilla town is located along with three other popular confectionery shops in Manoharpur suburb. The shop has been built very close to Rajarajeshwari Kalibari.

== History ==
Khanindra and Monindra Sengupta were proprietor of the shop when it was established. They were two brothers originated from Brahmanbaria who built the shop in 1930 using one man's space. Ten years later, after one of the two founding brothers left for the land of no return, Shankar Sen inherited his father's shop and started running it. Khaninder Sen's son Shankar Sen died 78 years after taking charge of the shop. The current owner of Matri Bhandar is Anirban Sen Gupta. Over time, Rasmalai of Matri Bhandar has become a part of the national culture of Comilla in this era.

== Store ownership ==
- 1st generation: Khanindra Sen Gupta & Manindra Sen Gupta
- 2nd generation: Shanker Sen Gupta
- 3rd generation: Anirban Sen Gupta

== Sales ==
In February 2021, price of Rasmalai was Tk 260 per kg. In November, the price increased by Taka 20. There is a limit for purchase till 5 kg. Matri Bhandar sells at least 1000 kg Rasmalai per day.

== Confectionery stores in the same name ==
There are many sweet shops in Comilla in the same name "Matri Bhandar". So it is difficult for people to find the real Matri Bhandar shop. In most cases, fake shops has a slight difference in the name, such as a word before or after the name.

== GI Registration ==
Finally, after constant effort by the government to get Rasmalai geographical indication registration for the Matri Bhandar, it got approval with 3 other products simultaneously on 1 January 2024.

== In popular culture ==
In the book Misir Ali Omnibas (Vol. 2) of Misir Ali's novel series, it is mentioned that a character has bought a packet of Matri Bhandar's Rasmalai.
