= K. C. Das Grandsons =

Indian confectionery

K. C. Das Grandson Pvt. Ltd.
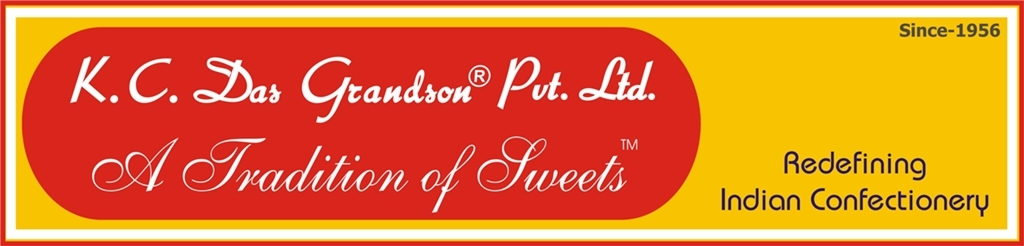
- Formation: 1956
- Location: Kolkata, West Bengal
- Founder: Debendra Nath Das
- Website: kcdas.com

K. C. Das Grandson Pvt. Ltd. Is an Indian confectionery best known for its sweets and snacks. It is especially known for the white spongy form of rossogolla in Bengal, invented by the founder's ancestor, Nobin Chandra Das. In 2023, TasteAtlas described KC Das as having a "legacy extends beyond its sweets, as it represents a vital part of Kolkata's cultural and gastronomic heritage".

== History ==
During 1868, Nobin Chandra Das, who belonged to Kolkata, experimentally developed the first Rossogolla. Subsequently, K.C. Das, who was Nobin Das's son began to can the rasgulla which resulted in the widespread availability of the sweets. His son, Sarada Charan Das, incorporated and established the family enterprise as K.C.Das Private Limited and was primarily responsible for driving the explosive growth in business. In 1955, Sarada Charan had a major disagreement with his second son, Debendra Nath Das, which led to a permanent estrangement within the family. Debendra Nath Das chose to step out of the family and established his own Indian confectionery store in Kalighat, naming it as "K. C. Das Grandson" after his late grandfather.

== Exports ==
K. C. Das Grandson’s products are widely consumed in Bengal and are also exported to countries such as Bangladesh, the United Kingdom, and the United States.
