= Rasgulla =

Syrupy dessert popular in South Asia

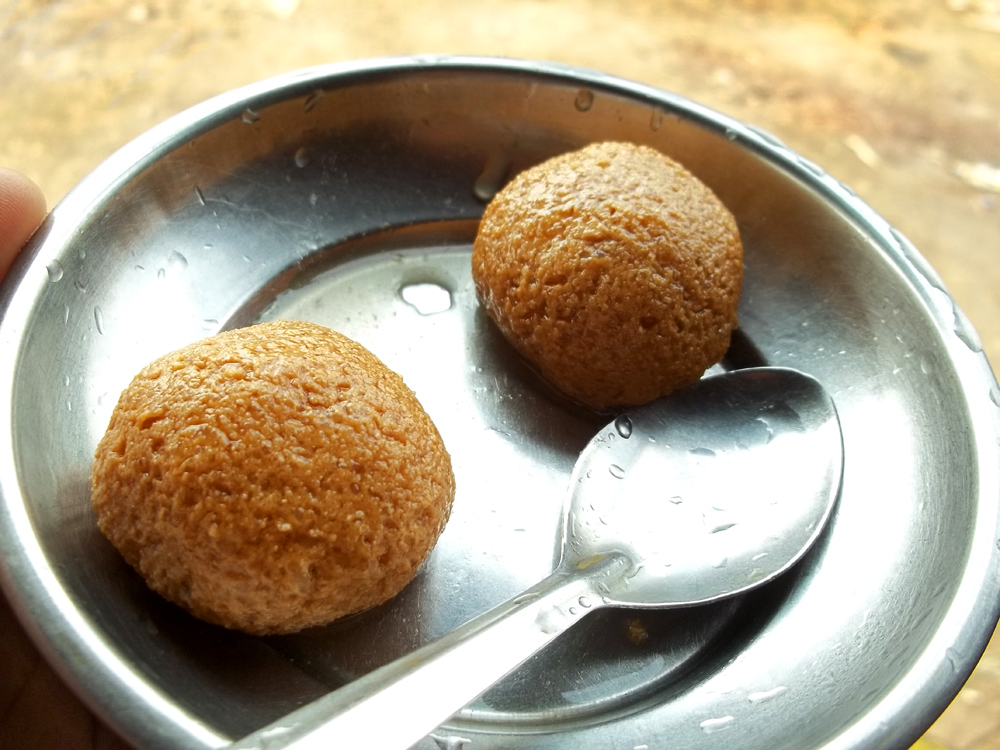
- The two main variations of the sweet. The one on the left is from West Bengal, and the one on the right is from Odisha.
- Type: Soft sweet soaked in syrup
- Course: Dessert
- Place of origin: West Bengal, Odisha
- Region or state: Eastern India
- Associated cuisine: Indian
- Serving temperature: Hot, cold, or room temperature
- Main ingredients: Chhena, sugar
- Variations: Bengali roshogolla, Odia rasagolla
- Similar dishes: Ras malai, Chomchom, khiramohana, Khondoler misti

Rasgulla (literally "syrup-filled ball") (Note: Also known as rasagola, rosogola, or rosogolla. IPA: [ɾəsɡʊlːaː], Bengali: [ɾɔʃɡolːa].) is a syrupy dessert popular in the eastern part of the Indian subcontinent. It is made from ball-shaped dumplings of chhena dough cooked in light sugar syrup until the syrup permeates the dumplings.

While it is nearly universally agreed that the dessert originated in the eastern Indian subcontinent, the exact locus of origin is disputed between locations such as West Bengal and Odisha, where it is offered at the Puri Jagannath Temple.

In 2017, when West Bengal received its rosogolla's geographical indication (GI) status, the Registry Office of India clarified that West Bengal was given GI status for Banglar rosogolla, and Odisha could claim it too if it cited the place of origin of its variant along with colour, texture, taste, juice content, and method of manufacture. In 2019, the Government of Odisha was granted the GI status for "Odisha rasagola" (Odia rasagola).

== Names ==
The dessert is pronounced [rɔʃoɡolːa] in Bengali, pronounced [ɾɔsɔɡola] in Odia. The common English name "Rasgulla" is derived from the Hindi words ras 'juice' and gullā 'ball'.

Other names for the dish include rasagulla, rasagola, rasagolla, and rasbhari or rasbari (Nepali).

== History ==
=== Claims of invention in Bengal ===
According to sweetmeat researcher Haripada Bhowmick, dela rasagulla was popular in Nabadwip and Phulia of Nadia. Sri Chaitanya loved this type of rasagulla, and the art of its making spread to other regions during the Bhakti movement. The spongy, white rosogolla is believed to have been introduced in present-day West Bengal in 1868 by the Kolkata-based confectioner Nobin Chandra Das. Das started making rosogolla by processing the mixture of chhena and semolina in boiling sugar syrup in contrast to the mixture sans semolina in the original rosogolla in his sweet shop in Sutanuti (present-day Bagbazar).

Another theory is that rosogolla was first prepared by someone else in Bengal, and Das only popularised it. In Banglar Khabar (1987), food historian Pranab Ray writes that a man named Braja Moira introduced rosogolla in his shop near Calcutta High Court in 1866, two years before Das started selling it. In 1906, Panchana Bandopadhyay wrote that rosogolla was invented in the 19th century by Haradhan Mondal (Moira), a Phulia-based sweetmaker who worked for the Pal Chowdhurys of Ranaghat. According to Mistikatha, a newspaper published by the West Bengal Sweetmeat Traders Association, many other people prepared similar sweets under different names, such as gopalgolla (prepared by Gopal Moira of Burdwan district), jatingolla, bhabanigolla, and rasugolla. Food historian Michael Krondl says that irrespective of its origin, rosogolla likely predates Nobin Chandra Das. A sales brochure of the company run by Das's descendants also hints at this: "it is hard to tell whether or not cruder versions of similar sweets existed anywhere at that time. Even if they did, they did not match the quality of Nobin Chandra, and having failed to excite the Bengali palate, they slipped into oblivion."

Bhagwandas Bagla, a Marwari businessman and a customer of Nobin Chandra Das, popularised the Bengali rosogolla beyond the shop's locality by ordering huge amounts.

=== Modern popularity ===
In 1930, the introduction of vacuum packing by Nobin Chandra's son Krishna Chandra Das led to the availability of canned rosogollas, which made the dessert popular outside Kolkata and then outside India. Krishna Chandra's son Sarada Charan Das established the K. C. Das Pvt Ltd company in 1946. Sarada Charan's younger, estranged son Debendra Nath established K.C. Das Grandsons in 1956.

Today, canned rasgullas are available throughout India, Pakistan, and Bangladesh, as well as in South Asian grocery stores outside the Indian subcontinent. In Nepal, rasgulla became popular under the name rasbari.

The Indian space agency, ISRO, is developing dehydrated rasgullas and other dishes for Indian astronauts in its planned crewed missions.

In 2015, the Odisha government initiated a move to get geographical indication (GI) status for the rasagulla made in Pahala. On 30 July, the people of Odisha celebrated "Rasagola Dibasa" ("Rasgulla Day") to reaffirm Odisha as the dish's origin. In August, West Bengal contested Odisha's move to obtain GI status. In 2015, the Odisha state government constituted three committees to claim the rasgulla. The committees submitted their interim report to the government. Noted journalist and food researcher Bhakta Tripathy and a member of the committee had submitted a dossier containing historical evidence of rasgulla origin in Odisha. The Science and Technology Department of the West Bengal government also started the process to get its own GI status for the dessert.

=== Alternative claims of Puri temple tradition of Odisha ===
According to historians of Odisha, the rasgulla originated in Puri, as khira mohana, which later evolved into the Pahala rasgulla. It has been traditionally offered as bhog, a religious offering, to goddess Lakshmi at Jagannath Temple, Puri. According to the local legend, Lakshmi got upset because her husband, Lord Jagannath, went on a 9-day sojourn (the ratha yatra) without her consent, so she locked Jai Vijay Dwar, one of the temple gates, and prevented his convoy from reentering the temple's Garbhagṛha (sanctum sanctorum). Jagannath offered her rasgullas to appease her. This ritual, known as Bachanika, is part of the "Niladri Bije" (or "Arrival of the God") observance, which marks the return of the deities to the temple after the Ratha Yatra.

Jagannath Temple scholars, such as Laxmidhar Pujapanda, and researchers like Jagabandhu Padhi say the tradition dates to the 12th century, when the temple was first built. Pujapanda says the Niladri Bije tradition is mentioned in Niladri Mahodaya, which dates to the 18th century by Sarat Chandra Mahapatra. According to Mahapatra, several temple scriptures over 300 years old have evidence of the rasgulla offering ritual in Puri.

According to folklore, Pahala (a village on the outskirts of Odisha's capital, Bhubaneswar) had many cows. The village produced excess milk, and the villagers threw it away when it spoiled. When a priest from the Jagannath Temple saw this, he taught them the art of curdling, including the recipe for rasagulla. Pahala thus became the biggest market for chhena-based sweets in the area.

According to Asit Mohanty, an Odia research scholar on the Jagannath cult and traditions, the sweet is mentioned as "Rasagola" in the 15th-century text Jagamohana Ramayana of Balaram Das.

The text mentions rasagola along with other sweets found in Odisha. There is also mention of many other cheese sweets like chhenapuri, chhenaladu, and rasabali. Another text, Prema-panchamruta of Bhupati, also mentions cheese (chhena). It is argued that the cheese-making process was well known before the Portuguese came to Odisha.

According to the Bengali culinary historian Pritha Sen, in the mid-18th century, many Odia cooks were employed in Bengali homes who arguably introduced rasgulla along with many other Odia dishes, but there is no proof of that. According to another theory, Bengali visitors to Puri carried the recipe for rasgulla back to Bengal in the 19th century, but evidence of that is also lacking.

According to food historians K. T. Achaya and Chitra Banerji, there are no references to cheese (including chhena) in India before the 17th century. The milk-based sweets were mainly made up of khoa, before the Portuguese influence led to the introduction of cheese-based sweets, so it is highly unlikely that a cheese-based dish was offered at Jagannath Temple in the 12th century. According to Nobin Chandra Das's descendant Animikh Roy and historian Haripada Bhowmik, rasgulla is not among the chhappan bhog ("56 offerings") in the temple's early records; the name was coined in Bengal. They also say it would have been blasphemy to offer something made from spoiled milk (chhena) to a deity. But Michael Krondl argued that Hindu dietary rules vary by region and that this restriction may not have existed in present-day Odisha. Krondl gave no substantial information to uphold this claim.

== Culture ==
=== Niladri Bije ===
In Odisha, rasagollas are ceremonially offered in Niladri Bije, a ritual commemorating the homecoming of the gods Jagannath, Balaram, and Subhadra. This ritual is also known as Rasagolla Dibas. Sand artist Sudarshan Patnaik made a sand sculpture in Puri Beach depicting Jagannath offering rasagolla to Lakshmi.

=== Rosogolla Utsob ===
To pay tribute to the inventor of rosogolla, Nobin Chandra Das, and to promote the Bengali claim of authenticity over rosogolla, since 2017 the government of West Bengal has celebrated "Rosogolla Utsob" every year on 28 December. At the 2017 rosogolla festival, Bengali confectioners prepared the world's largest rasgulla, which weighed nine kilograms. To celebrate the 150th anniversary of rosogolla's invention, the government of West Bengal organised a three-day 'Rosogolla festival' from 28 to 30 December 2018.

== Preparation ==
To prepare rasgulla, the cheese (chhena) mixture is formed into small balls. These balls are then simmered in a sugar syrup. It can also be prepared using a pressure cooker or an oven.

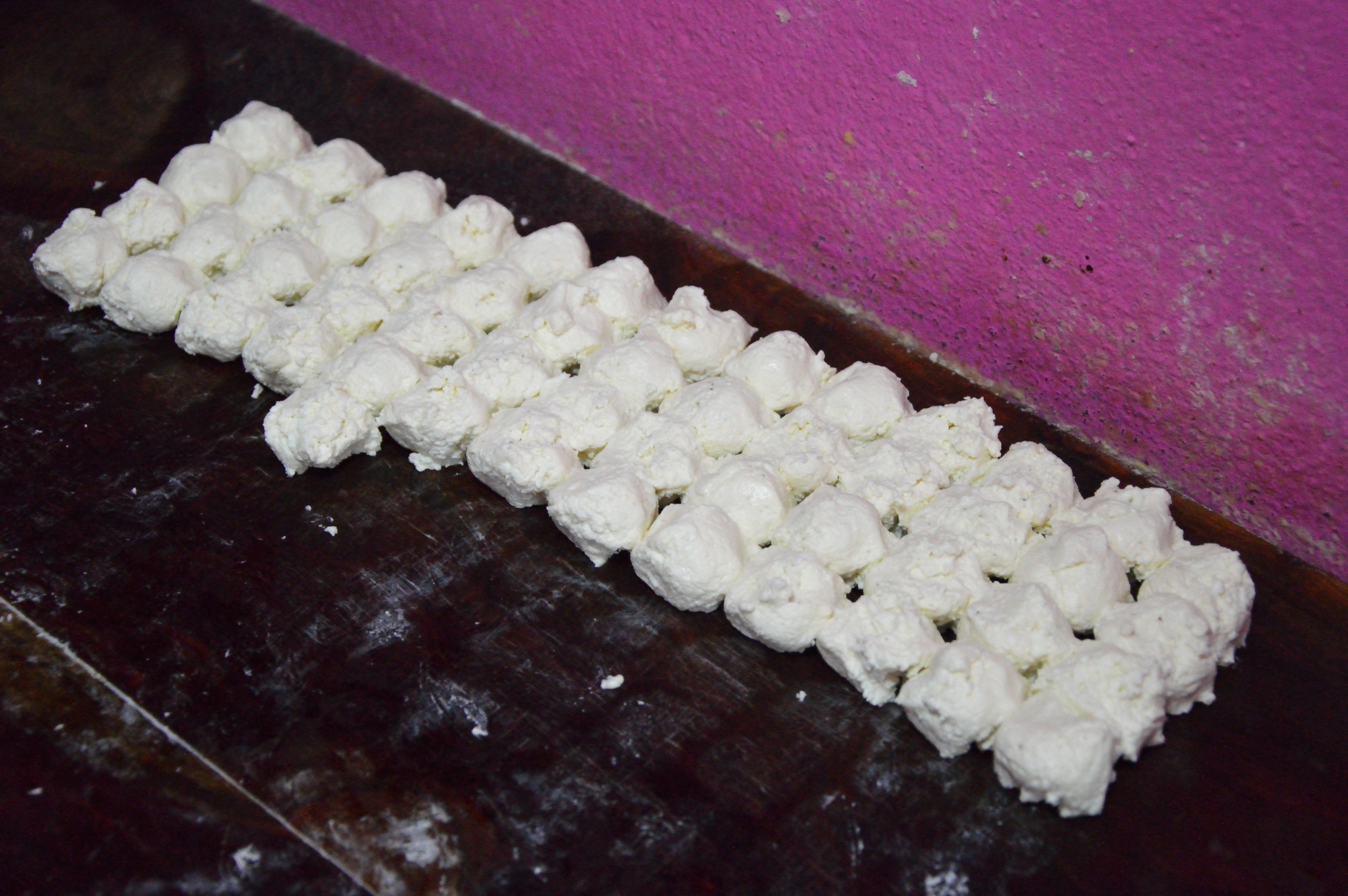
Chhena divided into balls

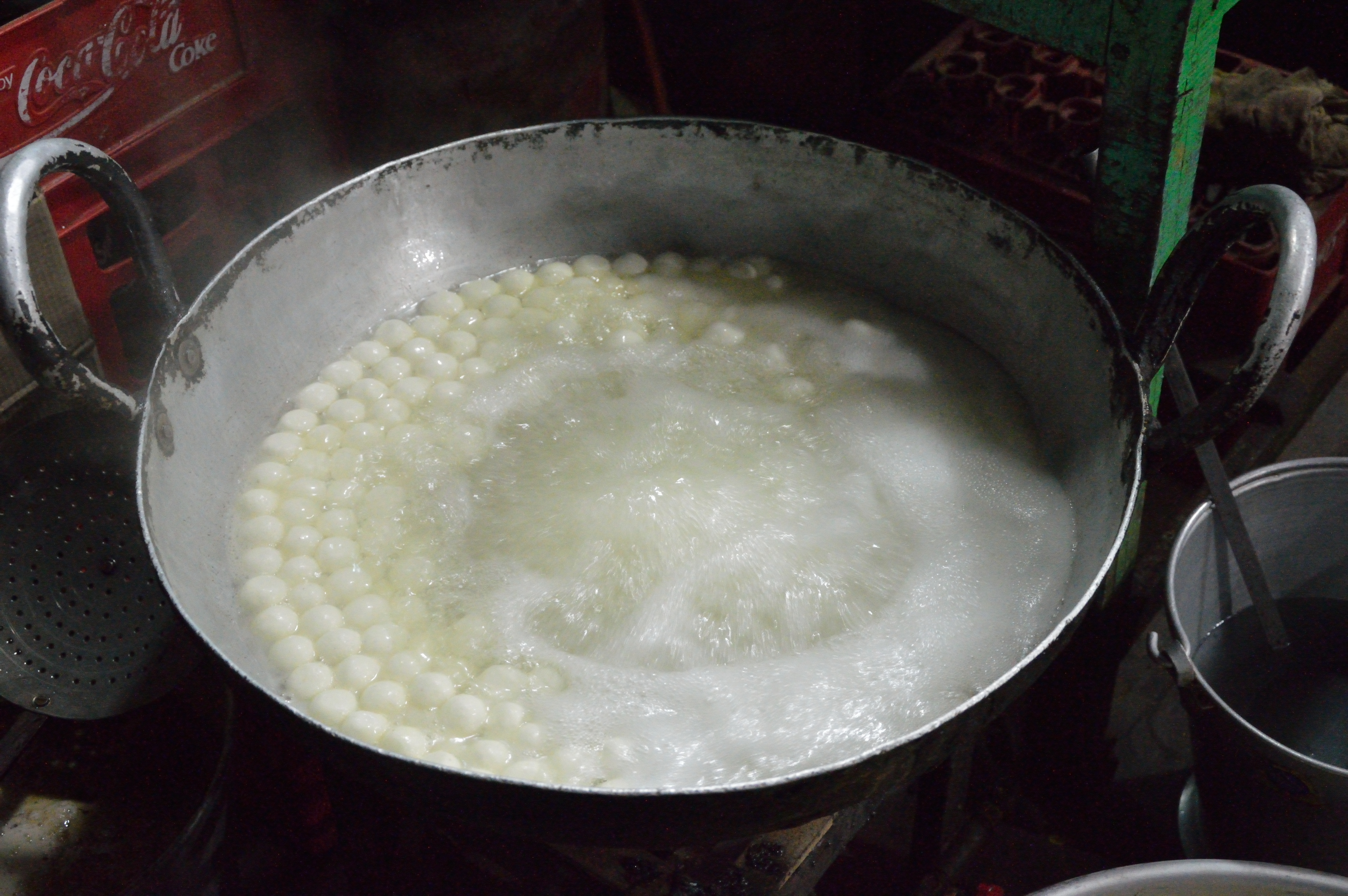
Chenna balls being boiled

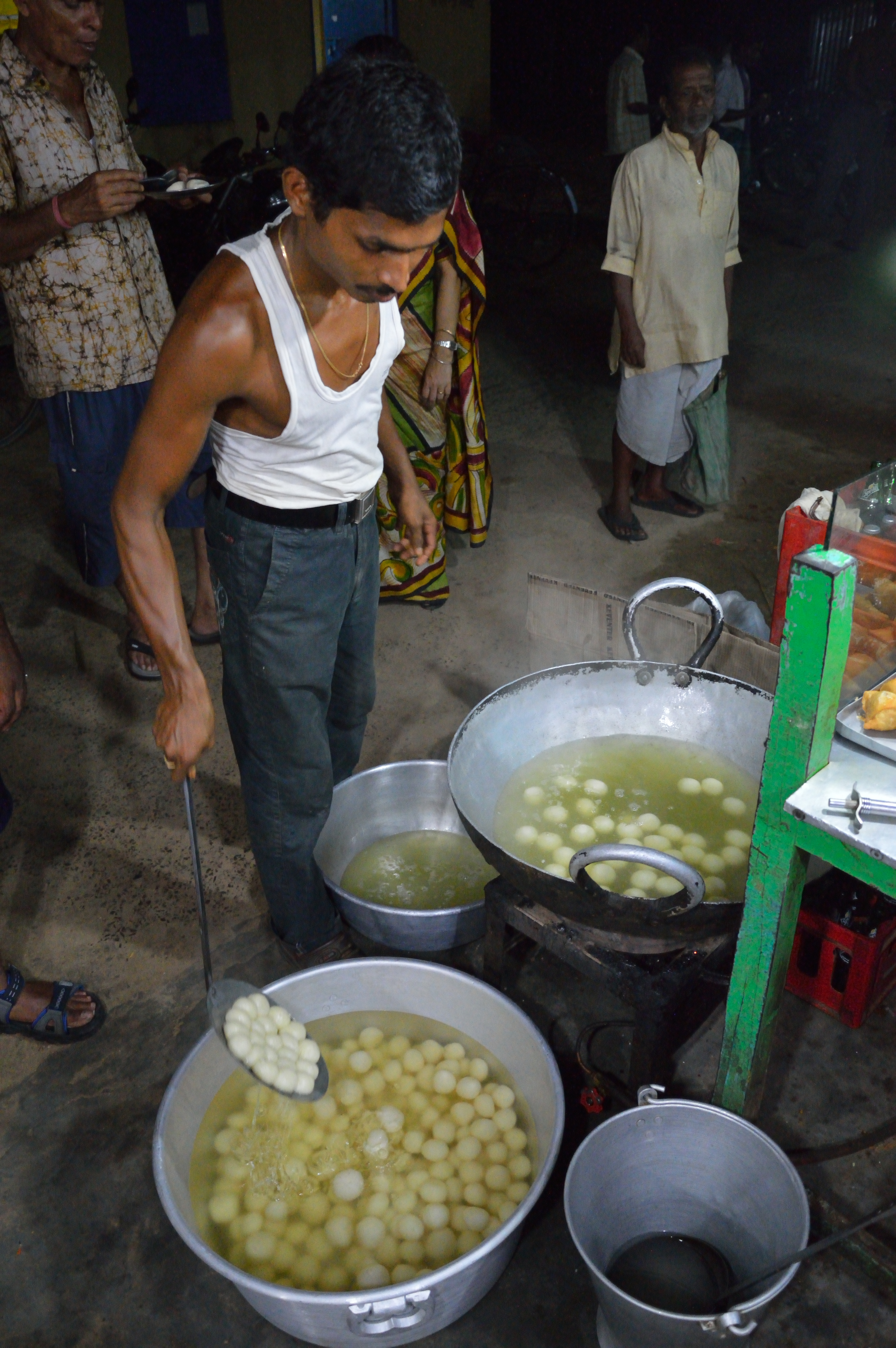
Rasgulla being taken out of the syrup

== Variations ==
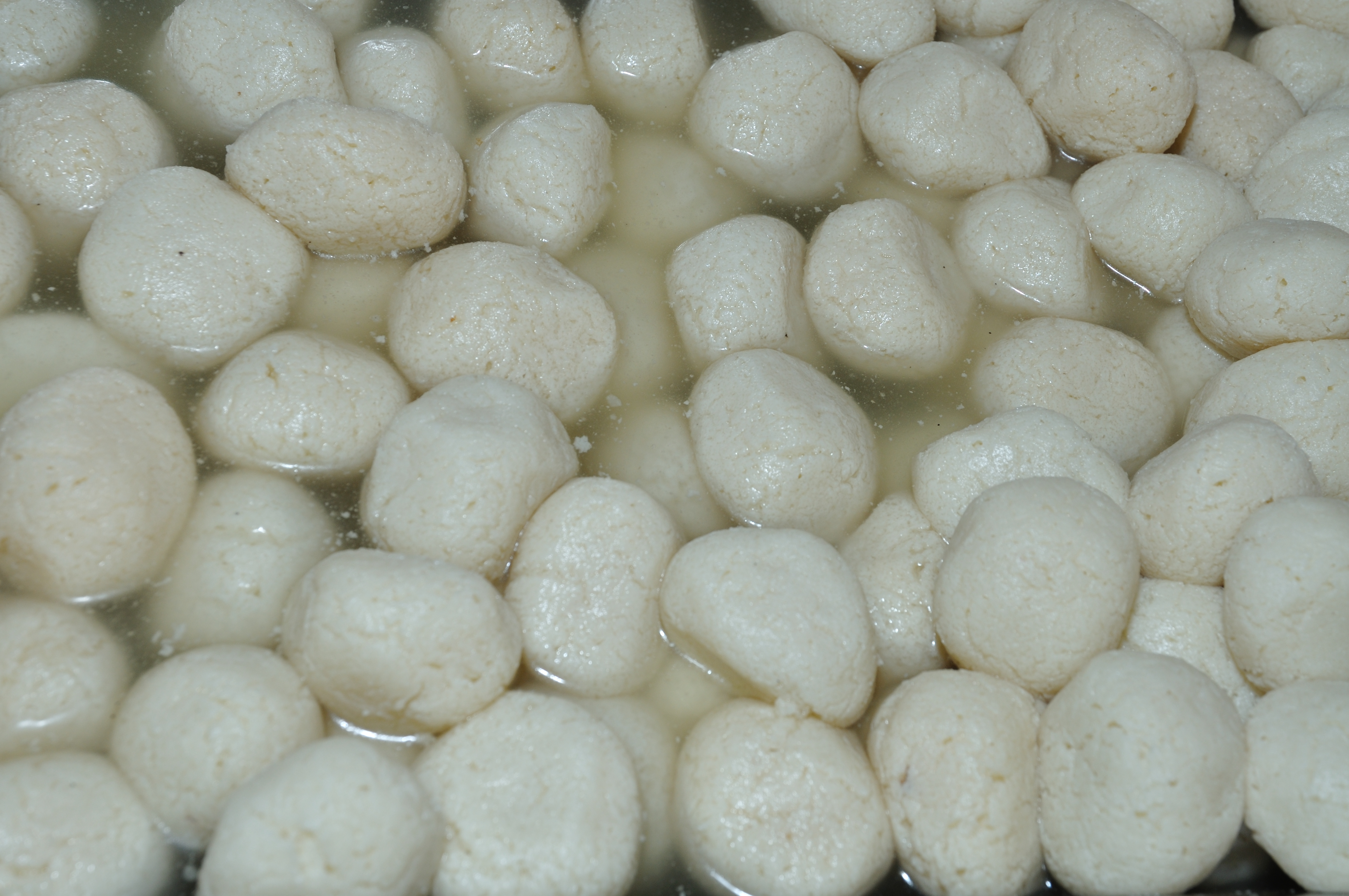
Rajbhog from Kolkata, India

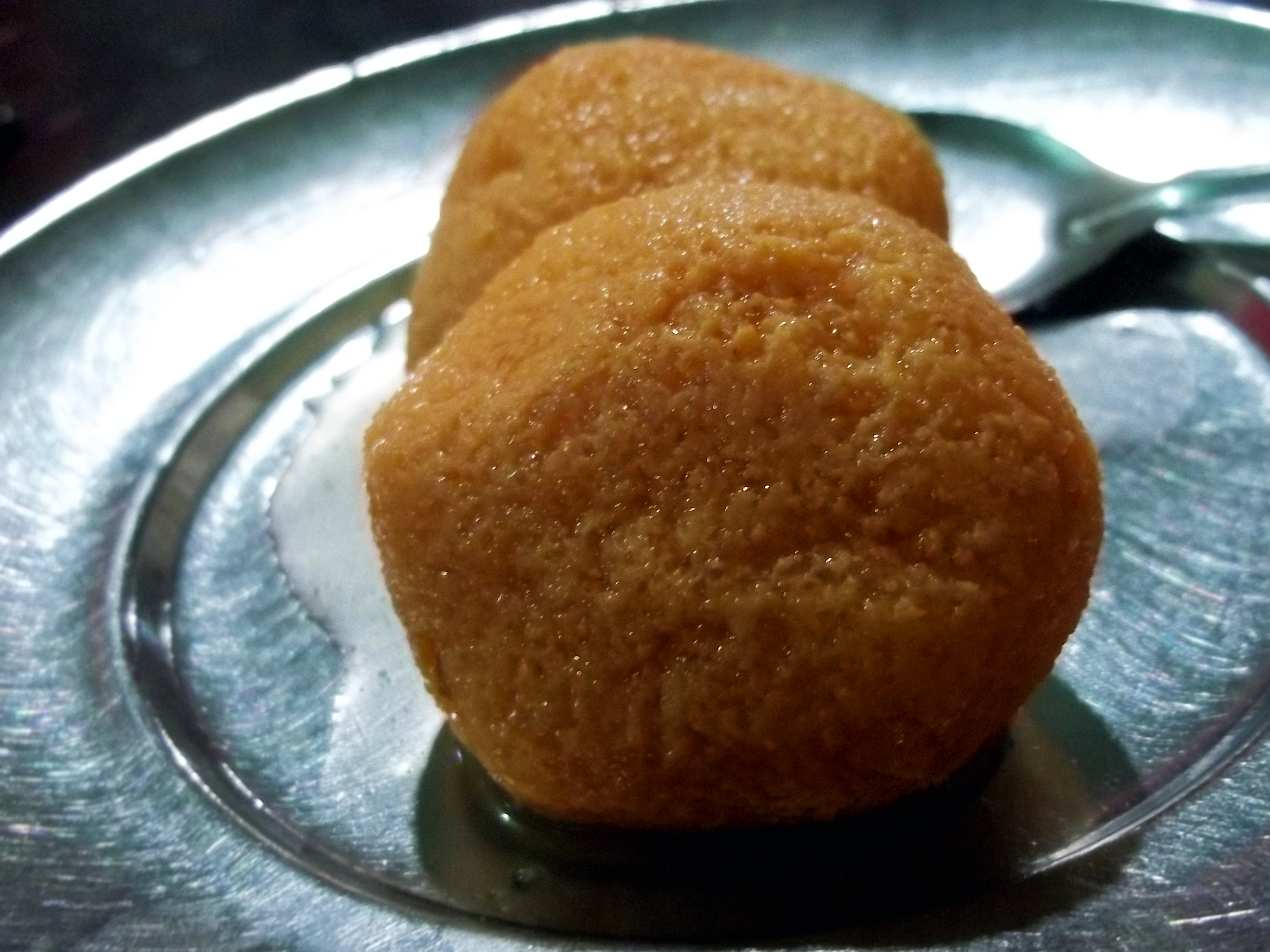
Reddish rasgullas from Pahala, Odisha

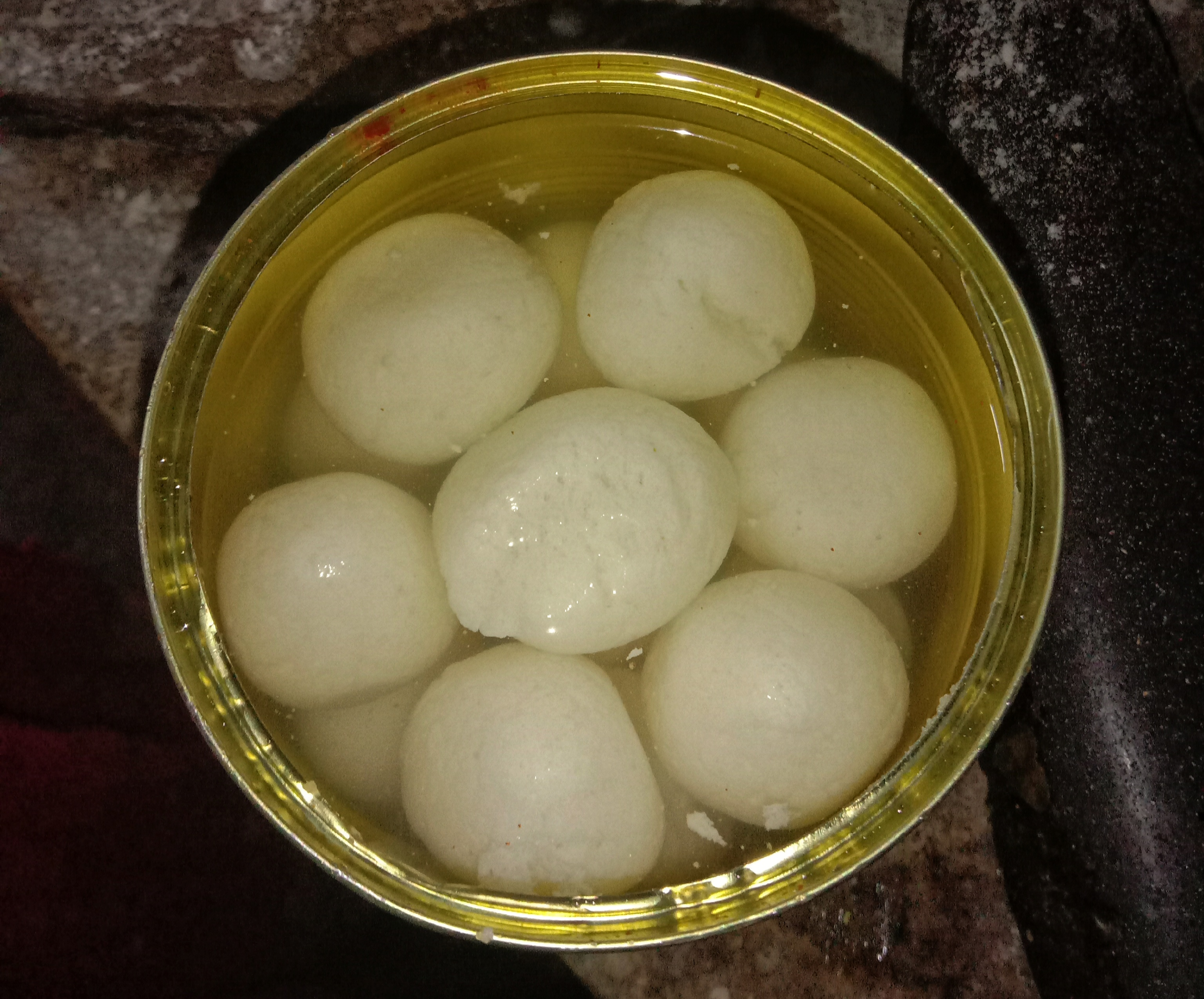
Sponge Rasgulla of Kolkata

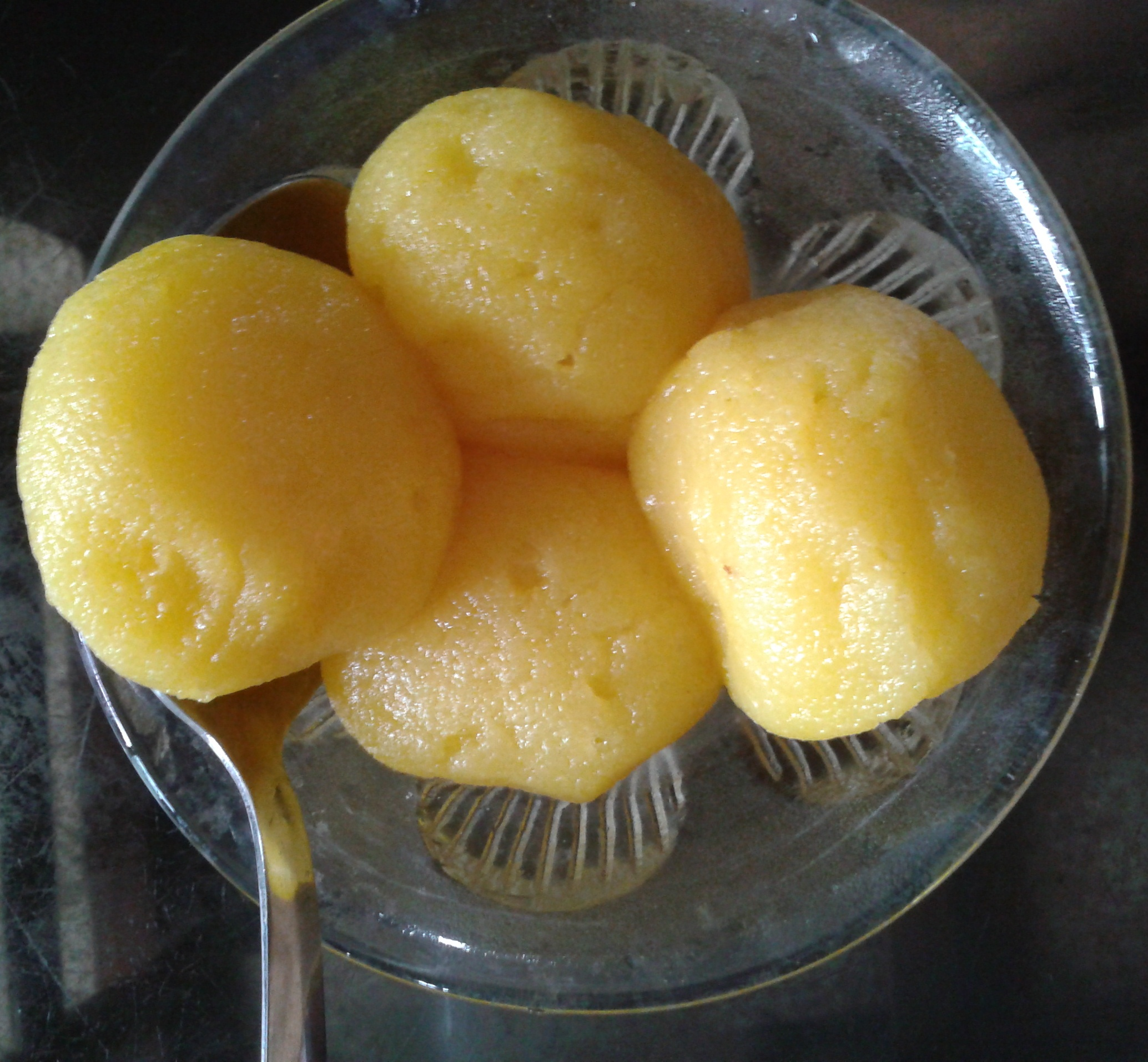
Kamalabhog, an orange-flavoured Bengali rasgulla

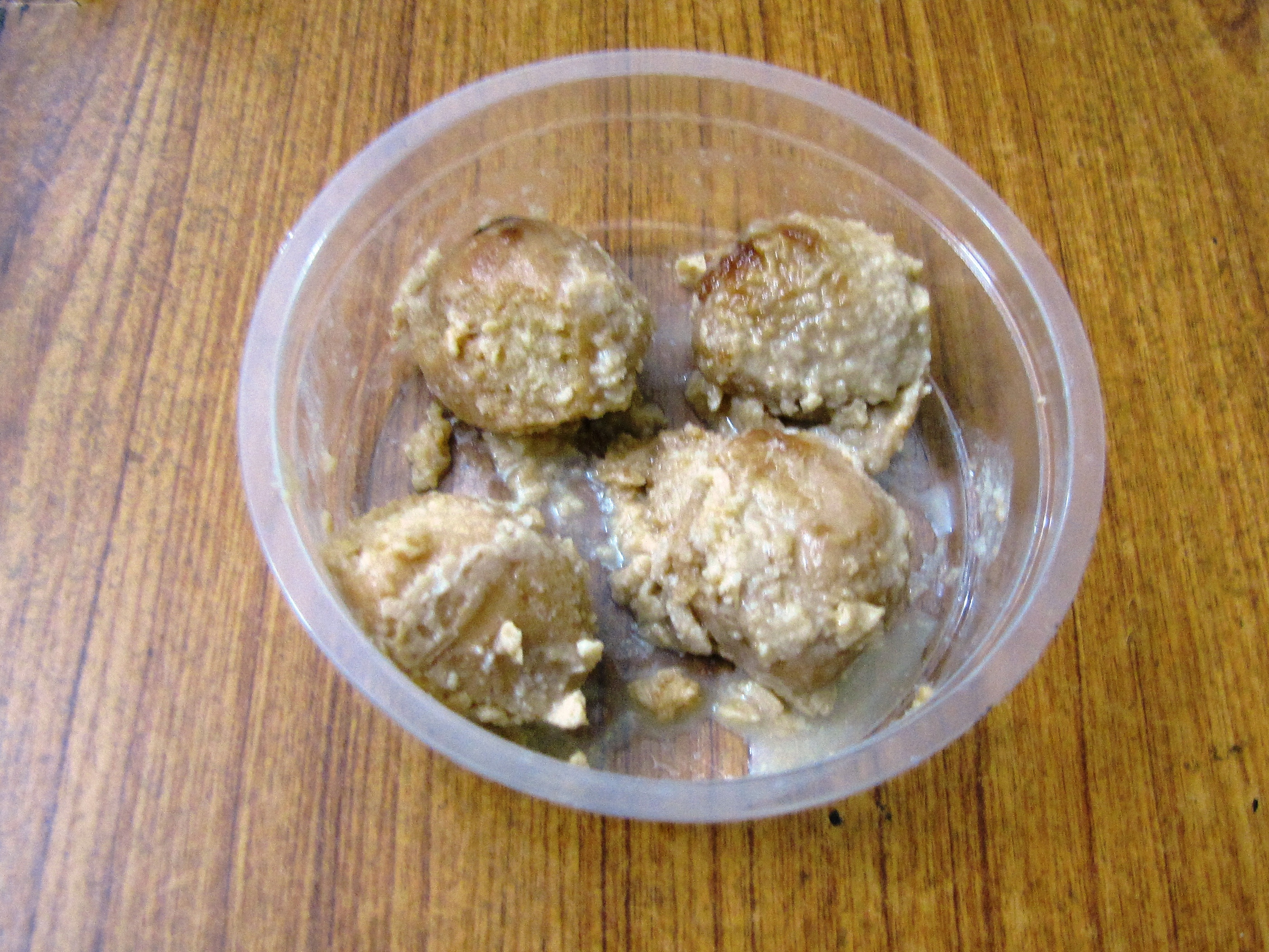
Kolkata's Baked rosogolla – a Bengali variation

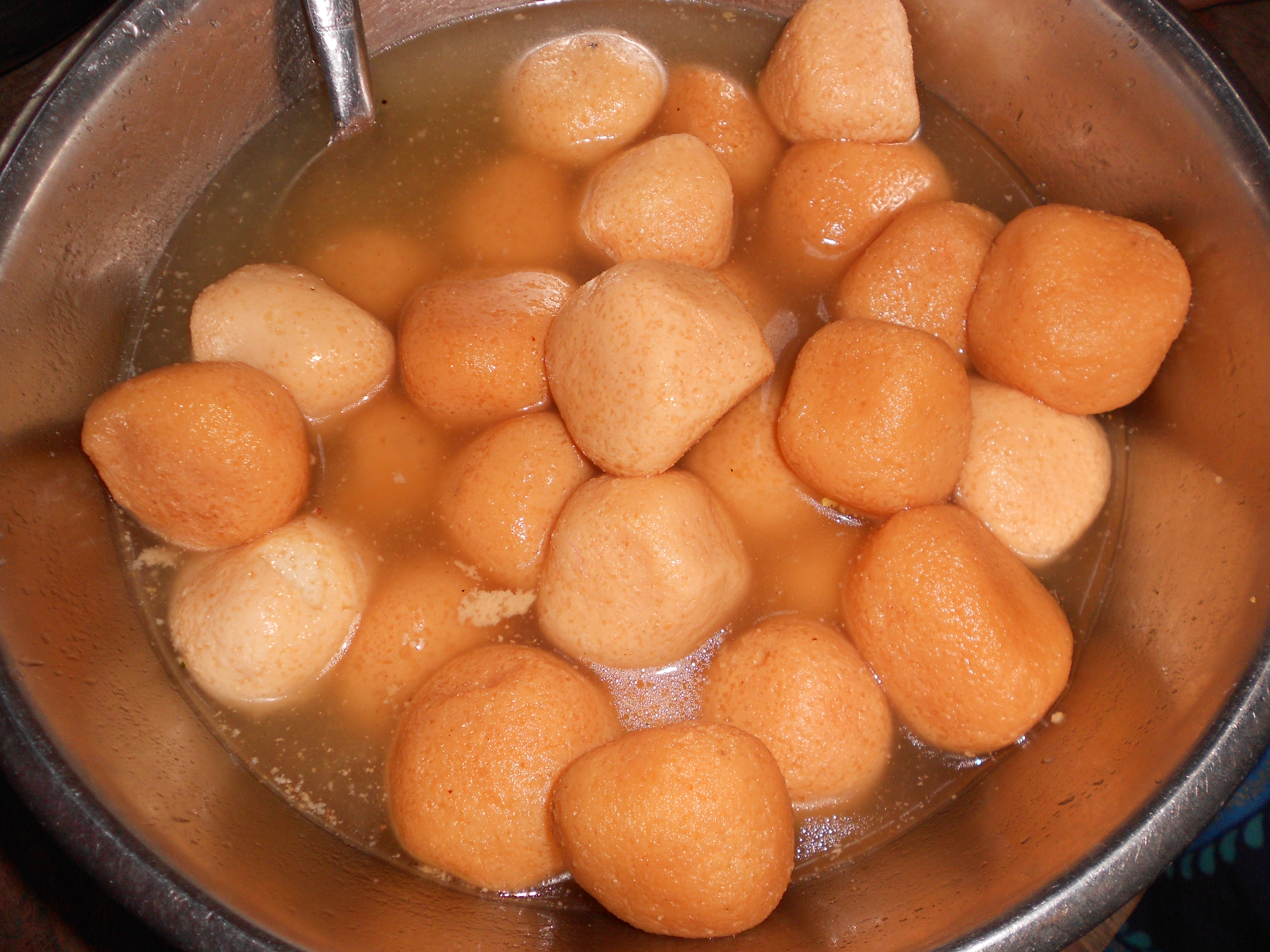
Colored Rasagola from Kalahandi, Odisha

== Nutrition ==
Typically, a 100-gram serving of rasgulla contains 186 kilocalories (780 kJ), out of which about 153 calories come from carbohydrates. It also contains about 1.85 grams of fat and 4 grams of protein.

== Geographical indication (GI) tag ==
In 2015, West Bengal applied for a geographical indication (GI) status for "Banglar Rasogolla" (Bengali Rasgulla). The Government clarified that there was no conflict with Odisha, and its application was only for a specific variant that was different "in colour, texture, taste, juice content and method of manufacturing" from the variant produced in Odisha. On 14 November 2017, the GI Registry of India granted West Bengal the GI status for Banglar Rasogolla.

The GI Registrar office at Chennai later specifically clarified that West Bengal was given GI status only for the Bengali version of rasgulla ("Banglar Rasogolla"), not for the sweet's origin. The office also said that Odisha had not by then applied for a GI tag, but could also get Odisha Rasgulla's GI tag by presenting the necessary evidence.

In 2018, Odisha applied for GI status in the Chennai GI Registry. On 29 July 2019, the GI Registry of India granted Odisha the GI status for "Odisha Rasagola", the Odia version of Rasgulla.

== See also ==
- Rasmalai
- Chomchom
- Bengali cuisine
- Odia cuisine
- Dharwad pedha
- List of Indian sweets and desserts
- Mysore pak
