= Bhagwandas Patel =

Gujarati folklorist

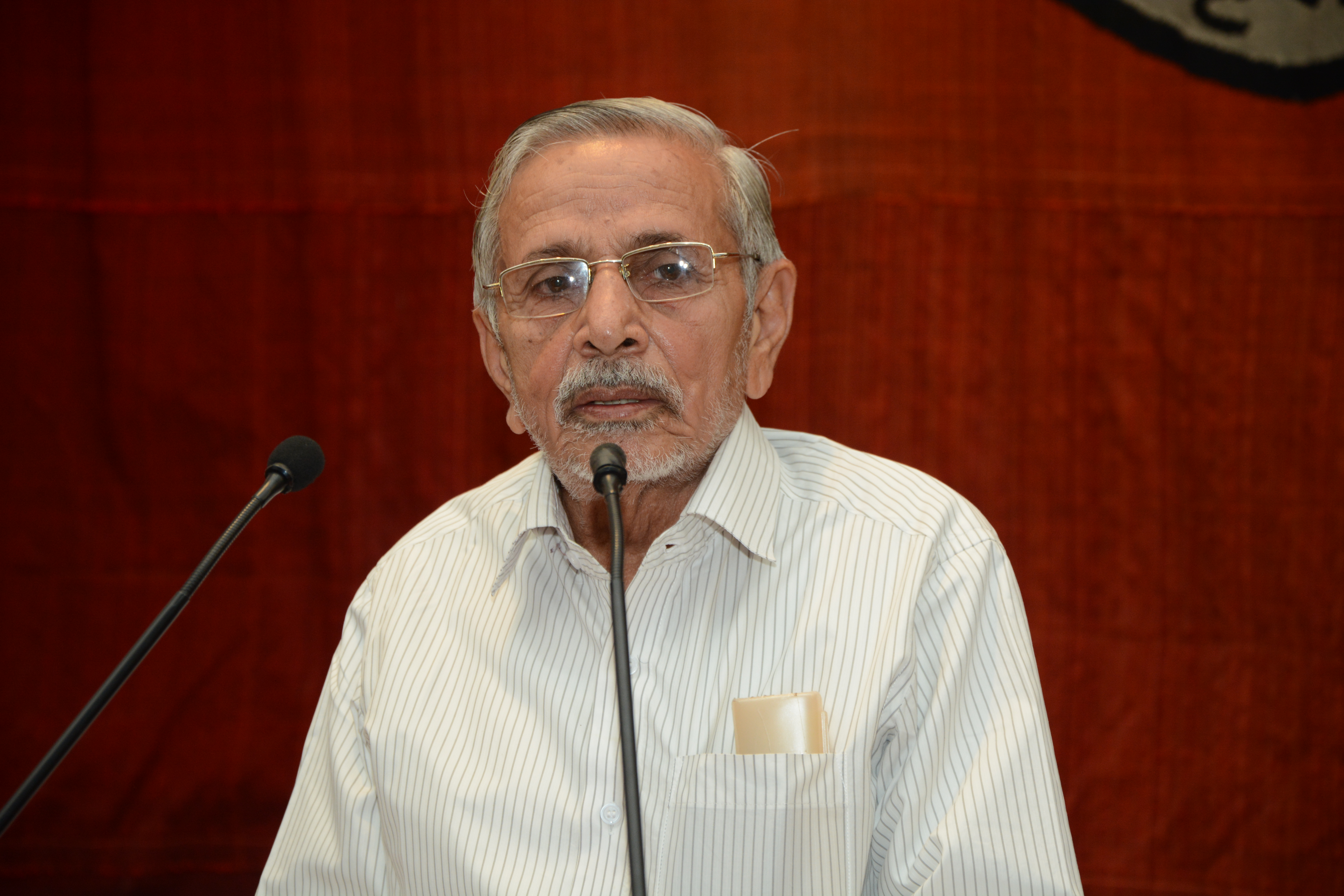
Bhagwandas Patel at Gujarat Vishwakosh Trust, February 2018

Bhagwandas Patel (born 19 November 1943) is an Indian folklorist who pioneered research into Gujarat's tribal literature and brought the state's oral literature to the attention of the literary community. In 1995, he compiled the first published tribal version of the Ramayana, Bhili Lokakhyan: Roam Sitma ni Varatathe, the Ramakatha of the Bhil people.
