= Bhagwant =

Bhagwant may refer to

- Bhagwant Das, ruler of Amber
- Bhagwant Mann, Indian politician and actor
- Bhagwant Nagar, a town in the Unnao district in the state of Uttar Pradesh
- Bhagwant Singh, Jat ruler of Dholpur state
- Bhagwant Singh of Mewar, the titular ruler of the Indian princely state of Udaipur or Mewar
- Bhagwant University, located in Ajmer, Rajasthan, India
