= Khejurer Gur =

Date jaggery originating from Bengal

- Place of origin: Bengal
- Region or state: Bengal and Odisha
- Variations: Patali and Nolen
- Food energy (per 100 g serving): 355 kcal (1,490 kJ)
Nutritional value
(per 100 g serving)
- Protein: 1.69 g
- Fat: g
- Carbohydrate: 87 g

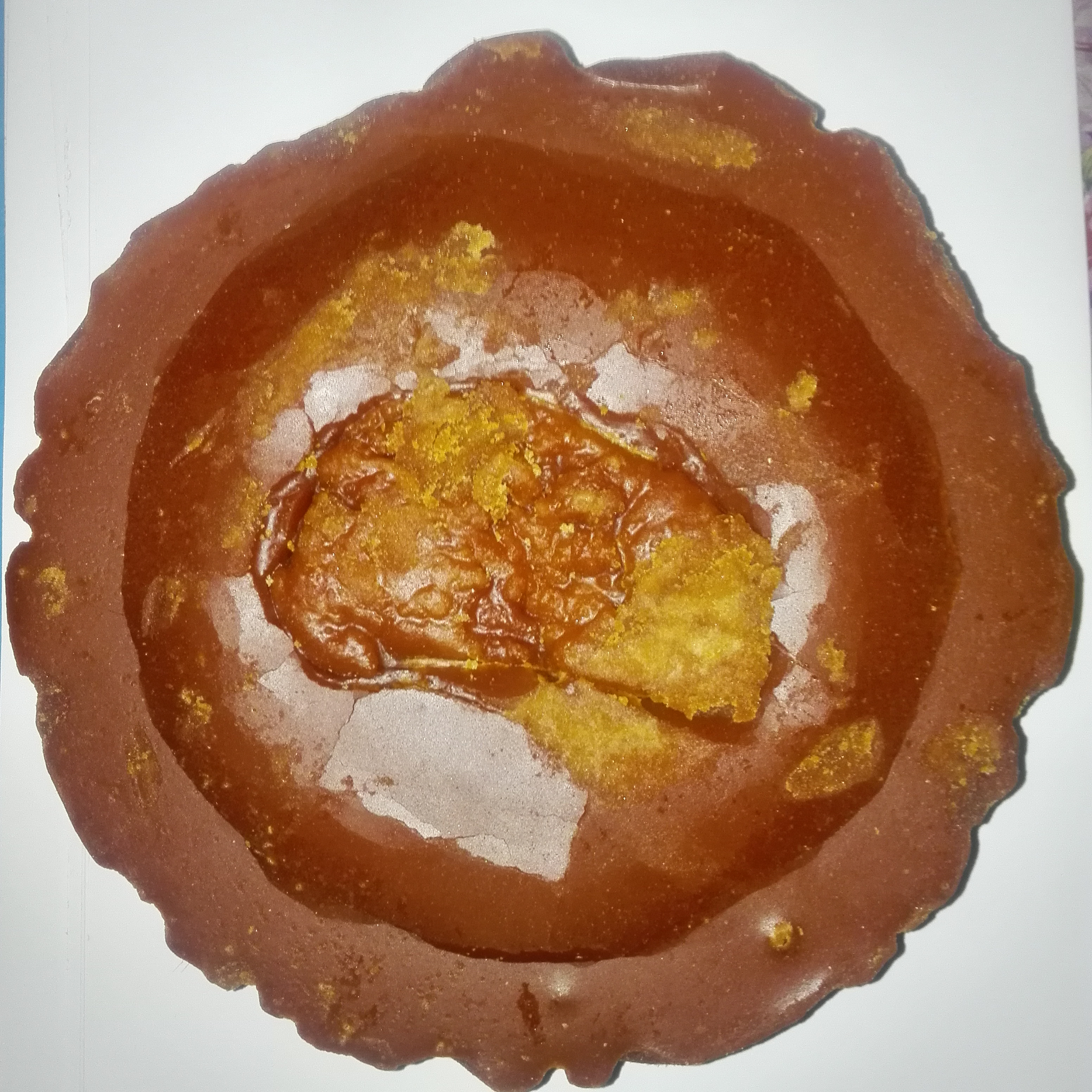
Khejurer Gur in a bowl

Khejurer Gur (Bengali: খেজুরের গুড়, romanized: Khējurēr Guṛ) is a type of palm sugar made from the sweet sap of the date palm. The sap is boiled and concentrated to syrup by evaporation. Khejurer Gur is prepared by cooling the concentrated syrup. Khejurer Gur is available in two forms — Patali (solid) and Nolen or Jhola (liquid). The word "Khejur" generally refers to the date palm while the word "gur" refers to jaggery.

The history of Khejurer Gur production in Bengal is very old. Nolen Gur, a type of Khejurer Gur (or molasses), is mentioned in the Sanskrit Kāvya Sadukti-Karnamrta by Sridhardas. In 1837, the first Khejurer Gur factory was established at Dhoba near Bardwan in West Bengal. West Bengal and Orissa in India and Jessore and Faridpur districts in Bangladesh are famous for producing Khejurer Gur.

Khejurer Gur plays an important role in culinary styles, especially in Bengali cuisine. This type of palm sugar holds significant importance in the preparation of Pitha, which adds a delicious nuttiness and sweetness. Kolkata is famous for its use of Nolen gur in Sandesh and other Mishti.

== History ==
The palm sugar and palm products industry in Bengal dates back to about 4000 years, and is an essential traditional village industry. Sridhardas, son of Sri Bhatudas, the most powerful of Lakshmana Sen's feudal lords (Mahasamantachuramani), is the author of the Sanskrit Kāvya Sadukti-Karnamrta. Historian Niharranjan Roy, in his book History of Bengali Adiparva, mentions that Nolen Gur is described in this Sanskrit poetic text. Besides, he also mentioned that he found mention of dates in Dharmapala's Khalimpur inscription. The Sora people of Odisha also have a history in the preparation of Khejurer Gur

The southern districts of West Bengal and the southwestern districts of Bangladesh are more famous for their Khejurer Gur. Jessore, Faridpur, Undivided Twenty-four Parganas and Nadia district have been famous for gur (jaggery) production for centuries. According to the book History of Jessohar Khulna written by historian Satish Chandra Mitra, 21 lakh 80 thousand 550 maunds of Khejurer Gur were produced in East Bengal in 1900–1901, of which 17 lakh 9 thousand 960 maunds of gur were produced in Jessore alone. The first date palm jaggery and sugar factory was established in 1837 at Dhoba near Burdwan in West Bengal, which was the first industrialization of palm sugar production in India. In 1861, Mr. Newhouse built a factory for the production of date palm jaggery and sugar at Taherpur on the banks of the Kapotaksha River in Chougacha. Later, 117 factories were established in different villages of Jessore.

== Bibliography ==
- Registrar (31 August 2023). "Geographical Indications Journal No 178". Geographical Indications Journal. Intellectual Property India.
