= Sandesh (confectionery) =

Bengali confectionery

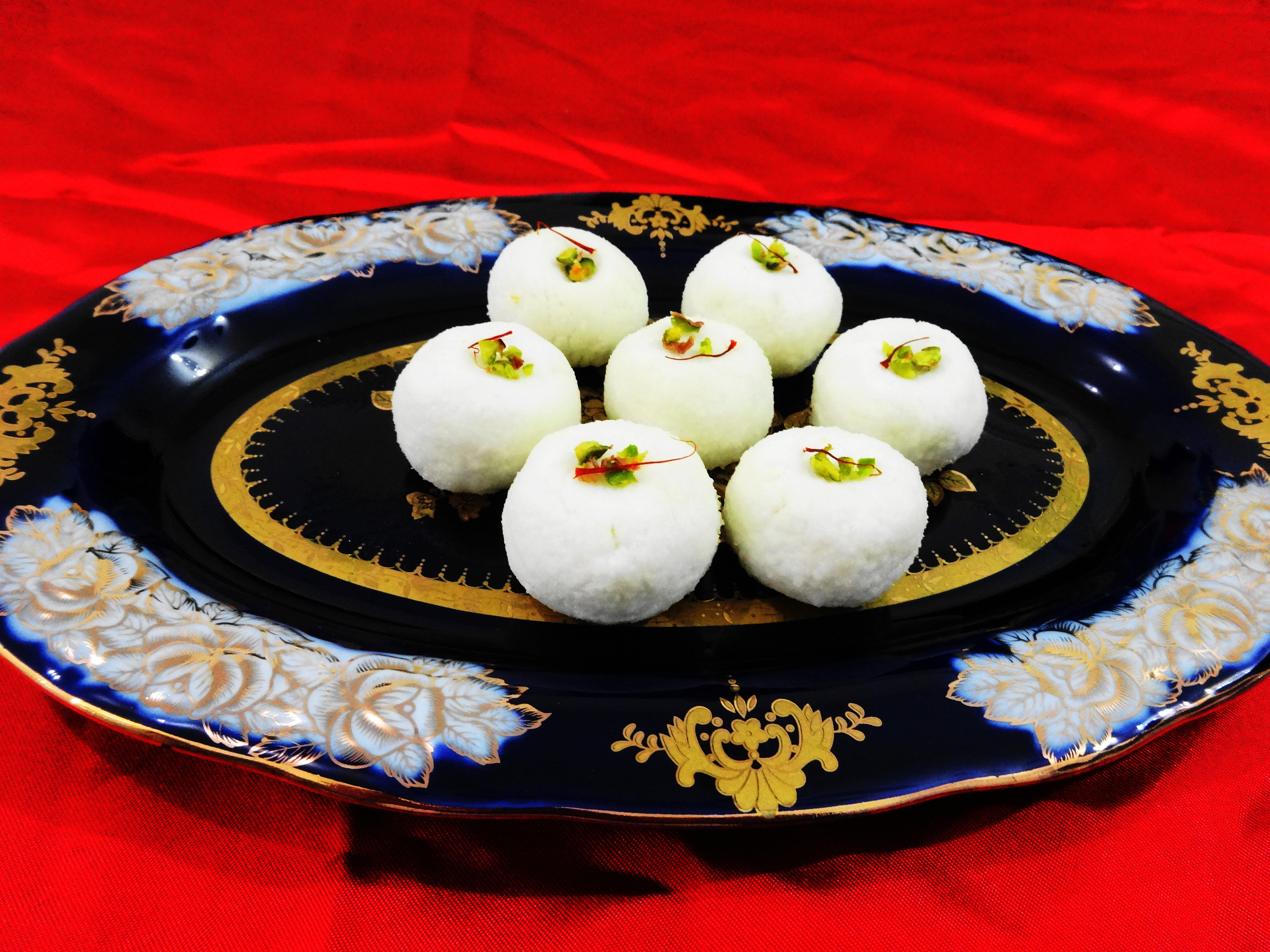
- Sandesh, created with milk and sugar
- Course: Dessert
- Place of origin: Bengal
- Region or state: Kolkata, Guptipara, Chandannagar, Basirhat, Dhaka, Natore (part of the Bengal region of the Indian subcontinent)
- Associated cuisine: Bangladesh, India
- Main ingredients: Chhena, sugar, jaggery (gur), condensed milk
- Variations: Nolen guṛer sondesh, norom pak sondesh, koṛa pak sondesh, Jolbhora Sandesh, various flavourings

Sandesh (Bengali: সন্দেশ Shôndesh) is a Bengali dessert, originating from the undivided Bengal region in the eastern part of the Indian subcontinent, created with milk and sugar. Some recipes of sandesh call for the use of chhena or paneer (which is made by curdling the milk and separating the whey from it) instead of milk itself. Some people in the region of Dhaka make a variety of sandesh called pranahara (literally 'heart stealer') which is softer and made with mawa and yogurt. Basirhat is known for its kachagolla sandesh. Historically, it can be seen that the culture of making this kachagolla in Basirhat is about 400 years old. The Gupo or Gufo style of sandesh from Guptipara is considered by some to be the "first branded sweet of Bengal".

== History ==
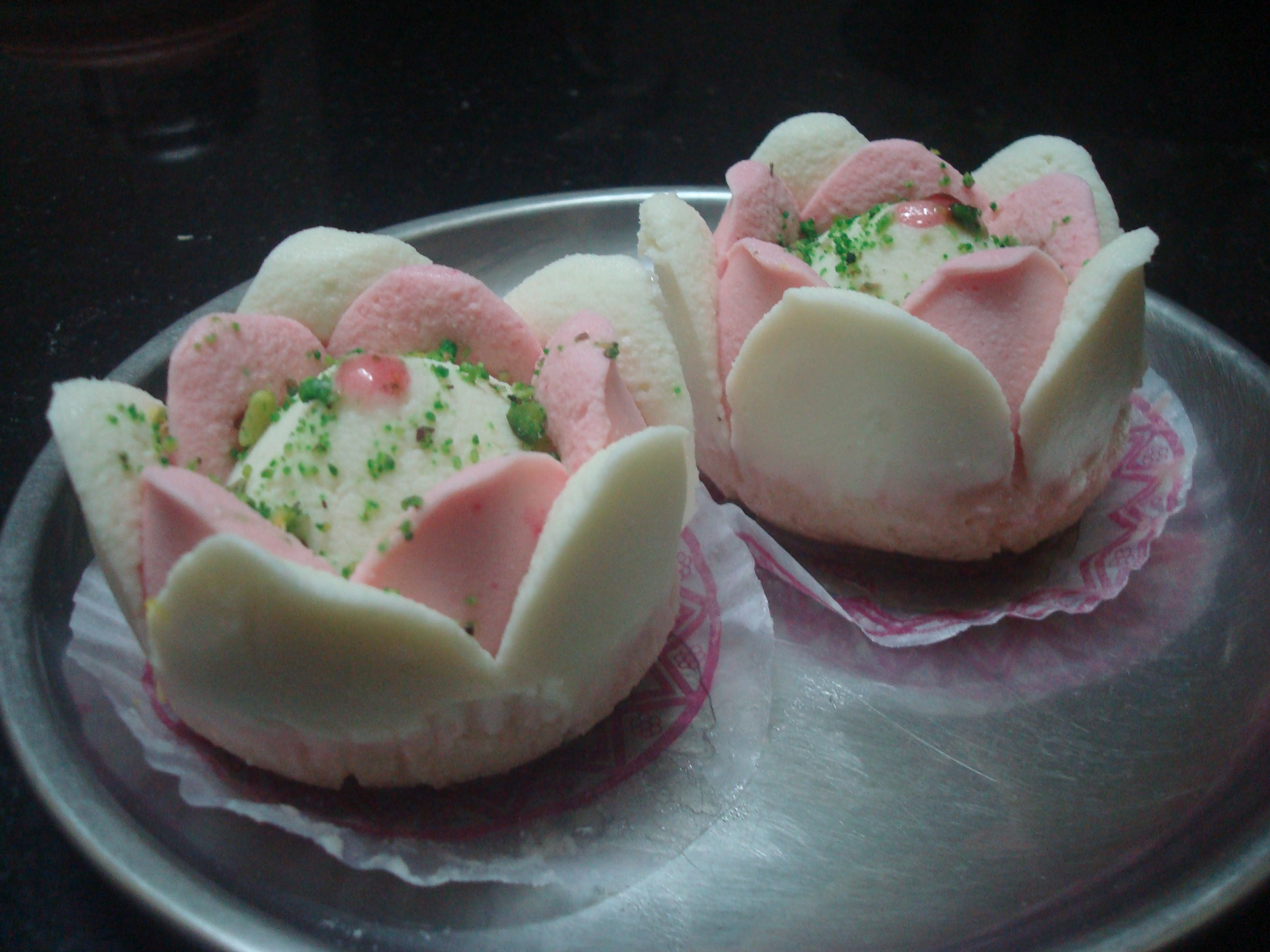
Sandesh from Bengal

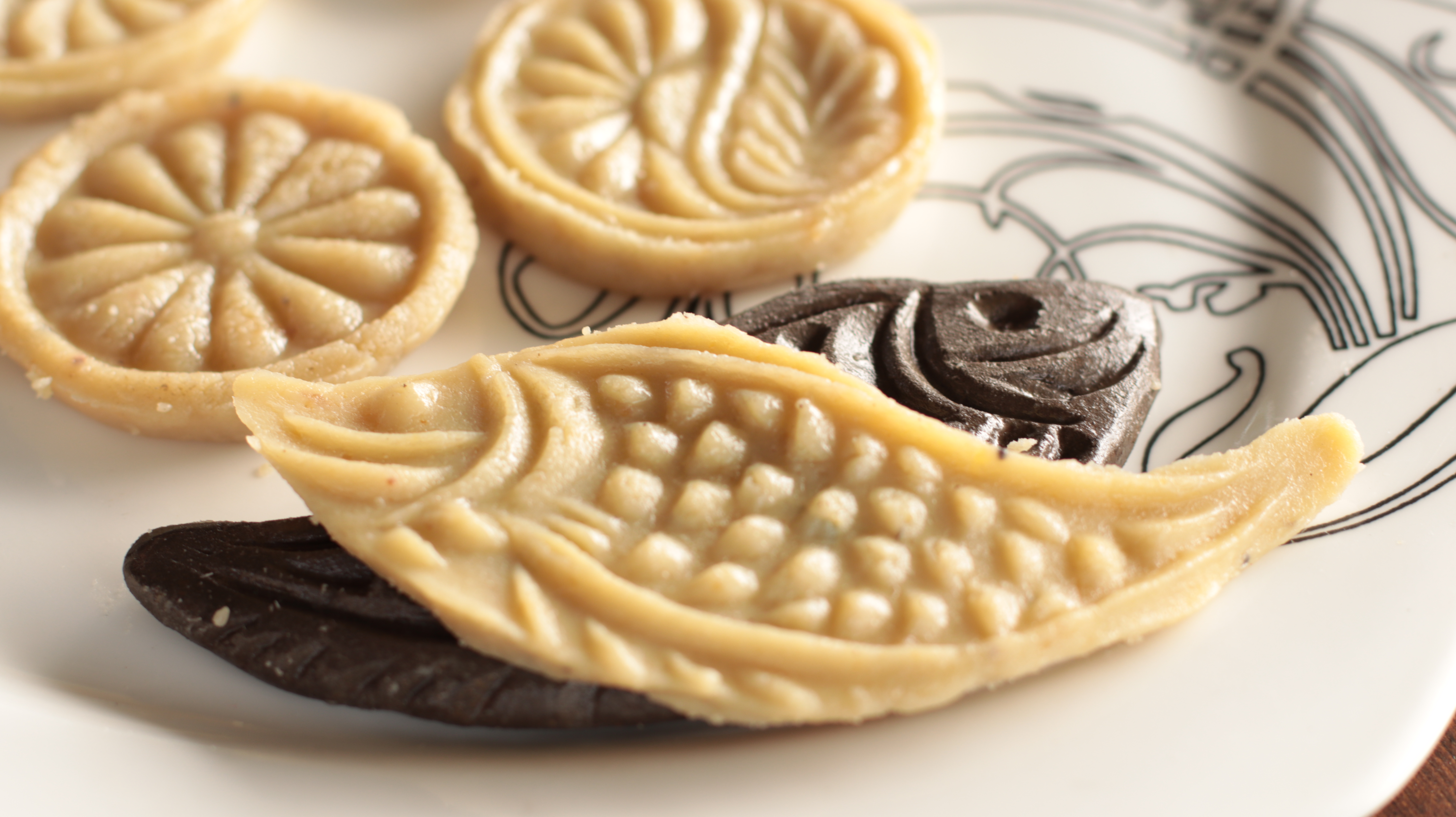
Sandesh sweets shaped into decorative designs

A sweet dish by the name sandesh is mentioned in medieval Bengali literature, including Krittivasi Ramayana and lyrics of Chaitanya Mahaprabhu. However, the ingredients of this original dish are not known. This dish was most likely made of solidified kheer, and thus different from the modern chhena-based sandesh.

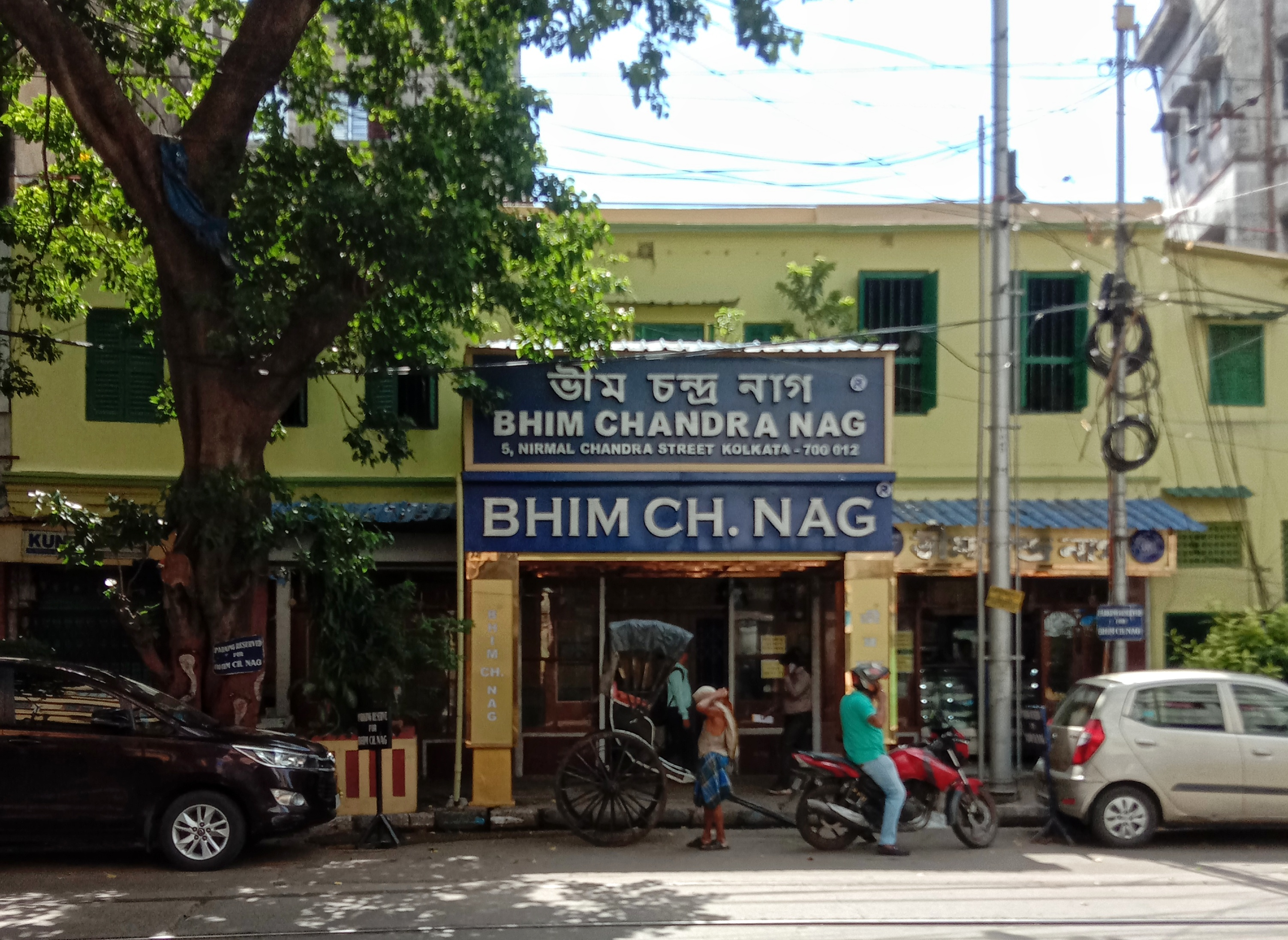
Bhim Chandra Nag, one of the most popular sweet shops in Kolkata, home of sandesh, was set up by Paran Chandra Nag in 1826 at Bowbazar.

It is hard to determine when exactly sandesh started referring mainly to the chhena-based sweet instead of the kheer-based sweet. However, it is known that by the second half of the 19th century, sandesh commonly referred to the chhena-based sweet.

== Preparation ==
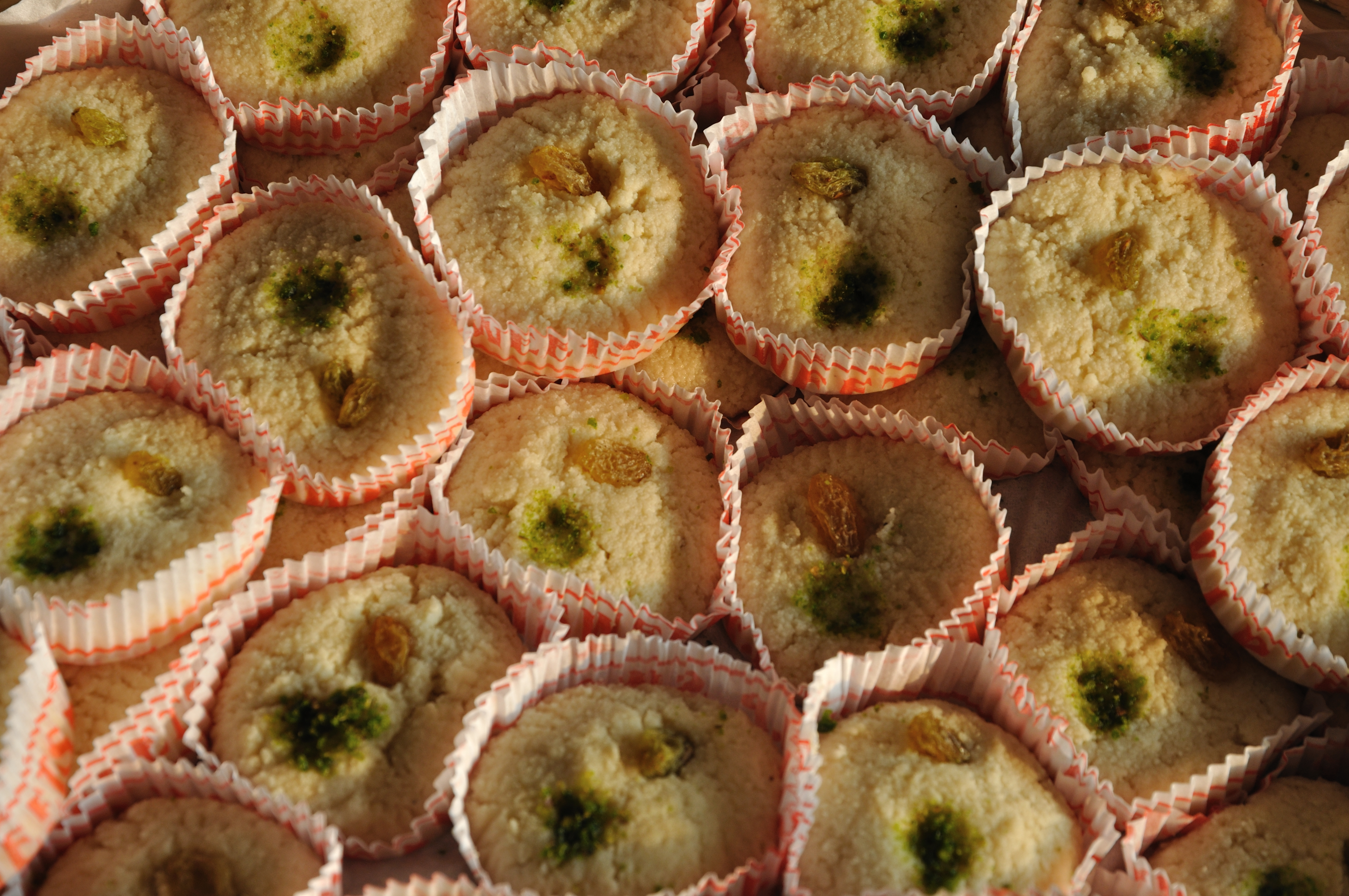
A typical Bengali sandesh

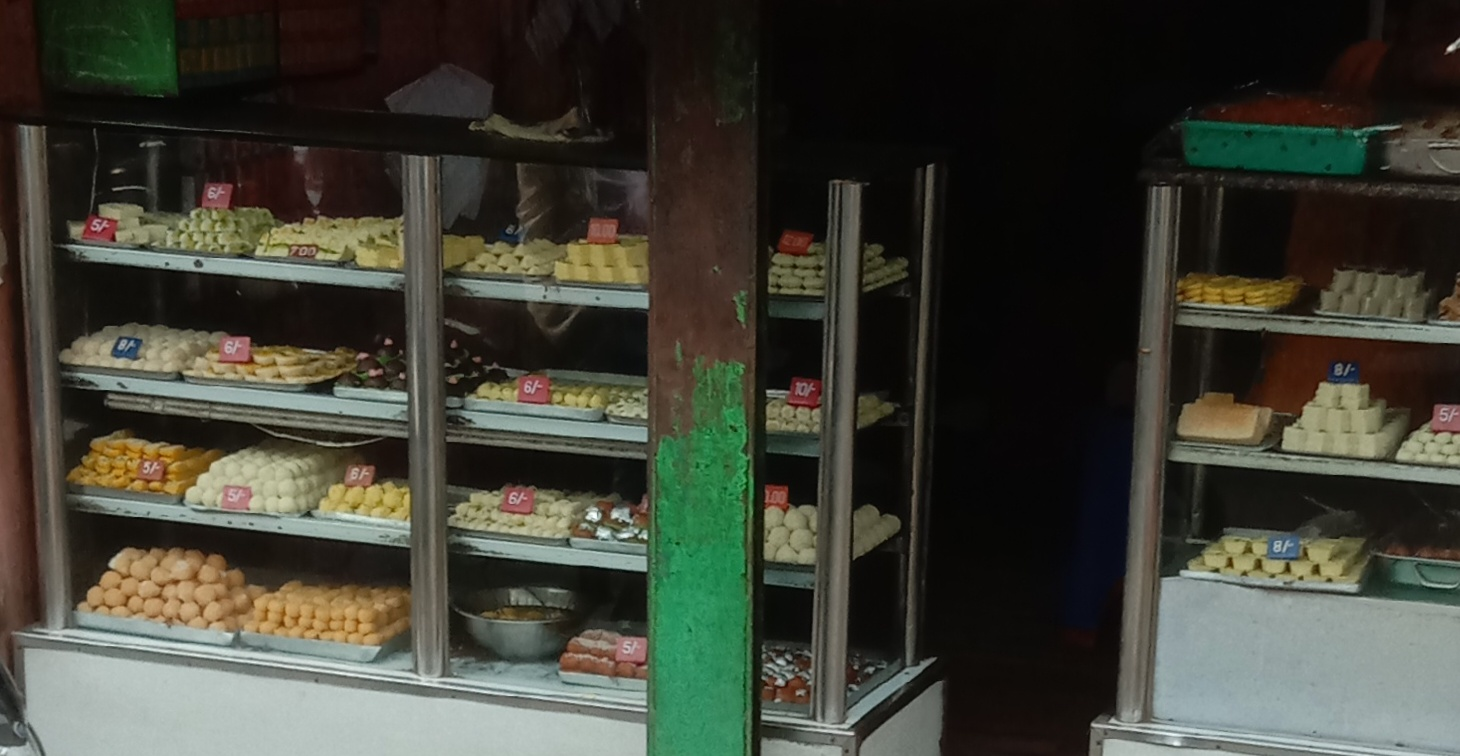
Sandesh and other sweets at a shop in Howrah, West Bengal.

Sandesh can be made with the use of chhena or paneer. The simplest kind of sandesh in Bengal is the makha sandesh (makha, meaning 'kneaded'). It is prepared by tossing the chhena lightly with sugar over low heat. When shaped into balls, it is called Kanchagolla (kancha, meaning 'raw' and golla, meaning 'ball'). For more complex and elaborately prepared sandesh, the chhena is dried and pressed, flavoured with fruit, and sometimes even coloured, and cooked to many different consistencies. Specific sandesh moulds are available which can create various intricate design impressions. Sometimes, it is moulded into the shape of an ice apple (talsash in bengali) and filled with syrup, it is called Jolbhora Sandesh. It may also blended with coconut or kheer, and moulded into a variety of shapes such as conch shells, elephants, and fish. Another variant is nolen gurer sandesh, which is made with gur or jaggery. It is known for its brown or caramel colour that comes from nolen gur.
