= Prem Prakash Modi =

Indian film director and actor

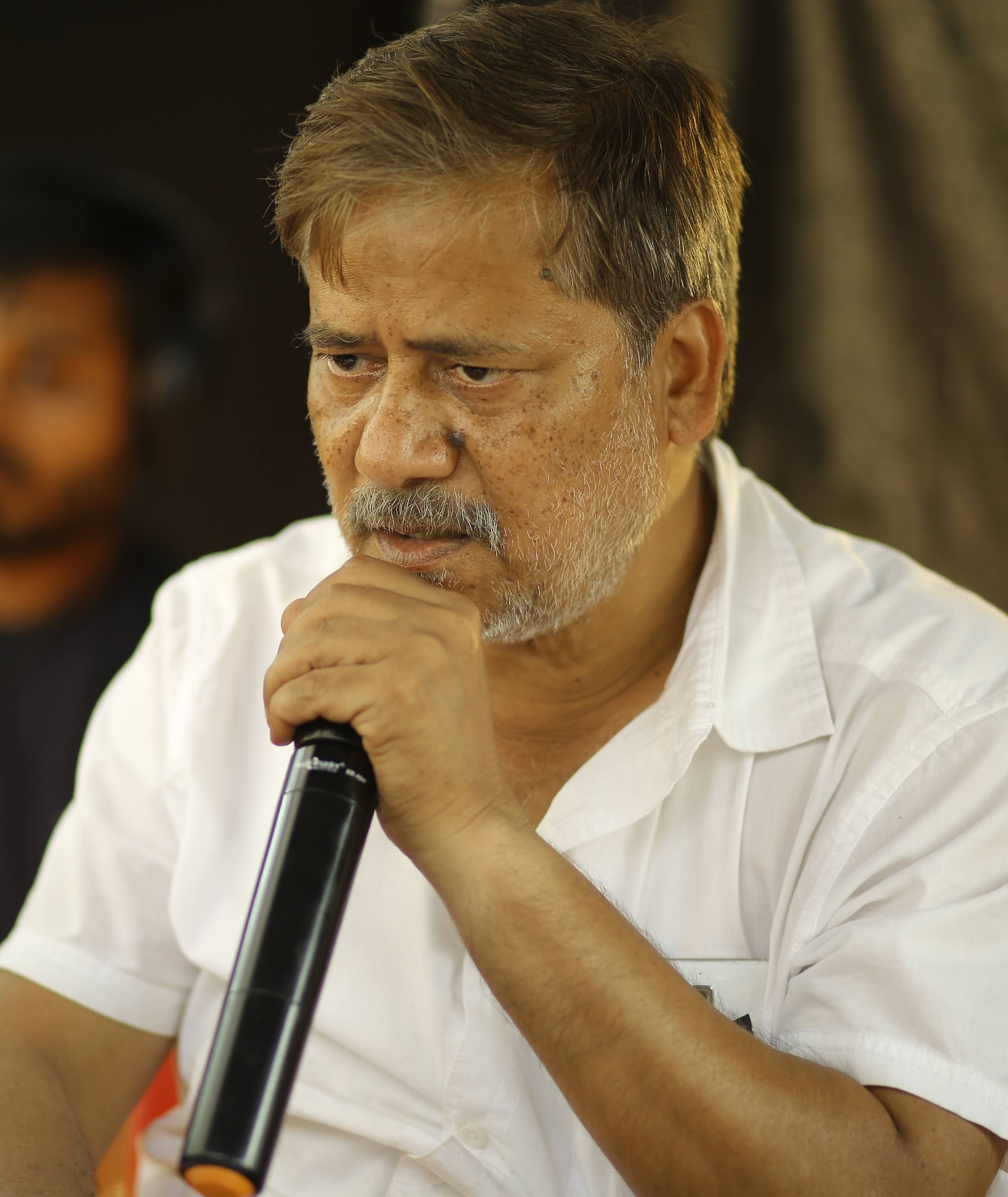
- (2017)
- Born: 17 July 1968 (age 58); Nunihat, Jharkhand, India
- Occupations: Film director, Screenwriter, Actor
- Years active: 1997 - Present

Prem Prakash Modi (born 17 July 1968) is an Indian filmmaker, writer, producer and actor known for his works in Hindi & Bengali cinema. He made his debut as a director in 2013 with the Bengali feature film Arjun – Kalimpong E Sitaharan starring Sabyasachi Chakrabarty, Om, Manoj Mitra and Churni Ganguly, based on Samaresh Majumdar's novel Khunkharapi and Kalimpong e Sitaharan. His next directorial venture was Panchlait (2017), which was well received by the audience. He has worked as an Associate for noted directors such as Aparna Sen, Gul Bahar Singh, Anjan Dutt, Anjan Das, Suman Mukhopadhyay.

== Career ==
Prem began his career as a chief assistant director for The Goal, a Children's Film Society (CFSI) production which starred Irrfan Khan and directed by Gul Bahar Singh. The film won the Best Children's Film at 47th National Film Awards, Special International Jury Prize at Cairo International Film Festival and Special Mention at International Federation of Film Societies in the Czech Republic.

Prem wrote the story and lyrics for the film Sixer a CFSI production starring Amrish Puri, directed by Gul Bahar Singh. Later, he wrote dialogues for the film Antarmahal, directed by Rituparno Ghosh.

His directorial debut was with Arjun – Kalimpong E Sitaharan starring Sabyasachi Chakrabarty, Om, Manoj Mitra and Churni Ganguly. His next release was Panchlait, based on Phanishwar Nath Renu's short story starring Amitosh Nagpal, Anuradha Mukherjee, Yashpal Sharma, Rajesh Sharma, Ravi Jhankal and Brijendra Kala in lead roles. The film received acclaim from both audiences and was featured in prestigious film festivals, including the International Film Festival of India. He also co-produced a Hindi feature film Ateet starring Rajeev Khandelwal, Priyamani and Sanjay Suri, for ZEE5.

== Filmography ==
Year	Title	Language	Director	Writer	Producer	Actor	Other	Notes
1995	Daughters of this Century	Hindi				Yes		
2013	Arjun – Kalimpong E Sitaharan	Bengali	Yes					
2017	Panchlait	Hindi	Yes					Released on 17 November
2020	Ateet	Hindi			Yes			Released on ZEE5
2021	Aadhaar	Hindi				Yes	TBA	

== Television ==
Title	Language	Role	Channel
Shesh Prasna	Hindi	Actor	Doordarshan
Lebedev Ki Nayika	Hindi	Actor	Doordarshan
Prem Chand Ki Kahaniya	Hindi	Actor	Doordarshan
Shikanje	Hindi	Actor	Doordarshan
Sahib Biwi Aur Ghulam	Hindi	Actor	Sahara One
Shayad	Hindi	Actor	Zee TV
Chorri Chupe	Hindi	Actor	Doordarshan
Mukti	Hindi	Director	Doordarshan
Superhit Jhankar	Bengali	Director	Doordarshan
Siddhant	Bengali	Actor	Doordarshan
Saturday Suspense	Hindi	Actor	Zee TV
