= Juloos =

1966 novel by Phanishwar Nath Renu

- Author: Phanishwar Nath Renu
- Language: Hindi
- Genre: Novel
- Publisher: Bharatiya Jnanpith
- Publication date: 1966
- Publication place: India
- Dewey Decimal: 891.433
- LC Class: PK2098.R45 J8

Juloos is a novel by acclaimed Hindi writer Phanishwar Nath Renu. It was first published by Bharatiya Jnanpith in 1966. Juloos is a novel based on the change in the social paradigm of Goriyar village in Bihar when a group of Bengali Hindus arrive from East Pakistan to live in a colony. This novel is also written in the Anchalik style for which the author is famous.

== Characters ==
The main protagonist in the story are:

- Pavitra, a bramhin girl who lost her parents and fiancée in the riots and unofficially heads the colony
- Talewar Godhi, the richest man in the village who is from the godhi community and knows about tantra. He is also fond of women and has illicit relationship with them on the pretext of tantric practices.
- Jairam Singh is the disciple of Talewar Godhi.

Apart from these, there are other main characters who represent different facets of village life in post independence Bihar.

== Plot ==
After riots in East Pakistan the Bengali Hindus of the Jumapur village run away to arrive in the Goryiar village in the Indian state of Bihar. Like most of the villages, Goriyar has its own set of caste divisions and in the novel the most economically progressive caste in the village is that of the Godhis. Initially the colony formed by the migratory people is scorned upon by the villagers. It is only after news of the fair Bengali lady Pavitra with long flowing hairs reach the ears of Talewar Godhi, the unofficial head of the village and its richest man, that he starts taking interest in the colony. He sends his disciple Jairam Singh to sprinkle tantric sand near the feat of the lady, so that she would automatically be attracted to him. As the contacts between the people of the colony and the village increases many new relationship are formed and older ones broken. The novel which runs in 135 pages portrays with subtlety the colorful and dark facets of the village life with a presence of gamut of interesting characters.

== See also ==
- Phanishwar Nath Renu
- Maila Anchal
- Parti Parikatha
