= Animesh =

Animesh is an Indic given name. The following notable people have the given name:

- Animesh Aich, Bangladeshi film maker, actor, director and writer.
- Animesh Ray, professor of computational and molecular biology
- Animesh Debbarma, the leader of the National Conference of Tripura party
- Animesh Chakravorty, Bengali Indian academic and a professor of chemistry.

Animesh may also refer to:

- Animesh quartet, novel series by Samaresh Majumdar whose principal character is Animesh Mitra
