= Churni Ganguly =

Indian Bengali actress

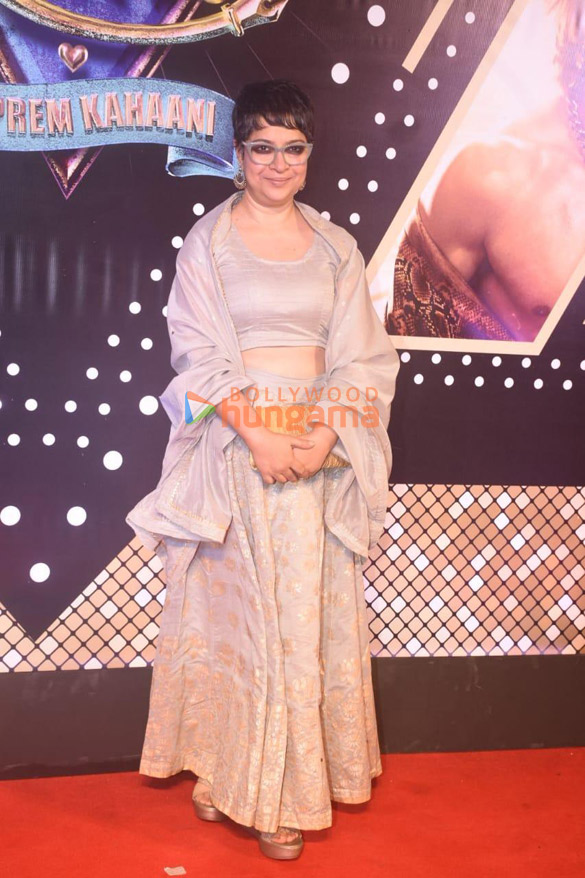
- Ganguly at the premiere of Rocky Aur Rani Kii Prem Kahaani (2023)
- Born: Churni Banerjee; 14 November; Kolkata, India
- Occupations: Actress, Director, Writer
- Spouse: Kaushik Ganguly (m. 1993)
- Children: Ujaan Ganguly (son)
- Relatives: Sunil Ganguly (father-in-law)

Churni Ganguly (née Banerjee) is an Indian actress and writer-director who mainly works in Bengali movies and television productions. She won the prestigious Onida Pinnacle Award for Best Actress [National Level] in 1995. Churni received the Bengal Film Journalists' Association Awards in 2005 in the best actress category for the movie Waarish, in which she played a single-mother's role. As a writer-director, she won two National Film Awards for Nirbashito and Tarikh. At the 7th Filmfare Awards Bangla, she won the Filmfare Award Bangla for Best Actress for her performance in the drama film Ardhangini.

After spending her childhood in Kurseong, Churni came to Kolkata and got admitted at the Jadavpur University. While studying English at Jadavpur University, she joined a theatre group as an actress. Then she moved to Mumbai and acted in a few television serials for Balaji Motion Pictures. Later, she returned to Kolkata and started working in Bengali films.

== Personal life ==
Churni Ganguly (née Banerjee) was born on 14 November spent her childhood in Kurseong. Her parents, Sudipta Banerjee and Ardhendu Banerjee, were school teachers. She was a student of Dow Hill School. In spite of being at boarding school, Churni and few other girls were allowed to stay at their homes with their parents. Churni's father, whom Churni described as "extremely caring, but a rather serious person" encouraged Churni to do well in studies, and especially sports. But Churni did not feel the urge to concentrate on sports. Churni was a good student at school, but she never thought that she had to secure rankings in examinations.

Churni was a top student of Jadavpur University when she became a part of Aurat. In 1987, she started a theatre troupe with Suman Mukhopadhyay and her future husband, National Award-winning filmmaker Kaushik Ganguly. Kaushik and Churni got married in January 1993. They have a son – actor Ujaan Ganguly.

== Career in Mumbai ==
Churni arrived as a fresh face in the Hindi film and television industry. She shifted to Mumbai and acted in Zee TV's first daily soap, Raahat and stayed there for the next two years. In those days, when she was in her twenties, she acted in Choti si Asha, in which she played a 35-year-old mother's character who matured to about 60. Despite success and accolades, she decided to come back to Kolkata.

== Career in Bengali film industry ==
Since moving to Kolkata, Churni has been working in the Bengali film industry.

=== 2004—2005 ===
In 2004, Ganguly made her debut in Bengali cinema with the film Waarish. The film was directed by Kaushik Ganguly. In the film, she played the role of a single mother— Medha. Medha was an ex-flame of Subhankar, who became pregnant after a rendezvous with him. Though Medha was not married with Subhankar, she denied abortion and gave birth to a son, Megh. Many years later, when she learns that she is suffering from cancer, she goes to Subhankar, (who was married to another woman at that time) and asks to take responsibility of Megh. Though the acting of Ganguly in this film was widely appreciated, it did not get commercial success.

In 2005, Ganguly acted in the film Shunyo E Buke, directed by Kaushik Ganguly. In this film, she portrayed a flat-chested woman's role and the film attempted to explore male sexual fantasy.

=== 2007—2010 ===
In 2007, Ganguly acted in Jara Bristite Bhijechhilo, directed by Anjan Das. The film revolved around lesbian relationships.

In 2008, Ganguly acted in Anjan Dutt's Chalo Let's Go. This was Ganguly's first feature film in which she acted under the direction of someone other than Kaushik Ganguly. The film was a travelogue and narrated a story of a journey with nine passengers. Ganguly played the character of Miss Ganguly, a sophisticated writer. But in the film, her fellow passengers used to call her "Miss Gombhir".

In the 2010 film Arekti Premer Golpo, Ganguly played the character of Rani/Gopa. In this film, Rituparno Ghosh and Indraneil Sengupta acted in lead roles and the film revolved around a homosexual relationship.

=== 2011—present ===
My character Kamalini has a lot of attitude and is always in charge. I am more laid-back. Our spouses are freelancers, that's one similarity... so we've both had to work on certain projects just to run the show. We're both disarmingly truthful. And we're both vulnerable... but then, who isn't?

— Churni Ganguly on her character Kamalini in Rang Milanti

In 2011, Ganguly acted in Rang Milanti, another film directed by Kaushik Ganguly. In this film, she played the role of Kamalini, a successful Television actor.

In 2012, Ganguly acted in two Bengali movies— Laptop, directed by Kaushik Ganguly and Arjun – Kalimpong E Sitaharan, directed by Prem Modi. The film Laptop told some stories related to some different people, connected by one single laptop. On the other hand, Arjun – Kalimpong E Sitaharan was a detective film based on Samaresh Majumdar's literary character Arjun.

The 2013 film Shabdo, directed by Kaushik Ganguly, was widely appreciated by critics and is remains as a landmark film. The story of the film revolved around Tarak, a Foley artist of Bengali film industry. In this film, Ganguly played the role of Tarak's psychiatrist.

Ganguly signed Kaushik Ganguly's C/O Sir for the role of Mrs Chatterjee. Later, as she was having problem with dates, she was replaced by another actress Sudipta Chakraborty.

She also acted in Bakita Byaktigato, directed by Pradipta Bhattacharya. This film shot like a documentary, the film traces a man's quest for love as per critics review. Pramit, an amateur documentary filmmaker, is tired of girls rejecting his propositions. Prem ki? Ki kore prem hoye? Troubled by such questions, he takes it upon himself to solve the puzzle anyhow. And this time around, he plans to make a documentary film on love.

Actor Churni Ganguly debuts as a director in Nirbashito, a bilingual film in Bengali and English, shot in Kolkata and Sweden. After many snuffed-out attempts by several filmmakers, for the first time a film on Taslima Nasrin's life was released at the ongoing Mumbai International Film Festival. The film — Nirbashito (Banished) — is inspired by Taslima and her cat, Minu. In the film directed by Churni Ganguly, Minu is called Baghini (tigress). The author is, however, not named anywhere in the film. This film won the Best Bengali film award and the sound designer trophy at the 62nd National Film Awards category.

For her second directorial, Tarikh, she received the National Award again - this time for Best Dialogue. Moreover, Tarikh was one of the two films selected for the prestigious BRICS Film Festival in 2021, hosted in Rio de Janeiro.

== Bengali television career ==
Other than working in few Hindi serials such as Raahat, Umeed etc., Ganguly has worked in Bengali television serials such as @Bhalobasha.com, which was directed by Monish Ghosh and produced by Snehasish Chakraborty; Hridayer Chorabali etc. She has acted in Bengali telefilms too. The telefilm Bandhobi was about two college friends (girls) who meet after a long time and remember those days when both of them fell in love with the same man. Bandhobi was directed by Kaushik Ganguly and Chandrayee Ghosh played Ganguly's friend's role. The telefilm Promotion dealt with single parenthood and it was shot in Darjeeling.

== Filmography ==
=== Films ===
Year	Film	Director	Role	Co actors
1997	Lav Kush	V. Madhusudhana Rao	Mandavi	Jaya Prada, Aditi Chatterjee
2004	Waarish	Kaushik Ganguly	Medha	Sabyasachi Chakrabarty, Debashree Roy
2005	Shunyo E Buke	Kaushik Ganguly	Artist's wife	Kaushik Sen, Kharaj Mukherjee
2007	Jara Bristite Bhijechhilo	Anjan Das		Indrani Halder, Sudip Mukherjee
2008	Chalo Let's Go	Anjan Dutt	Miss Gombhir	Rudranil Ghosh, Saswata Chatterjee, Parambrata Chatterjee
2009	Sakaler Rang	Suvamoy Chattopadhyay	Bhabi	Taranga Sarkar, Chhabi Talukdar, Paulomi De, Monu Mukhopadhyay
2010	Arekti Premer Golpo	Kaushik Ganguly	Rani / Gopa	Rituparno Ghosh, Indraneil Sengupta, Raima Sen
2011	Rang Milanti	Kaushik Ganguly	Kamalika's elder sister	Saswata Chatterjee, Ridhima Ghosh, Gaurav Chatterjee, Gaurav Chakraborty, Tanaji Dasgupta, Indrasheesh Ray
2012	Laptop	Kaushik Ganguly	Mrs. Durba Mukherjee	Rahul Bose, Saswata Chatterjee, Ananya Chatterjee, Gaurav Chakrabarty
2013	Arjun – Kalimpong E Sitaharan	Prem Modi	Nilam, Sita's governess	Dipankar De, Om (actor)
2013	Shabdo	Kaushik Ganguly		Raima Sen, Victor Banerjee, Ritwick Chakraborty
2013	Bakita Byaktigato	Pradipta Bhattacharya		Ritwick Chakraborty, Aparajita Ghosh Das, Madhabi Mukherjee, Debesh Roy Choudhury, Supriyo Dutta, Monu Mukherjee, Sudipa Basu, Amit Saha and Kaushik Roy
2014	Nirbashito	Churni Ganguly		Churni Ganguly, Saswata Chatterjee, Raima Sen, Lars Bethke, Lia Boysen, Martin Wallstrom, Joakim Granberg & others
2017	Chaya O Chobi	Kaushik Ganguly	Maya	Abir Chatterjee, Koyel Mallick, Priyanka Sarkar
2018	Drishtikone	Kaushik Ganguly	Rumki	Prosenjit Chatterjee, Kaushik Ganguly, Rituparna Sengupta
2018	Haami	Nandita Roy and Shiboprosad Mukherjee		
2019	Tarikh	Yes		Ritwick Chakraborty, Saswata Chatterjee, Raima Sen, Kaushik Ganguly
2021	Anusandhan	Kamaleswar Mukherjee		Saswata Chatterjee, Payel Sarkar, Joydip Mukherjee
2022	Lokkhi Chele	Kaushik Ganguly		Ujaan Ganguly, Babul Supriyo
2022	Shubho Bijoya	Rohan Sen		Bonny Sengupta, Koushani Mukherjee, Kaushik Ganguly
2023	Kaberi Antardhan	Kaushik Ganguly		Prosenjit Chatterjee, Srabanti Chatterjee
2023	Ardhangini	Kaushik Ganguly	Shubhra, Suman's ex-wife	Jaya Ahsan
2023	Rocky Aur Rani Kii Prem Kahaani	Karan Johar	Anjali Chatterjee	Ranveer Singh, Alia Bhatt, Tota Roy Chowdhury
2026	Aajo Ardhangini	Kaushik Ganguly	Shubhra	Jaya Ahsan, Kaushik Sen

=== Direction ===
- Nirbashito (2014)
- Tarikh (2019)

=== Telefilms ===
- Roop directed by Ashok Vishwanathan.
- Ushno-tar Jonyo (2010)
- A...tithi
- Bhalobashar Kotha (directed by Anjan Dutt)
- Chhoti Si Asha
- Bandhobi: (2010) The telefim was about two college friends (roles played by Churni Ganguly and Chandreyi Ghosh).
- Ambor Sen Antardhan Rahasya (1999) as Churni Chatterjee .
- Promotion: This telefilm was entirely shot in Darjeeling and dealt with single parenthood.
- Shesh Kriya (1984)

=== TV serials ===
- Kayamath as Amrita Mehra for StarPlus (2007–2009)
- Raahat for Zee TV.
- Umeed for Zee TV.
- @Bhalobasha.com (Star Jalsha)
- Chhoti si Asha.
- Bandhan (Star Jalsha)
- Hridayer Chorabali (Zee Bangla)
- Debi (Zee Bangla)

== Awards ==
Year	Title	Category	Film	Result
1996	Onida Pinnacle Award	Best Actress at the National Level		Won
2005	BFJA Awards	Best actress in a leading role	Waarish	Won
	Kalakar Awards			Won
2015	National Film Awards	Best Feature Film in Bengali (Note: The film also won the sound designer trophy at the 62nd National Award category)	Nirbasito	Won
2016	Zee Cine Awards	Best Actress	Nirbasito	Won
2019	National Film Award for Best Dialogues		Tarikh at the 66th National Film Awards	Won
2024	West Bengal Film Journalists' Association Awards	Best Actress	Ardhangini	Won
2024	7th Filmfare Awards Bangla	Best Actress in a Leading Role	Ardhangini	Won
2024	Tele Cine Award	Best Actress	Ardhangini	Won
2024	IBEA Award	Best Actress in a Leading Role Critics	Ardhangini	Won
