= Churni =

Churni may refer to:

- Churni River, in West Bengal, India
- Churni Ganguly (fl. from 1979), Indian actress
