= Rakesh Kumar Tripathi =

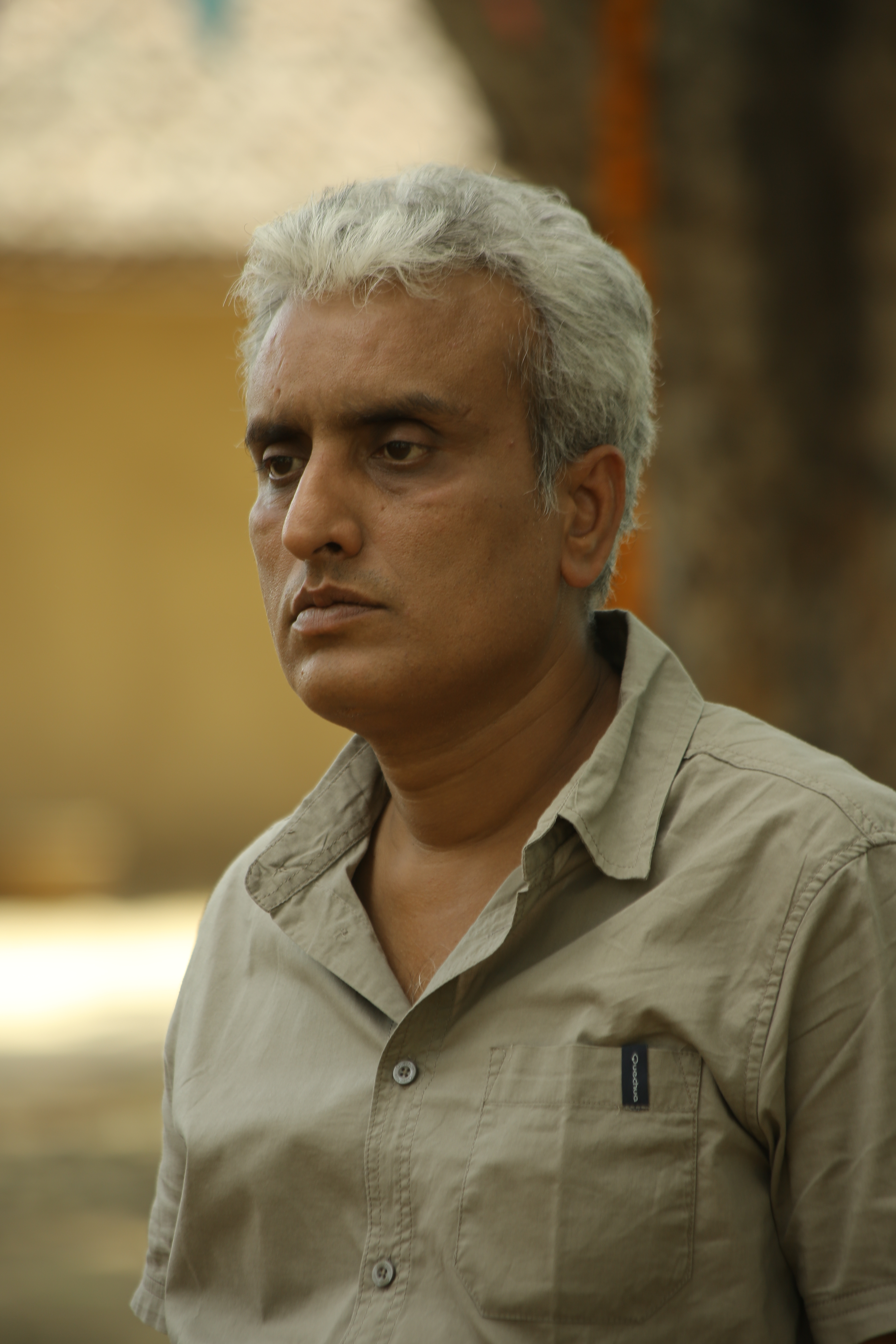
- Rakesh during the shoot of the film Panchlait on an outdoor location, Jharkhand, India, in 2017
- Born: 14 November 1970 (age 55); Kolkata, West Bengal, India
- Occupations: screenwriter, lyricist, director
- Years active: 1992 – present

Rakesh Kumar Tripathi (Hindi: राकेश त्रिपाठी; born 14 November 1970) is a screenwriter, lyricist and director based in Kolkata, West Bengal, India.

== Career ==
He did his schooling from Dum Dum KLS Hindi Vidyalaya and completed his degree from St. Paul's Cathedral Mission College. He started his career as a theater activist with a group theatre "Rangakarmee". He worked as a full-time repertory member, received scholarship from Ministry of Culture, India as a repertory member of the group. He spent eight years under guidance of Smt. Usha Ganguly, a recipient of Sangeet Natak Akademi Award. He worked there as an actor, writer as well as a back stage worker. He acted in plays like Rudali (based on a story by Mahasweta Devi), Court Martial (written by Swadesh Deepak), Lokkatha ( a play by Ratnakar Matkari), Mahabhoj (written by Mannu Bhandari), Holi (a play by Mahesh Elkunchuwar), Khoj (written by Usha Ganguly), Maiyyat, Tamasha-dar-Tamasha, Matkaa etc. He, along with the troupe, visited and performed in various cities of the country as well as abroad.

In the year 2000, He went to Mumbai, city of dreams and opportunities to explore new horizons. He worked with 'Nimbus Television' for a short tenure and later wrote several ad films for several products. He came back to his hometown, Kolkata in 2002 to finish a project and since then he is living in Kolkata.

He has written more than ten television serials for different TV channels, worked as an assistant/associate director, and written about 500 songs for films, TV serials. He has also many ad films and jingles to his contribution. He has written dialog and lyrics for a Bhojpuri film, Pistol-ego prem kahani(2009) directed by Rakesh Kumar (who later on directed several popular TV daily soaps) and a Hindi feature film Gumshuda (2010), directed by national award winner director Mr Ashoke Viswanathan, featuring Rajit Kapur, Priyanshu Chatterjee, Simone Singh, Raj Zutshi And Victor Bannerjee in the Main Cast. Rakesh Tripathi had also penned songs for Gumshuda's music album, which was released by Saregama.

He wrote a Hindi song for a Bengali feature film titled 'Banobhumi' this was the only original soundtrack in the film and was treated as the theme song of the film.

Many noted singers of Hindi and Bengali music field have sung songs written by Rakesh Tripathi, such as Sonu Nigaam, Sunidhi Chauhan, Shreya Ghoshal, Javed Ali, Shaan, June Bannerjee, Vinod Rathore, Srikanto Acharya, Shubhomita, Raghav, Rupankar, Jojo, Acharya Sanjay Chakraborty, Anweshaa etc. He has translated 10 Tagore songs in Hindi for a music album – "Ravikiran", which was released by Saregama in October 2010. The songs of this album were rearranged in a choir form by the maestro Kalyan Sen Barat.

He wrote a Hindi Feature film Panchlait in 2017. The screenplay was based on an eponymous story written by legendary Hindi litterateur Shri Phanishwar Nath 'Renu'. This became the second released film based on his writing after Teesri Kasam, directed by Basu Bhattacharya. Rakesh Tripathi also penned the lyrics of the film and had worked as associate directed in this movie. This film was released on 17 November all over India and participated in several prestigious film festivals of India. It bagged four major awards in 2nd Haryana International Film Festival including Best Inspirational Screenplay Award.

Apart from these, Rakesh has been writing songs for different tableaux displayed at Rajpath, New Delhi during The Republic Day Parade on 26 January since 2015.

He has also written or translated and narrated more than a dozen movies in Hindi language for different science museums and planetariums.

== Television ==
- Saheb Biwi Ghulam (Sahara TV) as assistant director and lyricist.
- Behula (Star Jalsha - Bengali) as an assistant director.
- 75 minutes long Films (specially produced for Tara Channel - Bengali) as an associate director.
- Reality shows (for Zee Bangla Channel) as an associate director
- Superhit Jhankar (390 episodes of non fictional TV series for Doordarshan Kolkata) as a script writer and associate director.
- Ek Nadiya Do Kinare (Daily Soap - Doordarshan) as series writer.
- Do Bahnein (TV Series - Doordarshan) as an assistant director, dialog writer and lyricist.
- Mukti (TV Series - Doordarshan) as an assistant director, dialog writer and lyricist.

== Film ==
- Tathagata, (a feature film on Buddha) as a Chief Assistant Director 2006
- Pukar, (Short film, as assistant director and actor, produced by Films Division of India ) 2006
- Banobhumi (lyricist) 2007
- Shankardev (short film, produced by Films Division of India ) 2007
- Pistol-ego prem kahani (dialog writer/lyricist) 2008
- Gumshuda (dialog writer/lyricist) 2010
- The Night Of The Interview (dialog writer) 2015
- Panchlait, based on Phanishwar Nath Renu's story (as Script, Lyrics writer and associate director) 2017
- Kaala (written lyrics for the song Dharti Pe Haq Hai), Starring Rajinikanth, Nana Patekar, Huma Qureshi, Pankaj Tripathi etc., Directed by Pa. Ranjith, Produced by Dhanush
