= Tarikh (film) =

- Theatrical release poster
- Directed by: Churni Ganguly
- Written by: Churni Ganguly
- Starring: See below
- Cinematography: Gopi Bhagat
- Edited by: Subhajit Singha
- Music by: Score: Raja Narayan Deb
- Production company: Opera Movies
- Release date: 12 April 2019
- Running time: 117 minutes
- Country: India
- Language: Bengali

Tarikh or Tarikh: A Timeline (2019) is an Indian Bengali film directed by Churni Ganguly and bankrolled by Suparnokanti Karati. This was the second film directed by Ganguly after Nirbashito. The film starring Saswata Chatterjee, Ritwick Chakraborty and Raima Sen, portrays dichotomies of human existence. The film was awarded the best Screenplay for dialogues in the 66th National Film Awards.The film was released on 12 April 2019.

== Plot ==
The film narrates a story of three individuals: Anirban Gupta, a professor, Ira, Anirban's wife, works as a hotel lobby manager, and Rudrangshu (Rudy), Anirban's childhood friend.

== Cast ==
- Saswata Chatterjee as Anirban Gupta
- Raima Sen as Ira
- Ritwick Chakraborty as Rudrangshu (Rudy),

== Release and reception ==
The film released on 12 April 2019. Firstpost gave the film 3.5 out of 5 stars and commented: "Tarikh is an exceptionally well-written film". . . and "also an excellent study of the preaching and practising of such values as socialism." Indian Express also rated 3.5 stars out of five. Cinestaan rated the film 2 out of 5 stars and wrote: "Despite the engaging performances, the film tends to disturb you but hardly offers anything to ponder. "
