= Waarish =

2004 Bengali film by Kaushik Ganguly

- DVD cover of the film
- Directed by: Kaushik Ganguly
- Starring: Debashree Roy; Sabyasachi Chakrabarty; Churni Ganguly; Aniket
- Release date: 2004
- Country: India
- Language: Bengali
- Budget: ₹6 million (US$62,000)

Waarish (Note: Waarish -this spelling has been used in the film's censor certificate. More details here.) (transl. Heir) is a 2004 Bengali film directed by Kaushik Ganguly. It stars Debashree Roy, Mamata Shankar, Sabyasachi Chakraborty, Churni Ganguly and Aniket in the leading roles. The film marked Kaushik Ganguly's directorial debut and it was also Churni Ganguly's first film on the big screen.

== Plot ==
The film revolves around the characters Shubhankar (played by Sabyasachi Chakrabarty), Preeti (Debashree Roy) and Medha (Churni Ganguly). Medha is an ex-flame of Subhankar. Medha becomes pregnant after a rendezvous with Subhankar. Though Medha was not married with Subhankar, she denies abortion and gives birth to a son, Megh.

Many years later, when Medha is suffering from cancer, she goes to meet Shubhankar, discloses her condition and requests him to take Megh into his care. At this time Subhankar is married to Preeti. So, he feels hesitant and shocked. Medha stays in Shubhankar's home and tells Preeti that she is Shubhankar's distant relative. Preeti starts caring for Medha like her own and makes her stay with them until the treatment is over. Medha's condition worsens and finally she dies.

== Cast ==
- Sabyasachi Chakrabarty as Subhankar
- Debashree Roy as Preeti
- Churni Ganguly as Medha
- Aniket as Megh
- Santu Mukhopadhyay
- Nirmal Kumar as the doctor
- Mamata Shankar

== See also ==
- Shunyo E Buke
- Laptop
