= Sakaler Rang =

- Film poster
- Directed by: Suvamoy Chattopadhyay
- Screenplay by: Suvamoy Chattopadhyay
- Story by: Suvamoy Chattopadhyay
- Produced by: Srabanti (Dona) Das
- Starring: Churni Ganguly; Monu Mukhopadhyay; Taranga Sarkar
- Edited by: Suvamoy Chattopadhyay
- Release date: 2009
- Country: India
- Language: Bengali
- Budget: ₹900,000 (US$9,400)

Sakaler Rang (transl. The colours of the morning) is a Bengali film directed by Suvamoy Chattopadhyay. This was Suvamoy's first movie as a director. This budget of the film was ₹900,000 (US$9,400). Because of this reason, Suvamoy had to take the burden of almost all the departments of the film.

== Plot ==
Prananath aspires to educate the children of his village and goes to the city to earn and send back money for books. Eventually, the village gets a school, but the locals are in for some shocking news.

== Cast and crew ==
=== Cast ===
- Taranga Sarkar as Prananath.
- Paulomi DeSakina.
- Monu Mukhopadhyay as Teacher.
- Churni Ganguly as Bhabi.

=== Crew ===
- Direction: Suvomoy Chattopadhyay
- Producer: Srabanti (Dona) Das.
- Music direction: Suvomoy Chattopadhyay
- Lyrics: Suvomoy Chattopadhyay
- Story: Suvomoy Chattopadhyay
- Screenplay: Suvomoy Chattopadhyay
- Editor: Suvomoy Chattopadhyay
