= Arjun: Kalimpong E Sitaharan =

2013 Indian Bengali-language film

Arjun – Kalimpong E Sitaharan
- Theatrical release poster
- Directed by: Prem Prakash Modi
- Screenplay by: Abhijit Sarkar
- Story by: Samaresh Majumdar
- Based on: Sitaharan Rahasya and Khunkharapi by Samaresh Majumdar
- Produced by: Mukul Sarkar
- Starring: Sabyasachi Chakraborty; Om; Raya Chowdhury; Dipankar De; Biswajit Chakraborty; Manoj Mitra
- Cinematography: Rana Dasgupta
- Music by: Nilotpal Munshi
- Distributed by: T.Sarkar Productions
- Release date: 3 May 2013 (Kolkata)
- Country: India
- Language: Bengali

Arjun – Kalimpong E Sitaharan is a 2013 thriller Bengali film directed by Prem Prakash Modi and produced by Mukul Sarkar under the banner of T. Sarkar Productions. The film features actors Om and Sabyasachi Chakraborty in the lead roles. This action and thriller marks the debut of young Bengali actor Om in the role of detective Arjun. Based on Sitaharan Rahasya and Khunkharapi by Samaresh Majumdar, the film was released on 3 May 2013.

== Plot ==
Arjun is a sleuth cum science fiction character of Jalpaiguri created by famous Bengali writer Samaresh Majumdar for young children. He wrote many stories in the Arjun series, namely Arjun Ebaar Kolkata-e, Arjun Beriye Elo, Arjun@bipbip.com and many more. This film is the first of the Arjun series based on Sitaharan Rahasya and Khunkharapi. In the film, Arjun (Om) is seen solving a case with the help of his mentor and guide, Amol Shome (Sabyasachi Chakraborty) in Kalimpong. He is portrayed as a Gen X sleuth who doesn't own a mobile phone but can be seen riding a bike.

Sita is a teenager, who is on the verge of adulthood. She was born and brought up in the U.S. and has been brought to Kalimpong as a preventive step of her father, who wants to keep her away from her boyfriend, whom he thinks to be a bad influence for her. She is looked after by her caretaker Neelam. Her father is afraid of an attack from goons who think that the master plan of a monastery is hidden somewhere in his house. But later on, matters get serious and deep because everyone seems to be involved in a kind of conspiracy and treachery. Climax is revealed by Amol da as the culprit being Sita's father.

== Cast ==
- Om as Arjun
- Sabyasachi Chakraborty as Amal Shome
- Raya Chowdhury as Sita
- Dipankar De as Mr. Sen
- Churni Ganguly as Neelam
- Biswajit Chakraborty as Major
- Manoj Mitra as Bistubabu
- David Chen

== Filming ==
The film was shot in several locations of West Bengal and Sikkim, which included photogenic spots in Kalimpong, with misty mountains and dense jungles.

Arjun's USP lies elsewhere. He is young and is not a detective by profession. Working closely with Amol Shome ( Sabyasachi Chakraborty) inspires him to take on more such adventures. Also, he is not Kolkata-based. Arjun is a small-town guy who works under constraints. He is neither aged nor mature, but has an athletic body and a sharp mind. He is bound to appeal to the youth.

— Debutante Om about his character to The Times of India

== Critical reception ==
Arjun – Kalimpong E Sitaharan got mixed reviews from critics and reviewers. Gomolo rated it 2.65 out of 5 stars. Critics of Timescity rated it 3 out of 5 stars and said that the film failed to make a mark and even commented on the weak dialogues and loud background score. Along with Timescity, even the critics of In.com, who rated the movie 2.5 out of 5 stars, said that the film ended in such a way that highlighted the possibility of a sequel. Tollywood Dhamaka rated the movie 2 out of 5 stars and said that the movie is quite confusing. Nowrunning.com rated it 2.8 out of 5 stars and critic Anurima Das said that Om needs to be more careful about his role as Arjun for the sequel, though the debut was good. The character of Arjun was even compared to other older and mature sleuths such as Feluda, Byomkesh Bakshi and Kakababu.
