= Arjun (character) =

Fictional detective

- First appearance: Khutimari Range (1983)
- Last appearance: Arjun Ebaar Chilapatay (2019)
- Created by: Samaresh Majumdar

In-universe information
- Full name: Arjun Roy
- Occupation: Truth Investigator
- Family: Arjun's mother
- Nationality: Indian
- Residence: Jalpaiguri
- Other characters: Amal Shome; Major; Bistusaheb

Arjun is a young fictional detective character of Bengali literature. He lives at Jalpaiguri in West Bengal. The character was created by Samaresh Majumdar in 1983. Arjun's mentor is retired official cop, Mr. Amal Shome. Although in first few stories, Arjun started as an assistant of Shome, later in the series, he started to solve cases independently as truth investigator.

== Books of Arjun series ==
1. Khutimari Range
2. Khoonkharaapi
3. Kalimpong e Shita Horon
4. Chandigarh e Gondogol
5. Lighter
6. Dwitiyo Lighter
7. Tingchuk Monastery er Heeray
8. Hangor er Petay Heeray
9. Jutoy Rokter Daag
10. Der Din
11. Rotnogorbhaa
12. Kalapahaar
13. Borof e Paayer Chaap
14. Arjun Ebaar Kolkatay
15. Mac Shaheb er Naatni
16. Arjun Beriye Elo
17. Ghumghum er Shenbari
18. Carvalhor Baksho
19. Arjun @beepbeep.com
20. Yetir Attiyo
21. 1 Mukhi Rudrakkho
22. Dracullar Shondhanay Arjun
23. Joyontir Jongol e
24. 3 Jaaliyaat Ebong 1 Mitthebadi
25. Dindupuray Raatdupur
26. Nobaabganj er Norokhadok
27. Phool e Bish er Gondho
28. Bishaalyakarani
29. Maanush Pachaar
30. Lobonhrod Londobhondo
31. Samannandan Yamnandan
32. Shitahoron Rohossho
33. Hishebay Bhul Chilo
34. Mushkil Aasaan
35. 10 Bongsho Dhangsho
36. Arjun Ebaar Chilapataay
37. Khiljir Guhaay Arjun
38. Arjun Ebaar Bangladesh e
39. Laakh Takar Paathor
40. 2 Dikay 1 Arjun
41. Arjun er Protiddondi
42. Adim Ondhokaaray Arjun
43. Arjun Ebaar New York e
44. Arjun Ebong Chinese Cigarette
- Arjun Shomogro (1-6)

== Adaptations ==
- Based on Sitaharan Rahasya and Khunkharapi, a film was released in 2013 named Arjun: Kalimpong E Sitaharan. A Hindi tele-serial was released as Jungle Ki Gaherai Mey, based on Arjun novel, Derdin. Kaushik Sen played the role of Arjun.
- On 18 July 2022, Radio Mirchi Kolkata (98.3 MHz) station aired the story "Der Din" on the Sunday Suspense show.
- In March 2023, Radio Mirchi Kolkata (98.3 MHz) station aired the story "Jutoy Rokter Daag" on the Sunday Suspense show.
- In June 2023, Radio Mirchi Kolkata (98.3 MHz) station aired the story "Kalimpong ey Sitaharan" on the Sunday Suspense show.
- In 2024, Goppo Mir er Thek streamed "Dracular Sondhane Arjun".
- In 2025, Goppo Mir er Thek streamed "Arjun Ebar Bangladeshe", "Ekmukhi Ruddrakhho".
