= Scottish Church College =

Public college in Kolkata, West Bengal, India

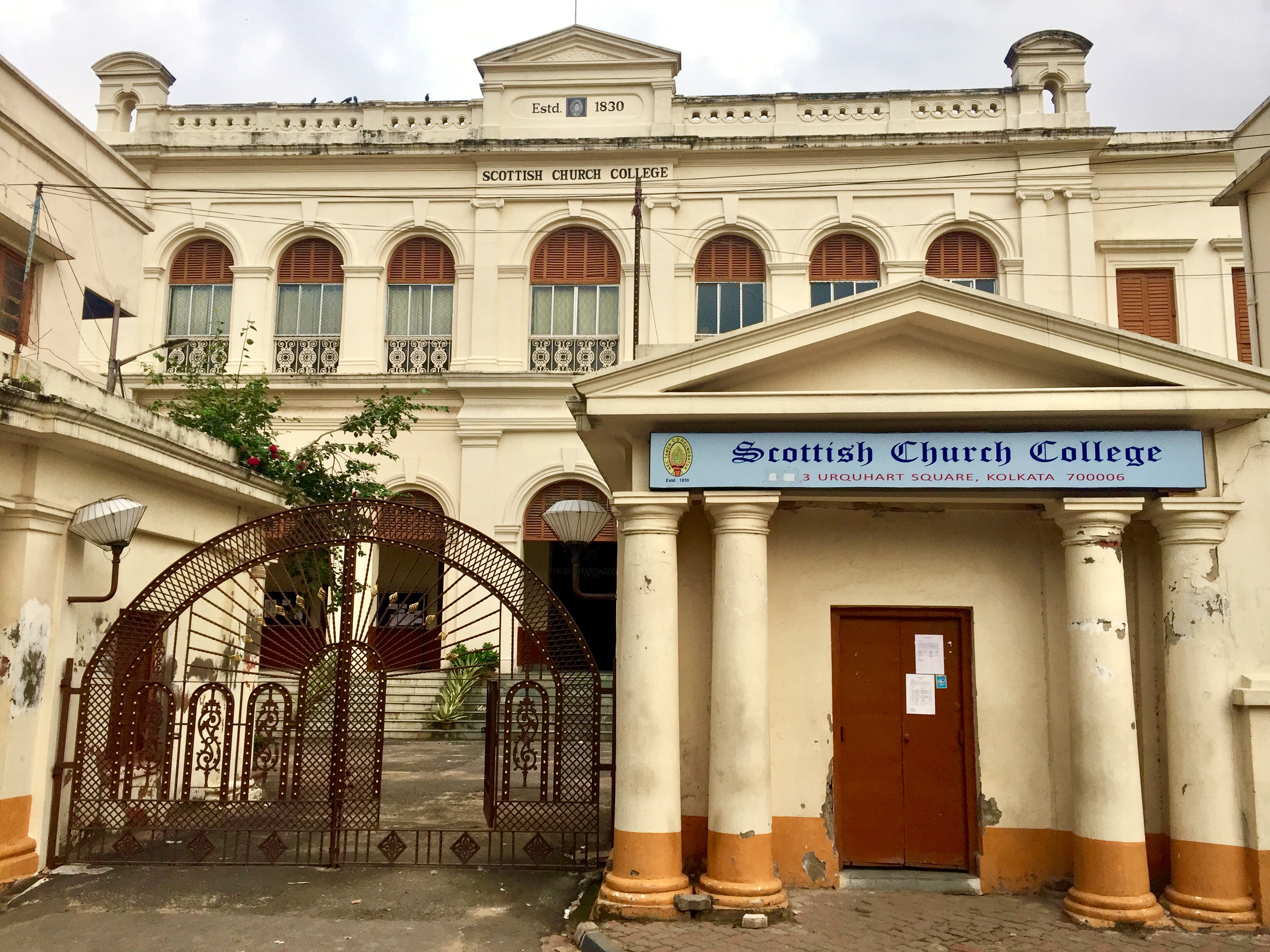
- Emblem of the Scottish Church College
- Former names: 1830: General Assembly's Institution; 1843: Free Church Institution; 1863: Duff College; 1908: Scottish Churches College; 1929: Scottish Church College
- Motto: Nec Tamen Consumebatur (Latin)
- Motto in English: "The bush burns, but is not consumed"
- Type: Public
- Established: 13 July 1830; 196 years ago
- Founder: Alexander Duff
- Religious affiliation: Church of North India, Presbyterian
- Academic affiliations: University of Calcutta
- Principal: Dr. Madhumanjari Mandal
- Administrative staff: 164
- Undergraduates: 1518 (As of 2016–17)
- Postgraduates: 97 (As of 2017–18)
- Location: 1 & 3, Urquhart Square, Manicktala, Azad Hind Bag, Kolkata, West Bengal, India; 22.54837°N 88.35596°E
- Campus: Urban
- Language: English, Bengali, Hindi
- Nickname: The Caledonians
- Website: www.scottishchurch.ac.in

Scottish Church College is a college affiliated by Calcutta University, India. It offers selective co-educational undergraduate and postgraduate studies and is the oldest continuously running Christian liberal arts and sciences college in Asia. It has been rated (A) by the Indian National Assessment and Accreditation Council. Students and alumni call themselves "Caledonians" in the name of the college festival, "Caledonia". The Scottish Church College has been embellished as GRADE-I Heritage Building on 8 November 2023.

== Foundation ==
The origins are traceable to the life of Alexander Duff (1806–1878), the first overseas missionary of the Church of Scotland, to India. Known initially as the General Assembly's Institution, it was founded on 13 July 1830. Alexander Duff was born on 25 April 1806, in Moulin, Perthshire, located in the Scottish countryside. He attended the University of St Andrews where after graduation, he opted for a missionary life. Subsequently, he undertook his evangelical mission to India. In a voyage that involved two shipwrecks (first on the ship Lady Holland off Dassen Island, near Cape Town, and later on the ship Moira, near the Ganges delta) and the loss of his personal library consisting of 800 volumes (of which 40 survived), and college prizes, he arrived in Calcutta on 27 May 1830.

Supported by the Governor-General of India Lord William Bentinck, Rev. Alexander Duff opened his institution in Feringhi Kamal Bose's house, located in upper Chitpore Road, near Jorasanko. In 1836 the institution was moved to Gorachand Bysack's house at Garanhatta. Mr. MacFarlane, the Chief-Magistrate of Calcutta, laid the foundation stone on 23 February 1837. Mr. John Gray, elected by Messrs. Burn & Co. and superintended by Captain John Thomson of the East India Company designed the building. It is possible that he may have been inspired by the facade of the Holy House of Mercy in Macau, which reflects the influence of Portuguese. Traces of English Palladianism are also evident in the design of the college. The construction of the building was completed in 1839.

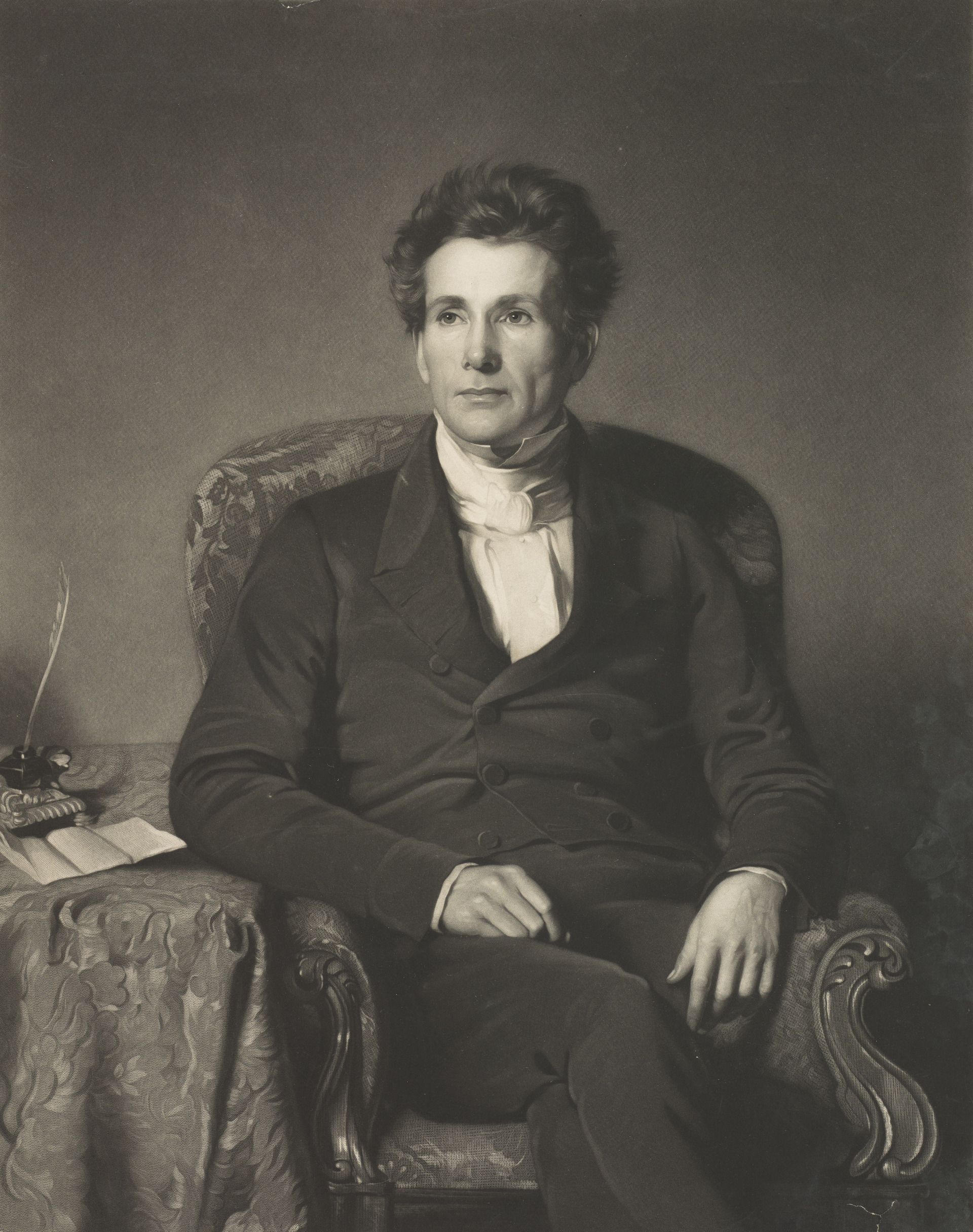
Alexander Duff (1806–1878)

== Historical context ==
In the early 1800s, under the regime of the East India Company, English education and Missionary activities were initially suspect. While the East India Company supported Orientalist instruction in the vernacular languages like Persian, Arabic and Sanskrit, and helped to establish institutions like Calcutta Madrasah College, and Sanskrit College, in general, colonial administrative policy discouraged the dissemination of knowledge in their language, that is in English. The general apathy of the Company towards the cause of education and improvement of natives is in many ways, the background for the agency of missionaries like Duff.

Inspired by the General Assembly of the Church of Scotland, Reverend Alexander Duff, then a young missionary, arrived in India's colonial capital to set up an English-medium institution. Though Bengalis had shown some interest in the spread of Western education from the beginning of the 19th century, both the local church and government officers were skeptical about the high-caste Bengali's response to the idea of an English-medium institution. While Orientalists like James Prinsep were supportive of the idea of vernacular education, Duff and prominent Indians like Raja Ram Mohan Roy supported the use of English as a medium of instruction. His emphasis on the use of English on Indian soil was prophetic:

The English language, I repeat it, is the lever which, as the instrument of conveying the entire range of knowledge, is destined to move all Hindustan.

Raja Ram Mohan Roy helped Duff by organizing the venue and bringing in the first batch of students. He also assured the guardians that reading the King James's Bible did not necessarily imply religious conversion, unless that was based on inner spiritual conviction. Imbibing the tenets of the Scottish educational system that shaped his ideals, Duff was, unlike the missionaries and scholars at the Serampore College, wholeheartedly committed to the cause of instruction in the English language, as that facilitated the advanced study of European religion, literature and science. By carefully selecting teachers, European and Indian, who brought out the best of Christian and secular understandings, and by emphasizing advanced pedagogical techniques that emphasized the Socratic method of classroom debate, inquiry, and rational thinking, Duff and his followers established an educational system, whose impact in spreading progressive values in contemporary Bengal would be profound. Although his ultimate aim was the spread of English education, Duff was aware that a foreign language could not be mastered without command of the native language. Hence in his General Assembly's Institution (as later in his Free Church Institution), teaching and learning in the dominant vernacular Bengali language was also emphasized. Duff and his successors also underscored the necessity of sports among his students. When he introduced political economy as a subject in the curricula, his faced his church's criticism.

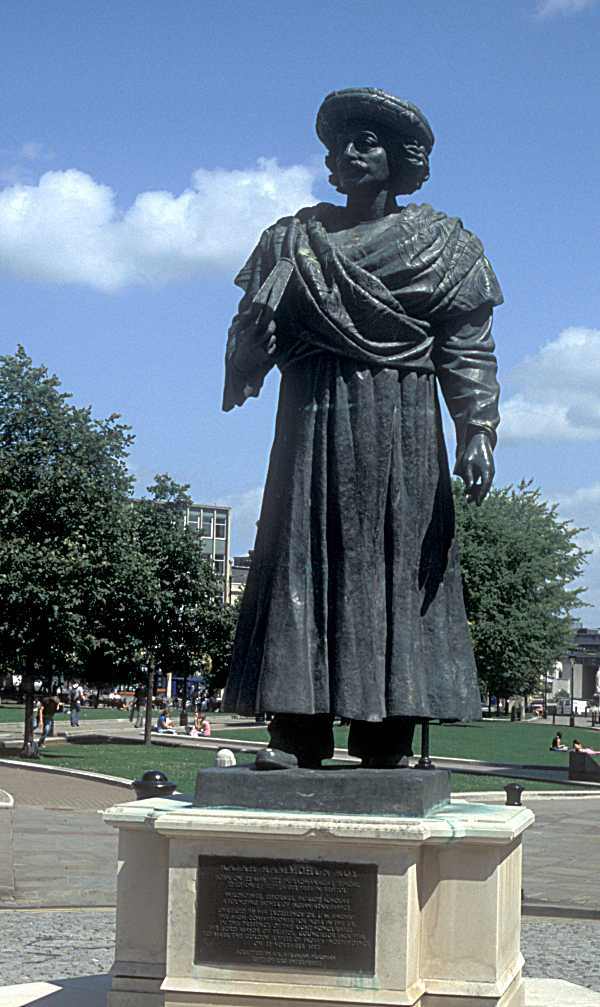
The great social reformer Raja Ram Mohan Roy supported Reverend Duff in his efforts.

In 1840, Duff returned to India. At the Disruption of 1843, Duff sided with the Free Church. He gave up the college buildings, with all their effects and established a new institution, called the Free Church Institution. He had the support of Sir James Outram and Sir Henry Lawrence, and the encouragement of seeing a new band of converts, including several young men born of high caste. In 1844, governor-general Viscount Hardinge opened government appointments to all who had studied in institutions similar to Duff's institution. In the same year, Duff co-founded the Calcutta Review, of which he served as editor from 1845 to 1849. In 1857, when the University of Calcutta was established, the Free Church Institution was one of its earliest affiliates, and Duff would also serve in the university's first senate. These two institutions founded by Duff, i.e., the General Assembly's Institution and the Free Church Institution would be merged later to form the Scottish Churches College. After the unification of the Church of Scotland in 1929, the institution would be known as Scottish Church College.

Along with Raja Ram Mohan Roy, the great social reformer often called the father of modern India, Dr. Duff supported Lord Macaulay in drafting his influential Minute for the introduction of English education in India. Eminent contemporary and successive missionary scholars from Scotland, notably Dr. Ogilvie, Dr. Hastie, Dr. Macdonald, Dr. Stephen, Dr. Watt, and William Spence Urquhart contributed in spreading liberal Western education. The institutions founded by Duff have been coterminous with other contemporary institutions like the Serampore College, and the Hindu College in ushering the spirit of intellectual inquiry and a general acceptance of the ideals of the Enlightenment among Bengali Hindus, the then dominant indigenous ethno-linguistic group in the Company administered Indian territories. This exchange of ideas and ideals, and adoption of progressive values that would eventually influence many social reform movements in South Asia, has been widely regarded by historians specializing in nineteenth century India, as the epochs of the Young Bengal Movement and later, the Bengal Renaissance.

Duff's contemporaries included Reverend Mackay, Reverend Ewart and Reverend Thomas Smith. Till the early 20th century the norm was to bring teachers from Scotland, and this brought forth scholars like William Spence Urquhart, Henry Stephen, H.M. Percival etc. Indian scholars were also engaged as teachers by the college authorities, and the notable faculty includes names like Surendranath Banerjee, Kalicharan Bandyopadhyay, Jnan Chandra Ghosh, Gouri Shankar Dey, Adhar Chandra Mukhopadhyay, Sushil Chandra Dutta, Mohimohan Basu, Sudhir Kumar Dasgupta, Nirmal Chandra Bhattacharya, Bholanath Mukhopadhyay and Kalidas Nag, all of whom had all contributed to enhancing the academic standards of the college.

The college authorities played a pioneering role in promoting gender equality by emphasizing the significance of women's education. During much of the nineteenth century, the college remained the only institution of its kind in the city of Calcutta (and indeed in the country) to promote the cause of co-education. Female students comprise half the present roll strength of the college. With the added interest of the missionaries in educational work and social welfare, the college stands as a monument to Indo-Scottish co-operation.

=== Postage stamp ===
On 27 September 1980, the Indian Postal Service released a commemorative stamp of the college.

== Campus and infrastructure ==
=== Buildings ===
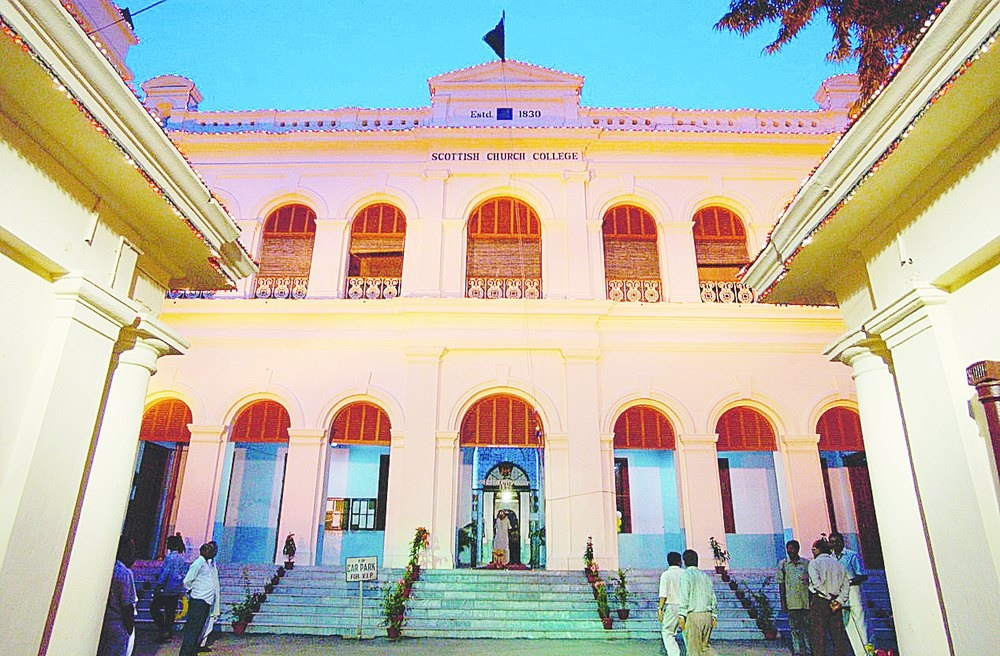
Scottish Church College main building

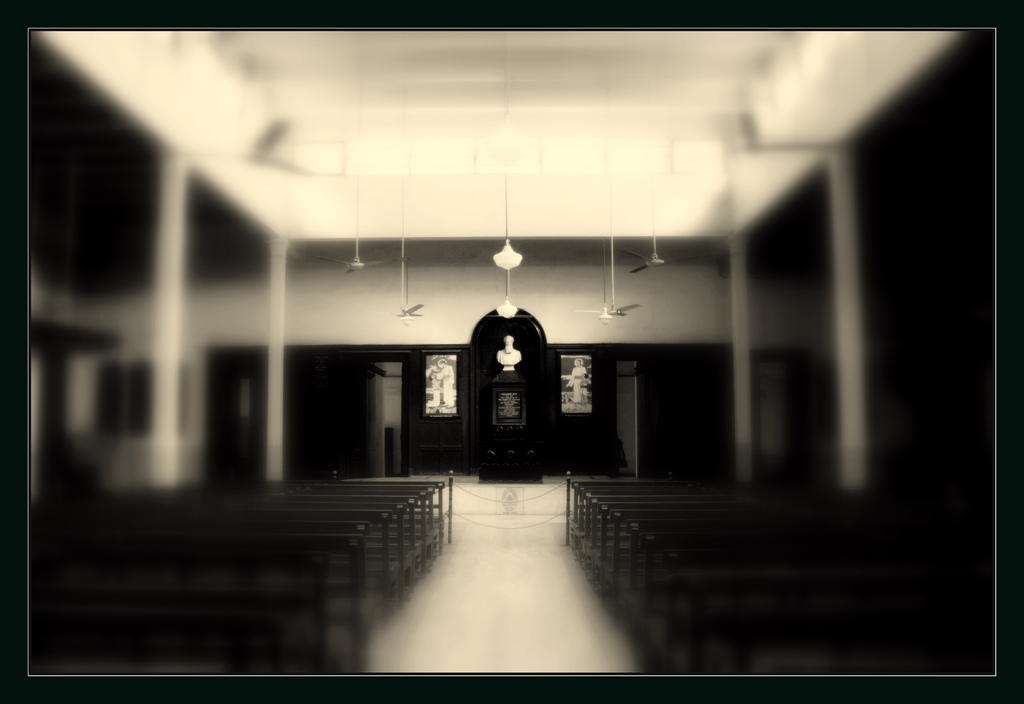
Scottish Church College Assembly Hall

The main building houses the economics, history, political science, philosophy, zoology, botany, mathematics, English, Sanskrit and Bengali departments. A separate Science annex building houses the departments of physics and chemistry. Situated in the main campus, the central library of the college is computerized. The biological science departments are in possession of a museum and a 'poly-house'. The college is encompassed by a garden and a lawn. Many medicinal plants are grown in the garden under the care of the botany department. There are rare and non-native plants in the garden as well. The Scottish Church College campus is a 'green' campus with solar lighting. A separate building houses the department of teacher education.

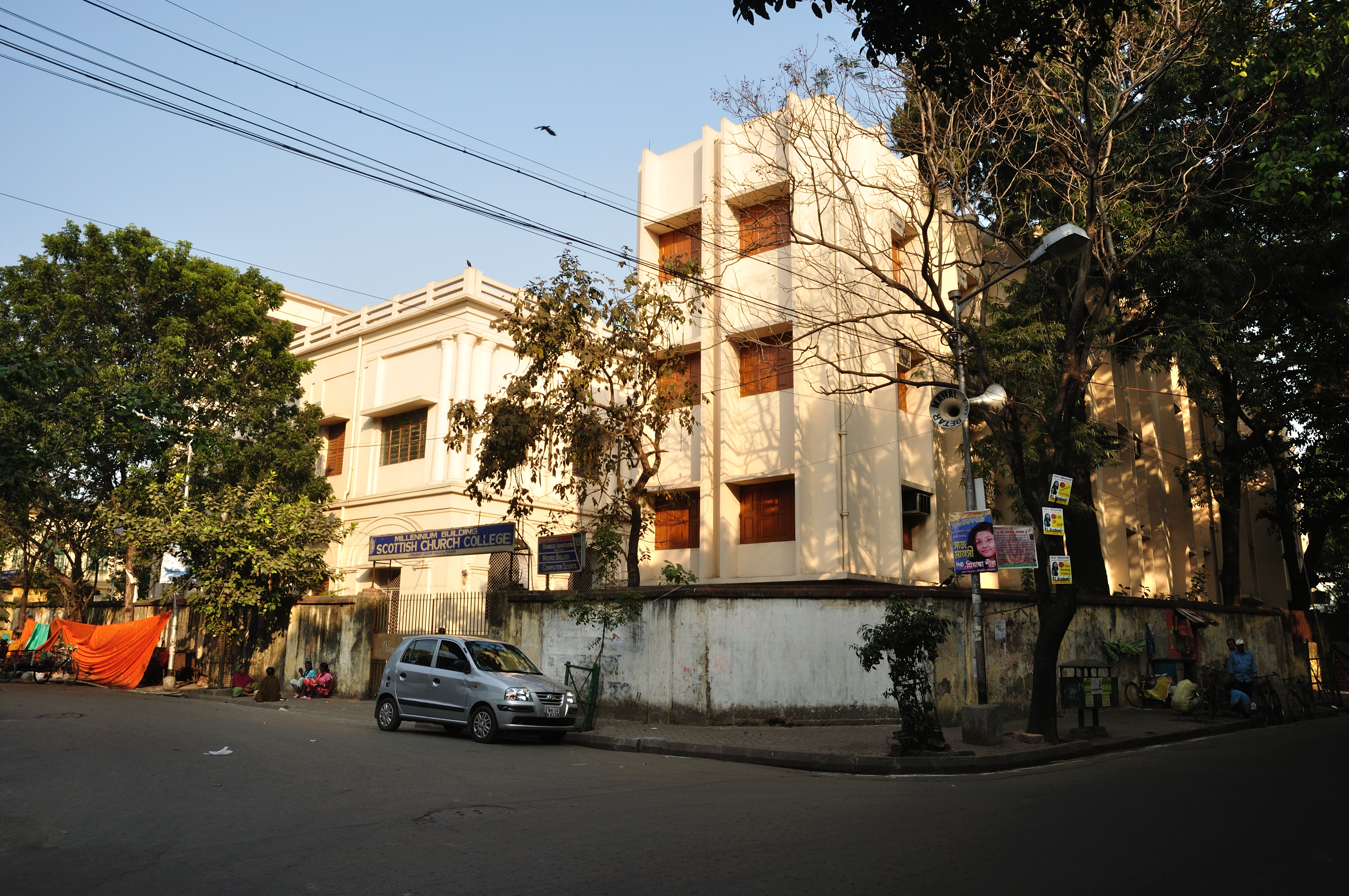
Scottish Church College Millennium Building

== Halls of residence ==
The college presently has four hostels for its students, all of which are situated near the college. Previously, another hostel, Students' Residence (for Girls) was present. They have recreational common rooms with audio-visual equipment.

- Lady Jane Dundas Hostel (For girls only): 71/1 Bidhan Sarani, Kolkata-6.
- Duff Hostel: 32/8, Abhedananda Road, Kolkata-6.(Beadon Street)
- Ogilvie Hostel: 31/2, Hurtaki Bagan Lane, Kolkata-6.
- Wann Hostel: 32/8 Abhendananda Road, Kolkata-6. (Beadon Street)

== College publications ==
The college publications are annual and consist of contributions from students and staff.

- The Journal of Humanities and Social Sciences, a refereed international academic journal with an interdisciplinary approach which publishes research articles written by both experienced and young scholars all over the world, is annually published by the college. The journal discusses issues from points of view such as liberalism, empiricism, positivism, Marxism, structuralism, psychoanalysis, postmodernism, deconstruction, feminism, subaltern studies and postcolonialism. The advisory board consists of personalities such as Amartya Sen, Gayatri Chakravorty Spivak, Partha Chatterjee, Dipesh Chakrabarty and Amiya Kumar Bagchi.
- Sanket, a short magazine, is published annually by the Scottish Church College Literary society. It was first published in 2015.

== Extra-curricular activities ==
=== National Service Scheme ===
Four faculty members and three library staff are involved with social work at an informal level in their neighbourhood. The NSS Unit organised several environment/health/hygiene-related programmes in the college in collaboration with the United Board for Christian Higher Education in Asia and the college's department of Teacher Education. The volunteers of the college NSS unit participated in North-East Youth Festival, held at Arunachal Pradesh in 2012 and NSS Mega Camp held at Assam in 2013. Some of them also took part in Rock Climbing and Adventure camp at Balasore, Odisha (India) and were awarded the title of "Basic Mountaineer".

The college received four awards from the University of Calcutta for its activities in NSS. Prof. U.N. Nandi became the Best Program Officer in 2009. Parag Chatterjee, a student of Computer Science and the NSS student leader (2011–2013), was awarded "Best Volunteer" by the university.

== Awards and recognition ==
In 2006, the University Grants Commission (India) accepted the recommendations of the University of Calcutta to regard the college as "College with Potential for Excellence".

== Status and initiatives ==
- Until 1953, administrative control over the college was exercised by the Foreign Mission Committee of the Church of Scotland. This was exercised by a local council consisting of representatives of the Church of Scotland and the United Church of Northern India. Later the Foreign Mission Committee of Church of Scotland relinquished its authority to the United Church of Northern India, and in 1970, the United Church of Northern India joined the Church of North India as a constituent body. This made the Church of North India the de facto and de jure successor (to the Church of Scotland) in running the administration of the college. As the college was founded on Christian (Protestant and Presbyterian) foundations, it derives its legal authority and status as a religious minority institution as defined by the scope of Article 30 of the Constitution of India.
- On 27 September 1980, the Indian Postal Service released a commemorative stamp on the college.
- In 2003, the college buildings and premises underwent renovation, with the financial support of the alumni and well-wishers.
- In 2004, the general section of the college was awarded grade 'A' after accreditation by the National Assessment and Accreditation Council. The same grade was awarded upon reaccreditation in 2014.
- Since 2004, the college has been a member of the United Board for Christian Higher Education in Asia and is a participant in that organization's Asian University Leadership Program.
- In 2011, the Scottish Government instituted a Centre of Tagore Studies in Edinburgh's Napier University, to facilitate integrated research on Rabindranath Tagore's works and philosophy. In Calcutta, this scholarly initiative (with student exchange programs) was extended to the college, involving the departments of English, Bengali and philosophy.
- The University Grants Commission sponsors the construction of the Quarto Sept Centennial Jubilee Building project of the college. The building plan has been approved by the Heritage Committee of the Kolkata Municipal Corporation for necessary approval. The construction of the new building has been completed with modern equipments and audio-visual system worth for having special lectures which can also be broadcast to other colleges through online. The building was Inaugurated by the Members of college administrative body (College Rector Dr.J.Abraham and Principal alongside)
- Scottish Church College celebrated its 184th Foundation Day and its first Alexander Duff Memorial Lecture on 13 July 2013. Dr. S. C. Jamir, the Honorable Governor of Odisha and an alumnus of the college, delivered the first Alexander Duff Memorial Lecture.

== In popular culture ==
=== In fiction ===
- Satyajit Ray's fictional scientist-cum-investigator Professor Shonku started his career as a professor of physics at the Scottish Church College.
- Samaresh Majumdar's bestselling novel Kalbela, which explores Calcutta's culture, politics and society in the aftermath of the 1970s Naxalite movement, won the Sahitya Akademi Award in 1984. It featured the college as a backdrop in the storyline.
- Samaresh Majumdar's Animesh quartet, a series of four novels (Uttoradhikar, Kalbela and Kalpurush, and Mousholkal), revolves around the life and experiences of Animesh Mitra, an alumnus, who witnesses the tumultuous socio-political transformations in post-independence West Bengal.

=== In non-fiction ===
- Kaalbela: Calcutta My Love, a 2009 Bengali film directed by Goutam Ghose on the events of the 1970s Naxalite movement, had scenes which were shot at the college.
- Egaro: The Immortal Eleven was a 2011 sports film in Bengali directed by Arun Roy, that was based on the Mohun Bagan Athletic Club's victory over the East Yorkshire Regiment in the finals of the 1911 IFA Shield. Three members of the winning team were students of the college. The film also showed the college as a background.
- Natoker Moto was a 2015 biographical Bengali language film, which was roughly based on the life and tragic death of Keya Chakraborty, an alumna, who subsequently became a prominent theatre personality. The character based on her is called Kheya in the film.

== Courses ==
- Bengali
- English
- Hindi
- History
- Philosophy
- Political science
- Sanskrit
- Sociology
- Psychology
- Physical education
- Commerce

=== Science ===
- Botany
- Chemistry
- Computer science
- Economics
- Mathematics
- Physics
- Zoology
- Statistics
- Microbiology

=== Post Graduate ===
- Botany
- Chemistry

==== Teacher Education ====
- B.Ed

== See also ==
- Scottish Church Collegiate School, the twin institution of the college, also founded by Reverend Alexander Duff
- Category:Academic staff of Scottish Church College

== Sources ==
- Abraham, John (2008), "A Foreword", in Datta, Asit (ed.), 175th Year Commemoration Volume, Kolkata, India: Scottish Church College, OCLC 243677369
- Bandyopadhyay, Kausik (2008), "Games Ethic in Bengal: A Commentary on the sporting tradition of the Scottish Church College", in Datta, Asit (ed.), 175th Year Commemoration Volume, Kolkata, India: Scottish Church College, OCLC 243677369
- Basu, Pradip (2008), "The Question of Colonial Modernity and Scottish Church College", in Datta, Asit (ed.), 175th Year Commemoration Volume, Kolkata, India: Scottish Church College, OCLC 243677369
- Datta, Asit, ed. (2008), 175th Year Commemoration Volume, Kolkata, India: Scottish Church College, OCLC 243677369
- Matilal, Anup (2008), "The Scottish Church College: A Brief Discourse on the Origins of an Institution", in Datta, Asit (ed.), 175th Year Commemoration Volume, Kolkata, India: Scottish Church College, OCLC 243677369
