= Panchlait =

- Panchlait Movie Poster
- Directed by: Prem Prakash Modi
- Written by: Phanishwar Nath 'Renu'
- Screenplay by: Rakesh Kumar Tripathi
- Produced by: Anup Todi; Anil Somani; Pramod Goyal
- Starring: Amitosh Nagpal; Anuradha Mukherjee; Yashpal Sharma; Rajesh Sharma; Ravi Jhankal; Brijendra Kala
- Cinematography: Supratim Bhol
- Edited by: Sanjib Datta
- Music by: Kalyan Sen Barat
- Production company: Funtime Entertainment www.funtimeentertainment.in
- Release date: 17 November 2017
- Country: India
- Language: Hindi

Panchlait (transl. Lamp Used in Panchayat) (Note: In Hindi, Panchlait is a colloquial reference to a lamp used at Panchyat offices by its office bearers, called Panch.) is a 2017 Indian Hindi-language social comedy film based on Phanishwar Nath 'Renu''s short story 'Panchlight'. This movie directed by Prem Prakash Modi features Amitosh Nagpal, Anuradha Mukherjee, Yashpal Sharma, Rajesh Sharma, Ravi Jhankal, Brijendra Kala, Lalit Parimoo, Pranay Narayan and Anurima Ghosh in important roles. Panchlait was released on 17 November 2017. Currently the film is streaming on MX Player.

== Plot ==
Set in a rural backdrop, Panchlait tells the story of a village community called Mahato tola, that still has no electricity. The storyline is hinged on multiple and layered social interactions and an ethereal romance brewing between the lead characters. The people in this small village lives in darkness, engrossed in their own little sorrows and joys. Panchlait, also known as Petromax, plays an integral part in a villagers life and possessing one is a mark of honor. After much efforts, the villagers manage to acquire the coveted Panchlait. But the villagers are so innocent and inexperienced that they do not know how to light a simple lamp. Their lack of knowledge leads to hilarious situations. The only person who knows how to light the petromax is outcast from the village named Godhan who was falsely accused and thrown out of the Village. The rest of the story focuses on how the villagers manage to light up the village despite the shortcomings.

== Cast ==
The details of the cast of the film is given below.

- Amitosh Nagpal as Godhan
- Anuradha Mukherjee as Munri
- Yashpal Sharma as Sarpanch Naginaa Mahto
- Rajesh Sharma as Mulgain
- Ravi Jhankal as Sardaar Jagnandan Mahto
- Brijendra Kala as Chhadidaar Aganu Mahto
- Lalit Parimoo
- Punit Tiwari
- Pranay Narayan as Deewan Judhisthir Mahto
- Iqbal Sultan as Collector Mahto
- Anurima Ghosh
- Punyadarshan Gupta
- Arup Zaigirdar
- Malini Sengupta as Gulri
- Kalpana Jha
- Nayna Bandhopadhyay as Kaneli
- Uma Basu

== Music ==
The music director and lyricist of the film are Kalyan Sen Barat and Rakesh Kumar Tripathi respectively. The sound designing is handled by Anirban Sengupta. The songs are sung by Javed Ali, Rupankar, Anweshaa and Pt Sanjay Chakrabarty.

== Accolades ==
Award	Date of ceremony (Note: Date is linked to the article about the awards held that year, wherever possible.)	Category	Recipients	Result	Ref.
International Film Festival of India	November 2018	Official Selection	Panchlait	Nominated	49th International Film Festival of India
Jagran Film Festival	August 2018	Indian Competition	Panchlait	Nominated	
Habitat International Film Festival	May 2018	Hindi Films	Panchlait	Nominated	
Jharkhand International Film Festival Awards	May 2018	Best Art/Cultural Film	Panchlait	Won	
Haryana International Film Festival	December 2017	Best Inspiring Film	Panchlait	Won	
Haryana International Film Festival	December 2017	Best Director	Prem Prakash Modi	Won	
Haryana International Film Festival	December 2017	Best Actor	Amitosh Nagpal	Won	
Haryana International Film Festival	December 2017	Best Screenplay	Rakesh Kumar Tripathi	Won	
