= Parti Parikatha =

1957 novel by Phanishwar Nath Renu

- Author: Phanishwar Nath Renu
- Language: Hindi
- Genre: Novel
- Publication date: 1957
- Publication place: India

Parti Parikatha (Story of the Barren soil or Tale of a Wasteland), is a Hindi novel written by Phanishwar Nath Renu. The story revolves around a motley group of characters in a remote village of North Eastern Bihar in the backdrop of Zamindari (landlordism) Abolition movement.

== See also ==
- Maila Anchal, also by Phanishwar Nath Renu.
