= Janatar Aadalat =

- Directed by: Manoj Thakur
- Written by: Shaktipada Rajguru
- Produced by: Partha Chakraborty
- Starring: Jisshu Sengupta; Indrani Dutta
- Music by: Manoj Thakur
- Release date: 20 June 2008
- Country: India
- Language: Bengali

Janatar Aadalat is a 2008 romance-action Bengali film directed by Manoj Thakur based on the story of Shaktipada Rajguru. It stars Jisshu Sengupta and Indrani Dutta in lead roles.

== Plot ==
This is a story of common men rising against oppressive powers and tortures of the local Member of Legislative Assembly.

== Cast ==
- Jisshu Sengupta as Michael
- Indrani Dutta as Rekha
- Sabyasachi Chakraborty as superintendent of police
- Shubhendu Chattopadhyay as Master Mashai
- Monu Mukhopadhyay
- Tapas Paul
- Lily Chakravarty
- Dulal Lahiri
- Ramaprasad Banik
- Sumit Ganguly
- Sunil Mukherjee
- Soma Chakraborty
