= Shunyo E Buke =

- DVD cover
- Directed by: Kaushik Ganguly
- Written by: Kaushik Ganguly
- Screenplay by: Kaushik Ganguly
- Produced by: Forthright media and entertainment
- Starring: Kaushik Sen; Churni Ganguly; Kharaj Mukherjee
- Cinematography: Adinath Das.
- Edited by: Subrata Roy
- Release date: 2005
- Running time: 140 minutes
- Country: India
- Language: Bengali
- Budget: 30lakh

Shunyo E Buke (English: Empty canvas) is a 2005 Bengali drama film directed by Kaushik Ganguly. The film deals with the psyche of men and women and their physical relationship. After making Waarish Ganguly made this second feature film and it did well in Kolkata and was appreciated in few film festivals.

== Plot ==
Saumitra, a brilliant painter and sculptor, visits Khajuraho Group of Monuments to draw inspiration and meets Teesta there through a common friend, Anjit, who is an artist too. Love blossoms between them in Kolkata, and though their family and economic standards are poles apart, they decide to marry. Teesta breaks away from her rich, blue-blood family. On the wedding night, Saumitra, to his shock, discovers that Teesta is flat-chested. The shock develops into a sense of being cheated, anger and finally, hatred. Teesta confides in and seeks advice from Sharmistha di, her boss. When Saumitra arrives, he is turned away. Saumitra draws a diagram one day and shows the shortcomings of Teesta's body to Joydeep, who in turn tells Sujoy and Sujoy to Anjit. Teesta hears about this from Anjit. She asks Saumitro not to make a mockery of her any more and asks for a divorce. A few years later, Saumitro comes across Anjit, Teesta and their daughter. Anijit and Teesta remained in touch and later got married. Teesta tells Saumitro that her husband is quite happy with her despite her physical shortcomings, and they have a happy married life. Saumitra regrets the offences he committed and feels guilty and ashamed.

== Cast ==
- Churni Ganguly as Teesta Mitra
- Kaushik Sen as Saumitra
- Kharaj Mukherjee as Joydeep
- Tota Roy Choudhury as Arijit
- Biswajit Chakraborty
- Rajesh Sharma
- Sudip Mitra

Guest appearance

- Roopa Ganguly as Sharmisthadi
- Soma Dey
- Deepankar De

== Crew ==
- Direction, story, screenplay: Kaushik Ganguly
- Chief assistant directors: Abhijit Chowdhury, Amitava Chakraborty
- Assistant directors: Tarun Chakraborty, Joydeep Mukherjee
- Production: Forthright media and entertainment
- Executive producer: Shaswati Guha Thakurta
- Art direction: Samir Kundu
- Make up: Sekhar Banerjee
- Camera: Adinath Das
- Editing: Subrata Roy
- Background music: Chiradeep Dasgupta
- Music direction: Goutam Banerjee
- Sound recording: Nanda Kishore Ghosh
- Re-recording: Nataraj Manna
- Playback singer: Kharaj Mukherjee
- Stills: Samir Sikdar, Shibhnath Karmakar
- Costume planning: Churni Ganguly
- Calligraphy: Goutam Barat
