= Besharam (2013 film) =

2013 Indian film by Abhinav Kashyap

- Theatrical release poster
- Directed by: Abhinav Kashyap
- Written by: Abhinav Kashyap; Rajeev Barnwal
- Produced by: Himanshu Mehra; Sanjeev Gupta
- Starring: Ranbir Kapoor; Pallavi Sharda; Rishi Kapoor; Neetu Kapoor
- Cinematography: Madhu Vannier
- Edited by: Amitabh Shukla
- Music by: Lalit Pandit
- Production company: Movie Temple Productions
- Distributed by: Reliance Entertainment
- Release date: 2 October 2013
- Running time: 142 minutes
- Country: India
- Language: Hindi
- Budget: ₹83 crore
- Box office: ₹102.85 crore

Besharam (English: Shameless) is a 2013 Indian action comedy film directed by Abhinav Kashyap. The film features Ranbir Kapoor opposite Pallavi Sharda, who marks her return to cinema. Rishi Kapoor, Neetu Kapoor and Javed Jaffrey also feature in the film. Filming for Besharam was scheduled to commence on 10 December 2012, with part of it taking place on a film set in Film City, Mumbai. The film received largely negative reviews upon its release on 2 October 2013.

== Plot ==
Babli (Ranbir Kapoor) is a small-time car thief brought up in an orphanage and manages to charm everybody who knows him. He falls head over heels for Tara Sharma (Pallavi Sharda), whom he met at a wedding, but he is clearly not her type. She insults him when he tries to be oversmart with her. Babli is at the same time being searched for by Inspector Chulbul Chautala (Rishi Kapoor) and Head Constable Bulbul Chautala (Neetu Kapoor). Babli steals a car from outside Tara's office and sells it to a Hawala King Bheem Singh Chandel (Javed Jaffrey). When he finds out that the car belonged to Tara, he offers her to come with him to Chandigarh to get it back from the goon. She agrees to go with him and eventually finds out that her car was stolen by none other than Babli himself. Babli convinces her that he was doing all these petty crimes to support the orphanage kids and will change if given a chance. Later, Babli and Tara steal the car from Chandel and run back to Delhi. On their way home, they find a bag full of hawala cash in the car that belongs to Chandel. Babli decides to keep the money for his orphanage but is later arrested by Chulbul and Bulbul Chautala. Tara gets Babli free by offering them all the money, but discovers that Chandel has tracked them down and kidnapped all the kids in the orphanage. Now Babli and Tara sneak into the Chautala couple's house to steal back the money, only to be confronted by them. Knowing the whole story, the Chautala couple decides to help. Babli goes in with all the cash and negotiates with Chandel to set all the kids free, but just then Chautala barges in with his police force, leading to a shootout. Later, in a one-on-one fight, Babli beats Chandel in black and blue and rescues all the kids. The story ends with the childless Chautala couple deciding to adopt Babli and not let him be a thief anymore.

== Cast ==
- Ranbir Kapoor as Babli
- Pallavi Sharda as Tara Sharma
- Rishi Kapoor as Inspector Chulbul Chautala
- Neetu Kapoor as Head Constable Bulbul Chautala
- Javed Jaffrey as Bheem Singh Chandel
- Amitosh Nagpal as Titu
- Pranay Narayan as Bheem Singh Chandel's right hand
- Himani Shivpuri as Mrs. Sharma, Tara's Mother
- Kamal Kiri as Drug Supplier
- Kunal Agrawal as Ganja
- Gautam Gilhotra as King
- Mohan Kapoor as Lawyer Chaddha
- Remo D'Souza as a dancer in song 'Besharam' (Special Appearance)

== Production ==
Film composer Lalit Pandit confirmed that he was asked to work on the film's soundtrack and that it would consist of six tracks; Pandit also stated that the music was completed in the film's pre-production stages as per the instructions of director Kashyap.

In January 2013, actors Rishi Kapoor and Neetu Singh, parents of actor Ranbir Kapoor, were confirmed as starring in Besharam in unspecified roles.

In April 2013, Kapoor, Kashyap and many in the unit were reported to be shooting at Universal Trade Tower, Sector-49, Sohna Road, Gurgaon (Haryana).

== Soundtrack ==
The soundtrack of Besharam is composed by Lalit Pandit of the famous Jatin–Lalit duo and the lyrics are penned by Rajeev Barnwal, Nikhat Khan and Himanshu Kishan Mehra. The soundtrack, originally slated for a 14 August 2013 release, was released on 26 August 2013 via CD and MP3 sites. The song "Love Ki Ghanti" was released as a single track on MP3 sites in the beginning. The tune of "Love Ki Ghanti" has been lifted from an Italian folk song called "Bella ciao". Later, the official soundtrack of the film was released on the website of T-Series. The intro of Tere Mohalle Remix Version was copied from Korean song "Gentleman" by PSY.

| No. | Title | Singer(s) | Length |
|---|---|---|---|
| 1. | "Besharam" | Shree D, Ishq Bector | 3:38 |
| 2. | "Tere Mohalle" | Mamta Sharma, Aishwarya Nigam | 4:31 |
| 3. | "Love Ki Ghanti" | Ranbir Kapoor, Sujeet Shetty, Amitosh Nagpal | 3:39 |
| 4. | "Dil Ka Jo Haal Hai" | Abhijeet Bhattacharya, Shreya Ghoshal | 5:02 |
| 5. | "Tu Hai" | Sonu Nigam, Shreya Ghoshal | 6:50 |
| 6. | "Aa Re Aa Re" | Mika Singh, Shreya Ghoshal | 4:26 |
| 7. | "Tu Hai" (Unplugged) | Sonu Nigam, Bela Shende | 4:21 |
| 8. | "Besharam" (Remix) | Shree D, Ishq Bector | 4:03 |
| 9. | "Tere Mohalle" (Remix) | Mamta Sharma, Aishwarya Nigam | 4:13 |
| 10. | "Love Ki Ghanti" (Remix) | Ranbir Kapoor, Sujeet Shetty, Amitosh Nagpal | 3:39 |
| 11. | "Dil Kaa Jo Haal Hai" (Remix) | Abhijeet Bhattacharya, Shreya Ghoshal | 4:31 |
| 12. | "Aa Re Aa Re" (Remix) | Mika Singh, Shreya Ghoshal | 4:45 |
| 13. | "Chal Hand Uthake Nachche" | Daler Mehndi, Mika Singh, Sunidhi Chauhan | 3:31 |

== Marketing ==
Besharam was promoted extensively on TV shows like Comedy Nights with Kapil, Kaun Banega Crorepati, Jhalak Dikhla Jaa, and also many reality shows etc. Ranbir and Pallavi also promoted the film in New York with Diwali Bash at Times Square and in London and Dubai.

== Pre-release revenue ==
=== Pre-release business ===
Besharam Pre-release business
| Territories and ancillary revenues | Price |
|---|---|
| Satellite rights with a Zee TV channel | ₹20 crore (US$2.1 million) |
| Distribution rights worldwide | ₹80 crore (US$8.3 million) |
| Audio rights | ₹10 crore (US$1.0 million) |
| Print and Advertising costs (P&A) | ₹20 crore (US$2.1 million) |
| Total | ₹130 crore (US$14 million) |

- The figures include the Print and Advertising (P&A) costs.

== Release ==
Besharam released on around 3600 screens in India and 700 screens overseas on 2 October 2013 (Wednesday), making it the second biggest release in Hindi film history to date, behind Chennai Express which had 3700 screens in India and 700 plus screens abroad, according to Box Office India. Utpal Acharya, Distribution Head of Reliance Entertainment said that they had planned for a release on 4000 screens, but Pawan Kalyan's Telugu film Atharintiki Daaredi, released on 27 September 2013, received a phenomenal response in advance booking and occupied some screens which they had planned in Andhra Pradesh, Tamil Nadu, Karnataka and Kerala for Besharam. Besharam had a shooting budget of ₹60 crore (US$6.3 million) plus the cost of promotions, marketing and advertising of ₹18 crore (US$1.9 million) approx. The total investment on film was around ₹85 crore (US$8.9 million).

== Critical reception ==
Besharam received generally negative reviews from critics.

Taran Adarsh of Bollywood Hungama gave it 1.5 stars out of 5 and stated that the film proves the adage "'All that glitters is not gold' is absolutely right. The film is a huge disappointment."

Mohar Basu of Koimoi gave it 1.5 stars out of 5 and felt that "Besharam has too many shortcomings and lacks the ravishing junk delight of calamitous ending that commercial flicks usually generate".

Sarit Ray of the Hindustan Times described Besharam as "a senseless saga of shamelessness" and rated it only half a star out of 5, describing it further as: "[T]he cinematic equivalent of a dinner made with leftovers. There is a bit of everything, nothing is exactly fresh, and in the end, you're left wondering if it was wise to have chucked it all in together. Except, in this case, it isn't home-cooked food, but a meal you must pay for."

Mohammad Kamran Jawaid of Dawn gave the film a mixed review writing that "it is apparent that Mr. Kashyap wanted a slickly made conventional blockbuster, and therefore relies on a mixture of tired and inflexible elements the audience is known to respond to". He continues further that "if Mr. Kashyap would have concentrated on keeping "Besharam" original, then it would have been a far better enterprise. Right here, right now, it's kinda lame, but not despicable or detestable as the title suggests".

In a rare positive review, Madhureeta Mukherjee of The Times of India rated it 3.5 of 5 stars and posited that the director "relies on the sheer 3K (read: Kapoors) power to entertain."

== Box office ==
=== India ===
Besharam opened to an excellent response on its opening day, recording 90 percent occupancies in theatres. However, due to a negative critical response, the film managed to collect ₹195 million (US$2.0 million), falling short of its expected ₹250 million (US$2.6 million) figure. The film witnessed a huge drop of nearly 60–70 percent on its second day, dropping hugely on Thursday to gross a domestic nett of just ₹65.0 million (US$680,000). The film fell a further 15 percent on Friday, grossing ₹57.5 million (US$600,000). The film collected ₹315 million (US$3.3 million) over its opening weekend, which was much less than expected by the production company. The film grossed nett Rs. 57.5 million on Saturday. Besharam had a poor extended five-day weekend of ₹ 440 million. It had a first week (7 days) collection of ₹ 540 million which was only the seventh highest of 2013. The film grossed around ₹ 575.4 million nett in its extended nine-day first week.

=== Overseas ===
The film earned US$1.7 million in its opening weekend. Besharam grossed $2.2 million in overseas markets in its first five days (extended weekend), which was termed "below the mark". It was fourth in the list of top weekend openings of the year behind Chennai Express, YJHD and Race 2.
