= Aadhaar (2019 film) =

Indian Hindi-language film directed by Suman Ghosh

- Theatrical release poster
- Directed by: Suman Ghosh
- Written by: Suman Ghosh; Amitosh Nagpal
- Produced by: Manish Mundra
- Starring: Vineet Kumar Singh; Raghubir Yadav; Saurabh Shukla; Sanjay Mishra
- Cinematography: Ravi Kiran Ayyagari
- Edited by: Bodhaditya Banerjee
- Music by: Shantanu Moitra
- Production companies: Drishyam Films; Jio Studios
- Distributed by: UFO Moviez
- Release date: 3 October 2019 (Busan)
- Country: India
- Language: Hindi

Aadhaar is a 2019 Indian Hindi-language dramedy film directed by Suman Ghosh. The film is written by Amitosh Nagpal and Suman Ghosh. Amitosh has also written dialogues and lyrics for the film. Produced by Manish Mundra under his banner Drishyam Films, the film stars Vineet Kumar Singh, who is the first one in his village to get his Aadhaar card made. Raghubir Yadav, Saurabh Shukla and Sanjay Mishra appear in supporting roles. The film had its premiere at the 24th Busan International Film Festival under the section 'A Window on Asian Cinema'. It was supposed to be released in India this 5 February 2021, but it was postponed.

== Synopsis ==
The film revolves around Pharsua, a resident of the village of Jamua, and his aadhaar (resident identification) card ID, issued by the Indian government. Villagers are suspicious that the government will collect their information and monitor them, so they show no interest in the new ID card despite the benefits that accrue to ID cardholders. Pharsua volunteers and he becomes the first person in the village to receive the new aadhaar card and is a star. But one day, the village priest predicts that the serial number on his ID card will soon cause the death of his wife, and Pharsua starts on a journey to save his wife. Now getting his ID number changed is of utmost importance to him, but it becomes an inviolable and unchangeable absolute number since it has been entered into the system. Pharsua wails about the unfairness of his ID number, but no one outside of his village listens to his pleas.

== Cast ==
- Vineet Kumar Singh as Pharsua
- Sanjay Mishra as Shastri
- Saurabh Shukla as Parmanand Singh
- Raghubir Yadav as Ghisu
- Alka Amin as Rani's Mother
- Ekavali Khanna as Mrs.Dahiya
- Vishwanath Chatterjee as Minister
- Prithvi Hatte as Rani
- Prem Prakash Modi as Rani's Father
- Ishtiyak Khan as Rastogi
- Bachan Pachera as Santram

== Production ==
Ghosh, a director who has made films in Bengali cinema, said that he had several stories that will have "no takers in Bangla cinema." In 2011, he read an article about the Aadhaar Card on The New York Times, which triggered the idea of the film and he wrote a synopsis. Ghosh sent the synopsis of Aadhaar to the co-production market of the Busan International Film Festival which was eventually selected in 2016. The film was shot in Jharkhand in December 2018 to January. The shooting wrapped in February 2019.
