= Animesh quartet =

Novel series

The Animesh quartet is a series of four novels by the Indian Bengali writer Samaresh Majumdar. The principal character of the series is Animesh Mitra who, much like the author himself, grows up amid the tea estates of the Dooars in northern Bengal, but then moves to Kolkata in the 1960s in order to study at Scottish Church College. Animesh then plunges into the Naxalite rebellion that rocked West Bengal in the late 1960s and 1970s. Through the character of the protagonist, Majumdar portrays the tumultuous political history of West Bengal in the post-independence era.

The first three novels in the series - Uttoradhikar, Kalbela and Kalpurush - were published between 1979 and 1989. Kalbela was serialized in the prestigious literary magazine Desh in 1981-1982, and won the Sahitya Akademi Prize in 1984. The last book in the series Mousholkal was published in 2013, after a gap of nearly 25 years, as a response to the rise of Mamata Banerjee and the Trinamool Congress. The Animesh series is widely regarded as Samaresh Majumdar's finest work, as well as being one of the most significant works of modern Bengali literature.

== Adaptation ==
Kalbela was filmed as Kaalbela by the director Goutam Ghose in 2009 with Parambrata Chattopadhyay in the role of Animesh and Paoli Dam as Madhabilata. Kalpurush and Uttoradhikar were also released as TV series.

== Works ==
- Uttoradhikar (The Inheritance)
- Kalbela
- Kalpurush (A Man of Our Time)
- Mousholkal (The Age of Iron)
