= Animesh Ray =

Social Worker

Animesh Ray is a professor of computational and molecular biology at Keck Graduate Institute.

== Early life ==
Animesh Ray was born in a suburb of Calcutta (now Kolkata), which used to be a French colony in India, to parents both of whom had their ancestral homes in East Bengal (now Bangladesh). He studied in a Bengali medium high school, and then at Presidency College (now Presidency University). After his undergraduate studies, he went to Jawaharlal Nehru University in New Delhi, to obtain a Master of Science in the new School of Life Sciences. He obtained his Ph.D. in microbial genetics from Monash University. From 1984 to 1988 he was a postdoctoral researcher in the Institute of Molecular Biology at the University of Oregon, Eugene, USA, in the laboratory of Professor Franklin W. Stahl. He was a postdoctoral fellow at the Department of Biology of the Massachusetts Institute of Technology (MIT) from 1989 to 1991, in the laboratory of Professor Ethan Signer. From 1991 to 1995 he was an assistant professor at University of Rochester and then was its associate professor from 1996 to 2001. He joined Keck Graduate Institute as a professor in 2001. From 2001 to 2004 he was also an adjunct professor at the University of California, San Diego and during the same years was a visiting professor at the University of Rochester. In 2009 he became a visiting professor at Institute for Systems Biology and University of Hyderabad and currently works as director of Ph.D. programs at Keck Graduate Institute as well as the Center for Network Studies. Since 2009, he also has been an adjunct professor at the Center for Computational Sciences, San Diego State University, San Diego, and at the School of Mathematical Sciences at the Claremont Graduate University in Claremont, California.

== Career ==
Since 1985 Animesh Ray has studied the mechanisms of DNA recombination. In 1989 Animesh Ray published on mechanisms of homologous recombination induced by a DNA double-strand break using HIS3 gene of Saccharomyces cerevisiae and suggested that its chromosomes produce double chain break during DNA recombination.

From 1995 to 2002, he conducted research on computing with DNA. In May 1997 he and Mitsunori Ogihara discovered DNA based computers can perform massively parallel computations.

In June 1997 Animesh Ray suggested that gametophyte is responsible for pollen tube guidance but also mentioned that it might be indirectly accomplished.

In 2002 he studied ovule of Arabidopsis thaliana and discovered a new type of gene regulation, involving post-transcriptional gene silencing, through a gene called DCL1 which is required for RNA silencing all multicellular organisms, including plants, in Drosophila and Caenorhabditis.

In 2007 he and his students used Arabidopsis thaliana to track a footprint of broken DNA and suggested that the genes move from one locus to another.

In 2011 he suggested that microRNA gene, miR-34b can be of use to diagnose melanoma.

== Awards ==
Animesh Ray has had numerous awards from the National Science Foundation since 1993, which include an over three million dollar research award in 2002 from the division of Computing and Communication Foundation (CCF), and a year 2005 award for over $4.8 million on a project within the Frontiers in Biological Research (FIBR) program of NSF. In 2009 Animesh Ray and Ali Nadim were awarded $100,000 grant from the National Science Foundation. Dr. Animesh Ray was awarded the NIH Director's award for innovative research in 2021 .
