= Kaalbela =

2009 Indian Bengali film

- Poster of movie kaalbela
- Directed by: Goutam Ghose
- Written by: Samaresh Majumdar
- Produced by: Doordarshan; Prasar Bharati
- Starring: Parambrata Chatterjee; Paoli Dam; Santu Mukherjee; Soumitra Chatterjee
- Cinematography: Bijay Anand; Goutam Ghose
- Edited by: Shuvro Roy
- Music by: Goutam Ghose
- Distributed by: NFDC
- Release date: 16 January 2009
- Running time: 175 minutes
- Country: India
- Language: Bengali

Kaalbela (transl. Calcutta My Love) is a 2009 Bengali film directed by Goutam Ghose. The film stars Parambrata Chatterjee, Paoli Dam, Soumitra Chatterjee and Santu Mukherjee.

This film is set against the background of the Naxalite movement. Based on a 1980s novel by Samaresh Majumdar, the film sets itself up, quite self-consciously, within a certain tradition of films, namely radical political Bengali cinema of the 1970s and 1980s. It thus establishes an intertextuality and a certain connection with them. By situating itself and the story it has to tell, within this matrix of the 1970s radical Bengali cinema, Ghose anchors the film squarely within that time. The mood and the events certainly, but even the way black and white shots are used, underlines a somewhat documentary – and thus temporally limited – way these sequences are put to use. The film received a mixed response at the Indian box office.

== Plot ==
Animesh Mitra is simpleton who arrives at Calcutta from Jalpaiguri, during hostile times (1967), to study at the Scottish Church College. He is scheduled to take refuge at the residence of his father's friend Mr. Debabrata, but he accidentally gets shot in the limb and ends up at the Calcutta Medical College. Eventually things move on and Animesh develops a deep friendship with Debabrata's daughter Neela. He takes admission in the B.A classes of Scottish Church College on Bengali Literature and ultimately becomes intertwined with the unresting times of the youth intellect.

Though he tried to keep himself away from politics but, he turns to become a Communist under the mentorship of Ramen and Subash Sen, but after a year he feels that their party (B.P.S.F) has been deviating from the ideals of building up an egalitarian society. With the idealistic ideas of Subhash Sen and others Animesh rediscover himself as a hardcore Naxalite, rampaging the interiors of northern West Bengal. In the meantime Animesh is torn between his ideals and his love (Madhabilata). Earlier, Madhabilata( a friend of Neela) opposed the ideals that Animesh believes, but she promised that she will never become a barrier to his mission. Madhabilata gets pregnant out of wedlock while Animesh abandons her for greater idealism. Animesh's roommate, the unquenchable poet Tridip, accompanies him with a dreamy vision of a noncompartmentalized nation. But outrageous planning leads the Naxalite movement to be a tragic demise.

Subash Sen and other leaders get slaughtered by the brutal Congressian Police. Tridip is shot dead and the girls who are arrested in charge of spreading the ideals of Naxalism, are raped by the police officers and Animesh is tortured by the state to such an extent that he becomes crippled. His nervous systems (below and from the hips) breaks down completely, making him a man who can sit and stagger. Madhabilata gives birth to a baby boy (Arka). Neela stands beside Madhabilata like a wall and delivers immense support, though her husband refuses to stretch out his helping hand. Finally in 1977, the Left Front Government decides to release every political prisoner; a devastated Animesh comes out from jail custody after meeting minister Sudip (his compatriot during his days at the Calcutta University). The film ends with silver lining when Animesh unites with his estranged family in a slum (wife and son) with nothing to vie for but with a spark of hope against aghast capitalism and return to mainstream with a new ideology.

== Cast ==
- Parambrata Chatterjee as Animesh Mitra
- Paoli Dam as Madhabilata
- Soumitra Chatterjee as Saritsekhar Mitra, Animesh's grandfather
- Santu Mukhopadhyay as Mahitosh Mitra, Animesh's father
- Rudranil Ghosh as Tridib
- Bratya Basu as Ramen (Biman in the original story)
- Shantilal Mukherjee as Subhash Sen
- Mousumi Saha as Animesh's step-mother
- Partha Banerjee
- Anandi Ghose as Neela
- Anirban Guha
- Chhanda Chatterjee
- Saron Datta
