= Amitosh Nagpal =

Indian actor (born 1984)

- Born: 22 October 1984 (age 41); Hisar, Haryana, India
- Occupations: Actor, Film Director, Screenwriter, Lyricist

Amitosh Nagpal (born 22 October 1984) is an Indian actor, screenwriter and lyricist, known for his role in Besharam.

== Early life ==
Amitosh Nagpal was born in a Punjabi family in Hisar, Haryana in 1984. Amitosh has to his credit many accomplishments. To name a few, he is a lyricist in the film Oye Lucky, Lucky Oyes – rap "ABCD chahida mainu" and "Superchor", for which he was nominated for a national award apart from writing the lyrics for the song "Jugni" as well. He has also penned quite a few memorable jingles in the advertising world. He also wrote dialogues for the Hindi Feature film 'Hindi Medium' He has himself directed and acted in plays. Amitosh has acted in many television commercials and portrayed intense roles in films like Dabangg and Rangrezz, while his role in Besharam is on the lighter side. He has acted in a television series called Powder and films like Phillum City and Aarakshan.

One of his most-talked about works has been as an actor and translator of a play titled Piya Behrupiya – a musical adaptation in Hindi of William Shakespeare's best known romantic comedies Twelfth Night, in which he enacted the role of Sebastian. Critically acclaimed – nationally and internationally, the show went on to become a resounding success and Amitosh entertained everyone with his repertoire, charm and wit. The play was commissioned for The Globe to Globe Festival, which took place at the Globe theater in London, and it played to packed houses. The play, though adapted, has an originality of its own and befits the Nautanki (a folk performance tradition from North India) style of the performance. Amitosh says: "Performing on the floor where the great William Shakespeare himself performed was a different high…one of the greatest joys that any theater actor can feel!".

== Filmography ==
Year	Film	Role	Notes	References
2010	Dabangg	Sumant Kumar		
2010	Phillum City	Casio		
2011	Aarakshan	Pandit ji		
2013	Rangrezz	Vinod		
2013	Besharam	Titu		
2014	Gulaab Gang		Dialogue	
2015	For Here or to Go?		Actor	
2017	Hindi Medium		Dialogue Writer	
2017	Panchlait	Godhan	Actor	
2019	Aadhaar		Writer	
2021	Saina		Writer	
2021	Sardar Ka Grandson		Writer	
