= Nirbashito =

- Film poster
- Directed by: Churni Ganguly
- Music by: Raja Narayan Deb
- Release date: December 2014
- Running time: 108 mins
- Country: India
- Language: Bengali

Nirbashito (transl. exiled) is a 2014 Bengali-language film directed by Churni Ganguly. The music of the film was composed by Raja Narayan Deb. The film was India's Oscar nomination in the category "Best foreign film" in 2015.

== Plot ==
The protagonist of the film is a female writer who has been banished from her own country for writing against religious fundamentalism. The film shows the relationship between her and her cat "Baghini".

== Cast ==
- Churni Ganguly as a Woman
- Saswata Chatterjee as Pritam
- Arindol Bagchi as Anukul
- Raima Sen as Shayonti
- Ardhendu Banerjee as Shayonti's Father
- Dipankar Dey as Chief Minister
- Chitravanu Basu as Kalidas
- Dipanjan Basu as Identity Verification officer
- Lars Bethke as Lucas
- Naomi Bethke as Girl in Apple Orchard.
- Gautam Bhattacharya as Journalist in School library
- Kishore Bhimani as Mr. Goenka
- Sanjay Biswas as Consulate Stuff
- Lia Boysen as Wilma
- Biplab Chatterjee as Moti
- Balmiki Chattopadhyay as Debu
- Kheya Chattopadhyay as Courier Service Assistant
- Shruti Das as Girl Crying for mother
- Rajorshi Dey as Manibul
- Kaushik Ganguly as Jayanta
- Rajat Ganguly as Chanchal
- Abhimanyu Mukherjee Television Journalist
- Parna Ghatak as Vet
- Joakim Granberg as Theo
- Christer Holmgren as Swedish Ambassador
- Yohanna Idha as Reporter
- Christoffer L Jonsson as Swedish Security Official 1
- Bharat Kaul as Vikram Ehsas.
- Eric Krogh as Bodyguard
- Debmalya Maulik as Newsreader
- Arun Mukherjee as Amal Majumdar
- Ashok Mukherjee as Courier Service Stuff
- Sumanta Mukherjee as Commissioner of Police
- Samita Saha as Maid for Baghini
- Martin Wallström as Gustav
- Shazi Özdemir as Liliana
- Lennart B. Sandelin as Protester

== Awards ==
The film received the following awards:

- Best Bengali film - 2015 - 62nd National Film Awards, India
- Best film at Delhi International Film Festival - 2014
