= Monu Mukherjee =

Indian Bengali film and television actor (1930–2020)

- Born: Sourendra Mohan Mukherjee; 1 March 1930; Calcutta, Bengal Presidency, British India
- Died: 6 December 2020 (aged 90); Kolkata, West Bengal, India
- Occupation: Actor
- Years active: 1958–2020
- Known for: "Machlibaba" in Joy Baba Felunath
- Children: 2

Sourendra Mohan Mukherjee (1 March 1930 – 6 December 2020), known as Monu Mukherjee, was an Indian actor who worked in Bengali language films and television serials. In 1958, he became a prompter. His first acting assignment was in the play Khudha, and his first film was Mrinal Sen's 1958 film Neel Akasher Neechey (transl. Under the Blue Sky). He had worked with directors like Satyajit Ray and Ronand Joffy. He is remembered for his portrayal of Machhli Baba in 1979 film Joi Baba Felunath.

== Early life and education ==
Manu Mukherjee was born on March 1, 1930. He was the son of Amarendranath Mukherjee, who was also involved with acting at the Calcutta Theatre. Manu Mukherjee was one of the oldest actors in the world, still actively playing major and minor roles in Bengali television's soaps and operas.

Manu started acting at an young age, and with his first character he portrayed the role of a wife at a neighborhood club play which fueled his fascination towards acting. He joined the Srirangam Theatre (known as Bishwarupa Movie Theater since 2001) as a prompter in the year 1957. He also worked in other famous theatres from the late sixties onward such as Sarkarina, Sujata Sadan, Minerva, Bishwanath Mancha, Rangmahal, and Star theatre. His first notable part was when he had to act as an artist instead of Kali Banerjee in the play Khudha. He was also trained as a Tabla player by the famous Tabla player Krishnakumar Ganguly also known as Natubabu.

== Films and television and web series ==
=== Films ===
- Sudama The Half Man (unreleased)
- Neel Akasher Neechey (1959)
- Uttarayan (1963)
- Shesh Theke Shuru (1969)
- Nayikar Bhumikay (1972)
- Marjina Abdullah (1973)
- Sonar Khancha (1973)
- Ashani Sanket (1973)
- Phuleswari (1974)
- Mrigayaa (1976)
- Safed Jhoot (1977)
- Ganadevata (1979)
- Joi Baba Felunath (1979)
- Dadar Kirti (1980)
- Saheb (1981)
- Meghmukti (1982)
- Khelar Putul (1982)
- Iman Kalyan (1982)
- Pratidan (1983)
- Srimati Hangsaraj (1989)
- Sati (1990)
- Ganashatru (1990)
- Sajani Go Sajani (1991)
- Swet Patharer Thala (1992)
- Kancher Prithibi (1993)
- Tobu Mone Rekho (1994)
- Damu (1997)
- Siraj (1999)
- Anu (1999)
- Sajoni Aamar Sohag (2000)
- Nodir Pare Aamar Bari (2001)
- Dukhiram (2002)
- Desh (2002)
- Chandramollika (2002)
- Abaidha (2002)
- Patalghar (2003)
- Raju Uncle (2005)
- Sedin Dujone (2008)
- Janatar Aadalat (2008)
- Sakaler Rang (2009)
- Eka Eka (2010)
- Bondhu Eso Tumi (2010)
- Banshiwala (2010)
- Purna Brahma Sri Sri Harichand (2011)
- Bhorer Pakhi (2011)
- Egaro (2011)
- Sparsho (2012)
- Keu Bole Buro Bham, Keu Bole (2012)
- Holud Pakhir Dana (2013)
- Bangal Ghoti Phataphati (Unreleased)
- Bakita Byaktigato
- "Goynar Baksho"
- Sudama The Half Man By Rajib Ball (Unreleased expecting by 2013 May)
- Alinagarer Golokdhadha (2018)
- Loafer (Upcoming)
- Debdoot Sheet (Upcoming)

=== Television ===
- "Poush Faguner Pala (DD Bangla)
- "Sri Ramkrishna" (DD Bangla)
- Mama Bhagne (ATN Bangla)
- Aparajito (Star Jalsha)
- Boyei Gelo (Zee Bangla)
- Neel Seemana (Zee Bangla)
- Sansaar Sukher Hoy Romonir Gune (Star Jalsha)
- Neel Seemana (Zee Bangla)

=== Web series ===
- Makorshar Rosh ArthamAnartham (2017, Hoichoi)

== Death ==
Mukherjee died on 6 December 2020 around 9:35 A.M in Kolkata. He was 90 years old. He had been suffering from chronic heart problems.
