= Phanishwar Nath Renu =

Indian writer and activist (1921–1977)

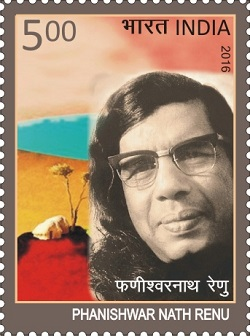
- Born: 4 March 1921; Araria, Bihar, India
- Died: 11 April 1977 (aged 56)
- Education: Kashi Hindu Vishvavidyalay
- Occupations: Novelist, memoirist
- Spouses: Rekha, Padma and Latika Renu
- Children: Kavita Roy, Padam Parag Venu, Navneeta, Aparajit, Dakshineshwar Prasad Rai
- Writing career
- Notable works: Maila Anchal (The Soiled Linen, 1954)
- Father: Sheela Nath Mandal

Phanishwar Nath Mandal 'Renu' (4 March 1921 – 11 April 1977) was one of the most successful and influential writers of modern Hindi literature in the post-Premchand era. He is the author of Maila Anchal, which after Premchand's Godaan, is regarded as the most significant Hindi novel. Phanishwar Nath (Mandal) Renu was born on 4 March 1921 in a small village Aurahi Hingna near Simraha railway station in Bihar. The mandal community of Bihar to which Renu belonged constitutes an under-privileged social group in India. Renu's family, however, enjoyed the benefits of land, education, and social prestige. Renu's father, Shilanath Mandal, had been active in the Indian National Movement and was an extremely enlightened individual, taking a keen interest in modern ideas, culture and art.

Phanishwar Nath Renu is best known for promoting the voice of the contemporary rural India through the genre of Aanchalik Upanyas ('regional story'), and is placed amongst the pioneering Hindi writers who brought regional voices into the mainstream Hindi literature. Renu was very close associate of Bengali novelist Satinath Bhaduri. He wrote a memoirs named Bhaduriji (Mr. Bhaduri) in Bengali.

His short story "Maare Gaye Gulfam" was adapted into a film Teesri Kasam (The Third Vow), by Basu Bhattacharya (produced by the poet-lyricist Shailendra) in 1966 for which he also wrote the dialogues. Later his short story "Panchlight" (Petromax) was made into a TV short film. The 2017 Bollywood Film Panchlait is also based on this short story.

== Biography ==
Phanishwar Nath Renu was born on 4 March 1921 at village Aurahi Hingna near Forbesganj, in Araria district (then Purnia district), Bihar. He was educated in India and Nepal. His primary education was held in Araria and Forbesganj. He did his Matriculation from Biratnagar Adarsh Vidyalaya (school), Biratnagar, Nepal while staying with the Koirala Family. After passing out IA from Kashi Hindu Vishvavidyalay (university) in 1942 he took part in the Indian Freedom Struggle. Later he participated in the Nepali revolutionary movement in 1950 which resulted in the establishment of democracy in Nepal. He ushered in the Anchalik-katha of Hindi writing. He had a very close friendship with Sachchidananda Hirananda Vatsyayana Agyey - his contemporary poet. A biography on the writer has also been produced with the name: Phanishwar Nath Renu in Unki Nazar Unka Shahar.

== Writing style ==
His first novel which is also considered his masterpiece, Maila Anchal (The Soiled Linen, 1954), was a social novel that depicted the life of rural Bihar and its people, especially the backward and the deprived. He was subsequently awarded one of India's highest civilian honours, the Padma Sri in 1970. He returned the Padma Sri in protest of the proclamation of Internal Emergency.

== Literary works ==
=== Novels ===
- Maila Anchal
- Parti Parikatha
- Juloos
- Krishay ki Kahani
- Kitne Chaurahe
- Paltu Babu Road
- Is Jal Pralay Main

=== Memoirs ===
- Rinjal Dhanjal
- Van Tulsi ki Gandh
- Nepali Kranti Katha
- Shrut Ashrut Purva
- Totapur

=== Story ===
- Panchlight

== Personal life ==
He married three times, first wife was Rekha Renu (unknown person), second was Padma, and the third Latika (d. 2011). He met his third wife Latika, a nurse, while he was admitted at Patna Medical College and Hospital. They married in 1951. She has been the inspiration behind Maila Anchal, Parti Parikatha and Mare Gaye Gulfam. His elder daughter Kavita Roy (Rekha Renu's daughter) was reported to be living in poor condition in Katihar, Bihar. Padma Renu's son Padma Parag Renu remained an MLA from Forbesganj, while younger son, Dakhineshwar Renu, ran an organization, Renu Samaj Seva Sansthan.
