= Samaresh Majumdar =

Indian Bengali writer (1944–2023)

Samares Mazumdar
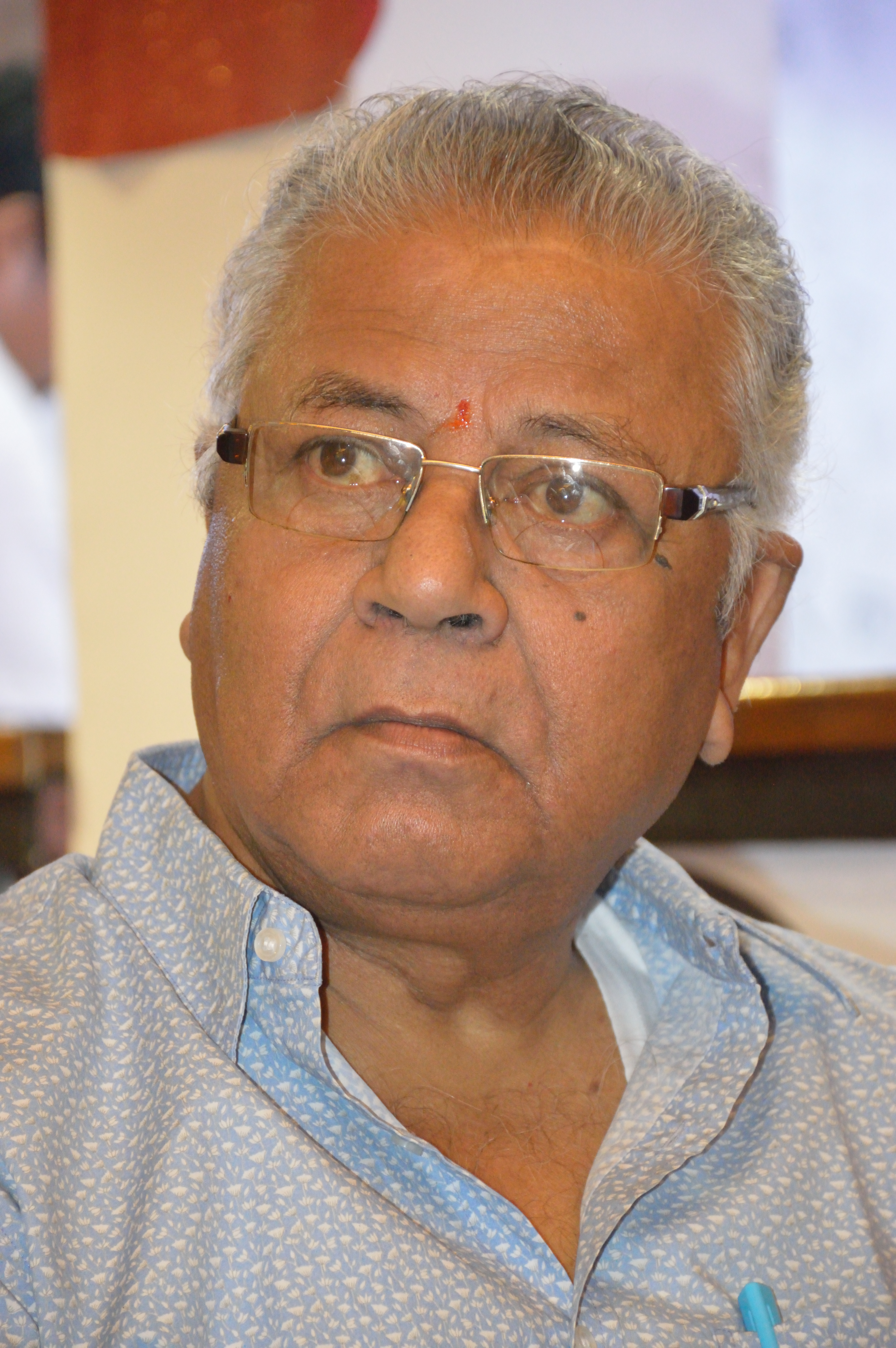
- Majumder in 2015
- Born: 10 March 1944; Gairkata, Jalpaiguri district, British India
- Died: 8 May 2023 (aged 79); Kolkata, West Bengal, India
- Education: Scottish Church College; University of Calcutta
- Occupation: Writer
- Notable work: Uttaradhikar, Kalbela, Kalpurush, Garbhadharini, Singhabahini, Kolikatay Nabakumar
- Website: www.astrainfotech.in/samaresmazumdar/

Signature
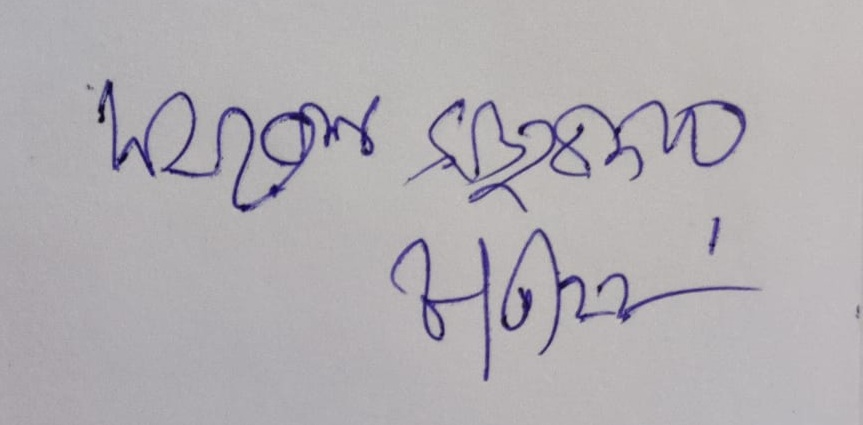

Samaresh Majumdar (10 March 1944 – 8 May 2023) was an Indian Bengali language writer from West Bengal.

== Early life and education ==
Majumdar was born on 10 March 1944 in Gairkata, Jalpaiguri district in the then British India. He spent his childhood years in the tea gardens of Dooars, Gairkata in Jalpaiguri district, West Bengal, India. He was a student of the Jalpaiguri Zilla School, Jalpaiguri. He completed his bachelor's degree in Bengali literature from Scottish Church College in Kolkata and his master's degree in Bengali Literature from University of Calcutta. His first story appeared in Desh literary magazine in 1967. Dour ("Run") was his first novel, which was published in Desh in 1976. He was associated with the Ananda Publishers.

== Genre ==
Majumdar was best known for his Animesh series of novels, the second of which (Kalbela) won the Sahitya Akademi Award in 1984. He was also known for creating the detective character Arjun, who is the central character of the 2013 film Arjun – Kalimpong E Sitaharan. The Bengali film Buno Haansh is also based on his novel of the same name, which was published in Pujabarshiki Anondolok. Majumdar was a versatile writer, and many of his novels contain elements of suspense. His novels include Aath Kuthuri Noy Daraja, Bandinibash, Daybadhha, Buno Haansher Palak, and Saatkahon. Majumdar worked on short stories, novels, travelogues and children's fiction. His quartet of Uttoradhikar, Kalbela, Kalpurush, and Mousalkal is now considered as a modern classic.

== Death ==
Majumdar died after being hospitalised for COPD complications in Kolkata, on 8 May 2023, at the age of 79.

== Notable characters ==
- Animesh and Madhabilata (Uttaradhikar, Kaalbela, Kalpurush and Mousholkaal)
- Arjun - the sleuth cum science fiction character. The first movie based upon the early adventures of Arjun is Arjun – Kalimpong E Sitaharan, released on 3 May 2013.
- Dipaboli, a striking main character of Saatkahon
- Arka - son of Animesh; in Kalpurush and Moushalkal

== Works ==
- Dour
- Uttaradhikar
- Kaalbela
- Kalpurush
- Mousholkal
- Garbhodharini
- Aattiyoswajan
- Ani
- Aath Kuthuri Noy Daraja
- Harinbari
- Janajajok
- Boro Paap Hey
- Ujangonga
- Lokkhir Pachali
- Showar
- Unish Bish
- Shatkahon
- Aabash
- Shoronagoto
- Ferari
- Din Jay Rat Jay
- Bondinibash
- Buno Haansh
- Nikotkotha
- Sroddhanjali
- Anuprobesh
- Kulokundolini
- "Aath Kuthuri Noy Daraja"
- Ora ebong oder maayera
- Haaramir haatbaksho
- Takapoysa
- Ei ami renu
- Teerthojaatri
- Bile paani nei
- Panchti Rohosyo Uponyas
- Kosto Kosto Sukh
- Istition
- Manusher Ma
- Buker bhetor Bangladesh
- Dow Dow Agun
- Kathkoilar Agun
- Kolikatay Nabakumar
- Calcuttay Nabakumar
- Filmstar Nabakumar

=== Young adults ===
- Khutimari Range
- Khunkharapi
- Kalimpong e Sitaharan
- Chandigarh e Gandogol
- Lighter
- Dwitiyo Lighter
- Tingchuk Monerstery r Hire
- Hangorer Pete Hire
- Jutoy Rokter Daag
- Derdin
- Rotnogorbha
- Kalapahar
- Barofe Payer Chap
- Arjun Ebaar Kolkata e
- Macsaheber Natni
- Arjun Beriye Elo
- Ghumghumer Senbari
- Carvalhor Baxo
- Arjun @ bip bip dotcom
- Yeatir Atmio
- Ekmukhi Rudrakha
- Keo Bojhe Na
- Dracullar Sondhane Arjun
- Joyontir Jongole
- Teen Jaliyat Ebong Ek Mithyebadi
- Dindupure Ratdupur
- Nababganjer Narakhadak
- Phule Bisher Gondho
- Bishalyakarani
- Manush Pachar
- Lobonhrod Londobhondo
- Samannandan Yamnandan
- Sitahoron Rohosyo
- Hisebe Bhul Chilo
- Mushkil Asan
- Dasbangsho Dhangsho
- Arjun Samagra (1-6)
- Arjun Ebaar Chilapatay
- Khiljir Guhay Arjun
- Roshataler Rahasya
- Arjun Ebaar Bangladeshe
- Lakh Takar Pathor
- Dui Dike Ak Arjun
- Arjuner Pratidwandi
- Adim Andhakare Arjun
- Arjun Ebaar New York e

== Awards ==
- Banga Bibhushan Samman awarded by Government of West Bengal: 2018
- ABP Ananda "Sera Bangali": 2018
- Bankim Puroshkar for Kolikataye Nobokumar: 2009
- Sahitya Akademi Award for Kalbela: 1984
- Ananda Purashkar: 1982
- Bengal Film Journalists' Association Award, Dishari and Chalachchitra Prasar Samity – Best Script Writer: 1982

== Adaptation in Movies ==
- Kaalbela
- Arjun: Kalimpong E Sitaharan
- Buno Haansh
- Jaalbandi
