= Maila Anchal =

1954 novel by Phanishwar Nath Renu

Maila Aanchaal
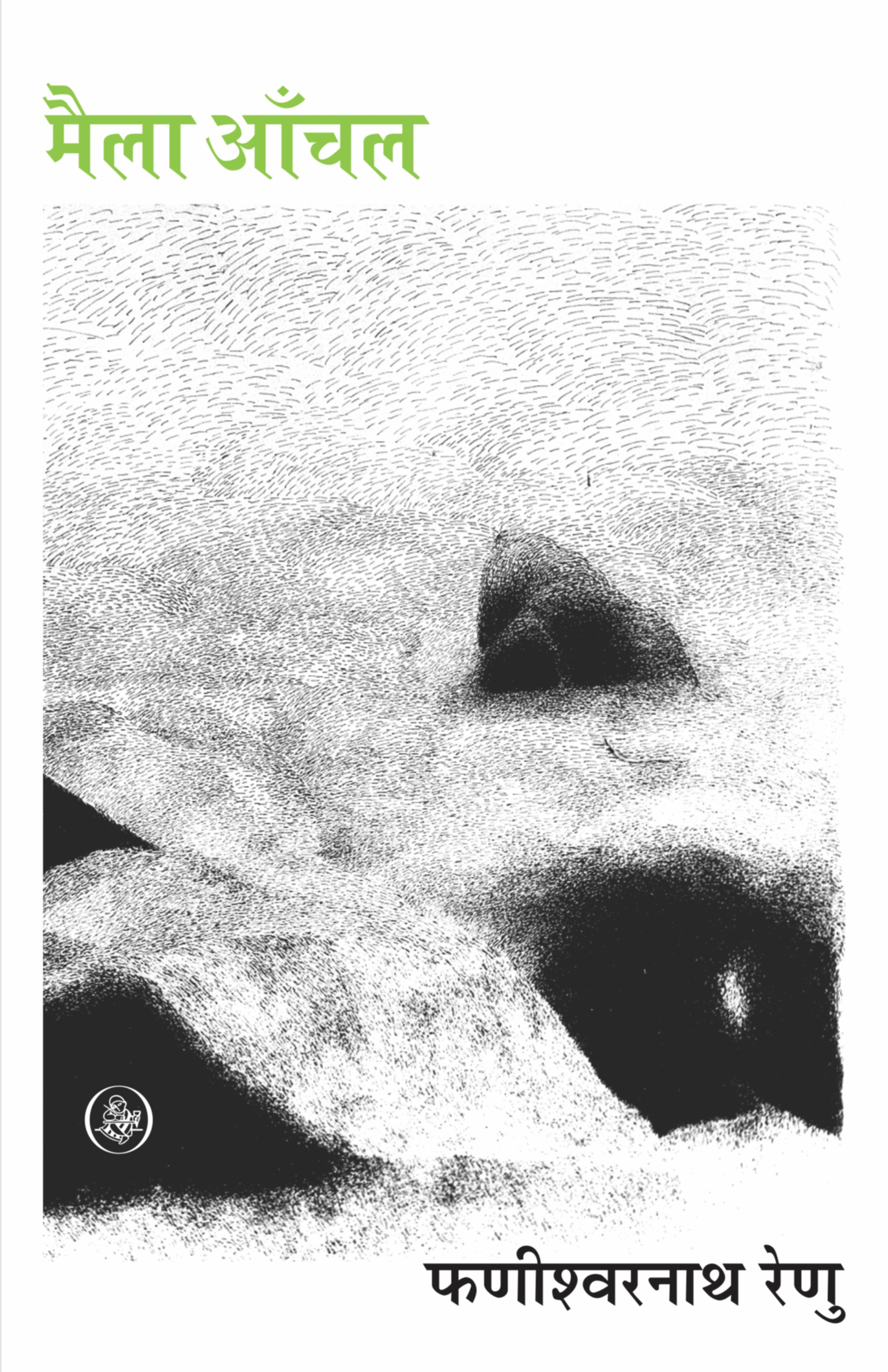
- Author: Phanishwar Nath Renu
- Original title: मैला आँचल (The Soiled Border)
- Language: Hindi
- Publication date: 1954
- Publication place: India
- OCLC: 38470854
- Dewey Decimal: 891.433
- LC Class: MLCM 91/07119

Maila Aanchal (Hindi: मैला आँचल; English: The Soiled Border) is a 1954 Hindi novel written by Phanishwar Nath Renu. After Premchand's Godan, 'Maila Anchal' is regarded as the most significant Hindi novel in the Hindi literature tradition. It is one of the greatest examples of "Anchalik Upanyas" (regional novel) in Hindi.

== Significance ==
It was the writer's first novel and immediately established him as a serious writer in Hindi literature. It radically shifted the prevalent narrative styles in Hindi novels and changed the structure of Hindi novels. It has contributed towards the study of Hindi as a language and also constitutes the major curriculum of Hindi course.

Phanishwar Nath Renu was subsequently awarded one of India's fourth highest civilian honours, the Padma Shri.

== Contents ==
This social novel details the trials and tribulations of a small group of people in a remote village of North-east Bihar during the Quit India Movement. It also has the reference of a young doctor (dagdar babu) who took care of the masses at that time, which was inspired by Dr. Alakh Niranjan, the first MBBS doctor in the locality. It is a regional novel in true sense as local colour is reflected in it by means of dialect, life style, superstitions and beliefs, festivals and culture of the rural people. The characters are fit to the region and they are guided by the regional characteristics . The region becomes to be a living character and plays a great role in leading the characters to the catastrophe .

== Adaptation ==
Maila Aanchal, a television adaptation of the novel aired on DD National, the Indian national public broadcaster, during the 1990s.
