= Dhaumya =

Character in the Mahabharata

- Mahabharata character
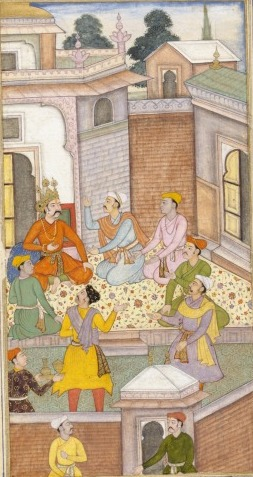
- A folio from Razmnama (16th century Persian translation of Mahabharata) depicting Dhaumya in a council, discussing with Yudhishthira regarding his Rajasuya sacrifice
- Gender: Male
- Occupation: Purohita
- Family: Devala (brother)
- Origin: Utkocha

Dhaumya (Sanskrit: धौम्य) is a supporting character in the ancient Indian epic Mahabharata, where he serves as the purohita—family priest and religious guide—of the Pandavas—the central characters of the narrative.

Dhaumya is introduced as an ascetic who is approached by the Pandavas to become their priest after their escape from the Lakshagriha (House of Lac). Renowned for his mastery of Vedic rites, wisdom, and commitment to dharma (righteous conduct), Dhaumya performs key rituals for them, including their wedding to Draupadi and Yudhishthira’s Rajasuya sacrifice. During their exile in the forest, Dhaumya accompanies the Pandavas, settling there to serve and guide them. Throughout the epic, he counsels them on dharma, cosmology, and kingship.

== Etymology ==
According to the Indologist Monier-Williams, the etymology of Dhaumya (धौम्य) is traced to the word dhūma (धूम), meaning "smoke." It is classified as a patronymic derived from dhūma, with the suffix -ya, which indicates descent or association. Thus, Dhaumya literally means "descendant of Dhūma" or "one connected with smoke".

In the Mahabharata (1.3.19–82), a sage named Ayoda Dhaumya is depicted as the guru (teacher) of Aruni, a prominent figure in Vedic tradition. The connection between Ayoda Dhaumya and Dhaumya is unclear in the epic.

== Literary background ==
The Mahabharata, one of the Sanskrit epics from the Indian subcontinent, other being the Ramayana. It mainly narrates the events and aftermath of the Kurukshetra War, a war of succession between two groups of princely cousins, the Kauravas and the Pandavas. The work is written in Classical Sanskrit and is a composite work of revisions, editing and interpolations over many centuries. The oldest parts in the surviving version of the text may date to near 400 BCE.

The Mahabharata manuscripts exist in numerous versions, wherein the specifics and details of major characters and episodes vary, often significantly. Except for the sections containing the Bhagavad Gita which is remarkably consistent between the numerous manuscripts, the rest of the epic exists in many versions. The differences between the Northern and Southern recensions are particularly significant, with the Southern manuscripts more profuse and longer. Scholars have attempted to construct a critical edition, relying mostly on a study of the "Bombay" edition, the "Poona" edition, the "Calcutta" edition and the "south Indian" editions of the manuscripts. The most accepted version is one prepared by scholars led by Vishnu Sukthankar at the Bhandarkar Oriental Research Institute, preserved at Kyoto University, Cambridge University and various Indian universities.

== Biography ==
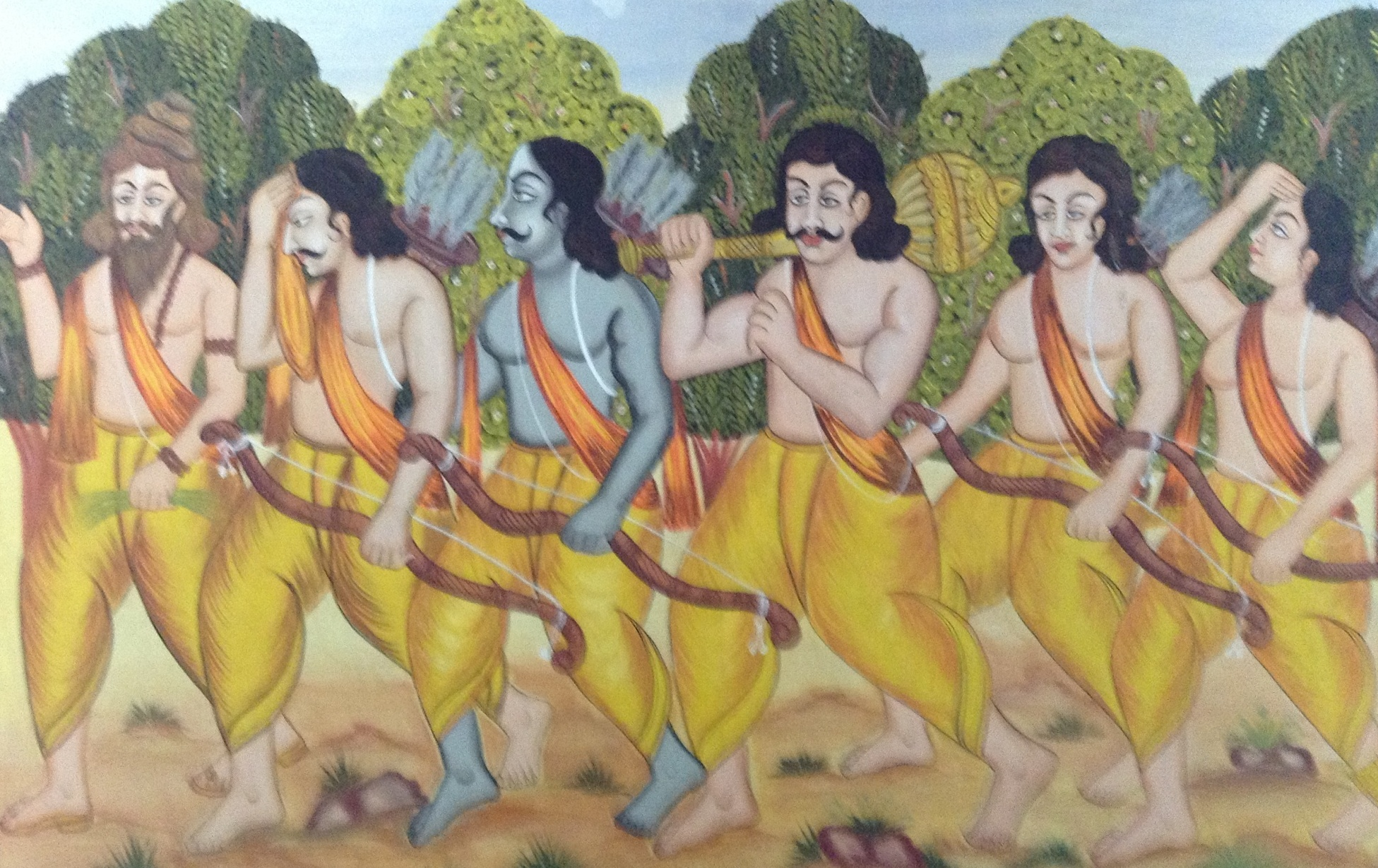
Dhaumya, with kusha grass, leading the Pandavas to the forest, a contemporary despiction

Dhaumya first entered the narrative in the Adi Parva (first book of the epic), after the Pandavas escaped from the Lakshagriha (House of Lac), a trap set by their rivals, the Kauravas. He is introduced as a ascetic hermit, with little family background except for the mention of his brother, Devala. Upon reaching the banks of the Ganges, the Pandavas encountered Dhaumya at the sacred site of Utkoca, where he was engaged in deep penance. Following Arjuna’s victory over the Gandharva Chitraratha, the latter advised the Pandavas to appoint a purohita (priest) as their spiritual guide. Acting on this advice, they approached Dhaumya, who agreed to serve as their priest.

Dhaumya’s first major contribution as the Pandavas’ priest came during their marriage to Draupadi, the princess of Panchala. After Draupadi's marriage to all the five brothers were fixed, Dhaumya officiated the marriage rites, conducting separate ceremonies to sanctify her union with each of the five Pandava brothers, as ordained by divine will. After the Pandavas established the kingdom of Indraprastha, Dhaumya became one of the council members. Later, when sons were born to the Pandavas, he performed their upanayana (sacred thread) ceremonies. Dhaumya also presided over significant royal rituals. Notably, he served as the chief priest during Yudhishthira’s Rajasuya sacrifice, a grand ceremony symbolizing imperial authority. He culminated Yudhishthira’s formal consecration as emperor.

When the Pandavas and Draupadi were exiled to the forest after losing their kingdom in a rigged dice game, Dhaumya accompanied them during this period. On their way to the forest, Dhaumya walks ahead with kusha grass in hand and chants hymns such as Yamasama and Rudrasama to protect and bless them on their journey. During the entire period of exile, Dhaumya lived with the Pandavas and helped them at numerous occasions. He advised Yudhishthira on the importance of various sacred tirthas (pilgrimage sites) and when Yudhishthira struggles to feed the accompanying Brahmins, Dhaumya advises him to worship the Sun-god Surya by reciting his 108 names. Surya blesses Yudhishthira with inexhaustible food for twelve years, thereby allowing them to sustain their companions. Dhaumya used his ascetic powers to render ineffective the magical illusions of Kirmira, a powerful demon who attacked the Pandavas in the forest. Dhaumya also explained the movements of the Sun and the Moon to Yudhishthira, describing their cosmic significance and linking them to the positions of Vishnu and Brahma in Vedic cosmology. When Jayadratha abducted Draupadi from the hut, Dhaumya reproached him and attempted to stop him. As the Pandavas prepared to live incognito during their final year of exile in the court of King Virata, Dhaumya provided them with strategic advice on maintaining their anonymity. Before they left, he also performed the Agnishtoma sacrifice and recited Vedic mantras to bless their mission and ensure their success. During this period, Dhaumya resided in Panchala.

Following the Kurukshetra War, Dhaumya conducted the funeral rites and offerings for the fallen warriors, including the Pandavas’ relatives. Later, after Yudhishthira’s coronation as Emperor, Dhaumya continued to serve Yudhishthira in the court of Hastinapura and imparted teachings on the principles of dharma (righteousness) and governance.
