= Lakshagriha =

House of lacquer in the Mahabharata

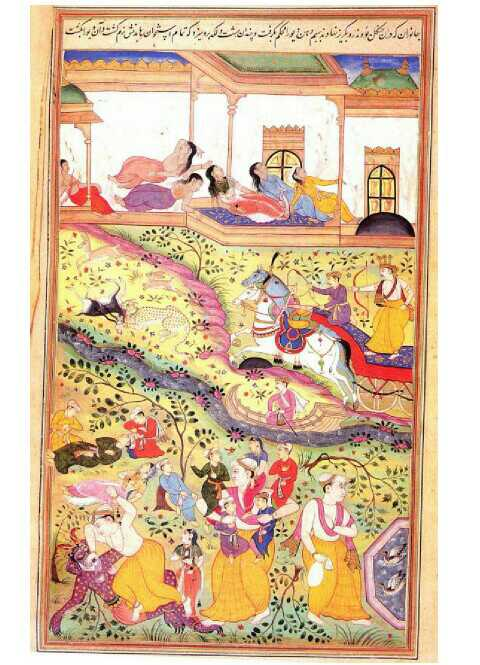
The Pandavas escape from the Lakshagriha, Razmanama

Lakshagriha (Sanskrit: लाक्षागृहम्, romanized: Lākṣāgṛham), also referred to as Jatugriha, or the House of Lacquer, is a palace made of lacquer featured in the Hindu epic Mahabharata. It is the setting of an assassination plot in the epic, devised by the prince Duryodhana to murder his cousins, the Pandavas, by planning to immolate them while they slept within the palace.

== Literature ==
=== Mahabharata ===
Dhritarashtra, the ruler of the Kuru kingdom, designated his nephew and the eldest son of Pandu, Yudhishthira, as the heir-apparent to the throne. Yudhishthira and his four brothers, called the Pandavas, grew popular among the masses, owing to their great deeds and prowess. Threatened by his cousins' fame and stoked by envy, Dhritarashtra's eldest son, Duryodhana, persuaded his father to allow him to plot against them to retain control over the kingdom.

Gaining the king's consent, Duryodhana instructed the architect Purochana to build a palace using flammable lacquer, and set it aflame on a designated day to assassinate the sleeping Pandavas and their mother Kunti. At court, Dhritarashtra encouraged the Pandavas to visit the town of Varanavata and attend its festivities. Yudhishthira suspected the ulterior motives of the king, but found himself unable to refuse his bidding. Before their departure, their uncle, the minister Vidura, cryptically warned Yudhishthira of the plot against their lives in a Mleccha language, and a means of escape. Upon their arrival to the town and the inspection of the Lakshagriha, Yudhishthira informed his mother and the brothers of the plot. He observed that the house of lacquer contained the substances of hemp, resin, straw, as well as bamboos, all of which were soaked in ghee, making it extremely flammable. Rather than choose to reside elsewhere, which could attract suspicion, Yudhishthira decided to orchestrate a deception for their survival. A skilled miner was dispatched by Vidura to assist the princes in their escape. While the Pandavas hunted, the miner excavated a wide tunnel, originating at the middle of the Lakshagriha and ending along the banks of the river Ganga.

After a year had passed, Yudhishthira organised a festival within the palace, inviting the people of the town. Purochana grew inebriated and fell asleep. After the attendees of the festivities had departed, Yudhishthira ordered his brother, Bhima, to set the Lakshagriha aflame, after which they escaped through the tunnel with Kunti. They were ferried to safety by a boatman sent by Vidura. The casualties of this fire were Purochana, and a nishada woman and her five sons, who had also fallen unconscious due to their inebriation. The burnt corpses of the nishadas were mistaken by the townsfolk of Varanavata for the Pandavas and Kunti. Following this episode, Dhritarashtra and Duryodhana arranged for the cremation of what they also took for the bodies of their relatives, and Duryodhana was groomed as the new heir to the throne.

== See also ==
- Mayasabha
- Kamyakavana
- Dvaitavana
- Khandavaprastha
- Pandav Sthan
