= Bhimana Amavasya =

Hindu observance

- Observed by: Hindus
- Type: Hindu
- Significance: Bhima's victory over Bakasura; Shiva's acceptance of Parvati as his wife
- Celebrations: Vratam, rituals, pujas
- Observances: Fasting, Pujas
- Date: New moon day (Amavasya) of Ashadha
- Frequency: Annual

Bhimana Amavasya (Sanskrit: भीमना अमावस्या, romanized: Bhīmana Amāvasyā, lit. 'New moon day of Bhima') is a Hindu occasion that is observed in the state of Karnataka It is celebrated on the new moon day (amavasya) of the Ashadha month of the Hindu calendar.

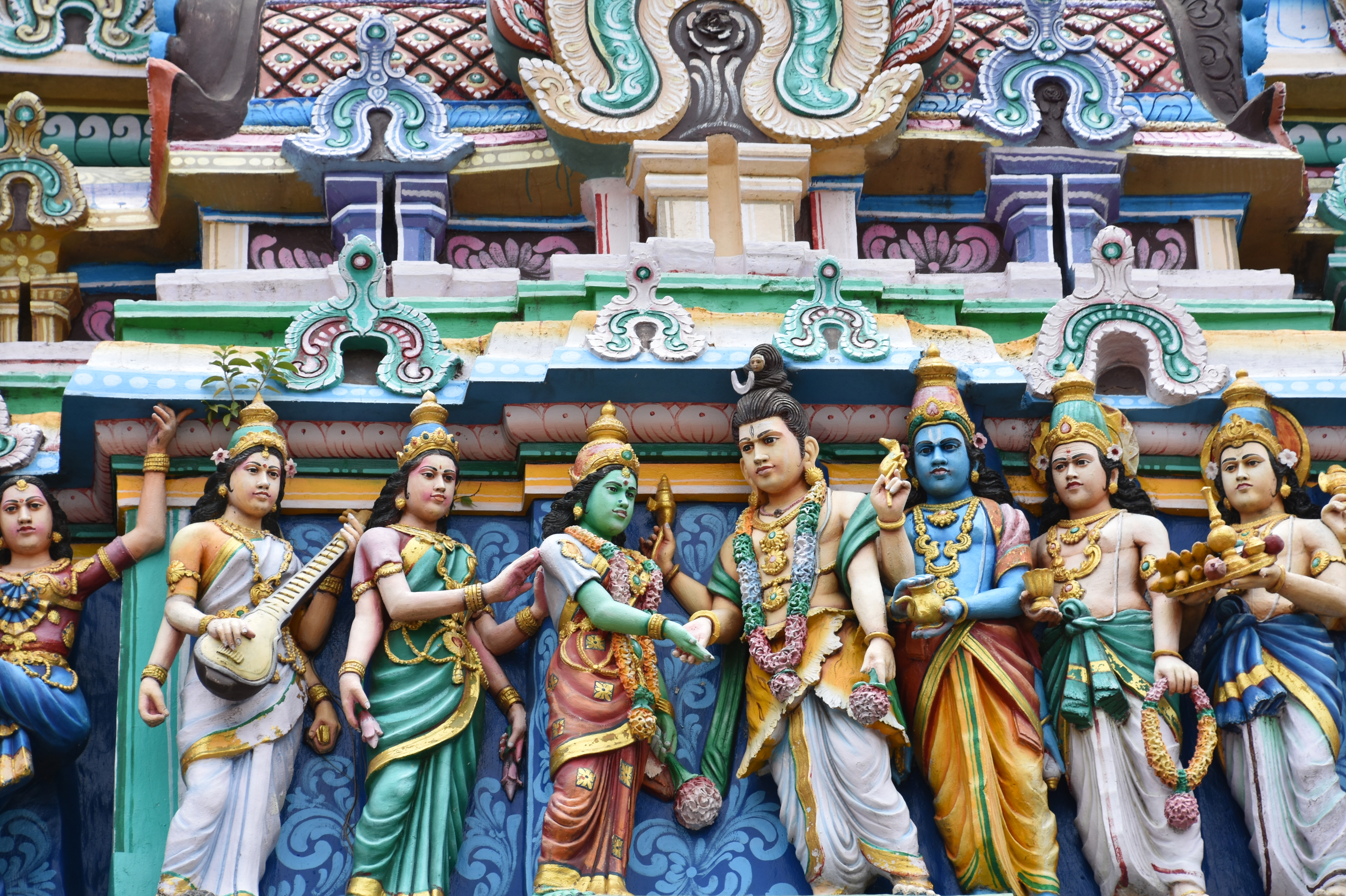
Shiva marries Parvati, Chidambaram.

== Significance ==
The amavasya, as well as the fortnight containing the new-moon, is considered auspicious by Hindus. They believe that during this period, their offerings reach their forefathers, and in return, offerors are blessed. It signifies the beginning of auspicious period, and many pujas are performed towards various Hindu deities, seeking their blessings.

The observance is primarily associated with Bhima, one of the five protagonists of the Mahabharata. The Bhimana Amavasya is regarded to be Bhima's birthday, as well as the day he slew the wicked Bakasura, thereby saving his Brahmin hosts from being eaten by the rakshasa.

In Karnataka, the last day of Ashadha is marked as the Bhimana Amavasya. The Shaivas of this region believe that on this day, Shiva, impressed by Parvati's devotion towards him, accepted her as his wife. It is believed if women perform a vrata, thereby abstaining from consuming food on this day, and offer prayers to Shiva, Parvati would bless them by seeking a virtuous husband for unmarried women, while married women receive long life, success, and happiness for their husbands. Sisters also pray for the well-being of their brothers. Murtis of Shiva and Parvati are made using red mud clay, dried and decorated with ash and vermilion. They are also sometimes made of panchaloha (five materials – gold, silver, copper, bronze, and zinc).
