= Kirmira =

Rakshasa in Hindu mythology

Kirmira (Sanskrit: किर्मीर, IAST: Kirmīra) is a Rakshasa featured in the Mahabharata. He is the younger brother of the Bakāsura and a friend of Hiḍimbā. He lived in the Kāmyaka Forest and hunted men at night for his food. He opposed the Pandavas entering the forest and threatened to eat Bhima, by whom he was slain in combat.

== Encounter with the Pandavas ==
One night during their travels, the exiled Pandavas reached the deserted forest where Kirmira lived. The hour had passed midnight, so Kirmira had come out. With his prominent teeth and blazing hair, he took on an appearance akin to thunderclouds. He started "to spread the illusion proper to his species." He obstructed the Pandavas and frightened Draupadi, who was escorted and supported by the five Pandavas. After his illusion was destroyed by the priest Dhaumya, Yudhishthira, as the eldest Pandava, spoke with Kirmira. Thus Kirmira learned that before him stood the Pandavas, including Bhima. Kirmira swore that he would have revenge against Bhima, who had slain his brother Bakasura and friend Hidimba. Arjuna strung his bow, but Yudhishthira told him to desist, allowing Bhima to fight Kirmira in a duel.

Bhima first tore up a tree and brought it down on the Kirmira's head. The Rakshasa was unmoved by the blow and hurled his firebrand at Bhima. But Bhima deflected it back towards the Rakshasa. They continued to battle, breaking innumerable trees over each others' heads. Then the Rakshasa hurled a crag at Bhima, also without result.

Kirmira and Bhima then wrestled fiercely. Bhima, seizing the Rakshasa by the waist, began to whirl him about. At last the fatigued Rakshasa grew faint. Bhima pinned Kirmira's waist under his knee and choked him to death with his hands. Kirmira was thus slain in combat by Bhima, in obedience of the command of his elder brother, Yudhishthira.
