= Pandav Sthan =

Archaeological sites in Mithila region

- पाण्डव स्थान (Maithili)
- Panr (Pāṇḍavasthāna)
- Interactive map of Pandav Sthan
- 25.6866718°N 85.8008610°E
- Type: Archaeological sites
- Cultures: Hinduism; copper age civilization; Kushan civilization
- Location: Panr, Dalsinghsarai block
- Region: Mithila region
- Part of: Mahabharata

Site notes
- Area: 22 acres (8.9 ha)

Pandav Sthan (Maithili: पांडव स्थान, Romanised: Pāṇḍavasthāna) also known as Panr is an ancient archaeological site in the Mithila region of the Indian subcontinent. It is related to the epic Mahabharata. It is located at Panr village of the Dalsingsarai block in the Samastipur district of Bihar in India. Presently there is a temple known as Pandava Krishna Dham Mandir near the site in which the statues of Krishna and the five Pandavas are installed. In historical records, Panr has been mentioned as an ancient and historical city on the Ganges plains of the Mithila region.

== Description ==
According to the director Vijay Kumar Chaudhary of the Kashi Prasad Jayaswal Research Institute in Patna, the radiocarbon dating proves that the antiquities found here are about 3600 years old. Similarly a 400-years-old civilization was also found here. It became an important trading center from time to time until the Buddha period. During the Kushan period, the entire area was developed as a city.

The Chief Minister of Bihar, Nitish Kumar, and other political leaders also inspected the excavations. They also said that this archaeological site should be given the status of a tourist spot but later the excavations were stopped and neglected. Nowadays the local residents are making the lands of the site as fertile soil for agriculture purposes.

== Excavations ==
In the year 2002, archaeological excavations were conducted in which evidence of the Kushan civilization was found there. Till the year 2020, eight archaeological excavations were conducted at the site. The excavations were conducted in the supervision of the Kashi Prasad Jayaswal Research Institute in Patna. The archaeologists were deputed to this site by the research institute to supervise the excavations. According to these excavations, the entire area is divided into three cultural phases. They are 2000 BCE Copper Age, 300 BCE black polished pottery and 100 BCE pre-Kushana period. It is spread over about 22 acres of land. In the excavations, some walls of thickness ranged from 45 cm to one meter wide as well as 15 pillers were found at the site.

An inscription in Brahmi script was found on a piece of pottery. After reading the inscriptions of the Brahmi script on the piece of the clay pottery, some information about the ruler and the governance system was obtained. Similarly some idols which are related to Nath Puja were excavated from the archeological site. According to the archaeological remains found, the site is identified as a 350 to 4000 years old copper age civilization.

The archaeologists have also excavated the antiquities of copper coins with portraits of kings, copper bowls, tools, seals, pottery, sculptures, onyx stones, beads, black lustrous pottery, ivory and Kushan coins, etc. According to the Radiocarbon dating examination conducted for these antiquities at the Birbal Sahni Institute of Palaeontology in Lucknow revealed that all these items were about 3600 years old.

== Legends ==
According to legend, it is believed that the Pandavas during their exile came here. The Pandava Sthan is associated with the legends of the Mahabharata period. It is said that when the Kuru prince Duryodhana tried to kill the Pandavas by setting fire to the Lakshagriha in the epic Mahabharata, then all the Pandavas came to this place through a tunnel and stayed here for several days. It was built as their shelter during the exile.
