= Bakasura =

Demon from the Indian epic Mahabharata

- Mahabharata character
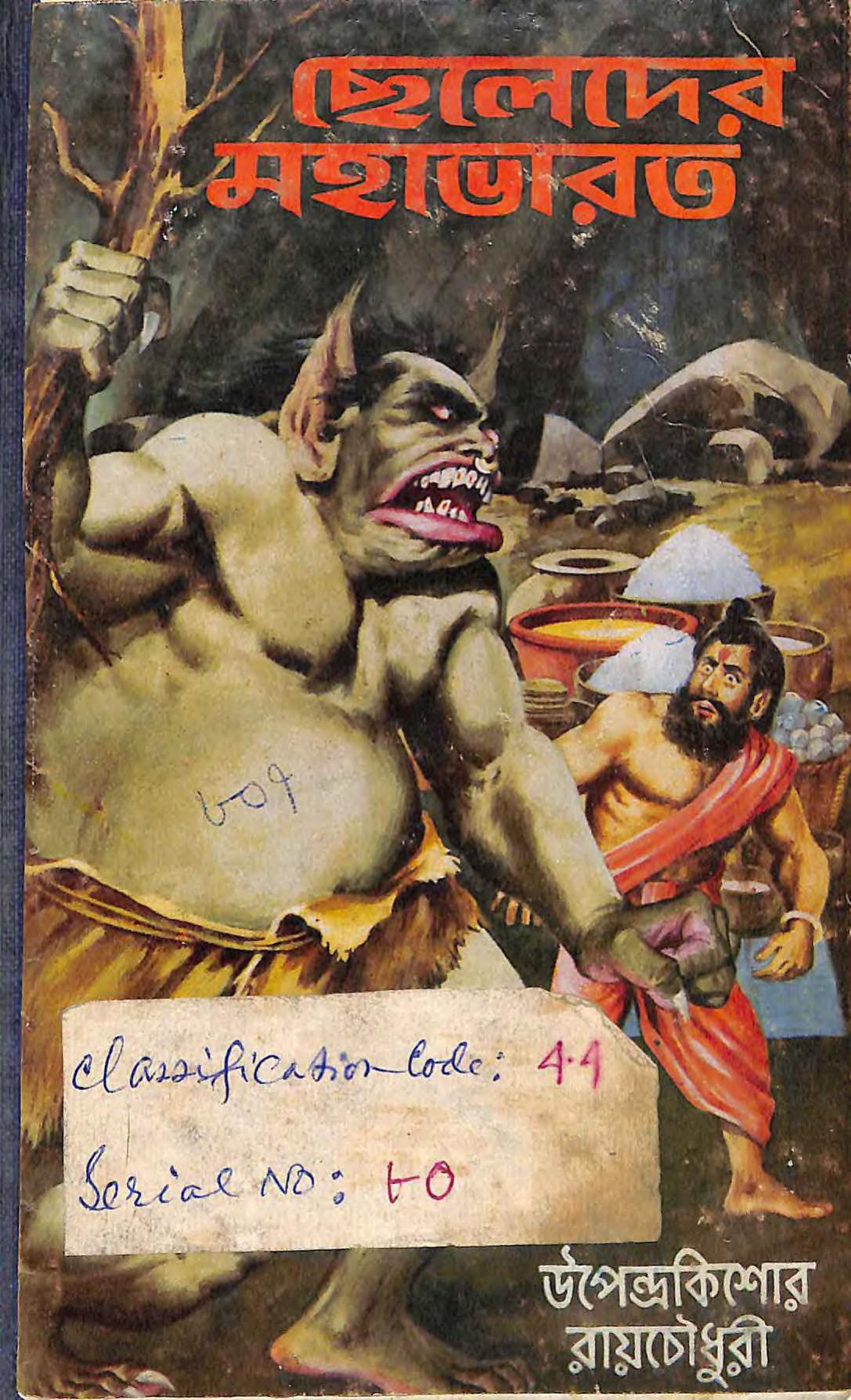
- Hungry Bakasura Meets Bhima

Information
- Race: Rakshasa
- Family: Kirmira (younger brother)
- Home: Ekachakra

Bakasura (Sanskrit: बकासुर, IAST: Bakasura), also rendered Baka, is a rakshasa featured in the Hindu epic Mahabharata. The rakshasa lives in a forest which nowadays known as "Gangani" located near Garhbeta town of the Indian state of West Bengal. In exchange for protecting the kingdom from invaders, he terrorises its citizens, eating them at will. The weak king is rendered helpless. The people come to an arrangement with their tormentor: They would send him large provisions of food every week, which he would consume, along with the cart-driver who delivered them. In order to save the life of their Brahmin host when it is his turn to deliver the cartload, Bhima is eventually sent out to kill Bakasura, under the direction of his mother, Kunti.

The slaying of Bakasura by Bhima is commemorated on the occasion of Bhimana Amavasya.

== History ==
Pandavas and Kunti travelled to Ekachakrapura after Bhima's wedding to Hidimbi, welcomed in the house of a Brahmin family. One day, Kunti heard the lamentations of the members of the family, and sought to identify the source of their distress. She overheard the husband speak of his woe that he would have to sacrifice himself in order to protect his wife and children. His wife, daughter, and son all desired to be the ones to sacrifice themselves for the sake of their family. Curious, Kunti approached them and sought some details regarding their troubles. The Brahmin informed her of the rakshasa named Bakasura, who defended the people from attackers, in exchange for a weekly delivery of a cartload of food. The person who delivered the cartload would also be devoured by the rakshasa. Disturbed, Kunti declared that no Brahmin should have to die for the depredations of the creature, and that her son, Bhima, would go in their stead. She assured the Brahmins that Bhima was of great prowess. Bhima immediately agreed to vanquish the rakshasa in gratitude for his hosts. That night, he was dispatched with the food that was to be delivered to the rakshasa, and carried the cartload to the forest, where Bakasura dwelt. The aroma of the food overpowered the Pandava so much that he started to consume it. When Bakasura saw his provisions being consumed, he was enraged, and rushed to attack Bhima. The two uprooted trees and hurled them at each other, and then proceeded to drag each other against the earth. Finally, Bakasura grew tired, and Bhima was able to plunge his knee against the former's spine, breaking his body into two. When Bakasura's friends and family arrived and grew terrified by the sight, Bhima assured them that they would be safe as long as they gave up human flesh, to which they agreed. Bhima secretly placed Bakasura's corpse upon the cartload near the town's gates and described the incident to the grateful Brahmins.
