= Kamyaka Forest =

Forest in the Mahabharata

Kamyakavana (Sanskrit: काम्यकवन, romanized: Kāmyakavana), also referred to as the Kamyaka forest, is a legendary forest featured in the Hindu epic Mahabharata. It is described to be located on the banks of the river Sarasvati. The Pandavas are described to have spent a period of their exile in this forest.

== Description ==
In the Vana Parva of the Mahabharata, the Pandavas chose the Kamyakavana as their residence during their period of exile. The forest is described to be situated upon a plain, and replete with game and birds. A number of sages are described to have been performing a penance within this forest during this same period. Vidura and Sanjaya met the Pandavas within the Kamyakavana during their exile. The princes are also stated to have met personages such as Narada and Markandeya within this forest in this book of the epic.

== Literature ==
=== Mahabharata ===
In the Mahabharata, the Pandavas are described to have journeyed three days and three nights to reach the Kamyakavana. Upon their arrival, Bhima slew Krimira, a rakshasa who barred their passage. Duryodhana dispatched a number of assassins to kill Bhima, but to no avail. A rakshasi named Hidimbi fell in love with Bhima and urged him to flee, fearing that her brother, Hidimba, would devour him. In the subsequent conflict between Hidimba and Bhima, the Pandava emerged victorious. He took Hidimbi as his wife, and sired Ghatotkacha from her. Following the birth of his son, Bhima and his brothers travelled to the region of Ekachakra.

Following a conversation with the sage Vyasa, Yudhishthira and his brothers returned to the Kamyakavana from Dvaitavana, and are described to have practised archery, recited the Vedas, and venerated the Brahmins and the pitrs. Ghatotkacha lived with them during this period. Sage Lomasha was dispatched by Indra to reassure Yudhishthira of the well-being of Arjuna, and the prince was encouraged by the deity to undertake a pilgrimage to visit a number of sacred sites.

The Pandavas returned to the Kamyakavana after the return of Arjuna, during which period they lived with Krishna and the Brahmins. During this time, Jayadratha, the king of the Sindhu Kingdom, on his way to the Salva Kingdom, passed through the Kamyakavana. He tried to abduct Draupadi, but the Pandavas were able to rescue her. During the twelfth year of their exile, the Pandavas left Kamyaka forest for the final time and returned to the Dvaitavana.

== See also ==
- Janapada
- Mahajanapada
