= Dvaita Forest =

Forest in the Mahabharata

Dvaitavana (Sanskrit: द्वैतवन, romanized: Dvaitavana), also called the Dvaita forest, is a legendary forest featured in the Mahabharata. It includes the Dvaita lake within its boundaries. The forest is described as lying south of the Kamyaka forest on the banks of the Sarasvati River, placing it on the southwestern outskirts of the Kuru kingdom.

== Etymology ==
According to the Shatapatha Brahmana, Dvaitavana is named after a ruler of the Matsya kingdom named Dhvasan Dvaitavana. This king is described to have offered fourteen horses in tribute to the deity Indra after his victory in his ashvamedha ceremony beside this lake, which was named in his honour.

== Literature ==
=== Mahabharata ===
Yudhishthira asked his brothers for suggestions regarding a forested region where they could spend their twelve years of exile. Arjuna suggested the Dvaitavana, referring to the presence of a lake within its woods as well as a population of ascetics and sages. Arriving at the forest, Yudhishthira observed that it was replete with flowers, birds, and other wildlife such as deer and elephants. Locating a settlement of holy men, he decided that they would dwell with them, along the banks of the Sarasvati. The sages Markandeya and Vaka visited the hermitage of the brothers. When Draupadi and Bhima expressed their anguish to Yudhishthira regarding his apathy to their state, he counselled caution and discussed the nature of dharma. The sage Vyasa visited the brothers in the forest and enlightened Arjuna regarding the means of gaining a number of celestial weapons to empower their side. The sage suggested that the Pandavas reside elsewhere while Arjuna was away on his quest, citing the depletion of flora and fauna in the forest. Accordingly, the Pandavas moved to the Kamyaka forest.

After their pilgrimage and the return of Arjuna from the northern Himalayas, the Pandavas lived in the Dvaitavana for the second time. During this period, the prince Duryodhana visited the Dvaitavana to taunt his cousins, under the pretence of inspecting the cattle-stations of the Kauravas in the vicinity. However, while his men were setting up camp, he was attacked by the gandharvas under the command of Chitrasena, and had to be rescued by the Pandavas.

Owing to the decline of the deer population, the Pandavas again moved to Kamyaka forest, but returned to Dvaitavana for the third and final time during their twelfth year of exile. The brothers dismissed their followers away, and are described to have found great joy, exploring the banks of the Sarasvati. Following this period, they departed for the Matsya kingdom to spend their last year of exile anonymously.
