= Nagabanda =

Rope snake in Hindu culture

Nagabanda (derived from Sanskrit which means the rope snake) is a snake that is used as an attribute in the hands of a giant statue of double weapons. This statue serves as the guardian of the temple or Hindu temple. In addition, based on the etymology of which to be rope snake, Nagabanda is also interpreted as a symbol of binder or restraint. This understanding makes Nagabanda as a symbol for people who have close ties to the community and have intimate ties with worldly materials.
