= Pratītyasamutpāda gāthā =

Phrase in Early Buddhist texts, used in devotion

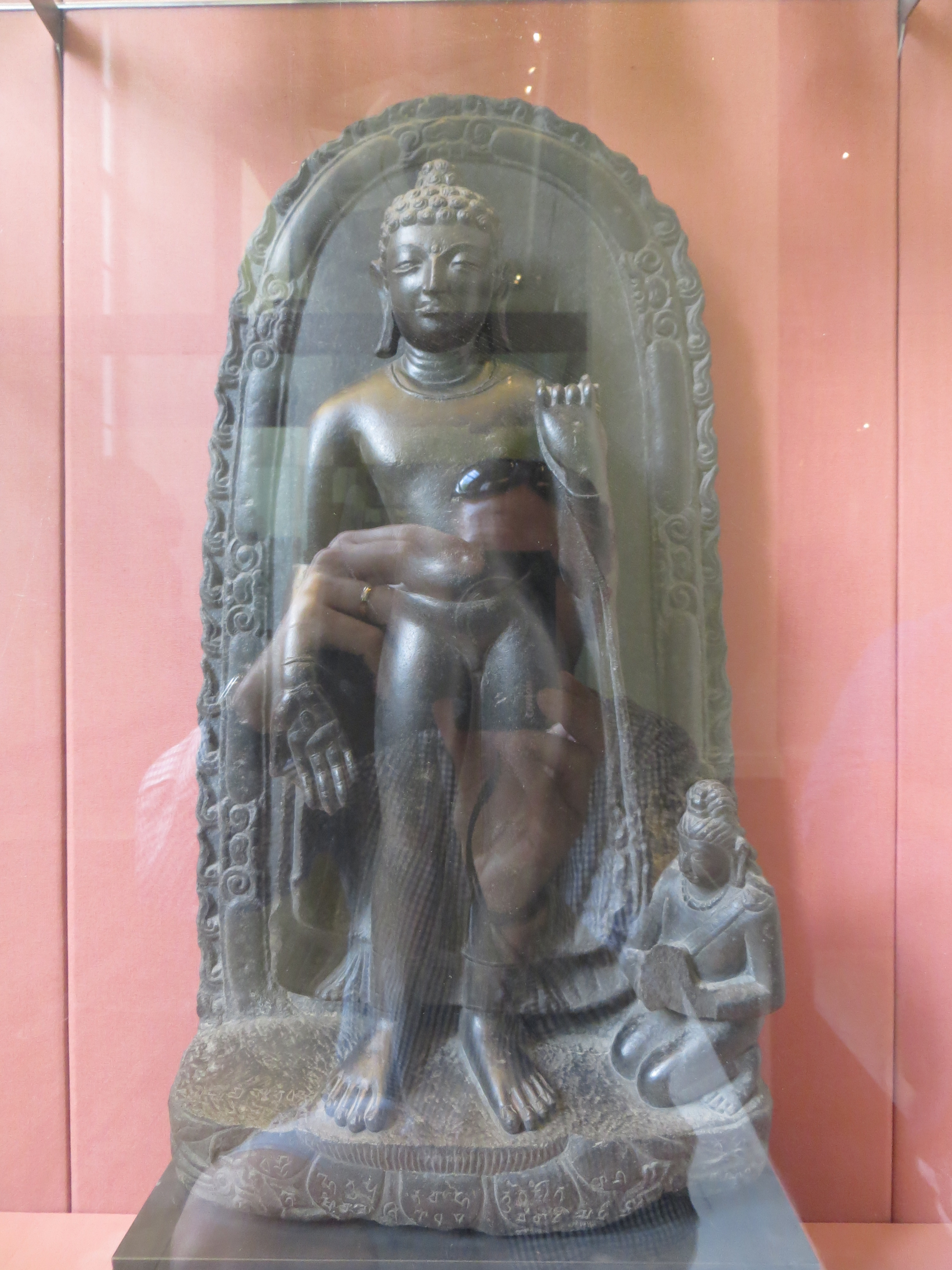
Stone statue of Buddha from Sultanganj in Bihar with ye dharma hetu inscribed on the lotus base (magnify to see), 500-700 AD

The Pratītyasamutpāda-gāthā, also referred to as the Pratītyasamutpāda-dhāraṇī (dependent origination incantation) or ye dharmā hetu, is a verse (gāthā) and a dhāraṇī widely used by Buddhists in ancient times which was held to have the function of a mantra or sacred spell. It was often found carved on chaityas, stupas, images, or placed within chaityas.

The Pratītyasamutpāda-gāthā is used in Sanskrit as well as Pali. It is found in Mahavagga section of Vinaya Pitaka of the Pali Canon. The mantra has been widely used. It has been used at Sarnath, Tirhut, Kanari Copperplate, Tagoung, Sherghatti, near Gaya, Allahabad column, Sanchi etc.

According to Buddhist scriptural sources, these words were used by the Arahat Assaji (Skt: Aśvajit) when asked about the teaching of the Buddha. On the spot, Sariputta (Skt: Śāriputra) attained the stage of stream entry and later shared the verses with his friend Moggallāna (Skt: Maudgalyayana) who also attained stream entry. They then went to the Buddha, along with 500 of their disciples, and asked to become his disciples.

== Original text ==
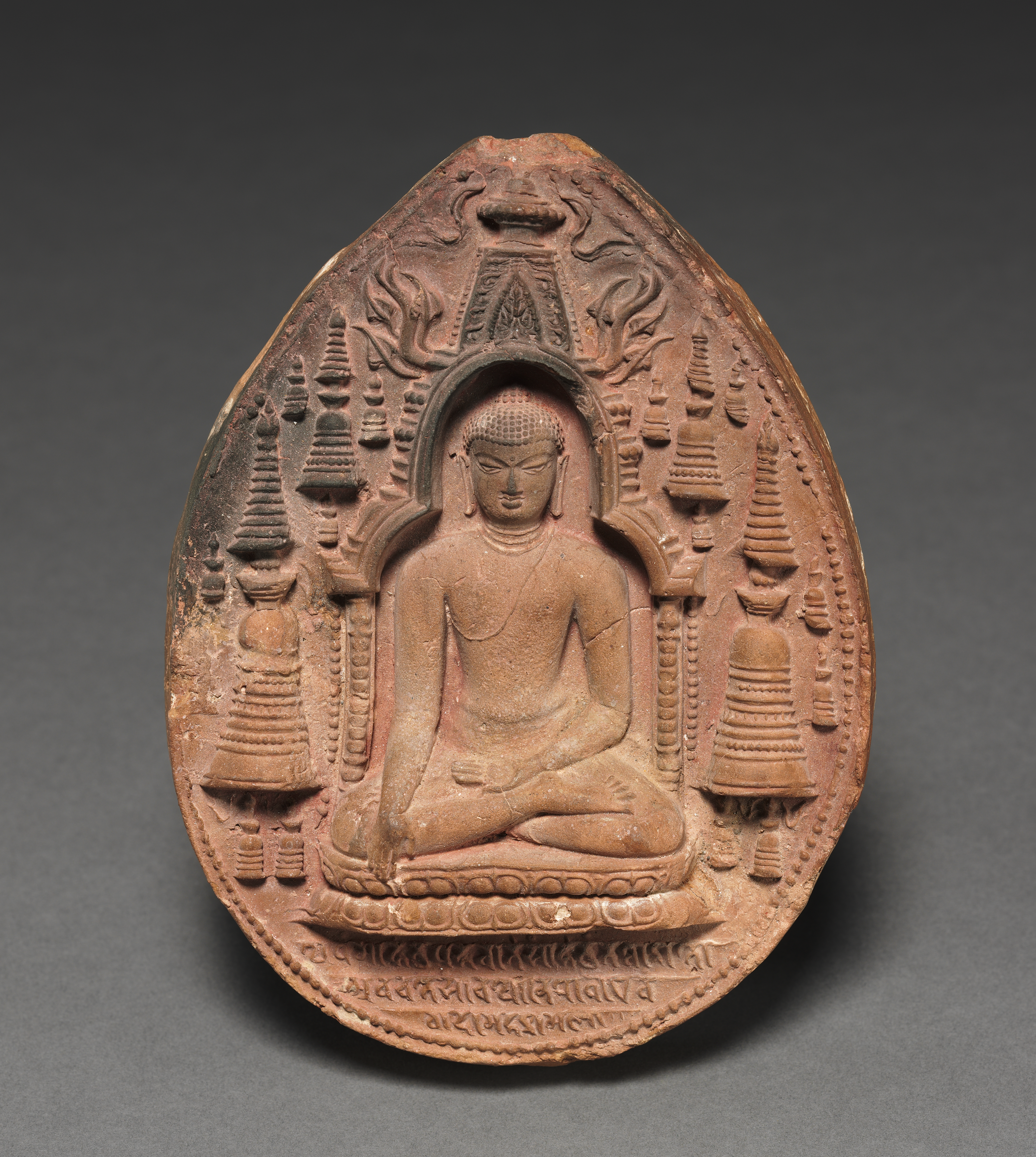
Votive plaque with figure of the Buddha at the Cleveland Museum of Art, originating from Bodhgaya, and featuring the pratītyasamutpāda gāthā at the bottom: magnify to see the text

=== Sanskrit ===
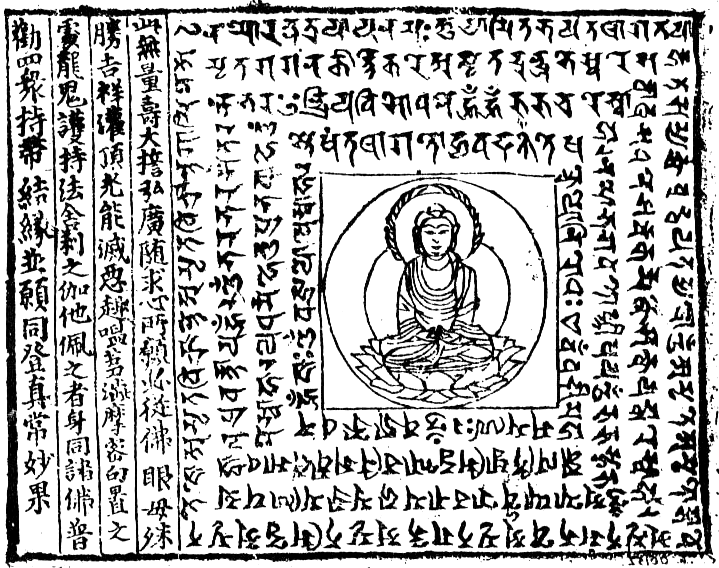
Image of a Buddhist engraving discovered by Stein at the Mogao Caves, Dunhuang, China. The engraving is a series of dharanis and mantras, beginning with the Pure Land Rebirth Dharani, but also including the Dependent Origination Gatha.

The Dependent Origination Dhāraṇī in Ranjana and Tibetan scripts

The gāthā / dhāraṇī in Sanskrit is as follows:

ये धर्मा हेतुप्रभवा हेतुं तेषां तथागतो ह्यवदत् ।
तेषां च यो निरोध एवंवादी महाश्रमणः ॥

IAST transliteration:

ye dharmā hetuprabhavā hetuṃ teṣāṃ tathāgato hyavadat
teṣāṃ ca yo nirodha evaṃvādī mahāśramaṇaḥ.

=== Pali ===
In Pali (Sinhala Script), the text reads:

‘යේ ධම්මා හේතුප්පභවා

තේසං හේතුං තථාගතෝ ආහ .
තේසඤ්ච යෝ නිරෝධෝ

ඒවං වාදී මහාසමණෝ ..”

Transliteration into Latin script:

ye dhammā hetuppabhavā tesaṃ hetuṃ tathāgato āha .
tesañca yo nirodho evaṃ vādī mahāsamaṇo ..

=== English ===
Daniel Boucher translates as follows:

Those dharmas which arise from a cause, the Tathāgata has declared their cause, and that which is the cessation of them. Thus the great renunciant (śramaṇa) has taught.

The Pāḷi commentaries take the first line as pointing to suffering (dukkha), the second to its cause (samudaya) and the third to its cessation (nirodha).

=== Tibetan ===
In Tibetan:

ཆོས་གང་རྒྱུ་བྱུང་དེ་དག་གི། །རྒྱུ་དང་དེ་འགོག་གང་ཡིན་པའང་། །དེ་བཞིན་གཤེགས་པས་བཀའ་སྩལ་ཏེ། །དགེ་སློང་ཆེན་པོས་དེ་སྐད་གསུངས།།

or

ཆོས་རྣམས་ཐམས་ཅད་རྒྱུ་ལས་བྱུང་། །དེ་རྒྱུ་དེ་བཞིན་གཤེགས་པས་གསུངས། །རྒྱུ་ལ་འགོག་པ་གང་ཡིན་པ། །དགེ་སྦྱོང་ཆེན་པོས་འདི་སྐད་གསུངས།

The Wylie transliteration is:

chos gang rgyu byung de dag gi | rgyu dang de 'gog gang yin pa'ng |

de bzhin gshegs pas bka' stsal te | dge slong chen pos de skad gsungs ||

or

chos rnams thams cad rgyu las byung | de rgyu de bzhin gshegs pas gsungs |

rgyu la 'gog pa gang yin pa |

dge sbyong chen pos 'di skad gsungs ||

== Usage ==
=== Copper plate in the Schøyen Collection ===
A copper plate from the Gandhara region (probably Bamiyan), dated to about 5th century AD has a variation of the mantra. It appears to have some mistakes, for example it uses taṭhāgata instead of tathāgata. It is now in the Schøyen Collection.

=== On Buddha images ===
The mantra was often also carved below the images of the Buddha. A Buddhist screen (parikara) and accompanying Buddha image is now preserved at Museum of Fine Arts, Boston. While the objects were found in South India, the mantra is given in north Indian 8-9th century script, perhaps originating from the Pala region.

=== Malaysia inscriptions ===
The Bukit Meriam Sanskrit inscription from Kedah includes two additional lines. The inscription is now in the Indian Museum, Calcutta. Other similar inscriptions were found in the Kedah region.

ये धर्मा हेतु-प्रभवा हेतुं तेषां तथागत उवाच
तेषां च यो निरोध एवं वादी महाश्रमणः
अज्ञानाच्चीयते कर्म जन्मनः कर्म कारणम्
ज्ञानान्नचीयते कर्म कर्माभावान्न जायते

ye dharmā hetuprabhavā hetuṃ teṣāṃ tathāgata uvāca,
teṣāṃ ca yo nirodha evaṃ vādi mahāśramaṇaḥ.
ajñānāc cīyate karma; janmanaḥ karma kāraṇam,
jñānān na cīyate karma; karmābhāvān na jāyate.

Here several minor orthographic peculiarities (i.e. misspellings) have been standardized. The lines can be translated as:

Those dharmas which arise from a cause, the Tathāgata has declared their cause, and that which is the cessation of them; thus the great renunciant has taught.

Through ignorance, karma is accumulated; karma is the cause of birth.

Through knowledge, karma is not accumulated; through absence of karma, one is not (re)born.

=== Inscriptions in Pallava scripts found in Thailand ===
Inscriptions found at Pathom stupa in the ancient Nakhon Pathom, stating the Ye Dhammā formula, written with the Grantha script.

Ye dharma hetu is also found in Thailand including the stupa peak found in 1927 from Nakhon Pathom along with a wall of Phra Pathom Chedi and a shrine in Phra Pathom chedi found in 1963, a brick found in 1963 from Chorakhesamphan township, U Thong district of Suphanburi, stone inscriptions found in 1964 and the stone inscription found in 1980 from Srithep Archeological site. All of them have been inscribed in Pallava scripts of Pali language dated 12th Buddhist century (the 7th Century in common era). Furthermore, there are Sanskrit version of ye dharma hetu inscribed in Pallava scripts in clay amulets found in 1989 from an archaeological site in Yarang district of Pattani dated to the 7th century CE.

== See also ==
- Āṭānāṭiya Sutta
- Awgatha, Burmese Buddhist Prayer
- Cetiya
- Dependent Origination
- Heart Sutra
- Jinapañjara
- Kāraṇḍavyūha Sūtra
- Maṅgala Sutta
- Mani stone
- Metta Sutta
- Nīlakaṇṭha Dhāraṇī
- Om mani padme hum
- Paritta
- Ratana Sutta
- Sacca-kiriyā, Declaration of Truth
- Shurangama Mantra
