= Smot (chanting) =

Cambodian Buddhist hymns and chants

Smot chanting, or smot (Khmer: ស្មូត or ស្មូតរ) is a chanting tradition performed primarily at funerals in Cambodia. It is associated with other various forms of Buddhist chanting used by Buddhism in Cambodia but distinct from both paritta chant and khatha used in Buddhist chant to proclaim the Dhammapada.

== Etymology: the causative form of prayer ==
Smot or smutr is a Khmer morphologic transformation of the sanskritic root sutra, which refers to a set prayer or verse, with the causative infix which induces the active verb sot (Khmer: សូត្រ), i.e. to pray, to become factitive, smot (Khmer: ស្មូត), i.e. to cause one to pray. Similarly, thlong (Khmer: ថ្លង), i.e. to be deaf, becomes tomlong (Khmer: តម្លង់), i.e. to make someone deaf.

== Aesthetics: an experience of rasa beyond religious norms ==
The content of smot reflects complex origins, where various animistic, Hindu and Buddhist traditions blend together. In contemporary Cambodia, according to Khmer scholar Khing Hoc Dy, smot falls within the category of casual literature (រឿងល្បែង), and does not belong to the canonical Khmer Buddhist literature.

Smot should be understood within the broader frame of Indian aesthetics as rasa (Sanskrit: रस), i.e. an emotion or feeling in the reader or audience that cannot be described. The main emotion induced by the performance of smot is shock or wonder, which Buddhists describe as saṃvega, an emotion similar to that which can be felt when listening to Gregorian chant according to Ceylonese Tamil metaphysician and philosopher of Indian art Ananda Coomaraswamy According to ethnologist Trent Walker, while agreeing that smot provokes saṃvega in rites for the sick and dying, a different kind of smot leads to pasāda during consecrations of images of Buddha.

The Buddhist character of this experience can be questioned, as rasa theory makes metaphysical assumptions that are inappropriate in the Buddhist context. In fact, smot applies equally to non-Buddhist songs and rituals. Various traditions of smot, such as the Chey teous and the Bat Sara Phanh, invoke the teveda, Hindu celestial figures or angles are called for help.

The texts used in smot are usually in Khmer.

== Music: the most ornamented of all Cambodian vocal performance styles ==
Smot is the slowest, longest, most complex and most ornamented of all Cambodian Buddhist vocal performance styles. It is traditionally interpreted by both men and women but is always solo and a capella, though it can sometimes be accompanied by various Khmer instruments including the tro sau.

The smot style of vocal performance is distinct from both singing and chanting, and is characterized as "sweet, melodious and musical," marked by rubato rather than strict metric time. Rich vibrato, dramatic glissandi, and subtle falsetto techniques are a hallmark.

Its length has a hypnotizing aspect as the soft, low, and slow song of the achar continues over the course of several hours until the ritual assembly joins in, gradually raising the tone and accelerating the speed of the chant which was can ultimately transform into a raucous cry.

== Classification: a plurality of functions ==
Smot serves a number of functions in Cambodia which can be classified as: lament, filial piety, Jataka tales, the life of Lord Buddha, and various Buddhist chants and blessings.

=== Lament ===
Smot is most popular as a Khmer lament, as present in other cultures such as the Arabic mawwal or even more so the Corsican lamentu which is also sung a capella and a rich ornamentation. Different from a dirge, it is not used during funeral processions but rather during static celebrations. In Khmer the two words smot and tomnounh (ទំនួញ, i.e. to lament) are often associated. One of the most popular forms of smot sang during the Khmer festival of Pchum Ben is the Tom Nounh Pret (ទំនួញប្រេត, the Lament of the Ghost) which plays heavily upon the Khmer popular belief in the evil influence of ghosts. However, in the beginning, the author exhorts listeners to go the voat temple to make offerings to their relatives who may benefit from a transfer of their merits.

=== Filial piety ===
Smot is used to express the value of filial piety, a foundational element of Theravada Buddhism, though these texts contain scant references to Buddhist teachings other than injunctions to respect one's parents. Many Dhamma hymns, like "Orphan's Lament," are dramatic stories of grief and loss that seemed unrelated to the classical Theravāda path to liberation.

=== Jataka tales ===
Smot is used for a variety of texts ranging from uniquely Southeast Asia jātaka stories from the Paññāsajātaka collection to the penultimate life of the Buddha before his awakening, the famous Vessantarajātaka as found in the Pāḷi Sutta Piṭaka.. "Sovannasam's Lament," recounting a dramatic moment in the Syama Jataka where the future Buddha laments how his death will prevent him for caring for his parents, is similar to examples in the genre of filial piety.

=== Life of Buddha ===
Smot is rarely used to relate the life of Lord Buddha. A typical example is "The Last Testament of the Buddha" in which Buddha exhorts Ānanda to continue to practice after his Final Nibbana.

=== Puja and Paritta ===
In Cambodia, some puja and paritta chants are close to smot, usually to recite gatha, typically sutta texts in Pāḷi and jaya ("victory") or blessings texts in Khmer free verse petitioning from a host of Buddhist and Brahmanical deities, following the historical syncretism of Cambodian religion. However, these texts are generally only performed by monks. Mantra songs are only recited in Pāḷi, not Khmer, so the semantic content is inaccessible for the vast majority of the laypeople in the audience.

== Performers ==
Smot can be performed by either men or women, monks or laymen but it is most often chanted solo and a capella by the achar, an elderly man well-trained in the rich religious traditions of Cambodia.

Famous chanters of smot include Prom Uth (1945–2009) or the monk Hun Horm (1924-2007) (later known as Hun Kang). Young artists who carry on the tradition are Sinat Nhok, and Pheuan Srey Peu (or Phoeun Srey Pov). Pheuan Srey Peu has studied with Prom Uth and Professor Yan Borin.

The most common scales for lament smot are hexatonic modified dorian and mixolydian scales.

== Cultural representations ==
The Cambodia Living Arts group seeks young people to study with the few remaining older masters of the art form.

Presentations of smot have been given at the Khmer Arts Academy in Long Beach, California.

In 2019, composer Him Sophy combined various traditional Khmer instruments and smot chanting with a Western chamber orchestra and chorus to create the musical track of Bangsokol: A Requiem for Cambodia.

== See also ==
- Awgatha
- Buddhist chant
- Buddhism in Cambodia
- Jinapañjara
- Paritta
- Sacca-kiriyā
- Metta Sutta
- Mangala Sutta
- Ratana Sutta

== Bibliography ==
- Walker, Trent (2018). "Saṃvega and Pasāda: Dharma Songs in Contemporary Cambodia". Journal of the International Association of Buddhist Studies. 41: 271–325.
