= Buddhābhiṣeka =

Buddhist rituals used to consecrate images of the Buddha and bodhisattvas

Buddhābhiseka (Pali: buddhābhiseka; Sanskrit: buddhābhiṣeka) refers to a broad range of Buddhist rituals used to consecrate images of the Buddha and other Buddhist figures, such as bodhisattvas.

== Terms ==
Buddhābhiseka is known by a number of different terms in various languages. The terms kaiyan (開眼; 'opening the eyes'), kaiguang (開光; 'opening the light'), and dianyan (點眼; 'dotting the eyes') and their derivative forms are used in the Chinese, Korean (where it is known as jeom-an or 점안), Japanese (where it is known as kaigen) and Vietnamese languages (where it is known as khai quang điểm nhãn), while buddhābhiseka (Burmese: ဗုဒ္ဓါဘိသေက; Khmer: ពុទ្ធាភិសេក; Thai: พุทธาภิเษก) is used in predominantly Theravada Buddhist countries.

== Theravada Buddhism ==
=== Burmese rituals ===
Burmese Buddhists perform consecration rituals for images of the Buddha used for veneration both at home and at public places of worship, such as monasteries and pagodas. Before a Buddha statue is used for veneration, it must be formally consecrated in the buddhābhiseka maṅgala ritual. The Burmese language verb for consecrating a Buddha image is anegaza tin (အနေကဇာတင်ခြင်း). This consecration ritual is led by a Buddhist monk, who recites aneka jāti saṃsāraṃ (translated as 'through the round of many births I roamed'), the 153rd verse of the Dhammapada (found in the 11th chapter), which is believed to be the first words uttered by the Buddha upon attaining Buddhahood. The consecration rite, which can last a few hours, is held in the morning and consists of four primary parts:

1. Offerings (candles, flowers, incense, flags) made to the Buddha
2. Chanting of paritta (typically Mangala Sutta, Metta Sutta, Ratana Sutta, Pubbhana Sutta)
3. Recitation of aneka jāti saṃsāraṃ
4. Recitation of the Twelve Nidānas

The consecration rituals are believed to imbue the Buddha image with a sacred quality that can protect the home and surroundings from misfortune and symbolically embody the powers of the Buddha.

== Mahayana Buddhism ==
=== Chinese rituals ===
Kaiguang (simplified Chinese: 开光; traditional Chinese: 開光; pinyin: kāiguāng) is the Chinese term for consecration of a statue of a deity. In Chinese, the literal meaning of Kaiguang is "opening of light". While it is often performed in the Chinese Buddhist and Taoist faiths, it is also well known as the ceremony of consecrating new lion costumes used for the traditional lion dance.

A Kaiguang ritual varies among Chinese religious traditions, but it is essentially the act of formal consecration for proper usage by dotting the eyes of a statue of the deity using a calligraphy brush, traditionally coated with cinnabar powder. The ritual is performed by daoshi (in Taoism), bhikkhus (in Buddhism) or by inviting a specific deity through the appointed spirit medium (folk religion). For a lion costume, a senior secular dignitary may also be invited to perform the task. The general purpose is to invite the divinity to consecrate an "empty" effigy of themselves and to fill it with divine power. The usage of a mirror (to reflect the sunlight) and a dry towel (to symbolically purify the statue from any filth) is also employed.

It is believed that if a statue or lion costume has not been consecrated, it cannot be worshiped or used for performance, as the eyes are still "closed".

== See also ==
- Abhishekam
- Awgatha
- Bai sema
- Phongyibyan
- Transfer of merit
