= Queen Anoja =

Personal life
- Born: 6th century BCE

Religious life
- Religion: Buddhism

In Buddhist mythology, Queen Anojā was the wife of King Mahākappina (also referred to as King Kappina), before he became the instructor of Monks in the Order of Buddha. She had been his wife in previous reincarnations as well and had helped him in his good works. In this age she was of equal birth with Mahākappina and became his primary consort. Some believe she was named Anoja because her complexion was the color of anoja flowers, while others say it was because in a previous incarnation she made an offering of "a garment the color of anoja flowers and a casket of anoja flowers to the Buddha, and made an Earnest Wish."

She hailed from Sagala in the Madra Kingdom (modern-day Sialkot in Punjab, Pakistan). When Kappina renounced his worldly possessions to follow Buddha, Anoja and her companions followed him in chariots, crossing rivers by an act of truth (saccakiriyā), saying "the Buddha could not have arisen only for the benefit of men, but for that of women as well."

When Anoja saw the Buddha and heard him preach, she and her companions became Stream-enterers. She was ordained by Uppalavanna (AA.i. pp. 176ff.; SA.ii., pp. 178ff). In the Visuddhimagga it is said that Mahākappina was present when she heard the Buddha preach, but the Buddha contrived to make him invisible. When she asked whether the king was there, the Buddha's reply was "Would you rather seek the king or the self?" "The self " was the answer (p. 393. The conversation on the "self" seems to have been borrowed from Vin.i.23.
