= Apaga =

Apaga may refer to:

- Apaga (river), a river mentioned in ancient Indian texts
- Apaga, Armenia
