= Maha Kapphina =

Mahākapphina (Pali) or Mahākapphiṇa (Sanskrit), also called Mahā Kapphina Thera, was an eminent Arhat from Uttarapatha and is considered foremost among those who taught the monks. Mahākapphina was his monastic name. He became disciple of the Buddha and is one of the five hundred Arhats who will be reborn and attain Buddhahood, according to Mahāyāna tradition. References to Kapphina can be found in the Jātakas, Buddhaghoṣa's Manorathapūranī, the Dhammapada Aṭṭhakathā, the Visuddhimagga, the Sāratthappakāsinī, the Saṃyutta Nikāya, the Aṅguttara Nikāya, the Vinaya Piṭaka, the Theragāthā, etc.; as well as in the Sanskrit Avadānaśatika.

== Biography ==
Kapphina was born in a city called Kukkata (Kukkutavatī according to some accounts) in a kingdom, three hundred yojanas in extent. It was a frontier kingdom, located near Himavanta or Himalaya and was ruled by his father upon whose death, he became its ruler under the name "Mahākapphina" or "Kappina," possibly being an appellation rather than a given name. His chief, Queen Anojā, was a princess from Sagala of the Madra kingdom.

Soon after ascending the throne, Kappina became attracted to Buddhism through traders from Śrāvastī, who had visited Kukkatavati and told him about the appearance of the Triple Gem in the world. Immediately upon hearing this news, King Mahākapphina, together with his thousand courtiers, and Queen Anojā with her thousand ladies-in-waiting offered splendid gifts and set out to visit the Buddha. Upon reaching the bank of a river, the troupe crossed by means of an "Act of Truth," stating:

"If this teacher be a Sammāsambuddha, let not even a hoof of these horses be wetted."

They crossed three rivers on foot: the Aravacchā, the Nilavāhana, and the Chandrabhaga. The Buddha perceived them coming with his divine eye, and after he had eaten at Śrāvastī, went through the air to the banks of the Chandrabhāgā River. He sat down under the great banyan tree facing the landing stage of the river. Mahākapphina and his men saw the Buddha and prostrated themselves before him. The Buddha taught them the Dharma and they all retired from the world, became arhats and joined the Sangha.

Mahākapphina exclaimed wherever he went:

"aho sukhaṃ!, aho sukhaṃ!!"
(Oh happiness!, Oh happiness!!).

The monks concluded that Kapphina's mind dwelt in the happiness of rulership. The Buddha informed them that Kapphina referred to the happiness of Nirvana.

== Country of origin ==
Nothing definite is known about Mahākapphiṇa. He is mentioned in the Buddhist as well as in Sanskrit literature.

In Buddhist literature, he is stated to be king of Kukkutavatī, located beyond the Indus River either in North-West Frontier Province (NWFP) of Pakistan, Northeast Afghanistan or Kashmir. Śivasvāmin, a medieval Buddhist writer and court poet of Avantivarman, writes in the Avadānaśatika that Mahākapphiṇa was the king of Lilavati, the lord of Vindhya as well as king of Daksinatya etc. Since Śivasvāmin is a very belated author (9th century AD), the scholarly community does not give much credence to his version of the Mahākapphiṇa legend compared to those provided in ancient Buddhist texts.

The internal evidence of the Mahākapphiṇa legend tends to locate Kukkutavatī somewhere near Pukkhlavati or Mashkavati in NWFP. It is notable that several similar ending names such as Utpalāvatī, Haṃsavatī, Oghavatī, Pokkharavatī (Sanskrit Pushkavati) and Pāṇinian Mashkavati (i.e. Massaga of Arrian) are documented in the NWFP.

Divyavadana attests a city called Utpalāvatī located in Uttarapatha. The ancient name of Sanskrit Pushkalavati, Pali Pokkharavati or Pushkaravati is said to have been Utpalavati and was located above the confluence of Swat and Kabul river, modern Charasadda. The story of Rupavati (Rupavatyavadana) specifically equates this Utpalavati to the Pushkalavati (modern Charasaddha, north of Peshawar). Thus, it has been conjectured that city of Kukkatavati may have been in NWFP of Pakistan or somewhere near Pushkalavati or Mashkavati (Massaga), or in north-east Afghanistan, in the land of Ashvaka Kambojas. The marriage of king Kapphina to Anoja, the princess of Madda (Madra) kingdom also points to this direction.

== Kapphina related to Kapin/Kipin/Kophene (Kabul/Kapisa or Kamboja) ==
It has been suggested that the very name Kapphina or Kappina may be related to Chinese Kipin or Kapin (Jibin) or Greek Kophene. Kipin of Chinese is the same as Kophene of the Greek writings and the Kubha and/or Kapisa of the Sanskrit literature. Pāṇini teaches that the name of the Kamboja king could be same as the name of his kingdom. It therefore looks quite probable that name Kapphina was not a proper name but an appellation of its ruler and likewise may be related to name Kipin, Kapin and Kophene which are the Chinese and the Greek versions of the Sanskrit Kubha (Kabul) and Kapisa respectively. Equivalence of Kabul and Kapisa with Kamboja has also been accepted by scholar community.

Alexander Cunningham writes: "Kipin is one of the most famous but also most puzzling terms of the Chinese geography of north-western India (now Pakistan). As a geographical term the word 'Kipin' is not to be found in Indian literature. We come acrorss King Maha Kapphina or Maha Kaphina, the hero of the many Buddhist legends. He is described as ruling in Kukutavati, a frontier region and this region is definitely localized in the extreme north-west of India (now Pakistan). According to Buddhist traditions, Kaphina was a Brahman. He met the Buddha during the latter's journey to the north-west. Kukatagiri, as mentioned by Pāṇini (V. 4. 147) seems to represent some low peaks of Hindukush in Afghanistan. Thus, Kipin or Kukutawati was situated in Afghanistan near the borders of Pakistan. It is probably Huphina of Hiuen Tsang or Huppian which is Kophen (=the kingdom of Kabul). King Kapphina of the Buddhist legends was the king of this region".

King Maha Kapphina was, in all probability a powerful ruler whose kingdom besides Kabul (Kophene), probably also included parts of Gandhara. Kipin described in the Hou Han-shu may represent the region NWFP (now in Pakistan) dominated in turn by the Greeks, the Sakas, the Parthians and the Kushanas.

Maha Kapphina is said to have met Buddha after crossing three northern rivers i.e. river Aravacchā (probably Swat?), the Nīlavāhana and the Chandrabhaga. This shows that he must have come from north/north-west as river Chandrabhaga is identified with river Chenab and Nīlavāhana with river Indus (Nilab).

According to scholars like D. D. Kosambi, Kapphina was of a Kshatriya varna but according to Alexander Cunningham, Kapphina was of a Brahman varna. But these conflicting views are least problematic here since Kambojas in ancient times were given to both Kshatrya as well as Brahmanical pursuits. Pali texts' legend of Maha Kapphina however, does not specify anywhere that Kapphina was a Brahmin or a Kshatriya. But internal evidence of Kapphina legend points to his belonging to the Kshatriya varna.

Maha Kapphina is described by Buddha as pale (or white) (? odata), thin and having a characteristic thin and prominent nose (tanukam tunganasikam). Thus, the personal features, especially the Aryan nose also resemble that of a man from the North/north-west and therefore the Kambojas/Gandharas.

== Pukkusati of Gandhara vs Maha Kapphina of Kukkutavati ==
Anguttara Nikaya mentions sixteen great countries that flourished during Buddha's time of which only two i.e. the ‘Gandhara–Kashmira’ and the ‘Kamboja’ were located in Uttarapatha. Culla-Niddesa adds the Kalinga to the sixteen and substitutes Yona for the Gandhāra thus showing that when Chulla-Niddesa was composed, Kamboja Mahajanapada in the Uttarapatha was more important than even the Gandhara and further indicates that Gandhara may have formed part of the Kamboja Mahajanapada at this time. In Buddha's time, Gandhāra and Kasmira formed one country since the two countries are always mentioned together in one expression as "Kasmīra-Gandhāra" in the Pali texts. According to Gandhara Jataka, Kasmira was included in Gandhara. In Buddha's time, Pukkusāti, contemporary of the Buddha was the king of Gandhara i.e. 'Gandhara-Kasmira' . As he learnt about the appearance of Buddha, his Dharama and Sangha from his friend king Bimbisara, Pukkusati immediately decided to become a Buddha follower, ordained himself as a monk, renounced his kingdom and traveled all the way to Sāvatthi to see the Buddha. Pali texts refer to Maha Kapphina as a great king of the frontier kingdom of Kukkutavati, 300 Yojana in extent, (in Uttarapatha) and also make him contemporary of the Buddha and Pukkusati. Immediately on hearing of the appearance of Buddha and his Law and Sangha, king Maha Kapphina of Kukkatavati renounced the throne, set forth towards Savatthi to see the Buddha, and like king Pukkusati, he too became a Buddha follower and a monk. The above Buddhist evidence makes it quite clear that Pukkusati and Maha Kapphina were contemporary rulers, both belonged to the Uttarapatha, both abnegated the throne and both had become monks and Buddha followers soon after the appearance of Buddha's Law and Sangha. Since according to Pali textual evidence, Pukkusati was king of ‘Gandhara-Kasmira’, hence his contemporary king Maha Kapphina, said to be a great ruler of a frontier country (hence also from Uttarapatha), could not have been a king either of Gandhara or of Kasmira, as D. D. Kosambi speculates. This clearly means that Maha Kapphina could only have been a king of Kamboja alone (the only other Mahajanapada or great country located in the Uttarapatha division). And being immediate neighbor to Gandhara, king Maha Kapphina had followed king Pukkusati or vice versa and embraced the Buddhist faith.

== Conclusion ==
General Alexander Cunningham has identified Kukkatavati kingdom of Maha Kapphina with Chinese Kipin (=Pāṇinian Kapisa) or Greek Kophene and the Kukatagiri with some low peak of Hindukush region, which obviously refers to the land of ancient Kambojas. D . D. Kosambi has located Kukkatavati of king Maha Kapphina near Kamboja (or Kashmir). Scholars like Gauri Shankar and Michael Hahn as well as the authors of Proceedings and Transactions of the All-India Oriental Conference and of Indian Linguistics also connect Kipin of the Chinese records with Buddhist name Kapphina but identify Kipin with Kashmir. But it is generally accepted among the scholar community that the Chinese name Kipin is applied to Kapisa country which was a part of ancient Kamboja (See: Kapisa Province). Hence Kapphina and Kapin/Kipin must be related not to Kashmir but to the Kapisa (Kafiristan/Kohistan) and to Kophene (Kabul) and therefore, to the Kamboja. Since Ashvakas of Mashkavati (Massaga) and Kunar valleys were merely a specialized branch (i.e. Ashva-Yuddha-Kushalah) of the more general ethnic term Kamboja, hence D. D.Kosambi's views also reinforce the conclusion that Maha Kaphina was probably a ruler of the Ashvaka country of the Kambojas which around the time of Buddha was only a provincial district of the bigger Kamboja Mahajanapada. It is also not very insignificant to note that there still exists among the modern Kamboj a clan name known as Kukkar (< Kukkad/Kukkat) who claim to have come to Punjab from north-west across the Indus.

In the Galle District of the Southern Province of Sri Lanka, in a town called Balapitiya, there is feudal manor called the Maha Kappina Wallawa. The lineage of the family who built this manor trace back to the mountainous peaks of the northern regions of India where they were noble Brahmins. They named their ancestral and feudal home as such to pay homage to their great ancestor, King Maha Kapinna. The family has long vacated the manor which has now been rebuilt as a Buddhist temple.
