= Pūjā (Buddhism) =

Buddhist religious practice

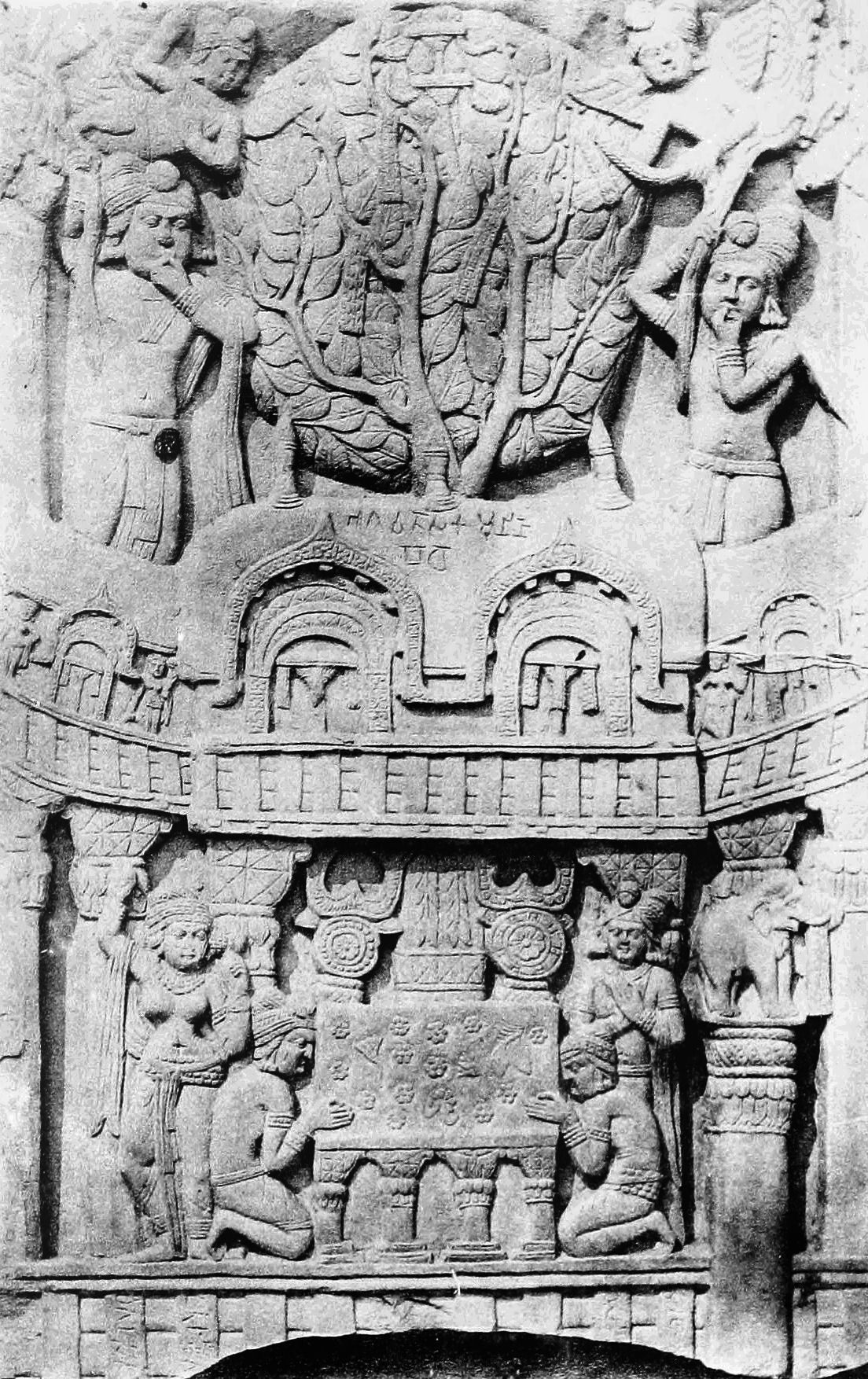
Bharhut relief of worshipers at the Vajrasana, the site of Buddha's enlightenment (2nd century BCE).

In Buddhism, a Pūjā (offering or worship) is a ritual devotional action made to a Buddha, deity or to the Triple Gem. Within the traditional Buddhist framework of karma and rebirth, Pūjās lead to the accumulation of merit (Sanskrit: puṇya; Pali: puñña), which leads to: a better rebirth as well as progress towards nirvana. The practice is also held to generate other positive qualities in a Buddhist practitioner, like respect, gratitude, and inspiration. It is also seen as being able to stimulate the blessings (adhiṣṭhāna) and power (bala) of the Buddhas. A pūjā can also act as preparation for meditation.

Common elements of a Buddhist Pūjā include the recitation of certain formulas, prayers, and texts (such as parittas, sutras or dharanis) which are often accompanied by different physical acts like bowing, prostration and the hand gesture of the añjali mudrā. It often includes material offerings such as a lit candle or oil lamp, incense, flowers, food, fruit, water or drinks. These offerings are commonly placed in front of a Buddhist altar.

== Theravada ==
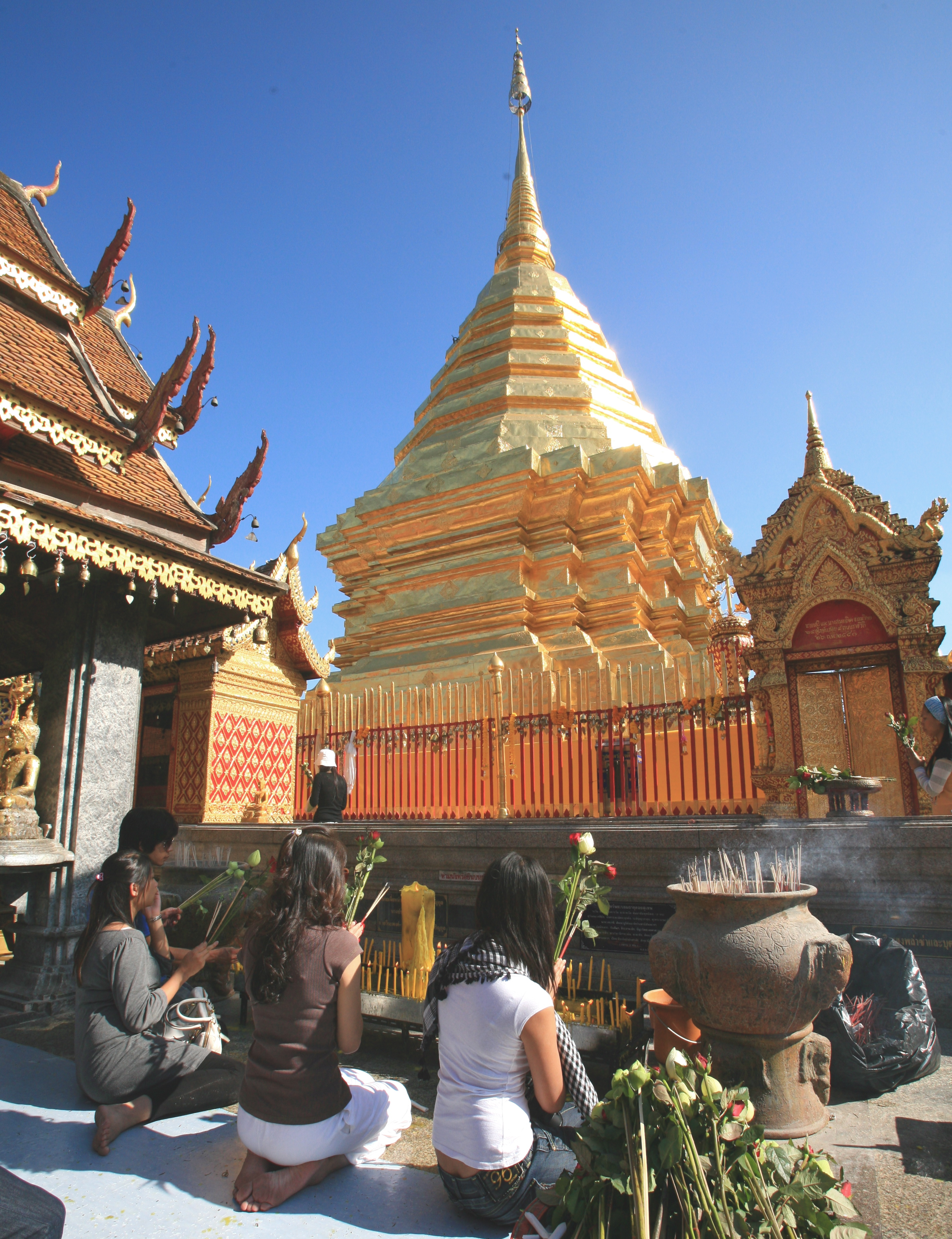
Worshippers making offerings of incense, flowers and candles to a chedi at Wat Doi Suthep, Chiang Mai, Thailand

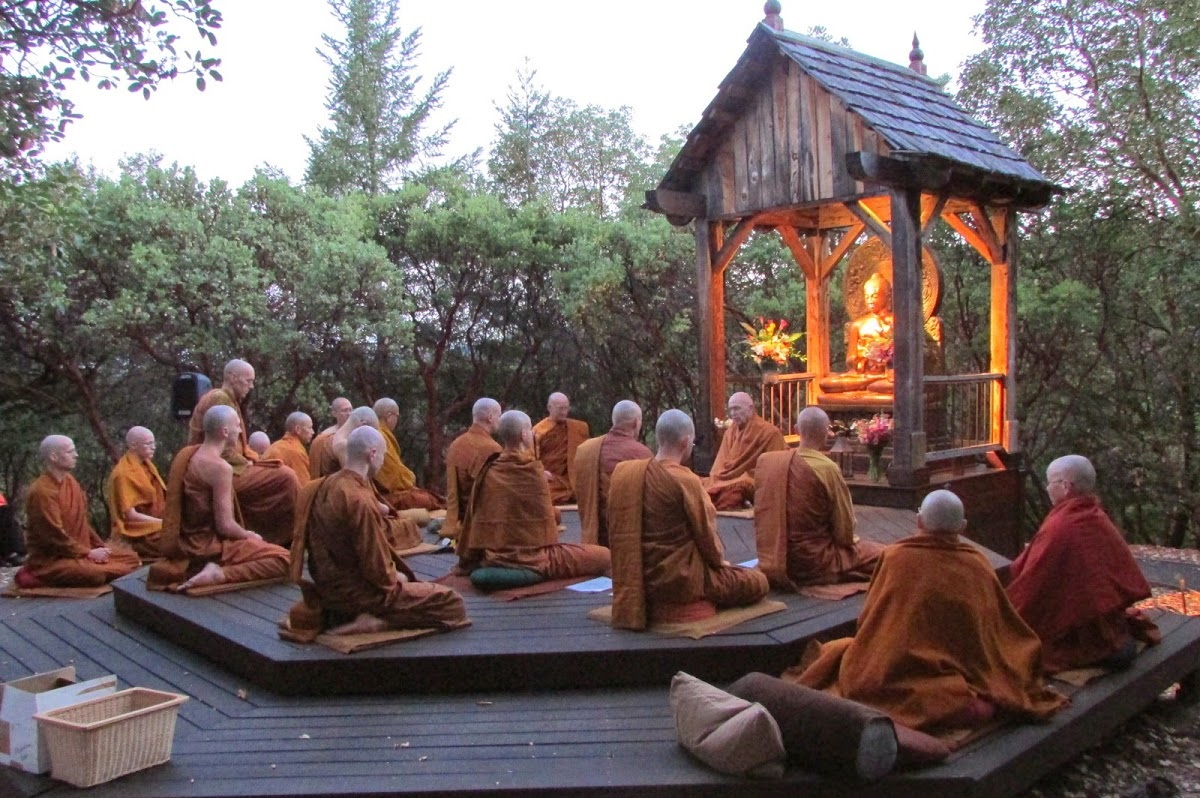
Asalha Puja at Abhayagiri Monastery, 2014

In some Theravada traditions, two different types of offerings are identified: material or hospitality offerings (Pali: amisa-puja or sakkara-puja) and practice offerings (Pali: patipatti-puja).

=== Material offering ===
Material offerings are considered external offerings of "words and deeds." Material offerings nurture generosity (Pali: dāna) and virtue (Pali: sīla). The act further honors the Triple Gem (the Buddha, Dhamma and Sangha), deepening one's commitment to the Buddha's path.

Material offerings might be imbued with the following symbology:

- the lighting of a candle or an oil lamp represents the light of wisdom illuminating the darkness of ignorance.
- the burning of incense represents the fragrant scent of morality.
- flowers represents the aspiration to achieve the body of the Buddha with the thirty-two marks of the Buddha as well as the teaching of impermanence. Alternately, a Zen verse expresses the desire for the mind's "flowers" to "bloom in the springtime of enlightenment."
- food, fruit, water, drinks represents the nectar of Dharma and the wish to achieve it.

Traditional chants in Pali, when offering lit candles (padīpa pūjā) and incense (sugandha pūjā) to an image of the Buddha are:

Ghanasārappadittena

Dīpena tama-dhaṃsinā
Tiloka-dīpaṃ sambuddhaṃ
Pūjayāmi tamo-nudaṃ

Ghandha-sambhāra-yuttena
Dhūpenāhaṃ sugandhinā
Pūjaye pūjaneyyaṃ taṃ
Pūjābhajanamuttamaṃ

With lights brightly shining
Abolishing this gloom
I adore the Enlightened One,
The Light of the three worlds.

With perfumed incense
And fragrant smoke
I worship the Exalted One,
Who is great and worthy of worship.

Similarly, a traditional Pali incense-lighting verse speaks of the Buddha's "fragrant body and fragrant face, fragrant with infinite virtues."

By contemplating on an offering, one tangibly sees life's impermanence (Pali: anicca), one of the three characteristics of all things upon which the Buddha encouraged his disciplines to recollect. For instance, the end of a traditional chant in Pali, when offering flowers (puppha pūjā) to an image of the Buddha is:

Pujemi Buddham kusumenanena

Puññenametena ca hotu mokkham
Puppham milāyāti yathā idam me
Kāyo tathā yāti vināsa-bhavam

I worship the Buddha with these flowers;
May this virtue be helpful for my emancipation;
Just as these flowers fade,
Our body will undergo decay.

=== Non-material offerings ===
Practice offerings may be manifested by practicing:

- giving (Pali: dāna)
- moral conduct (sīla)
- meditation (samādhi)
- wisdom (paññā)

In the Pali Canon, the Buddha declared practice offerings (Patipatti) as "the best way of honoring the Buddha" and as the "supreme" offering. This is primarily an internal offering for mental development (Pali: citta, bhāvanā and samādhi).

"But Ananda, whatever bhikkhu or bhikkhuni, layman or laywoman, abides by the Dhamma, lives uprightly in the Dhamma, walks in the way of the Dhamma, it is by such a one that the Tathagata is respected, venerated, esteemed, worshipped, and honored in the highest degree." (Taken from Mahāparinibbāna Sutta, Dīgha Nikāya)

== Mahayana Buddhism ==
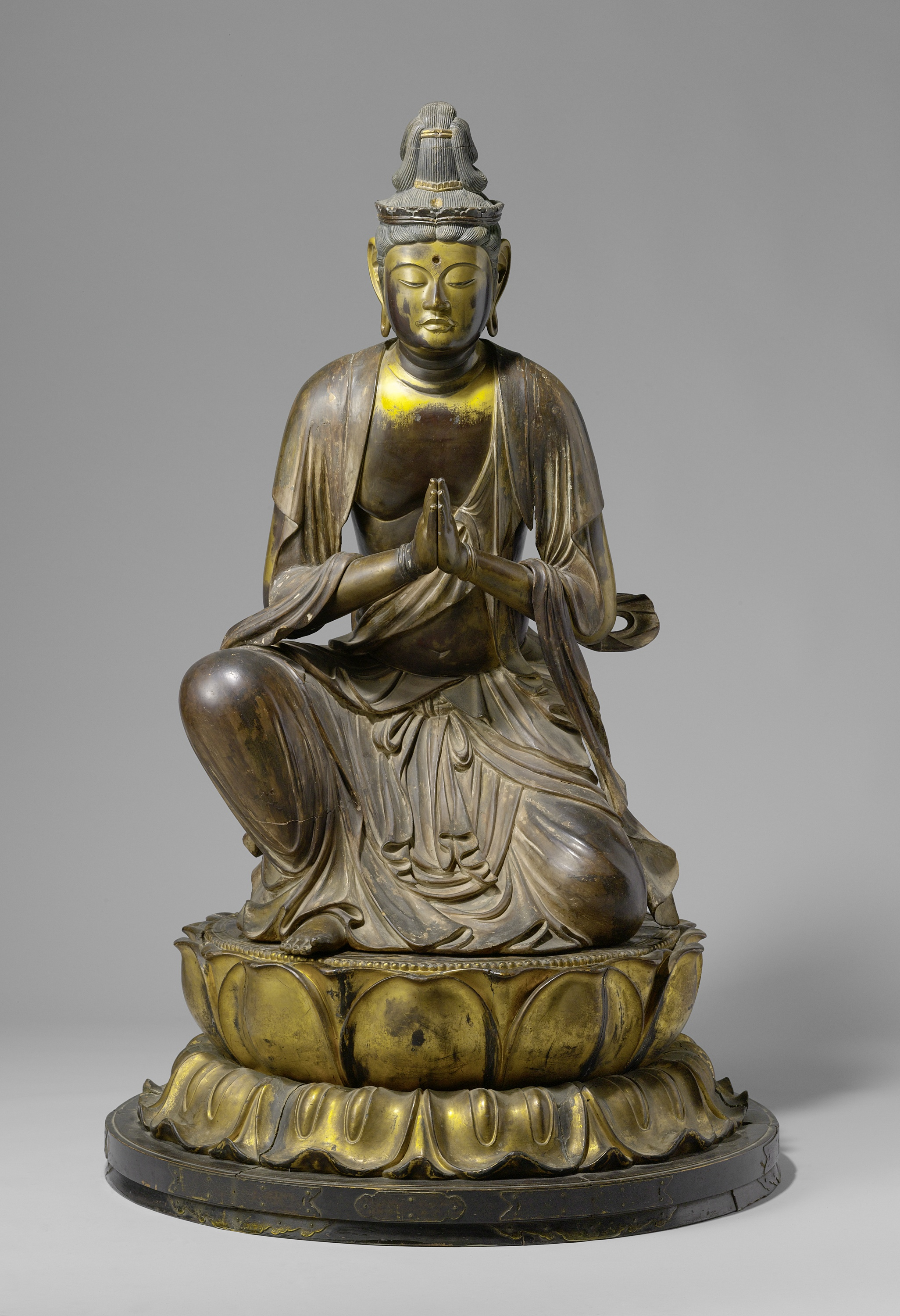
A Japanese statue of the Bodhisattva Mahasthamaprapta, doing Añjali Mudrā.

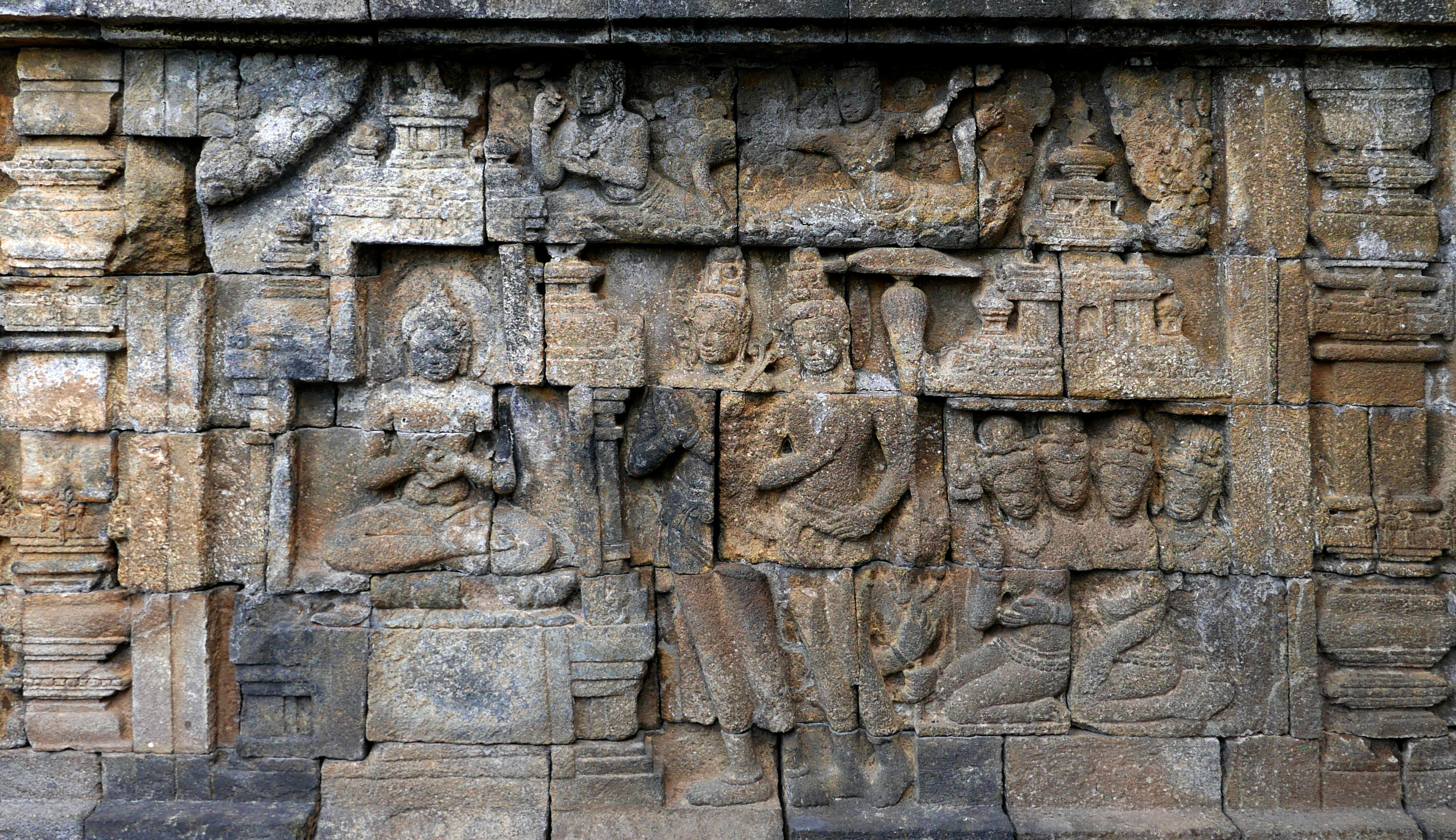
Samantabhadra and Sudhana worship a Buddha, Borobudur

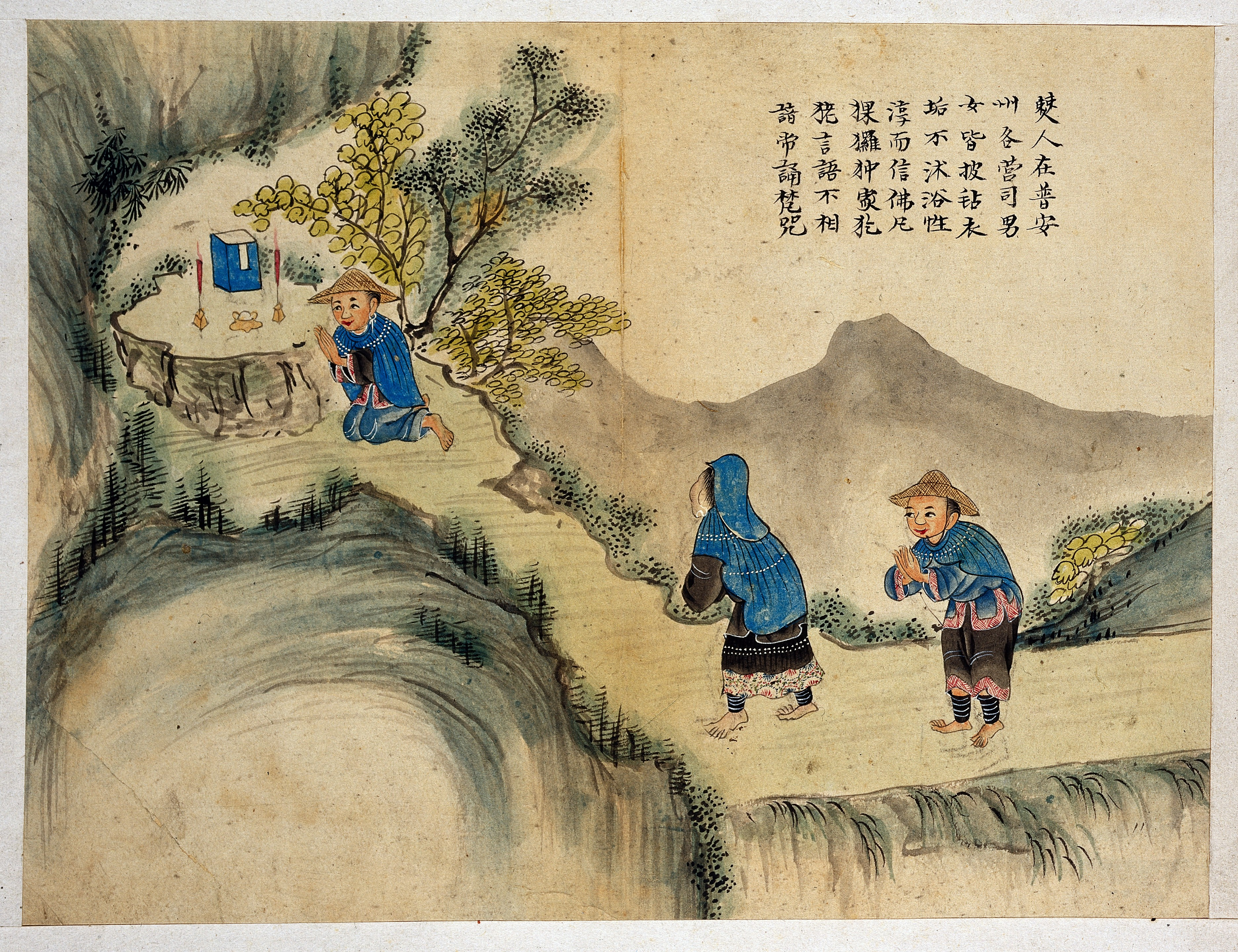
Chinese illustration of Buddhist worship in a rural shrine

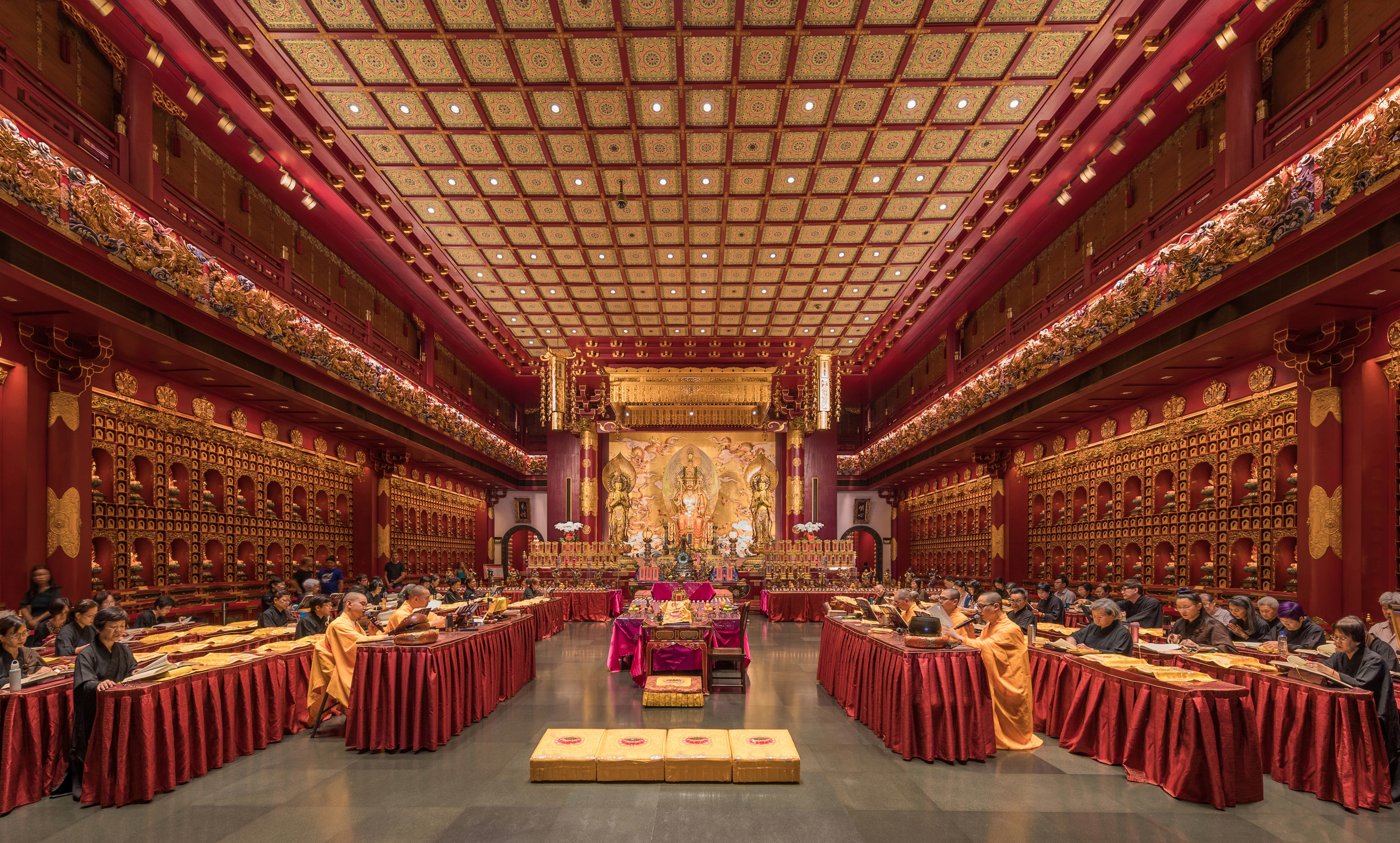
Buddhist monastics and laypeople during a service in the Buddha Tooth Relic Temple, Singapore

In Mahayana Buddhism, a puja (Chinese: 供養; Tibetan: cho, Wylie: mchod) often involves ritual offerings, prayers, and the chanting of Mahayana sutras, dharanis and mantras. It is an important practice in Mahayana tradition, where it serves to cultivate a sense of refuge and devotion to the Buddha, bodhisattvas, and other revered figures as well as to cultivate other spiritual qualities. Puja can be performed individually or in a group and is typically conducted in temples or monasteries, although it can also be done in home altars.

=== Indian Buddhism ===
Mahāyāna pujas often follow standard liturgical forms, such as the triskandhaka (three-part) and saptānga-vidhi (seven-part) rituals. These are classic Indic Mahayana pūjā forms. They initially derived from a basic three-part liturgy which consists of:

1. Confession of transgressions (pāpadeśanā),
2. Admiration of others’ virtues (anumodana),
3. Dedication of merit (parināmanā).

The second version of the three-part ritual is similar but adds a request to the buddhas to turn the wheel of the dharma (dharmacakrapravartana) instead of merit dedication.

The ritual expanded over time to include more elements. In one sūtra translated into Chinese in 2nd century named the Dispelling the Regrets of Ajātaśatru Sūtra, a five-part puja is outlined which consists of:

1. Refuge in the triple gem,
2. Confession of transgressions,
3. Rejoicing in the virtues of others,
4. Requesting the buddhas to teach,
5. Giving rise to bodhicitta

Over time, this grew into a more elaborate seven-part liturgy (saptāṅgavidhi, saptāṇgapūjā or saptavidhā anuttarapūjā), which includes:

1. Obeisance or praise (Sanskrit: vandanā)
2. Offerings or worship (pūjana)
3. Confession of bad deeds (pāpadeśanā)
4. Rejoicing (anumodana)
5. Request for the buddhas and bodhisattvas to teach the dharma (saṃcodana or dharmacakrapravartanacodana)
6. Entreaty for the buddhas not to enter parinirvāṇa (prārthanā or aparinirvṛtādhyeṣaṇa)
7. Dedication of the merit from the ritual to the enlightenment of all sentient beings (pariṇāmanā)

This seven-part liturgy, notably found in the Bhadacaryāpranidhāna ("Vow of Samantabhadra's Deeds"), a part of the Gandavyūha section of the Avataṃsakasūtra, became a central element in many Mahāyāna practices. In Tibetan Buddhism, the seven part puja is a common structure adopted in many rituals and prayers. It is frequently recited before meditation sessions and is also a key feature in tantric pūjās.

The specific actions in a Mahāyāna puja vary considerably depending on the tradition, but it generally includes offerings such as water, flowers, incense, fragrant food, and light (candles, butterlamps, etc.). These are taken to symbolize respect and reverence for the Buddhas and bodhisattvas. Pujas may also involve the chanting or recitation of specific ritual texts or sadhanas, and the names or mantras of Mahayana Buddhas and bodhisattvas, such as Avalokiteshvara, Amitabha, and Manjushri. All these actions are believed to invoke blessings, purify the mind, and cultivate merit. Pujas may also include other practices like prostrations. The Mahayana view of a puja reflects the ideal of the bodhisattva, as such it is often accompanied by prayers for compassion, for bodhicitta, the attitude to attain Buddhahood for the sake of all beings, and the bodhisattva vows.

=== East Asian Buddhism ===
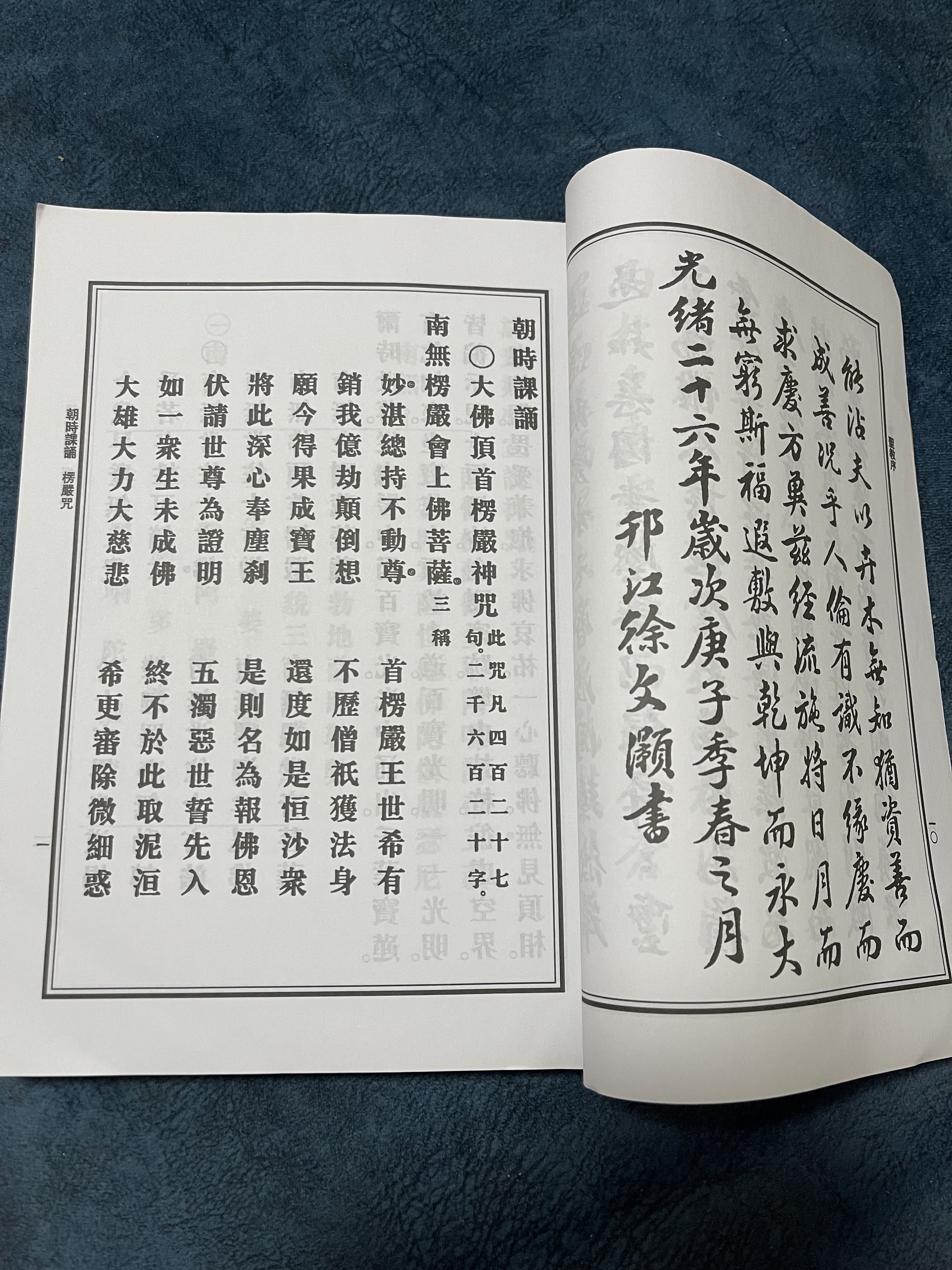
First page of a modern edition of the Chanmen Risong 禪門日誦, a compilation of liturgical texts for Chinese Buddhist liturgical service, showing the Shurangama mantra as the first mantra during morning liturgical services

East Asian Buddhist rituals contain many of the classic elements of the Indian puja rituals. For example, many of the elements of the Indian pujas can be found in the Lotus Samādhi outlined by the Tiantai patriarch Zhiyi in his Great Calming and Contemplation. As noted by Swanson, this practice contains the following ten elements:

1. Arrange and purify the room: the room must be cleaned, a copy of the Lotus sutra placed in a dais, incense is lit, and so on.
2. Purification of the body: bathing in scented water and changing to clean clothing
3. Making physical, verbal, and mental offerings: this includes ritual prostration, giving rise to bodhicitta, and the recitation of a prayer to the three jewels.
4. Petitioning the Buddhas and bodhisattvas: one recites several ritual formulas
5. Paying homage to the Buddhas through the recitation of several verses and formulas.
6. The “fivefold repentance”: (1) repenting the offences one has committed through the six senses, (2) ask the buddhas to teach Dharma, (3) rejoicing in the virtue of buddhas and bodhisattvas, (4) transference of merit, (5) sincerely taking the bodhisattva vows to save all beings.
7. Circumambulating a buddha statue while reciting phrases of homage
8. Reciting the Lotus Sūtra (either the whole sutra or in part)
9. Sitting meditation contemplating the nature of all things
10. Realizing the true nature of reality

=== Gongyo and Otsutome in Japanese Buddhism ===
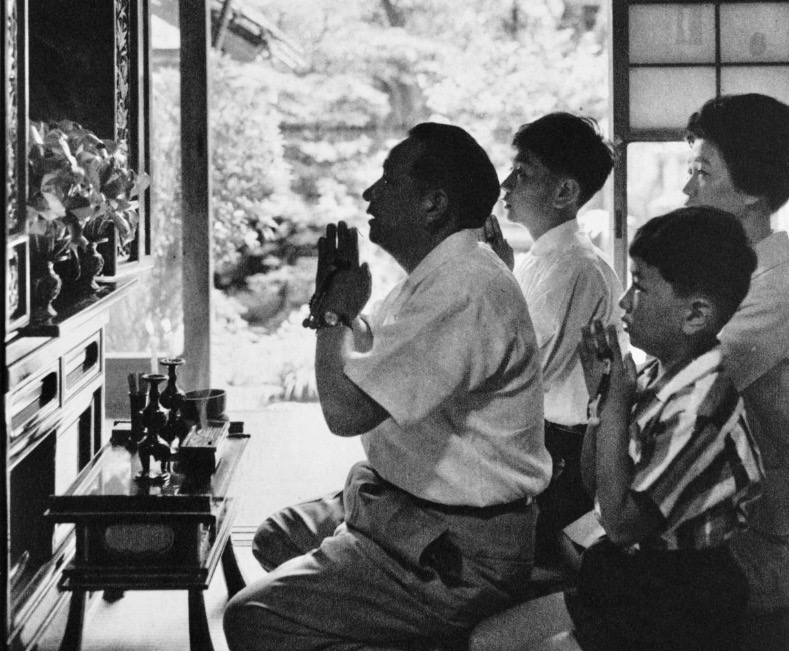
Nichiren Buddhists performing Gongyo in front of the family butsudan

Numerous Japanese Buddhist tradition make use of a daily ritual puja liturgies known as Gongyo (勤行, "assiduous practice") or Otsutome (お勤め), which translates to "service." Gongyo / Otsutome is typically performed in the morning and evening in front of a butsudan or Buddhist shrine to create a consistent rhythm of daily religious practice. These rituals are practiced across various schools, including Nichiren Buddhism, Tendai, Shingon, and Jōdo-shū. While specific liturgies vary by sect, the practice generally aims to fuse the practitioner's life with the enlightened life of the Buddha, contributing to the development of faith, wisdom and mindfulness.

The content of the liturgy reflects the unique doctrinal focus of each tradition, drawing heavily from essential sutras. For example, in Nichiren Buddhism, Gongyo often consists of reciting portions of the 2nd (Hoben) and 16th (Juryo) chapters of the Lotus Sutra, followed by the primary chant of the daimoku. The Tendai tradition utilizes an eclectic approach, incorporating elements from the Lotus Sutra alonside Pure Land and esoteric elements. In Shingon Buddhism, the service is an occasion to join the "Three Mysteries" of the Buddha's body, speech, and mind with the practitioner's own functions through specific mantras and meditation. For Jōdo-shū practitioners, the foundation of Otsutome is the Nenbutsu (reciting "Namu Amida Butsu") and selected passages from the Pure Land sutras.

The physical performance of Gongyo emphasizes a correct and respectful posture and attitude, as practitioners are taught to behave as if they were meeting the Buddha himself. Believers may sit in the traditional Japanese seiza (kneeling) style, cross-legged, or in a chair with both feet flat on the ground, ensuring the spine is straight and the hands are placed together in gassho (prayer position). Sensory elements and ritual tools play a vital role in facilitating a focused environment for the service. The ritual often incorporates the striking of a bell to draw attention and remind the practitioner to be focused. Candles are lit to represent the "lamp of Dharma" and the light of wisdom, while the offering of incense serves as a symbolic cleansing of the practitioner's body and mind. Many traditions also include offerings of rice, water, or flowers placed before the altar. In some practices, prayer beads (juzu) are used to count repetitions of chants, serving as a reminder that the practice is an accumulative process requiring dedication.

The overarching purpose of this daily discipline is to cultivate a religious consciousness, eradicate past negative karma, and build a connection with the Buddhas and bodhisattvas. For religious followers, it functions as a daily ritual frame for the day. The morning service sets a correct spiritual bearing for the day, while the evening service provides a moment for reflection and the confession of misdeeds. Every service concludes with the transference of merit, wherein the benefits gained from the practice are dedicated to the enlightenment and salvation of all sentient beings. Nichiren famously compared such persistent practice to flowing water, noting that those who always persist in their faith resemble the steady, unending flow of a stream. Much like the way consistent polishing transforms a dull stone into a brilliant mirror, the daily repetition of Gongyo is intended to refine the practitioner’s heart into a clear reflection of the Buddha's wisdom.

== See also ==
- Buddhānussati
- Sacca-kiriya
- Learning the Buddha Dhamma
- Dana (Buddhism)
- Ethical Conduct (Buddhism)
- Spiritual Cultivation (Buddhism)
- Contemplation (Buddhism)
- Meditation (Buddhism)
- Chanting (Buddhism)
- Devotion (Buddhism)
- Householder (Buddhism)

== Bibliography ==
- Harvey, Peter (1990). An introduction to Buddhism: Teachings, history and practices. Cambridge: Cambridge University. ISBN 0-521-31333-3.
- Indaratana Maha Thera, Elgiriye (2002). Vandana: The Album of Pali Devotional Chanting and Hymns. Penang, Malaysia:Mahindarama Dhamma Publication. Retrieved 2007-10-22 from "BuddhaNet" at
- Kariyawasam, A.G.S. (1995). Buddhist Ceremonies and Rituals of Sri Lanka (The Wheel Publication No. 402/404). Kandy, Sri Lanka: Buddhist Publication Society. Retrieved 2007-10-23 from "Access to Insight" (1996 transcription) at https://www.accesstoinsight.org/lib/authors/kariyawasam/wheel402.html#ch3.
- Kapleau, Philip (1989b). Zen: Merging of East and West. NY:Anchor Book. ISBN 0-385-26104-7.
- Khantipalo, Bhikkhu (1982). Lay Buddhist Practice: The Shrine Room, Uposatha Day, Rains Residence (The Wheel No. 206/207). Kandy, Sri Lanka:Buddhist Publication Society. Retrieved 2007-10-22 from "Access to Insight" (transcribed 1995) at https://www.accesstoinsight.org/lib/authors/khantipalo/wheel206.html.
- Lee Dhammadharo, Ajaan & Thanissaro Bhikkhu (trans.) (1998). Visakha Puja. Retrieved 2007-10-22 from "Access to Insight" at https://www.accesstoinsight.org/lib/thai/lee/visakha.html.
- Nyanaponika Thera (2000). The Vision of Dhamma: Buddhist Writings of Nyanaponika Thera. Seattle: BPS Pariyatti Editions. ISBN 1-928706-03-7.
- Soni, R.L. & Bhikkhu Khantipalo (2006). Life's Highest Blessings: The Maha Mangala Sutta. Retrieved 2007-10-22 from "Access to Insight" at https://www.accesstoinsight.org/lib/authors/soni/wheel254.htm%5B%5D.
