= Jinapañjara Gāthā =

Buddhist devotional text used for recitation and meditation

The Jinapanjara (Pali: jinapañjara; Thai: ชินบัญชร, Chinabanchon), sometimes known in English as "The Armor of the Conqueror", is a post-canonical Buddhist Paritta chant. It is the most popular paritta (protective text) in Thailand. It has existed since the end of the nineteenth century, from the time of the reign of Rama II. It is assumed that the Jinapanjara was authored by a Lanna Buddhist monk. Later, the monk Somdet To Brahmaramsi modified the incantation and made it more complete, by translating the content and curtailing some parts in the chant with unknown meaning. The text can also be found in Myanmar and Sri Lanka.

== Terminology ==
The meaning of Jinapanjara is 'the armor of the Buddha'. Jinapanjara is the combination of two words, Jina meaning 'the winner', which is the Buddha, and Panjara meaning 'cage'. Thus, Jinapanjara means 'the cage (which is strong as a piece of armor) that can protect from any dangers and enemies'.

== History ==
Historians have found no evidence of the original author, nor where Jinapanjara was composed, but the text is mentioned in ancient Burmese scriptures. The scriptures state that Jinapanjara was written in Chiang Mai in the era of King Anawrahta Minsaw (1044 – 1077). Because of the popularity of animistic rituals considered in violation of Buddhist principles, Anawrahta consulted with the monastic community and decreed to his citizens to chant the Jinapanjara text instead. Hence, Jinapanjara was authored by Thai monks in Chiang Mai and its chanting became widespread in Myanmar and Sri Lanka.

There are two well-known adaptations of the Jinapanjara in Thailand. The first version was adapted by Somdej Toh at Wat Rakhangkhositraram Woramahavihan and was further revised by Pra Pattaramuni at Wat Thong Noppakun. Another version was adapted by Nyanasamvara Suvaddhana. Both version have the same meaning, but differ slightly in pronunciation and spelling.

There also exists a Sinhalese text called the Cūḷajinapañjara paritta. Some Sinhalese scholars also use the title Dasa disa piritha while referring to the Cūḷajinapañjara. In total, there exist 3 recensions of the Jinapanjara Gatha.

== See also ==
- Awgatha
- Buddhist chant
- Paritta
- Samatha
- Smot (chanting)
- Vipassanā
