= Khuddakapāṭha =

- SuttaCentral; OpenTipitaka
- Type: Canonical text
- Parent: Khuddaka Nikāya
- Attribution: Bhāṇaka
- Aṭṭhakathā: Paramatthajotikā (Khuddakapāṭha-aṭṭhakathā)
- Commentator: Buddhaghosa
- Abbreviation: Kp; Khp

The Khuddakapāṭha (Pāli for "short passages"; abbreviated as "Khp") is a Theravāda Buddhist scripture, the first collection of discourses (suttas) in the Khuddaka Nikāya of the Pāli Canon. It may have originated as a handbook for novice monks composed from excerpts of canonical texts.

== History ==
The Khuddakapāṭha was excluded from the lists of canonical texts collected by the Theravāda Dīgha- and Majjhima-bhāṇakas as well as the Chinese translation of Buddhaghosa's commentaries. This suggests that the Khuddakapāṭha had not attained canonical status until relatively late in the process of fixing the Theravāda canon, and may be one of the last texts added to the Canon itself.

All but one of the discourses it collects are found elsewhere in the Pāli Canon—the Nidhi Kanda is not extant in the current Pāli Canon but does include text [Khp 8.9] quoted in the Abhidhamma Piṭaka's Kathāvatthu [Kv 351,18-21].) It may have originated as a handbook for novices composed from excerpts from the canon, and was accepted as canonical because it consisted of texts that were already part of the Canon. The Khuddakapāṭha is not widely used or studied in modern Theravāda countries, but several of its texts are included in a common Paritta collection (the Maha Pirit Potha), suggesting that this collection originated with the Khuddakapāṭha or a precursor text.

== Contents ==
The collection is composed of the following nine discourses:

1. "Going for Refuge" (Saraṇattayam)
2. "Ten Precepts" (Dasasikkhapadam)
3. "Thirty-two Parts [of the Body]" (Dvattimsākāro)
4. "Novice's Questions" (Kumārapañha)
5. "Discourse on Blessings" (Maṅgala Sutta)
6. "Discourse on Treasures" (Ratana Sutta)
7. "[Hungry Shades] Outside the Wall Chapter" (Tirokutta Sutta)
8. "Reserve Fund Chapter" (Nidhikanda Sutta)
9. "Discourse on Lovingkindess" (Mettā Sutta)

== Translations ==
- Tr R. C. Childers, in Journal of the Royal Asiatic Society, 1869
- Tr F. L. Woodward, in Some Sayings of the Buddha, 1925
- "The text of the minor sayings", in Minor Anthologies of the Pali Canon, volume I, tr C. A. F. Rhys Davids, 1931, Pali Text Society, Bristol
- "The Minor rRadings", in 1 volume with "The illustrator of Ultimate Meaning", its commentary, tr Ñāṇamoli, 1960, Pali Text Society, Bristol

== Sources ==
- CSCD Tipitaka Version 2.0. A compiled CD-ROM with the Sixth Sangha Council's Tipitaka collection.
