= Apaga River =

Apaga is a river mentioned in the Indian epic Mahabharata. It is named as flowing through the Madra Kingdom.
