= Maṅgala Sutta =

Buddhist scripture in Pali Canon

Translations of Maṅgala Sutta
- English: Discourse of 'good omen','auspices' or 'good fortune'
- Sanskrit: महामङ्गलसूत्र mahāmaṅgalasūtra
- Burmese: မင်္ဂလသုတ် (MLCTS: Mingala Thok)
- Japanese: 吉祥経
- Khmer: មង្គលសូត្រ (UNGEGN: Mongkolasot)
- Sinhala: මහා මංගල සූත්‍රය (mahā maṅgala sūtraya)
- Tamil: மகா மங்கள சூத்திரம்
- Tibetan: བཀྲ་ཤིས་ཆེན་པོའི་མདོ།
- Thai: มงคลสูตร

The Maṅgala Sutta is a discourse (Pali: sutta) of Gautama Buddha on the subject of 'blessings' (mangala, also translated as 'good omen' or 'auspices' or 'good fortune'). In this discourse, Gautama Buddha describes 'blessings' that are wholesome personal pursuits or attainments, identified in a progressive manner from the mundane to the ultimate spiritual goal. In Sri Lanka, this sutta considered to be part of "Maha Pirith".

This discourse is recorded in Theravada Buddhism's Pali Canon's Khuddaka Nikaya in two places: in the Khuddakapāṭha (Khp 5), and in the Sutta Nipāta (Sn 2.4). In the latter source, the discourse is called the Mahāmangala Sutta. It is also traditionally included in books of 'protection' (paritta). It is also found in the Tibetan Canon, in the Kangyur (བཀའ་འགྱུར།).

== Content ==
The discourse was preached at Jetavana Temple in answer to a question asked by a deva as to which things in this world could truly be considered blessings (mangalāni). The sutta describes thirty-eight blessings in ten sections, as shown in the table below:

Gp.1	Not associating with fools	Associating with the wise	Expressing respect to those worthy of respect		
Gp.2	Living in an amenable location	Having meritorious deeds (Good Karma) in one's past	Setting oneself up properly in life		
Gp.3	Learnedness	Artfulness	Self-discipline	Artful speech	
Gp.4	support father & mother	Cherishing one's children	Cherishing one's spouse	Peaceful occupations	
Gp.5	Generosity	Dhamma practice	Caring for extended family	Blameless actions	
Gp.6	Avoiding unwholesomeness	Not drinking intoxicants	Non-recklessness in the Dhamma		
Gp.7	Respect	Humility	Contentment	Gratitude	Listening regularly to Dhamma teachings
Gp.8	Patience	Be easily admonished	Sight of a True Monk	Regular discussion of the Dhamma	
Gp.9	Practising Austerities	Practising the Brahma-faring	Seeing the Four Noble Truths	Attainment of Nirvana	
Gp.10	Mind free of Worldly Vicissitudes	Sorrowlessness	Free of Subtle Defilements	Blissful Mind	

== Traditional context ==
The post-canonical Pali Commentary explains that at the time the sutta was preached there was great discussion over the whole of Jambudvipa regarding the definition of blessings. The devas heard the discussion and argued among themselves till the matter spread to the highest Brahmā world. Then it was that Sakka suggested that a deva should visit the Buddha and ask him about it.

This sutta is one of the suttas at the preaching of which countless devas were present and countless beings realized the Truth.

== Uses ==
The sutta is often recited, and forms one of the commonest pieces of chanting used for the Paritta. To have it written down in a book is considered an act of great merit.

== History ==
King Dutugamunu of Anuradhapura preached the Mangala Sutta at the Lohapasada.

The preaching of the Mangala Sutta was one of the incidents of the Buddha's life represented in the Relic Chamber of the Ruwanwelisaya.

== See also ==
- Four Noble Truths
- Metta Sutta
- Paritta - Traditional Buddhist "Protective Scriptures", including Mangala Sutta
- Ratana Sutta
- Sutta Nipata

== Sources ==
- Rhys Davids, T.W. & William Stede (eds.) (1921-5). The Pali Text Society's Pali–English Dictionary. Chipstead: Pali Text Society. A general on-line search engine for the PED is available at http://dsal.uchicago.edu/dictionaries/pali/.
