= Sacca-kiriya =

Motif and concept found in Buddhism and other Indian religions

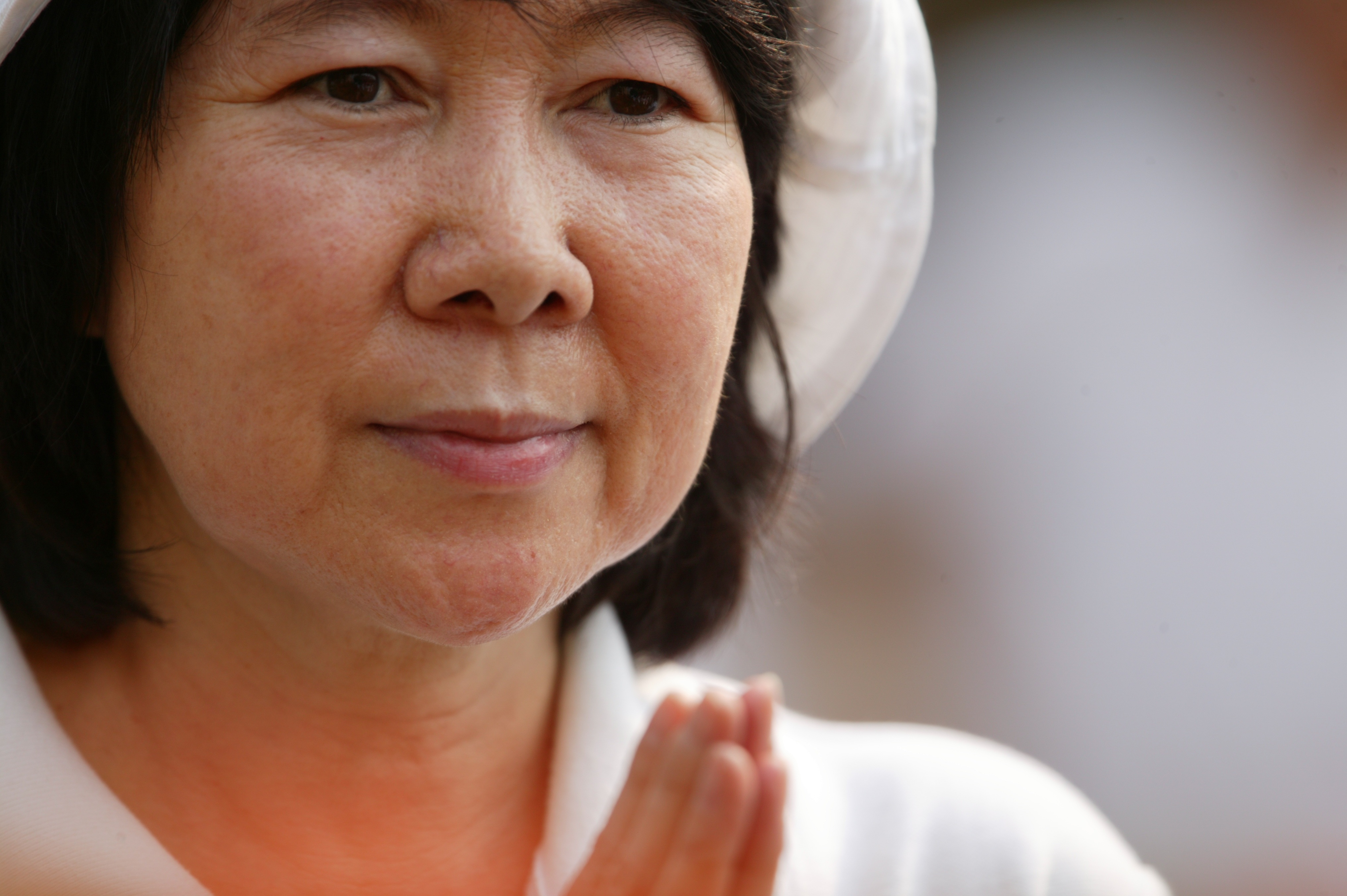
The motif of the sacca-kiriyā presumes a natural moral force operating in the world.

Sacca-kiriyā (Pāli; Sanskrit: satya-kriya, but more often: satyādhiṣṭhāna) (Note: Also known as Pali: saccavajja or Sanskrit: satyavādya; Pali: saccavacana or Sanskrit: satyavacana; satyopavācana, satyarākya, satyavākya, satyavacas or satyasrāvaṇā; or simply Pali: sacca or Sanskrit: satya.) is a solemn declaration of truth, expressed in ritual speech. Most often found in Buddhism, it can be an utterance with regard to one's own virtue, or with regard to a certain fact, followed by a command or resolution. Such a statement is believed to effect a wonder-working power that can benefit oneself and others, depending on the truthfulness of the person making the statement. The sacca-kiriyā is a motif found in the scriptural stories from the Pāli Canon and its commentaries, as well as in post-canonical works such as the Milindapañhā and the Avadānas. In these stories it is found usually as a blessing, but sometimes as a curse. The motif can also be found in Hindu and Jain texts.

The sacca-kiriyā presumes a moral force of truth that is operating in the world, and is stronger than gods or humans. Although sacca-kiriyā often refer to characteristics of the Buddha, the Buddhist teaching, and the monastic community, it can also refer to facts with regard to natural phenomena, such as the sun or the moon. Some scholars believe that the effectiveness of a sacca-kiriyā as portrayed in stories depends on virtue and good character, whereas other scholars understand the sacca-kiriyā to be merely about speaking according to facts. Scholars theorize that the sacca-kiriyā is an ancient belief that precedes Buddhism, but was used in Buddhism as a teaching device to explain Buddhist ethics and other teachings. The principles underlying the sacca-kiriyā have also been connected with Mahatma Gandhi's ideal of non-violent resistance, and many other aspects of Asian culture and religious life.

== Definition ==
O great king, is there such a thing in this world as truth, by means of which truth-speakers perform an act of truth?

— Milindapañhā 4.1.42, quoted in Thompson 1998

Sacca-kiriyā is a compound noun that derives from the root verb saccikaroti, meaning 'to bring before one's eyes, see face to face, realize, experience, attain'. A sacca-kiriya is a solemn asseveration with regard to the truth, expressed as a ritualized speech act. It is usually a truthful utterance with regard to having performed a certain virtue, followed by a command or resolution, called a 'truth-command' (Pali: saccādhiṭṭhānaṃ, Sanskrit: satyādiṣṭhāna). The sacca-kiriyā will usually contain a phrase "By this truth may..." (Pali: Etena saccavajjena...) or "By this power may..." (Pali: tejasa...), followed by the command or wish. It is generally made with a specific end in mind, such as to control a spirit, a physical object, or cause something to be done. Other examples given in the traditional literature are restoring eyesight after blindness, causing other living beings to help, causing pregnancy, and causing a sea to retreat. Virtues referred to are to have never hurt a living being, having performed generosity, kindness, religious devotion and other virtues. The truthfulness in these virtues is considered the "ground" (Pali: vatthu) for the realization of the sacca-kiriyā, but the ground need not be causally related to it. Sometimes, the sacca-kiriyā is finished with certain symbolic rituals, such as the pouring of water, bathing and putting on new garments, and so forth. The sacca-kiriyā is always a formal act. Indologist George Thompson uses the term "performative utterance" as coined by philosopher J. L. Austin, because the sacca-kiriyā manages to realize the statement "in the very uttering".

The Indic sacca-kiriyā is in its essence very similar to oaths that can be found in ancient Indo-European literature. It differs, however, in that the speaker does not necessarily commit to a course of action, but rather expresses a performative utterance, which is immediate and miraculous in nature.

== Well-known examples ==
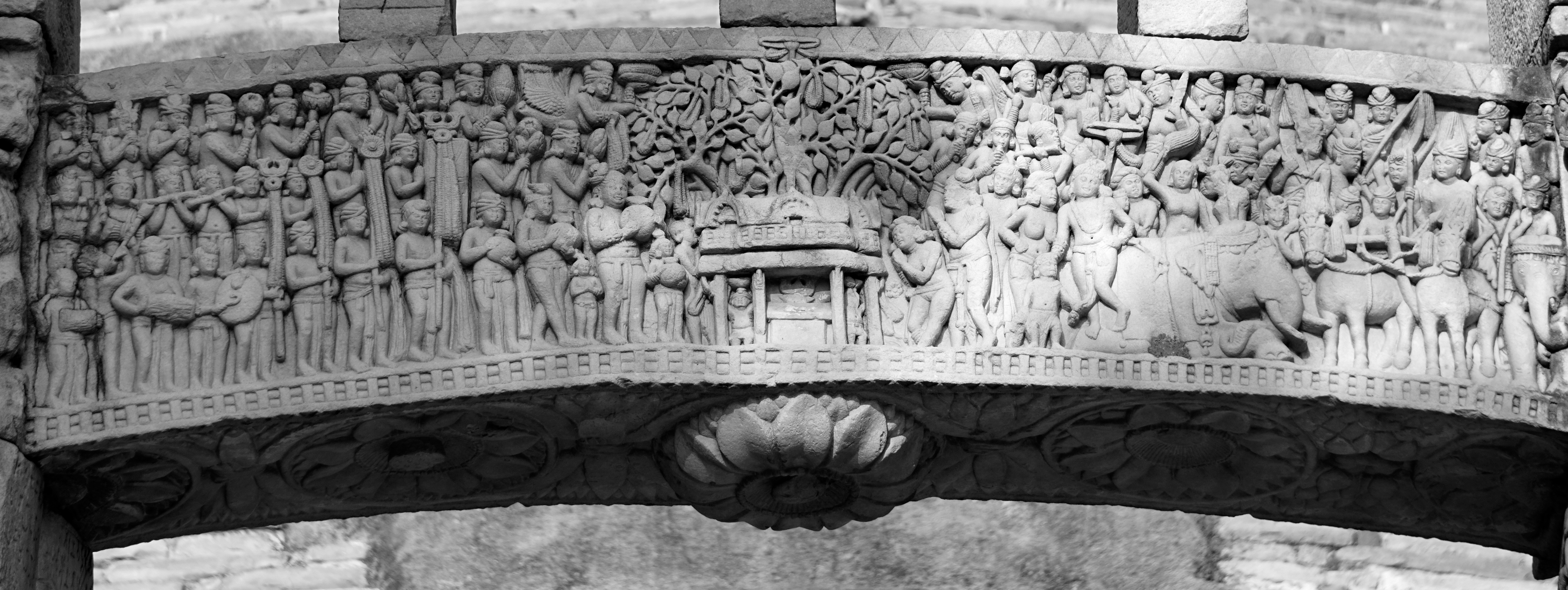
Visit of King Ashoka to the Bodhi Tree.

There are many examples in literature and in Asian history of people making a sacca-kiriyā. The most well-known is that of the Buddha himself. On the evening of his enlightenment, as the Buddha is about to attain enlightenment, he is challenged by Māra, the Buddhist personification of evil. Māra tries to stop the Buddha from attaining enlightenment by accusing him of having no right to sit on the seat beneath the tree of enlightenment, and challenging him to find a witness to his claim of enlightenment. The Buddha-to-be then calls Mother Earth to testify of his perfections of virtue on the evening of his enlightenment, the earth symbolizing truth and righteousness. He refers to the virtues he has practiced for many lifetimes. When the earth confirms the Buddha's claims, Māra retreats. In another example, the Buddha-to-be places a bowl upon the surface of the water. He declares that if he is to attain Buddhahood that evening, let the bowl float upwards against the stream, which then happens according to his declaration. In another widely quoted Jātaka story, a quail is about to see its nest and fellow birds consumed by a forest fire. After the bird makes a statement about the "efficacy of virtue" (Pali: sīla-gunṇa) and "efficacy of truth" (Pali: sacca-guṇa), and by expanding on the virtues of the Buddhas in the past, the fire miraculously retreats.

A legendary example of a sacca-kiriyā referring to a future act is emperor Ashoka, who vows that by the truth of his intention to support and sustain Buddhism, a dying Bodhi Tree may be saved, which then happens according to his vow. Another example raised by Indologist Richard Gombrich is that of the Sri Lankan King Duṭṭhagāmaṇi, who used a sacca-kiriyā in warfare. And more recently, the Buddhist reformer Anagārika Dharmapāla referred to his good intentions for restoring the pilgrimage site Bodh Gaya into Buddhist hands, and resolved that by those intentions help would come in this campaign.

Tradition	Name text	Speaker	Truth referred to in the story	Statement made
Theravāda Buddhism	Sivi Jātaka	King Sivi	giving his eyes away	"If this saying is true, may the eye be restored!"
Theravāda Buddhism	Milindapañhā	the courtesan Bindumatī	freedom from fondness and contempt towards her clients	to cause the great Ganges to flow against the current
Theravāda Buddhism	Paṇḍara Jātaka	a snake king	that an ascetic is deceiving the snake king	"If this saying is true, let your head split into seven pieces!"
Theravāda Buddhism	Maccha Jātaka	a fish	never having devoured any other fishes	to cause the rain to fall during a drought
Theravāda Buddhism	Kañhadipayana Jātaka	a mother of a sick child	not having loved her husband	to have the poison removed from her child's body
Mūlasarvāstivāda	Divyāvadāna	Ānanda, disciple of the Buddha	the Triple Gem is supreme in the world	to heal and make the body of a maimed man whole again
Theravāda Buddhism	Commentary to the Dhammapada	Uttarā	not being angry with Sirimā, a courtesan who had a relationship with her husband	"If I cherish anger towards her, may this ghee burn me. If not, may it not burn me."
Theravāda Buddhism	Commentary to the Dhammapada	Puṇṇa	giving to the monk Sāriputta without reserve	"May I be a partaker of the Dhamma you have yourself beheld"
Theravāda Buddhism	Jātaka	Prince Siddhattha	to become enlightened in the future	throwing a hairknot in the air and letting it remain stationed there
Vedic and Sanskrit literature	Mahābhārata	Damayanti	her chastity	May her real husband reveal himself to her, and the gods disguising as her husband fail to disguise themselves.
Jainism	Pārśavanātha Caritra	a queen	her husband, the king, has practiced charity in mind	be able to cross a wild river

Examples of sacca-kiriyā in Indic literature

== Motifs and principles ==
The sacca-kiriyā is a motif found in the stories of the Buddhist Pali Canon and its commentaries, as well as in post-canonical works such as the Milindapañhā and the Avadānas. The motif can also be found in Hindu and Jain texts. The motif of the sacca-kiriyā presumes a natural moral force operating in the world. In some stories, as well as in aspirations recorded in inscriptions, mention is also made of merit (Pali: puñña; doing good works) as a force behind the miracles that occur. Sometimes the spiritual power of the Triple Gem (the Buddha, the Dhamma and the Saṅgha), or that of deities is also related to it. Nevertheless, the truth of the statement, its agreement to actual events or qualities, is the main principle that is believed to allow a sacca-kiriyā to work: in the words of Indologist Eugene Burlingame, "There is nothing that cannot be accomplished by the Truth. Men, gods, powers of nature, all animate and inanimate things alike obey the Truth." In the Milindapañhā, considered the locus classicus about sacca-kiriyā, the protagonist King Milinda asks how someone's eyesight (referring to a story of King Sivi) could be restored by divine means when this seems to contradict Buddhist doctrine. The monk Nāgasena's reply is that King Sivi did not receive divine help, nor is there a physical cause for the healing, but he was healed "by truth alone".

Although the sacca-kiriyā usually refers to a past act, sometimes devotees may refer to a future act which they will perform, or a good intention that has not yet been acted upon. Sometimes the sacca-kiriyā refers to a fact in the present, but the expressed wish refers to the future. This form is also known as an 'aspiration' (Pali: patthanā) and usually involves an aim in a future life. Moreover, a sacca-kiriyā can be performed for another person's benefit, for example to heal another person. In this case, the speaker may refer to the other's person virtue, rather than his own. Devotees performing a sacca-kiriyā may also refer to a truthful statement about the Triple Gem. An example of this is the statement that the Buddha is born "for the salvation of all beings". In the Buddhist text Ratana Sutta many other examples are given. Lastly, at times, a sacca-kiriya may refer to the reality of certain natural phenomena, such as the sun or moon, or the characteristics of certain places, or simply a factual statement, even a failure to do something or a mistake made. In general, however, the effectiveness of the utterance depends on the speaker's truthfulness and the religious merit the speaker possesses.

Buddhist tales relate that not only spiritually advanced people can perform a sacca-kiriyā, but also common people, although this is less common in pre-Buddhist Vedic literature. Furthermore, in the literature examples exist of people using a sacca-kiriyā to deceive or curse others, or in other ways act in an anti-social way. Even these people have the power to control the outside environment and people through a sacca-kiriyā. Certain people with an immoral reputation in the stories, such as the courtesan Bindumatī, are also depicted as being able to do miracles, based on a truthful statement they make. In the case of the courtesan the truth is that she is "free alike from fawning and contempt" for her clients, regardless of their caste. Buddhism scholar Luis Gómez argued that the truth of the courtesan was simply that she never denied being a courtesan.

Scholars are not in agreement what determines the power of the sacca-kiriyā. Judging from the story of courtesan Bindumatī, religion scholar Malcolm Eckel concludes that the sacca-kiriyā's power is in its underlying intention, not its words. However, South Asian Studies scholar Choy Fah Kong argues that intention is not the major factor that explains the power of the sacca-kiriyā, but rather whether the statement made agrees with facts. In studying examples from Vedic texts, Thompson concludes that the emphasis on self-assertion is a common characteristic in sacca-kiriyā statements, and that they are not necessarily morally motivated. Both disagree with Indologist William Norman Brown, who stressed that the sacca-kiriyā was mostly ethical rather than magical. On the other hand, Indologist Heinrich Lüders stated that the sacca-kiriyā is somewhere "in the middle between oath and magic".

== Origins ==
According to the Indologist Eugene Burlingame, the sacca-kiriyā derives from a belief found everywhere in the world, that truth has an inherent importance and power in it.

According to Burlingame, the sacca-kiriyā derives from a belief found everywhere in the world, which underlies many forms of religiosity, both of major religions and of folk religion: the belief that truth has an inherent importance and power in it. He adds, however, that at times it may simply be a deux ex machina device to facilitate story-telling.

Indologist William Norman Brown argued that the sacca-kiriyā is based on "truth of life, personal integrity, truth in one's personal conduct in its totality, truth in acceptance of responsibilities and fulfillment of them". Through this personal integrity, the speaker of the sacca-kiriyā "can bend the cosmic forces to his will". Brown believed that this interpretation of the sacca-kiriya dates back as early as the Rig Veda (1700–1100 BCE). For this argument, Brown referred to an ancient Vedic belief that human beings could derive a power out of truth by fulfilling their duties (Sanskrit: vrata) according to the cosmic order (Sanskrit: ṛta). Brown, as well as Indologist Heinrich Zimmer, described the sacca-kiriyā as such perfect and moral fulfillment of duty, referring to examples in Buddhist Scriptures and the Hindu Bhagavadgītā. This fulfillment implies a high commitment to a virtue or vow and a sense of sacrifice to that end. Zimmer further argued that living one's life in a virtuous way like this, is in itself a sacca-kiriyā.

Thompson and Kong reject Brown's theory, however, both arguing that Brown is applying anachronisms. Kong states that such a belief had not yet developed in Vedic times. Thompson takes issue with the moral nature of Brown's theory. Kong also rejects that the sacca-kiriyā is a fulfillment of duty, and argues that it is more a statement of fact. Kong, as well as Lüders, do concur that as early as the Rig Veda and Atharvaveda, a belief is attested with regard to the efficacy of utterances of truth. Kong does describe the sacca-kiriyā as a pre-Buddhist "old belief". She does not believe it had much to do with fulfillment of duties, however. Drawing from textual analysis of Indic and other ancient Indo-European sources, Thompson also argues that the sacca-kiriyā was a pre-Buddhist practice, popular and widespread.

Kong theorizes that the idea of ṛta as cosmic order should be understood in terms of the original meaning of the word ṛta as 'truth'. The ancient Indians believed that the world was created through the working-power of speech. She also relates the motif of sacca-kiriyā to the ancient practice of calling out the names of gods and requesting something of them. The working-power of the sacca-kiriyā does not lie in its moral intention or fulfillment of duty, but rather whether the utterance agrees with the facts. Furthermore, for the ancient Buddhists, the fact that the Buddha never spoke untruth in itself provided the devotee with miraculous power. She construes that this ancient belief about the power of truthful facts has later been misunderstood by Buddhist commentators, and instead explained as the power of meditative attainment (Pali: jhāna), the power of loving-kindness and the power of morality. However, she continues, these are not the actual manifestations of truth: only through the manifestation of truth, i.e. the spoken word that corresponds with facts, can a sacca-kiriyā be accomplished.

With regard to the sacca-kiriyā scholars point out that speaking untruth in early Buddhist ethics was highly condemned, often more so than other vices: in other words, truthful speech was very important to Buddhist ethics.

== Influence on Asian societies ==
=== Practice in religions from India ===
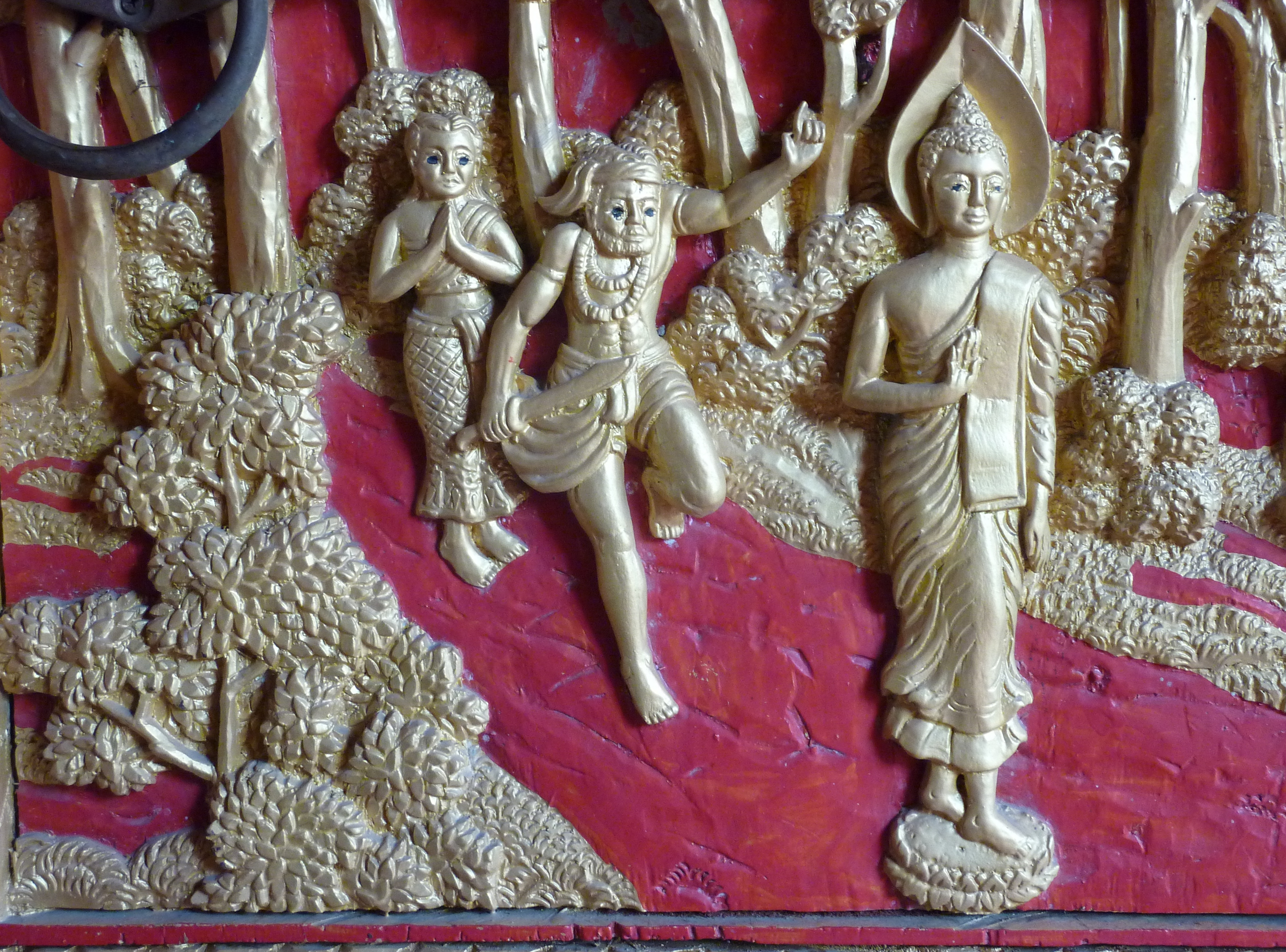
Aṅgulimāla charging to kill the Buddha.

In a story about the disciple Aṅgulimāla, he performs a sacca-kiriyā to help a woman deliver a baby safely. The words recorded in the story have become one of the paritta recitations, still chanted today for pregnant women. This example shows that the power of truth can still be invoked later, "even when the person who first set the truth in motion has left the scene". The blessing of Aṅgulimāla is believed to be a means to tap into Aṅgulimāla's power. Just like the Aṅgulimāla Sutta, the Ratana Sutta and other parittas are therefore still chanted today, as part of blessings given on special occasions. These texts will usually contain phrases typical for a truth-command in a sacca-kiriyā, followed by a wish for the listeners.

Kong argues that the worship of relics in the early centuries of Buddhist history was based on the principle of sacca-kiriyā. Thus, early Buddhists, as well as Theravādins, believed that a resolve made in front of the relics of an enlightened person could come true. They believed this not because of the invisible presence of the deceased master, but rather because of the truthfulness of the enlightened person: because the relics were of somebody who was believed to be "incapable of speaking false speech", what was said in front of the master's relics had also to come true. In Pure Land Buddhism, following a similar belief, the power of the vow that Amitābha Buddha once took to help all living beings can be invoked again by Pure Land devotees today. They can do so by calling Amitābha's name, because "his Name is the Vow".

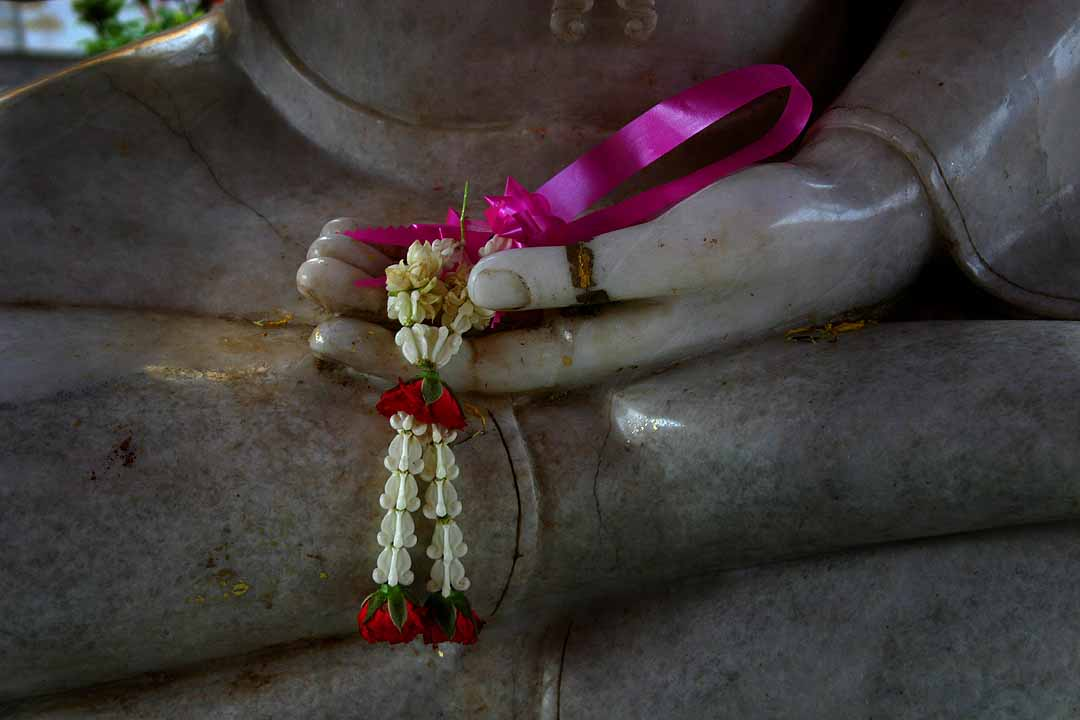
When devotees offer flowers to a Buddha image, they may make a resolve for enlightenment, as a form of sacca-kiriyā.

Also, the principles of sacca-kiriya have been connected to the confessions of Buddhist and Jain monks. Moreover, the idea of the sacca-kiriyā may have motivated the aspirations (Pali: patthanā) of ancient Buddhists as found in Buddhist scriptures and epigraphical findings, and informed devotional practices. For example, when devotees offer flowers to a Buddha image, they may make a resolve for enlightenment, based on the truth of the impermanence of the flowers on the one hand (a natural phenomenon), and based on the power of the accumulated merit on the other hand. Kong adds to that,

Though the verse of offering flowers is recited in front of an image of the Buddha, it is not a prayer to the Buddha. Rather, it is an aspiration that is uttered on the basis of the belief in the power of truth utterance.

Kong concludes that the teachings on the efficacy of merit-making activities and the transference of such merit is "promoted and sustained" by the belief in the sacca-kiriyā. Other Buddhist teachings such as those about the pāramis (virtues to be developed to be a Buddha), karma, loving-kindness, as well as the spiritual power of the Triple Gem and the worship of relics among Theravādins, have also been explained using the pre-Buddhist belief in sacca-kiriyā. The motif of the sacca-kiriyā has also affected how the Hindu Upaniṣads explain Hindu doctrine. The Chāndogya Upaniṣad, for example, explains the doctrine on the self by an example of a sacca-kiriyā performed by a thief.

=== Gandhian philosophy ===
Scholars have further linked the concept of sacca-kiriyā to Gandhi's ideal of non-violent resistance (Sanskrit: satyāgraha), literally meaning 'strict adherence to truth'. (Note: Historian Dietmar Rothermund did point out that Gandhi was not familiar with the term sacca-kiriyā.) Satyāgraha, as Zimmer states, was based on Gandhi's "love of truth and dharma", and scholars argue that non-violence was Gandhi's sacca-kiriyā, which defined his satyāgraha. Gandhi scholar Veena Howard does point out, however, that Gandhi's satyāgraha was a political community ideal, and was not limited to the individual as in the accounts of sacca-kiriyā. Furthermore, in Gandhi's satyāgraha, the divine will played an important role, whereas in the traditional sacca-kiriyā this was not the case. Nevertheless, Gandhi's concept of God was abstract and impersonal, and with regard to the sacca-kiriyā, religion scholar Arvind Sharma notes that Gandhi equated God with truth, or even placed truth above God, and morality above the metaphysical.

Brown argued that the idea of the sacca-kiriyā has not only influenced Gandhian philosophy, but has also inspired the national Indian motto Satyaṃ eva jayate, meaning 'Truth alone conquers', originating from the Muṇḍaka Upaniśad.

=== Other applications ===
Xuanzang (602–664 CE)

Sacca-kiriyās may have been used as a device to prove someone's innocence or truthfulness during an ordeal, as has been recorded in ancient Indian epics and classical dramas. This involved entering into a fire, and it was believed the innocent would survive the ordeal by the power of their truthfulness, expressed through a sacca-kiriyā. However, in a Jain story relating a fire-ordeal, the accused survives by admitting her wrongdoing, rather than her innocence. Brown did not think that such ordeals were actual sacca-kiriyā, though, as such passages merely teach "the widespread belief that Truth protects the righteous".

Other applications of the sacca-kiriyā have also been observed. A sacca-kiriyā is inscribed at the gateway of the first stupa (monument) at Sanchi with a deterrent statement to the effect that a vandal of the stupa will be cursed. Also, the Vedic ṛṣi poets would usually close their hymns with a sacca-kiriyā. Furthermore, statements very similar to the sacca-kiriyā were part of religious debates in ancient India, as the participants of the debate wagered their own lives, should they follow incorrect procedure during the debates. Thus, participants of debates are found to put their lives on the line in this manner in the Upaniṣads, in early Buddhist discourses, and in the accounts of the Chinese pilgrim Xuan Zang (602–664 CE).

The motif of the sacca-kiriyā continues to feature in South-Asian literature, up until recent centuries. For example, Asian Studies scholar Keller Kimbrough writes that 18th-century Japanese poems contain statements very similar to a sacca-kiriya. Sometimes used to conjure rain and alleviate drought, it was believed that such poetry had to be written with an honest intention to be effective.

Apart from applications in religions that date from India, it has also been suggested some Zorastrianist texts can be explained as forms of sacca-kiriyā.

== See also ==
- Adhiṭṭhāna
- Merit-making and resolve
- Law of attraction (New Thought)
- Reality in Buddhism
- Truth in Buddhism
