= Ratana Sutta =

Buddhist sutta

The Ratana Sutta (Burmese: ရတနာသုတ်, Sinhala: රතන සූත්‍රය) is a Buddhist discourse (Pali: sutta) found in the Pali Canon's Sutta Nipata (Snp 2.1) and Khuddakapatha (Khp 7); with a parallel in the Mahavastu. In the Pali it is seventeen verses in length, and in the Sanskrit version nineteen. The Ratana Sutta extols the characteristics of the three ratana (Pali for "gem" or "jewel" or "treasure") in Buddhism: the Enlightened One (Buddha), the Teaching (Dhamma) and the noble community of disciples (ariya Sangha).

== Background ==
In Theravada Buddhism, according to post-canonical Pali commentaries, the background story for the Ratana Sutta is that the town of Vesali (or Visala) was being plagued by disease, non-human beings and famine; in despair, the townspeople called upon the Buddha for aid; he had the Ven. Ananda go through town reciting this discourse leading to the dispersal of the town's woes.

== Contents ==
The Ratana Sutta upholds the Three Jewels as follows:

- the Buddha as the unequalled Realized One (verse 3: na no samam atthi Tathagatena)
- the Teaching (dhamma) of:
  - Nirvana (verse 4: khayam viragam amatam panitam), and
  - the unsurpassed concentration (verse 5: samadhim) leading to Nirvana
- the noble Community (ariya sangha) for having:
  - attained Nirvana (verses 7: te pattipatta amatam vigayha),
  - realized the Four Noble Truths (verses 8-9: yo ariyasaccani avecca passati), and
  - abandoned the first three fetters (verse 10: tayas su dhamma jahita bhavanti) that bind us to samsara.

== Use ==
In Theravadin Buddhist countries and also in Navayana, this discourse is often recited as part of religious, public and private ceremonies for the purpose of blessing new endeavors and dispelling inauspicious forces.

== See also ==
- Maṅgala Sutta
- Metta Sutta
- Paritta - Traditional Buddhist "Protective Scriptures", including Ratana Sutta
- Tisarana - Three Refuges

== Sources ==
- Anandajoti Bhikkhu (ed., trans.) (2004). Safeguard Recitals. Kandy: Buddhist Publication Society. ISBN 955-24-0255-7.
- Bodhi, Bhikkhu (2004). "Sn 2.1 Ratana Sutta — Jewels [part 1]" (lecture). Retrieved as an mp3 from "Bodhi Monastery".
- Piyadassi Thera (ed., trans.) (1999). The Book of Protection: Paritta. Kandy: Buddhist Publication Society. Retrieved 08-14-2008 from "Access to Insight".
