= Paritta =

Protective scriptures in Buddhism

Translations of Paritta
- English: protection, safeguard
- Sanskrit: paritrana
- Pali: paritta
- Burmese: ပရိတ် (Parit) (MLCTS: pəjeiʔ)
- Indonesian: perlindungan
- Khmer: បរិត្ត (UNGEGN: Paret)
- Sinhala: පිරිත් (pirit)
- Thai: ปริตร; RTGS: parit

Paritta (Pali), generally translated as "protection" or "safeguard," refers to the specific Buddhist verses and discourses recited in order to ward off misfortune or danger, as well as to the practice of reciting the verses and discourses. The practice of reciting or listening to the paritta suttas began very early in the history of Buddhism.

== Uses ==
In the Pali literature, these short verses are recommended by the Buddha as providing protection from certain afflictions. The belief in the effective power to heal, or protect, of the sacca-kiriya, or asseveration of something quite true is an aspect of the work ascribed to the paritta.

It is also widely believed that all-night recitations of paritta by monks bring safety, peace and well-being to a community. Such recitations will also occur on auspicious occasions, such as the inauguration of a new temple or home or to provide blessings upon those who hear. Conversely, paritta discourses are recited on inauspicious occasions as well, such as at a funeral or on the death anniversary of a loved one. They may also be recited to placate antagonistic spirits. The Mahavamsa contains the earliest historical reference to this practice, describing how Upatissa I of Anuradhapura instructed monks to recite the Ratana Sutta through the night during a period when Sri Lanka was afflicted by plague and disease.

== Discourse types ==
There are several paritta verses that are identified as such within the Pali Canon.

=== Reverential ===
Most paritta involve offering praise to the Buddha or, more broadly, the Triple Gem (Buddha, Dhamma, Sangha). Of these paritta, one of the best known is the Ratana Sutta (Sn 2.1) where, for instance, it states in part:

Whatever treasure there be either here or in the world beyond, whatever precious jewel there be in the heavenly worlds, there is nought comparable to the Tathagata (the Perfect One). This precious jewel is the Buddha. By this (asseveration of the) truth may there be happiness.

=== Aid seeking ===
A few paritta involve the asking directly for the aid of the Buddha. Examples of this type of paritta verse can be seen in the Candima Sutta (SN 2.9) and Suriya Sutta (SN 2.10) of the Samyutta Nikaya. In these two scriptures, the deities Canda and Surya protect themselves from the attack of the eclipse deity Rahu by reciting short verses praising the Buddha and pleading for his protection:

"O Buddha, the Hero, thou art wholly free from all evil. My adoration to thee. I have fallen into distress. Be thou my refuge."

In these cases, the Buddha is shown as specifically hearing and responding to the paritta; he enjoins Rahu to release the captive deities rather than have his "head split into seven pieces".

=== Blessing ===
Another type of paritta relies on the virtue of the individual who is ascribed as reciting the paritta in the Canon, rather than making reference to the virtues of the Buddha. This type of paritta can be seen in the Angulimala Sutta, the story of the murderer-turned-monk Angulimala. On passing a pregnant woman experiencing a difficult labor, Angulimala is moved to provide assistance. Asking the Buddha how he can help, the Buddha tells him to provide a sort of blessing to the woman by reciting a short verse proclaiming his own virtue:

Sister, since I was born in the noble birth, I do not recall intentionally killing a living being. Through this truth may there be wellbeing for you, wellbeing for your fetus.

This verse is now used as a blessing for expectant mothers in the Theravada Buddhist tradition.

== Forms of expression ==
The Buddha and the arahants (the Consummate Ones) can concentrate on the paritta suttas without the aid of another. However, when they are ill, it is easier for them to listen to what others recite, and thus focus their minds on the dhamma that the suttas contain, rather than think of the dhamma by themselves. There are occasions, as in the case of illness, which weaken the mind (in the case of worldlings), when hetero-suggestion has been found to be more effective than autosuggestion. In the Gilana Sutta, even the Buddha Himself had the Seven Factors of Enlightenment recited to him by another monk to recover from a grave illness.

While paritta texts generally are recited aloud, other mediums are known as well. In Thailand, paritta texts are printed on small pieces of cloth containing images of the Buddha or famous monks. Similar text—often in the Khom Thai script—is sometimes incorporated into tattoos believed to have protective powers, known as Sak Yant.

== Collections ==
Paritta discourses are widely used and known, even if not necessarily understood, throughout the Theravada Buddhist world. Popular collections of paritta verses are among the most widely known Pali texts in many Theravada countries. Translations of Paritta texts have not proven to be particularly popular—they are often little easier to understand than the Pali texts themselves, and in popular belief it is not necessary to understand the recitation for it to be effective. Different Theravada regions have developed distinct sets of paritta repertoires.

=== Myanmar (Burma) ===
In Myanmar, the most popular paritta collection is called Mahāparitta (lit. 'Great Protection'), which comprises eleven texts, with eight derived from the Milindapañha and commentarial lists. The second is the called the Sīrimaṅgala-paritta, which was compiled by Prime Minister U Nu's Sīrimaṅgala Paritta Association in 1950. This collection consists of thirty-one texts, including eleven from Mahāparitta, and another twenty, including the Buddha's first sermon (Dhammacakkappavattana Sutta), a synopsis of the twenty-four conditions in the Paṭṭhāna, the seventh book of the Abhidhamma Piṭaka, and the Mahāsatipaṭṭhāna Sutta, which provides the textual basis for vipassanā meditation. The Paṭṭhāna is the single most popular paritta in Myanmar. Now follows the Mahāparitta collection and canonical sources by Ven Dr. Silananda Bhivamsa

1.	Paritta-Parikamma - Preliminary of Paritta ("preparation and invitation to devas")	Composed by compilers
2.	Maṅgala Sutta ("for blessings and prosperity")	Khp 3-4 ,Sn 308-9
3.	Ratana Sutta ("for getting free from dangers caused by disease, evil spirits and famine") •introductory passage • following two verses • remaining text	DhpA ii. 272 ,Khp 4-7 , Sn 312-5
4.	Mettā Sutta ("for suffusing all kinds of beings with loving-kindness")	Khp 10-12, Sn 300-1
5.	Khandha Sutta ("for protecting against snakes and other creatures")	Vinaya, iv. 245, AN i. 348, Ja no. 203
6.	Mora Sutta ("for protection against snares, imprisonment and for safety")	Ja no. 159
7.	Vaṭṭa Sutta ("for protection against fire")	Cp 415
8.	Dhajagga Sutta ("for protection against fear, trembling and horror")	Sn i 220-2
9.	Āṭānāṭiya Sutta ("for protection against evil spirits, and gaining health and happiness") •verses 104- 109 •verses 102, 103, 110-130 •verse 131	Dn iii. 159, Dhp verse 109,
10.	Aṅgulimāla Sutta ("for easy delivery for expectant mothers")	Mn ii. 306
11.	Bojjhaṅga Sutta ("for protection against and getting free from sickness and disease")	Sn iii. 71, 72, 73
12.	Pubbaṇha Sutta ("for protection against bad omens, etc., and gaining happiness")	Kp 5, Sn 312, An i 299,

=== Sri Lanka ===
The preferred paritta repertoire in Sri Lanka is known in Sinhala as the Pirit Potha ("The Book of Protection"), Maha Pirit Potha, or Catubhāṇavāraapali ("Text of the Four Recitals"). It has also been referred to as the "Buddhist Bible." Copies of this collection are common in the home of Sri Lankans, with children being instructed in the recitations in the morning and before bed. The most commonly recited texts are the Mangala Sutta, Ratana Sutta, Karaniya Metta Sutta, and Khuddakapatha. The most common versions of the Maha Pirit Potha may have originated from a precursor of the Khuddakapatha, which otherwise receives relatively little attention in Theravada countries.

The book typically contains a collection of twenty-four or twenty-nine discourses (suttas) (Note: Of the twenty-nine paritta texts listed below, Piyadassi (1999a) does not include the first five texts as part of the twenty-four discourses that he includes in the collection, although he identifies the first five texts as preliminary material. Anandajoti (2004) enumerates all twenty-nine texts as part of the paritta collection.) almost all delivered by the Buddha, and found scattered in the five original collections (nikayas) in Pali, which form the Sutta Pitaka, the "Canonical Discourses." Below, these discourses and related canonical sources are identified. (Note: Table based on Anandajoti (2004), pp. ix-xi.)

1.	Sarana-gamana ("Going for Refuge")	Khp 1
2.	Dasa-sikkhapada ("Ten Training Precepts")	Khp 2
3.	Samanera-pañha ("Novice Questions")	Khp 4
4.	Dvattimsakara ("32 Body Parts")	Khp 3
5.	Paccavekkhana ("Reflections on Monastic Requisites")	MN 2 (excerpt), passim
6.	Dasa-dhamma Sutta ("Ten Dhamma Discourse")	AN 10.48
7.	Mahamangala Sutta ("Great Blessings Discourse")	Khp 5, Sn 2.4
8.	Ratana Sutta ("Three Treasures Discourse")	Khp 6, Sn 2.1
9.	Karaniya Metta Sutta ("Friendly-kindness Discourse")	Khp 9, Sn 1.8
10.	Khandha-paritta ("Aggregates Protection")	AN 4.67
11.	Metta-anisamsa ("Friendly-kindness Advantages Discourse")	AN 11.16
12.	Mitta-anisamsa ("Friendship Advantages Discourse")	Ja 538
13.	Mora-paritta ("The Peacock's Protection")	Ja 159
14.	Canda-paritta ("The Moon's Protection")	SN 2.9
15.	Suriya-paritta ("The Sun's Protection")	SN 2.10
16.	Dhajagga-paritta ("Banner Protection")	SN 11.3
17.	Mahakassapa Thera Bojjhanga ("Elder Maha Kassapa's Factors of Awakening")	SN 46.14 (Gilana Sutta I)
18.	Mahamoggallana Thera Bojjhanga ("Elder Maha Moggalana's Factors of Awakening")	SN 46.15 (Gilana Sutta II)
19.	Mahacunda Thera Bojjhanga ("Elder Maha Cunda's Factors of Awakening")	SN 46.16 (Gilana Sutta III)
20.	Girimananda Sutta ("To Girimananda Discourse")	AN 10.60
21.	Isigili Sutta ("About Isigili Discourse")	MN 116
22.	Dhammacakkappavattana Sutta ("Setting in Motion the Dhamma Wheel Discourse")	SN 56.11
23.	Maha-samaya Sutta ("The Great Assembly Discourse")	DN 20
24.	Alavaka Sutta ("Concerning Alavaka Discourse")	SN 46.11
25.	Kasi Bharadvaja Sutta ("Farmer Bharadvaja Discourse")	Sn 1.4
26.	Parabhava Sutta ("On Ruin Discourse")	Sn 1.6
27.	Vasala Sutta ("On Outcasts Discourse")	Sn 1.7
28.	Sacca-vibhanga Sutta ("Analysis of the Truth Discourse")	MN 141
29.	Āṭānāṭiya Sutta ("Atanatiya Discourse")	DN 32

=== Thailand ===
In Thailand, the most important collection of paritta texts is The Royal Chanting Book, which was compiled by Saṅgharāja Sā Phussadeva under the sponsorship of King Chulalongkorn and published in 1880. The Royal Chanting Book comprises various parittas and suttas, and condensed versions of the three sections of the Pali canon, the Vinaya Piṭaka, Sutta Piṭaka and Abhidhamma Piṭaka, under the titles Phra Vinaya, Phra Sūtra, and Phra Paramartha, respectively. The Jinapañjara is the single most popular paritta in Thailand. For the case of Thai version paritta texts mention in The Royal Chanting Book, they have been classified in 2 categories including:

1. Cullarajaparitta which has 7 parittas or 7 tamnans according Thai Buddhist terminology)
2. Maharajaparitta which has 12 parittas or 12 tamnans according Thai Buddhist terminology) which cover all 7 suttas of Cullarajaparitta (1-7) and the other 5 suttas (8-12).

All 12 parittas can be listed as follows:

1.	Maṅgala Sutta (Maṅgala Paritta) ("for blessings and prosperity")	Khp 3-4 ,Sn 308-9
2.	Ratana Sutta (Maṅgala Paritta) ("for getting free from dangers caused by disease, evil spirits and famine") •introductory passage • following two verses • remaining text	DhpA ii. 272 ,Khp 4-7 , Sn 312-5
3.	Mettā Sutta (Maṅgala Paritta) "for suffusing all kinds of beings with loving-kindness")	Khp 10-12, Sn 300-1
4.	Khandha Sutta ("for protecting against snakes and other creatures")	Vinaya, iv. 245, AN i. 348, Ja no. 203
5.	Mora Sutta ("for protection against snares, imprisonment and for safety")	Ja no. 159
6.	Dhajagga Sutta ("for protection against fear, trembling and horror")	Sn i 220-2
7.	Āṭānāṭiya Sutta ("for protection against evil spirits, and gaining health and happiness") •verses 104- 109 •verses 102, 103, 110-130 •verse 131	Dn iii. 159, Dhp verse 109,
8.	Vaṭṭa Sutta ("for protection against fire")	Cp 415
9.	Aṅgulimāla Sutta ("for easy delivery for expectant mothers")	Mn ii. 306
10.	Bojjhaṅga Sutta ("for protection against and getting free from sickness and disease")	Sn iii. 71, 72, 73
11.	Abhaiya Sutta ("for protection against nightmare")	monks from Chiang Mai composed during the same time as Jinapañjara
12.	Jaya Sutta ("for victory and success in auspicious acts")	unknown

== See also ==
- Awgatha
- Buddhist chant
- Jinapañjara
- Lorica (prayer)
- Sacca-kiriyā
- Smot (chanting)

== Sources ==
- Anandajoti Bhikkhu (edition, trans.) (2004). Safeguard Recitals. Kandy: Buddhist Publication Society. ISBN 955-24-0255-7.
- Piyadassi Thera (trans. only) (1999a). The Book of Protection: Paritta. Kandy: Buddhist Publication Society. Retrieved 08-14-2008 from "Access to Insight".
- Piyadassi Thera (trans.) (1999b). Candima Sutta: The Moon Deity's Prayer for Protection (SN 2.9). Retrieved 08-14-2008 from "Access to Insight".
- Piyadassi Thera (trans.) (1999c). Gilana Sutta: Ill (Factors of Enlightenment) (SN 46.16). Retrieved 08-14-2008 from "Access to Insight".
- Piyadassi Thera (trans.) (1999d). Ratana Sutta: The Jewel Discourse (Sn 2.1). Retrieved 08-15-2008 from "Access to Insight".
- Piyadassi Thera (trans.) (1999e). Suriya Sutta: The Sun Deity's Prayer for Protection (SN 2.10). Retrieved 08-14-2008 from "Access to Insight".
- Rhys Davids, C.A.F., Dialogues of the Buddha, part 3.
- Rhys Davids, T.W. & William Stede (eds.) (1921-5). The Pali Text Society’s Pali–English Dictionary. Chipstead: Pali Text Society. A general on-line search engine for the PED is available at http://dsal.uchicago.edu/dictionaries/pali/.
- Thanissaro Bhikkhu (trans.) (2003). Angulimala Sutta: About Angulimala (MN 86). Retrieved 08-14-2008 from "Access to Insight".
