= Okāsa =

Burmese Buddhist prayer

An okāsa (Pāli; Burmese: ဩကာသ, Awgatha), sometimes known as the common Buddhist prayer, is a formulaic Theravada Buddhist prayer that is recited to initiate acts of Buddhist devotion, including obeisance to the Buddha and Buddhist monks and the water libation ritual. The term okāsa literally means "permission" in Pali, and is used to request permission to pay homage, seek forgiveness of any intentional and unintentional offenses, and precedes the undertaking of the Five Precepts.

== Standard prayer ==
=== Burmese tradition ===
Minor variations of this Burmese language prayer exist from one Buddhist monastery to another. In Burmese, okāsa (awgatha) explicitly references the gadaw of the Five Infinite Venerables (Buddha, Dhamma, Sangha, parents, and teachers).

ဩကာသ ၊ ဩကာသ ၊ ဩကာသ။

ကာယကံ ဝစီကံ မနောကံ၊ သဗ္ဗဒေါသ ခပ်သိမ်းသော အပြစ်တို့ကိုပျောက်ပါစေခြင်း အကျိုးငှာ ပထမ ဒုတိယ တတိယ၊ တစ်ကြိမ် နှစ်ကြိမ် သုံးကြိမ်မြောက်အောင် ဘုရားရတနာ၊ တရားရတနာ၊ သံဃာရတနာ ရတနာ မြတ်သုံးပါး (မိဘ၊ ဆရာသမား) တို့အား အရိုအသေ အလေးအမြတ် လက်အုပ်မိုး၍ ရှိခိုးပူဇော်ဖူးမြော်မာန်လျှော့ ကန်တော့ပါ၏ အရှင်ဘုရား။

ကန်တော့ရသော ကုသိုလ်ကံစေတနာတို့ကြောင့် အပါယ်လေးပါး၊ ကပ်သုံးပါး၊ ရပ်ပြစ်ရှစ်ပါး၊ ရန်သူမျိုးငါးပါး၊ ဝိပတ္တိတရားလေးပါး၊ ဗျသနတရားငါးပါး၊ အနာမျိုးကိုးဆယ့်ခြောက်ပါး၊ မိစ္ဆာဒိဋ္ဌိတရား ခြောက်ဆယ့်နှစ်ပါး တို့မှ အခါခပ်သိမ်းကင်းလွတ် ငြိမ်းသည်ဖြစ်၍ မဂ်တရား ဖိုလ်တရား နိဗ္ဗာန် တရားတော်မြတ်ကိုလျင်မြန်စွာရပါလို၏ အရှင်ဘုရား။

I request! I request! I request!

In order that any action I may have committed against the Three Jewels (including my parents and teachers) either physically, verbally and mentally may be effaced, and in order that I may acquire merit which will bestow upon me longevity, health, freedom from dangers and others; I raise my joined hands in reverence to the forehead and worship, honor, look at, and humbly pay homage to the Three Jewels: the Buddha, the Dhamma, and the Samgha (including my parents and teachers) once, twice, and three times.

As a result of this meritorious act of prostration may I be freed at all times from the woeful realms, the three kinds of catastrophes, the eight kinds of wrong circumstances, the five kinds of enemies, the four kinds of misfortunes, the five kinds of loss, the ninety six kinds of ailments, and the sixty two kinds of wrong views; and quickly attain the Path, the Fruition, and the Noble Dhamma of Nibbāna.

== See also ==
- Three Refuges
- Five Precepts
- Gadaw
- Paritta
- Prostration (Buddhism)
- Buddhism in Myanmar
