= Metta Sutta =

Two Buddhist scriptures in Pali Canon

The Mettā Sutta is the name used for two Buddhist discourses (Pali: sutta) found in the Pali Canon. The one, more often chanted by Theravadin monks, is also referred to as Karaṇīyamettā Sutta after the opening word, Karaṇīyam, "(This is what) should be done." It is found in the Suttanipāta (Sn 1.8) and Khuddakapāṭha (Khp 9). It is ten verses in length and it extols both the virtuous qualities and the meditative development of mettā (Pali), traditionally translated as "loving kindness" or "friendliness". Additionally, Thanissaro Bhikkhu's translation, "goodwill", underscores that the practice is used to develop wishes for unconditional goodwill towards the object of the wish.

The other, also chanted by Theravadin Buddhist monks at times, extols the benefits of the practice of mettā (Pali) and it is found in the Anguttara Nikaya (AN 11.15). is also referred to as Mettānisamsa Sutta. This article will focus on the first version.

== Background ==
In Theravāda Buddhism's Pali Canon, mettā is one of the four "divine abodes" (Pali: brahmavihāra) recommended for cultivating interpersonal harmony and meditative concentration (see, for instance, kammaṭṭhāna). In later canonical works (such as the Cariyāpiṭaka), mettā is one of ten "perfections" (pāramī) that facilitates the attainment of awakening (Bodhi) and is a prerequisite to attaining Buddhahood.

According to post-canonical Sutta Nipāta commentary, the background story for the Mettā Sutta is that a group of monks were frightened by the earth devas in the forest where the Buddha had sent them to meditate. When the monks sought the Buddha's advice in dealing with the situation, the Buddha taught the monks the Mettā Sutta as an antidote to overcome their fear. The monks recited the sutta and radiated loving-kindness. Their good-will placated the earth devas to be at ease and stay quiet as well.

== Contents ==
The Mettā Sutta contains a number of recollections or recitations that promote the development of mettā through virtuous characteristics and meditation.

The discourse identifies fifteen moral qualities and conditions conducive to the development of mettā. These include such qualities as being non-deceptive (uju), sincere (suju), easy to correct (suvaco), gentle (mudu) and without arrogance (anatimānī).

In terms of meditative development, the discourse identifies:

- an intentional wish that facilitates generating mettā (Pali: sukhino vā khemino hontu; English: "May all beings be happy and safe")
- a means for developing meditational objects (a list of various sizes, proximity, etc.) for such a wish
- a metaphor — of a mother's protective love for her only child — for how one should cherish this meditation theme and guard it safely. (Note: this is often - indeed, almost universally - misinterpreted as a prototypical metaphor for the feeling we ought to cultivate toward others; however, this is not its intended meaning, as explained by Thanissaro Bhikkhu in the article "Metta Means Goodwill.")
- a method for radiating mettā outwards in all directions

== Use ==
It is often recited as part of religious services in the Theravāda tradition, but is also popular within the Mahayana tradition.

It has been reported that Buddhist monks chanted the Mettā Sutta as part of their demonstration in September and October 2007 against the military in Burma.

== See also ==
- Brahmavihāra - four "divine abodes" identified by the Buddha, including metta.
- Pāramī - in Theravada Buddhism, mettā is one of noble character qualities generally associated with Enlightened beings.
- Paritta - Traditional Buddhist "protective scriptures", including this sutta.

== Sources ==
- Bodhi, Bhikkhu (2005a). In the Buddha's Words: An Anthology of Discourses from the Pali Canon. Somerville, MA: Wisdom Publications. ISBN 0-86171-491-1.
- Bodhi, Bhikkhu (April 9, 2005b). "Sn 1.8 Mettā Sutta — Loving-kindness [part 1]" (lecture). Retrieved from "Bodhi Monastery" at (mp3).
- Bodhi, Bhikkhu (April 23, 2005c). "Sn 1.8 Mettā Sutta — Loving-kindness (part 2)" (lecture). Retrieved from "Bodhi Monastery" at (mp3).
- Gethin, Rupert (1998). The Foundations of Buddhism. Oxford: Oxford University Press. ISBN 0-19-289223-1.
- Gunaratana, Henepola (2007). "2007 Brahmavihara Retreat: The Karaniyametta Sutta, Introduction and Stanza One" (lecture). Retrieved from "Bhavana Society" at (mp3).
- Harvey, Peter (2007). An Introduction to Buddhism: Teachings, History and Practices. Cambridge: Cambridge University Press. ISBN 0-521-31333-3.
- Kamalashila (1996). Meditation: The Buddhist Art of Tranquility and Insight. Birmingham: Windhorse Publications. ISBN 1-899579-05-2. Retrieveable from the author's personal web site at
- Ñāṇamoli, Bhikkhu (trans.) & Bhikkhu Bodhi (ed.) (2001). The Middle-Length Discourses of the Buddha: A Translation of the Majjhima Nikāya. Boston: Wisdom Publications. ISBN 0-86171-072-X.
- Piyadassi Thera (ed., trans.) (1999). The Book of Protection: Paritta. Kandy: Buddhist Publication Society. Retrieved 08-14-2008 from "Access to Insight" at
- Rhys Davids, T.W. & William Stede (eds.) (1921-5). The Pali Text Society’s Pali–English Dictionary. Chipstead: Pali Text Society. Retrieved 2008-08-22 from "U. Chicago" at
- Salzberg, Sharon (1995). Lovingkindness: The Revolutionary Art of Happiness. Boston: Shambhala Publications. ISBN 1-57062-176-4.
- Walshe, Maurice (1995). The Long Discourses of the Buddha: A Translation of the Dīgha Nikāya. Somerville, MA: Wisdom Publications. ISBN 0-86171-103-3.
- Warder, A.K. (1970; reprinted 2004). Indian Buddhism. Motilal Banarsidass: Delhi. ISBN 81-208-1741-9.
