= Buddhist music =

Music genre

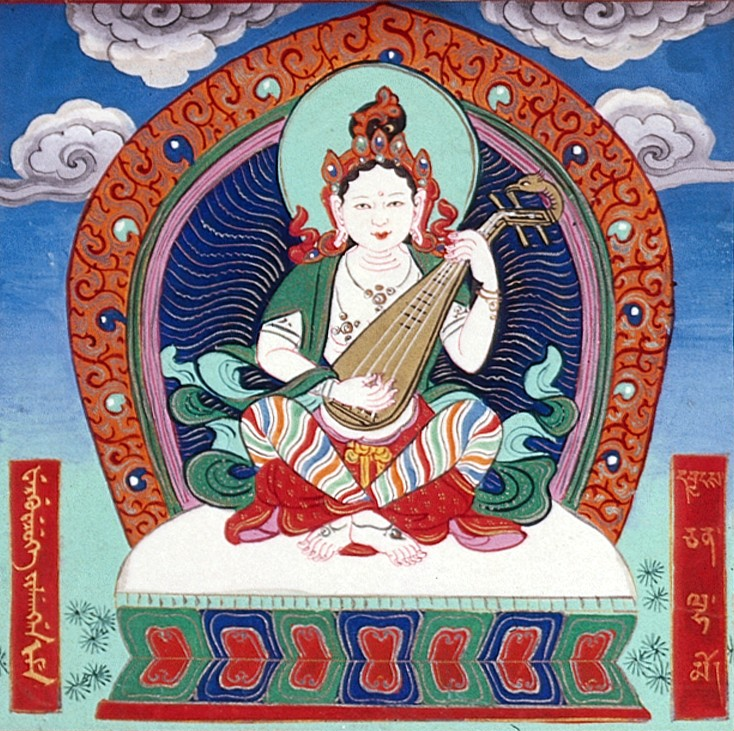
Tibetan illustration of Saraswati holding a veena, the main deity of music and musicians in Mahayana Buddhism

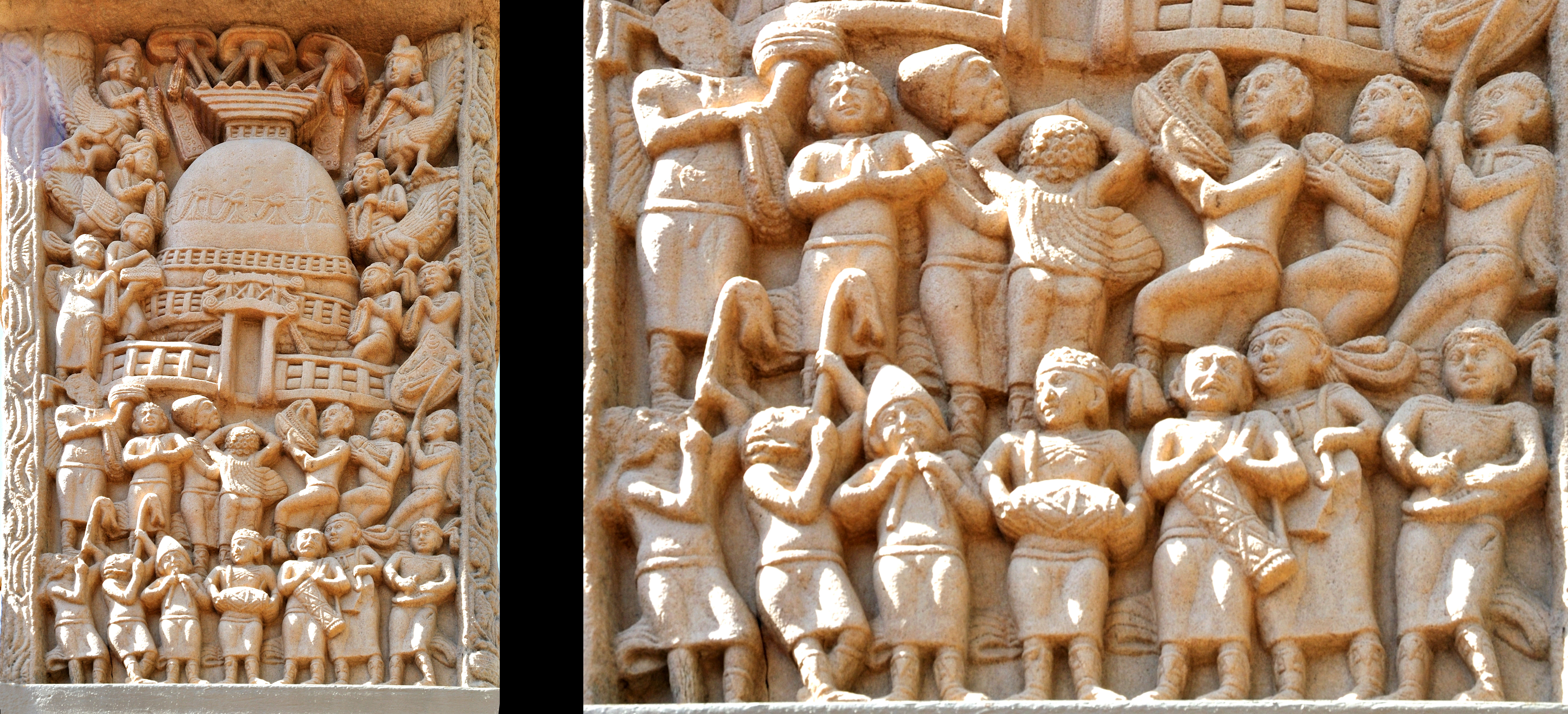
Relief of musicians from Sanchi

Buddhist music is music (Sanskrit: vàdita, saṅgīta) created for or inspired by Buddhism and includes numerous ritual and non-ritual musical forms. As a Buddhist art form, music has been used by Buddhists since the time of early Buddhism, as attested by artistic depictions in Indian sites like Sanchi. While certain early Buddhist sources contain negative attitudes to music, Mahayana sources tend to be much more positive to music, seeing it as a suitable offering to the Buddhas and as a skillful means to bring sentient beings to Buddhism.

Buddhist music retains a prominent place in many Buddhist traditions, and is usually used for ceremonial and devotional purposes. Buddhist music and chanting is often part of Buddhist rituals and festivals in which they may be seen as offerings to the Buddha.

Most Buddhist music includes chanting or singing, accompanied by instruments. The chanting is often of traditional texts which include: sutras, mantras, dharani, parittas, or verse compositions (such as gathas, stotras, and caryagitis). Buddhist instrumental music does exist, though it is less commonly heard in temples.

Examples of Buddhist musical traditions include the Chinese Buddhist fanbai, Newari Buddhist Gunlā Bājan, Tibetan Buddhist music, Japanese Buddhist shōmyō, modern Indian Buddhist bhajans, and Cambodian Smot chanting. As there are many different traditions of Buddhist music and chanting, the musical instruments used vary widely, from solely relying on the human voice, to many types of classic instruments used in Asian music (such as the ancient Indian veena) as well as modern instruments (keyboards, guitars, etc.).

In the modern academy, the study of Buddhist music, sometimes known as Buddhist musicology, has become its own field of academic research.

== In doctrine and scriptures ==
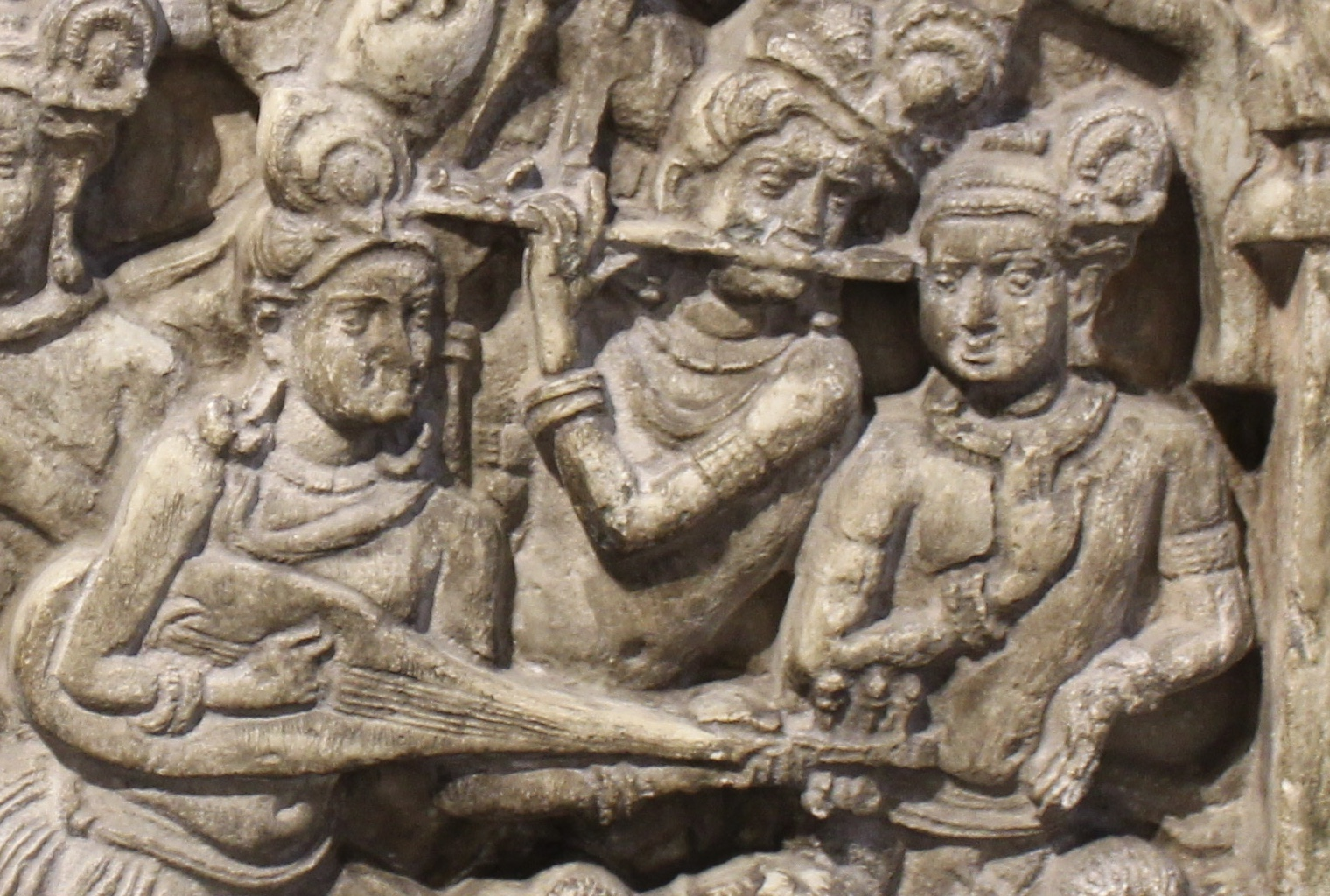
A musical ensemble with flute and an ancient Indian vina, from Amaravati

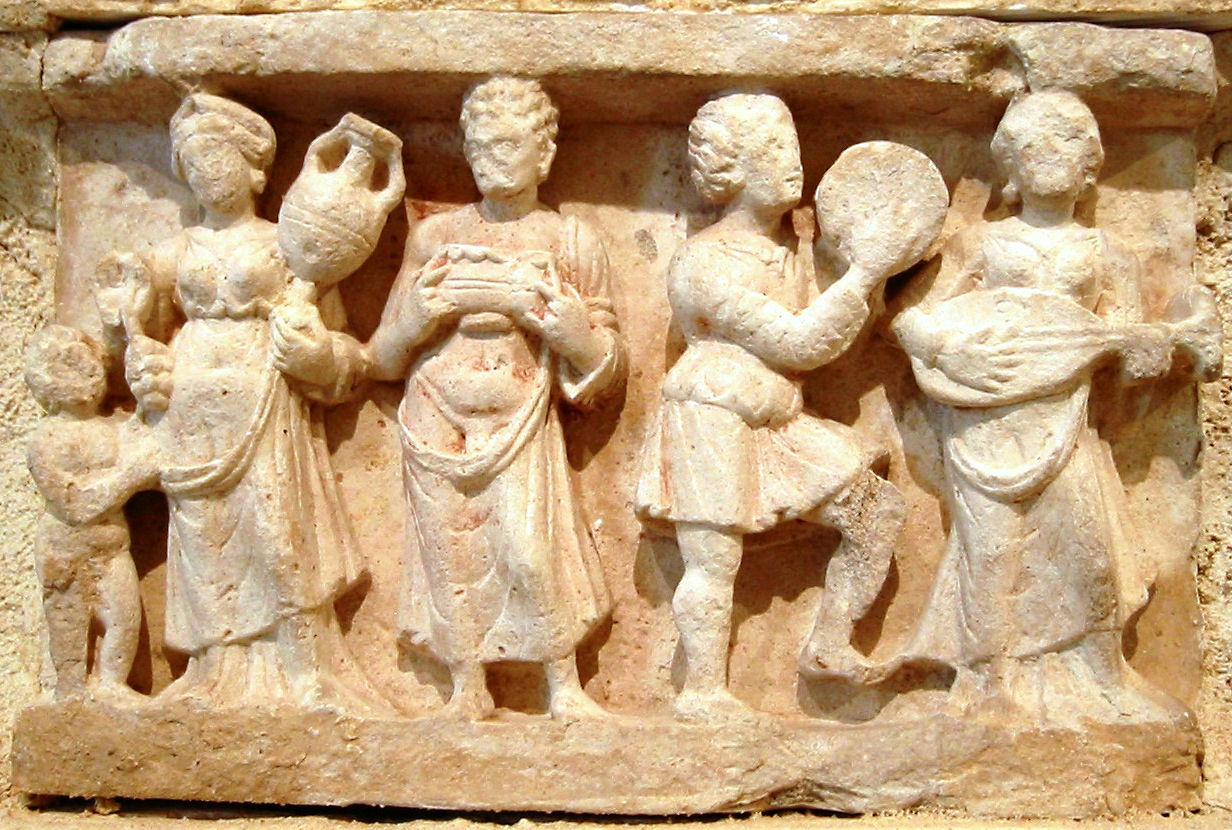
A relief depicting musicians at Chakhil-i-Ghoundi Stupa, Hadda, Afghanistan, 1st–2nd century CE

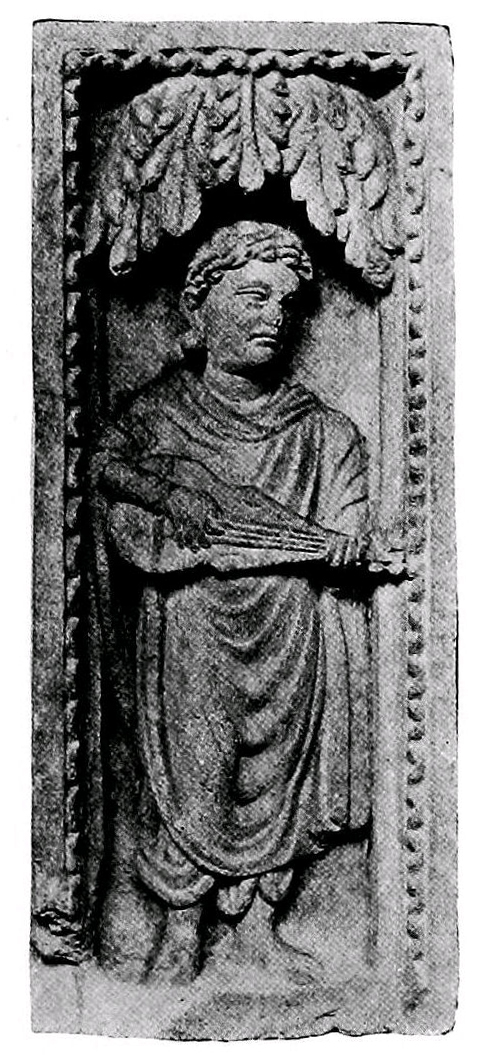
A man playing a stringed instrument (possibly a type of veena), Yusufzai district (near Peshawar), Gandhara. An example of Greco-Buddhist art.

In Buddhism, chanting is a traditional Buddhist devotional practice, as well as a means of enhancing and preparing the mind for silent meditation. It is a common part of formal group practice, in either a lay or monastic context. Some forms of Buddhism also use chanting for ritualistic, apotropaic or other magical purposes.

In Mahayana Buddhism, the offering of music is a traditional part of devotional offerings to the Buddhas (others include water, flowers, and light). The offering of music is thus considered to bring good merit. The idea of music as an offering to the Buddhas can be found in various Mahayana sutras. Common instruments included the veena, drums, and flutes (venu).

Furthermore, in some Mahayana sources, Buddhist music is considered to be a skillful means (upaya), a way to guide people to the Buddhist path and to teach them the Buddha's teachings. Some Mahayana sutras also depict the Pure Lands as filled with divine music.

=== In the early Buddhist sources ===
Various passages from the early Buddhist texts contain criticisms of musical performance directly from the Buddha. The main criticism is that music leads to sense desire and attachment, and is thus a hindrance to meditative concentration (samadhi), and to peace of mind. However, there are other passages in which the Buddha praises music and chanting.

Aside from textual sources, there are numerous depictions of musicians and musical instruments at ancient Indian Buddhist sites like Sanchi, and Amaravati, as well as at various Greco-Buddhist sites in Buddhist Gandhara, such as Chakhil-i-Ghoundi.

==== Against music ====
In the Ghitassara Sutta (Anguttara Nikaya 5.209), the Buddha admonishes Buddhist monks for reciting the teaching (Dhamma) in a musical way:

Monks, there are five dangers of reciting the Dhamma with a musical intonation. What five? Oneself gets attached to the sound, others get attached to the sound, householders are annoyed, saying, "Just as we sing, these sons of the Sakyan sing", the concentration of those who do not like the sound is destroyed, and later generations copy it. These, monks, are the five dangers of reciting the Dhamma with a musical intonation.

Meanwhile, in the Sigalovada Sutta, a sutta addressed to laypersons, music is included as a negative sense desire:

There are these six drawbacks of frequenting festivals. You're always thinking: 'Where's the dancing? Where's the singing? Where's the music? Where are the stories? Where's the applause? Where are the kettledrums?'

Early Buddhist sources include the practice of uposatha, in which laypersons observe a set of eight precepts. The seventh of these states one should abstain from wordly entertainments, shows and music. The Uposatha Sutta asks Buddhists to reflect how noble disciples "have given up singing and dancing, the playing of musical instruments and the watching of entertainments, which are stumbling blocks to that which is wholesome."

The canonical Buddhist Vinayas (monastic codes) generally reject the use of musical chanting and singing for reciting the Buddhist scriptures, since it was seen as a sensuous distraction. They are prohibit monks and nuns from listening to or performing music since it is connected with sensual pleasure.

==== Positive passages ====
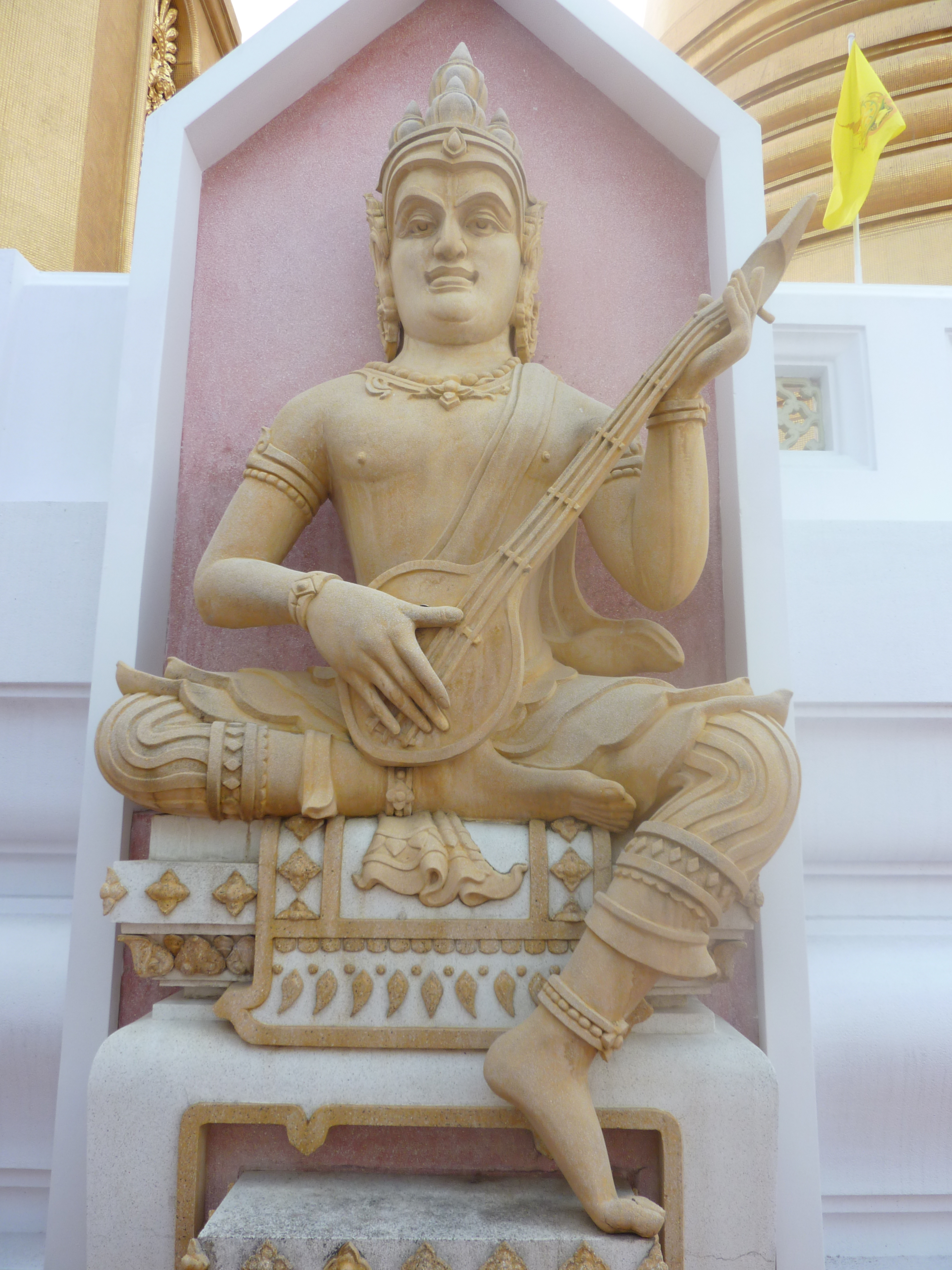
A Thai sculpture of Dhatarattha (Dhṛtarāṣṭra), the leader of the musical gandharvas and one of the Four Heavenly Kings (Caturmahārāja), who are important guardian deities in Buddhism

Certain passages in the early Buddhists are much more positive about music. Digha Nikaya sutta no. 21 (Sakka's Questions) and its Chinese parallel at DA 14, contains a passage in which a gandharva (a celestial musician) named Pañcaśikha sings some verses to the Buddha accompanied by a lute, and the Buddha approves of it. In the Dirgha Agama version, the Buddha listens and praises Pañcaśikha saying:

Good, Pañcaśikha, good! You're able to praise the Tathāgata with your clear voice and harmonious cymophane lute. The sound of both your lute and voice are neither long or short. Their compassion and gracefulness moves people's hearts. Your song is replete with many meanings and explains the bonds of desire, the religious life, the ascetic, and Nirvāṇa!

The Mahaparinibbana sutta states that before the death of the Buddha, "heavenly music played in the sky in honor of the Realized One. And heavenly choirs sang in the sky in honor of the Realized One." After the Buddha's death, laypeople venerated the Buddha "with dance and song and music and garlands and fragrances". In the Chinese version of the Mahaparanirvana sutra, the Buddha approves of devotional practices through music when he states "there are four kinds of people in the world who should be memorialized by building a shrine and providing incense, flowers, silk canopies, and music there". These four types of people are said to be: tathāgatas (Buddhas), pratyekabuddhas, sravakas (disciples) and noble wheel-turning kings.

The Mahāli Sutta (DN 6) mentions that through a certain samadhi, one may hear heavenly sounds from the deva realms.

Other sources, like the Jatakas, and Avadanas, contain various stories which depict music in a positive light. For example, in one story, a bird named Cittapatta sang songs to the past Buddha Vipassī, and he eventually gained a good rebirth and became a god, and then an arahant. Another story about a bird singing to a Buddha is found in the Theragāthā commentary (aṭṭhakathā), this time, the past Buddha Krakucchanda is featured. Similarly, when Sikhī Buddha died, a tree dwelling spirit offered flowers and instrumental music, and this contributed to his future nirvana (Therapadana 118).

=== In later sources ===
One Indian Buddhist figure who was well known as a musician was the 2nd century poet Aśvaghoṣa. Both Tibetan (Taranatha) and Chinese sources mention that he was also a great musician and traveled with a choir. Xuanzang (7th century) mentions that when he traveled to India, the music of Aśvaghoṣa was still remembered as having the power to impress upon people the truth of impermanence.

One of his musical hymns, the Gaṇḍīstotragāthā (Chinese: Kien-ch'ui-fan-tsan, Hymn on the Bell), has survived in Chinese transliteration and Tibetan translation (which also include some musical notation). Musical references are also quite common in the Buddhacarita, which indicates the author was knowledgeable about Indian music, its styles, instruments, notes, and so forth.

According to the Theravada commentary to the Long Discourses, the Dīgha-nikāya-aṭṭhakathā (Sumaṅgalavilāsinī), king Aśoka's consort Asandhimittā attained stream entry when she listened to a kalavīka bird's song and imagined that it was the sweet voice of the Buddha (DA ii.453). One Theravada commentary on the Subhāsita Sutta (Sn 3.3) contains a story about sixty monks who attained arahantship in Sri Lanka after hearing a slave woman sing a song about birth, old age, and death. According to the Theravada commentator Buddhaghosa, adapting songs to the Dhamma is proper. His Vinaya Commentary also mentions certain 'songs of sacred festivals' (sādhukīḷitagītaṃ) which sing of the qualities of the Three Jewels (Vinaya Commentary iv.925).

In the Theravada tradition, chanting of certain texts called parittas are considered to have the power to "avert illness or danger, to ward off the influence of malignant beings, to obtain protection and deliverance from evil, and to promote health, prosperity, welfare, and well-being." There are several reasons that chanting these texts have power. Firstly, they are considered to be an "act of truth" (saccakiriya). According to this theory, words which speak of the truth of the Dharma are considered to have magical power. Furthermore, parittas are also connected with morality (sila) and kindness (metta) and the very sound of their chanting is said to calm the mind.

=== In Mahayana sources ===
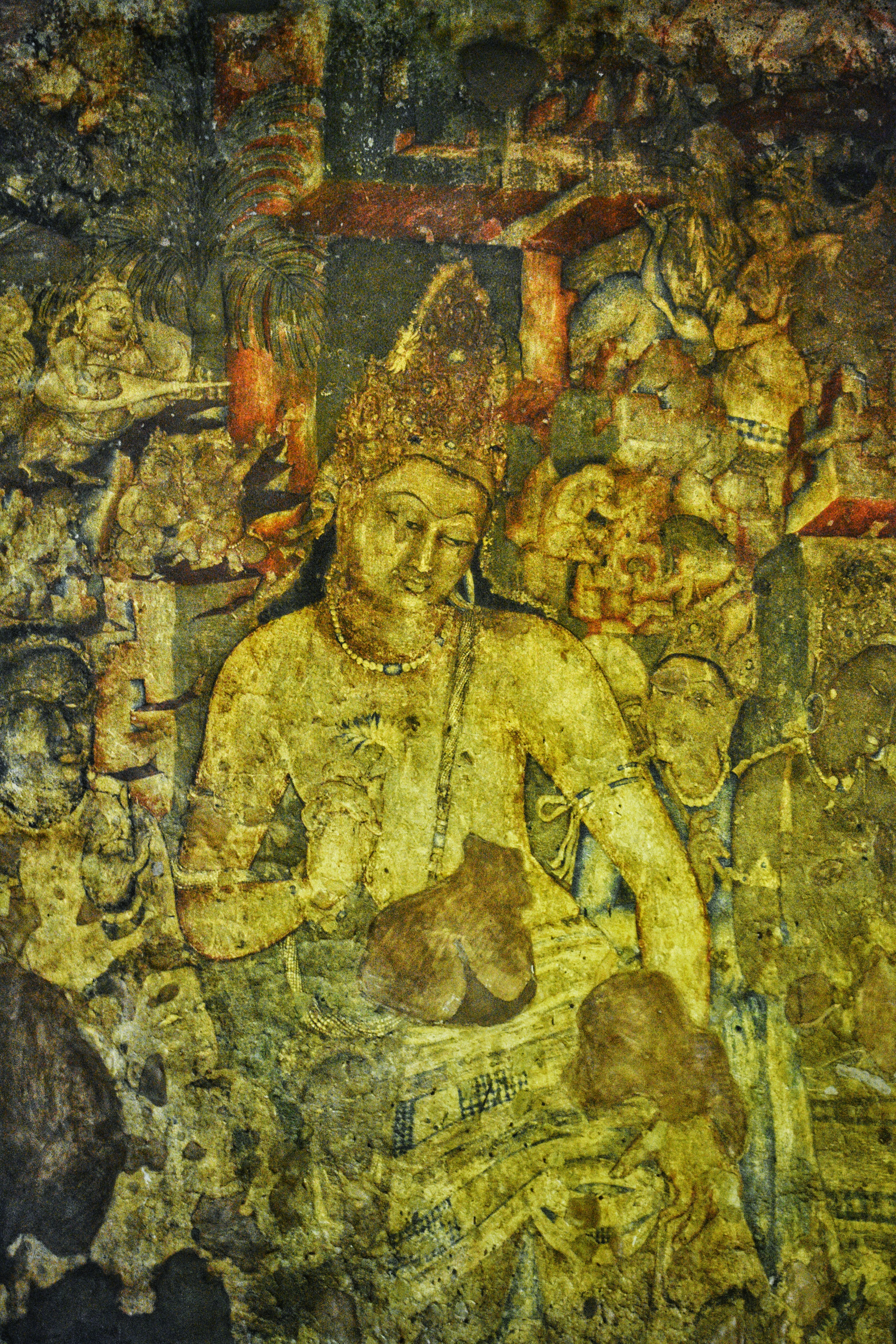
Painting from Ajanta Caves, depicting the bodhisattva Padmapani surrounded by celestial musicians

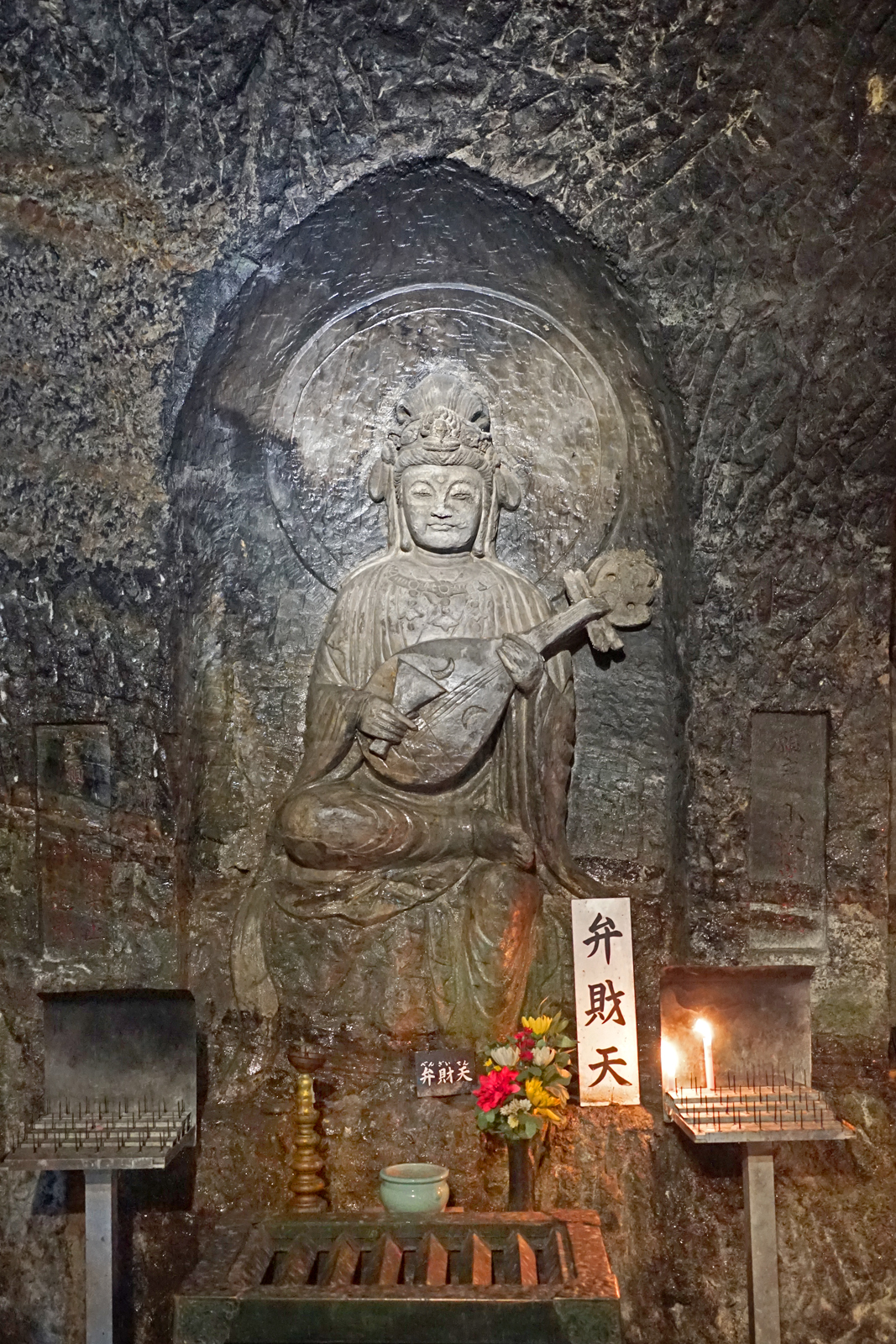
A sculpture of Benzaiten (Saraswati), goddess of music and art, Hase-dera Temple, Kamakura, Japan

Mahayana sutras often contain positive depictions of music, which is often seen as a wholesome offering with which to venerate the Buddhas which can generate merit and prompt the blessings of the Buddhas. In several Mahayana sutras, music is found as a common offering given by humans or devas to the Buddha. Examples can be found in the Lotus Sutra and the Lankavatara Sutra. In the Lotus Sutra, music is found in various parts of the text as a common offering to the Buddha (along with other offerings such as flowers and incense). One example from chapter three states:

Śakra, the lord of devas, and Brahma, together with innumerable deva-putras also made offerings to the Buddha of their heavenly beautiful garments, heavenly māndārava flowers, and great māndārava flowers. Their heavenly garments floated and fluttered in the air, while in the sky the devas played hundreds of thousands of myriads of kinds of music together at one time.

Furthermore, Lotus sutra chapter two states:

If someone employs persons to play music, striking drums or blowing horns or conch shells, playing pipes, flutes, zithers, harps, balloon guitars, cymbals and gongs, and if these many kinds of wonderful notes are intended wholly as an offering; or if one with a joyful mind sings a song in praise of the Buddha's virtue, even if it is just one small note, then all who do these things have attained the Buddha way.

Chapter twenty four of the Lotus Sutra is named after a musical bodhisattva named Gadgadasvara (Wonderful Voice). This bodhisattva travels to our world and beautiful musical sounds follow him everywhere. The Buddha then explains that this bodhisattva "paid homage to the Buddha Meghadundubhisvararāja with a hundred thousand kinds of music and eighty-four thousand seven-jeweled bowls" for twelve thousand years. It is said that because of the roots of merit cultivated by this devotional practice, he attained rebirth in another Buddha's pure land and gained transcendent powers. In later sources, the bodhisattva Wonderful Voice (Jp. Myōon) became identified with Saraswati / Benzaiten.

The Lankavatara sutra also contains examples of using music to praise and venerate the Buddha. In the first chapter, Ravana and his attendants first greet Shakyamuni Buddha by singing verses of praise which were "gracefully accompanied by music, a lute studded with coral and cat's eye, slung at the side by means of priceless perfumed pale cloth and played with a sapphire plectrum, producing a melody ranging through all the notes of the scale." The Longer Sukhāvatīvyūha Sūtra also contains passages in which music is part of a set of devotional offerings for Buddhas and bodhisattvas. In one passage, a group of bodhisattvas is said to "play heavenly music and praise the virtues of the buddhas with hymns accompanied by wonderful sounds".

Apart from presenting music as an offering to the Buddha, some Mahayana sources also depict music as a skillful means employed by the Buddhas to impart the Buddha Dharma in their pure lands. The Golden Light Sutra also describes the bodhisattva-devi Saraswati (Benzaiten) as a goddess of music whose voice can lead beings to salvation. According to Fabio Rambelli, "here, Benzaiten's voice is not an offering, but a tool to induce beings to accept Buddhism."

In the Longer Sukhāvatīvyūha Sūtra, the pure land of Buddha Amitabha (Sukhavati) is filled with magical music which arises from the Bodhi tree of Amitabha, from jeweled trees (ratnavṛkṣa) and from instruments that play by themselves. In the Longer Sukhāvatīvyūha, Amitabha's bodhi tree produces "innumerable exquisite Dharma sounds", "which spread far and wide, pervading all the other buddha lands in the ten directions". The sutra further states:

Those who hear the sounds attain penetrating insight into dharmas and dwell in the stage of non-retrogression. Until they attain buddhahood, their senses of hearing will remain clear and sharp and they will not suffer from any pain or sickness... Again, in that land, there are thousands of varieties of spontaneous music, which are all, without exception, sounds of the Dharma. They are clear and serene, full of depth and resonance, delicate, and harmonious; they are the most excellent sounds in all the worlds of the ten directions.

Furthermore, according to Rambelli, the sutra presents this divine music "not only an adornment of the Pure Land, but a veritable manifestation of the Buddha Amida endowed with the power to lead beings to the Land of Bliss."

==== Philosophy of music in the Sutra of Kinnara King Druma ====
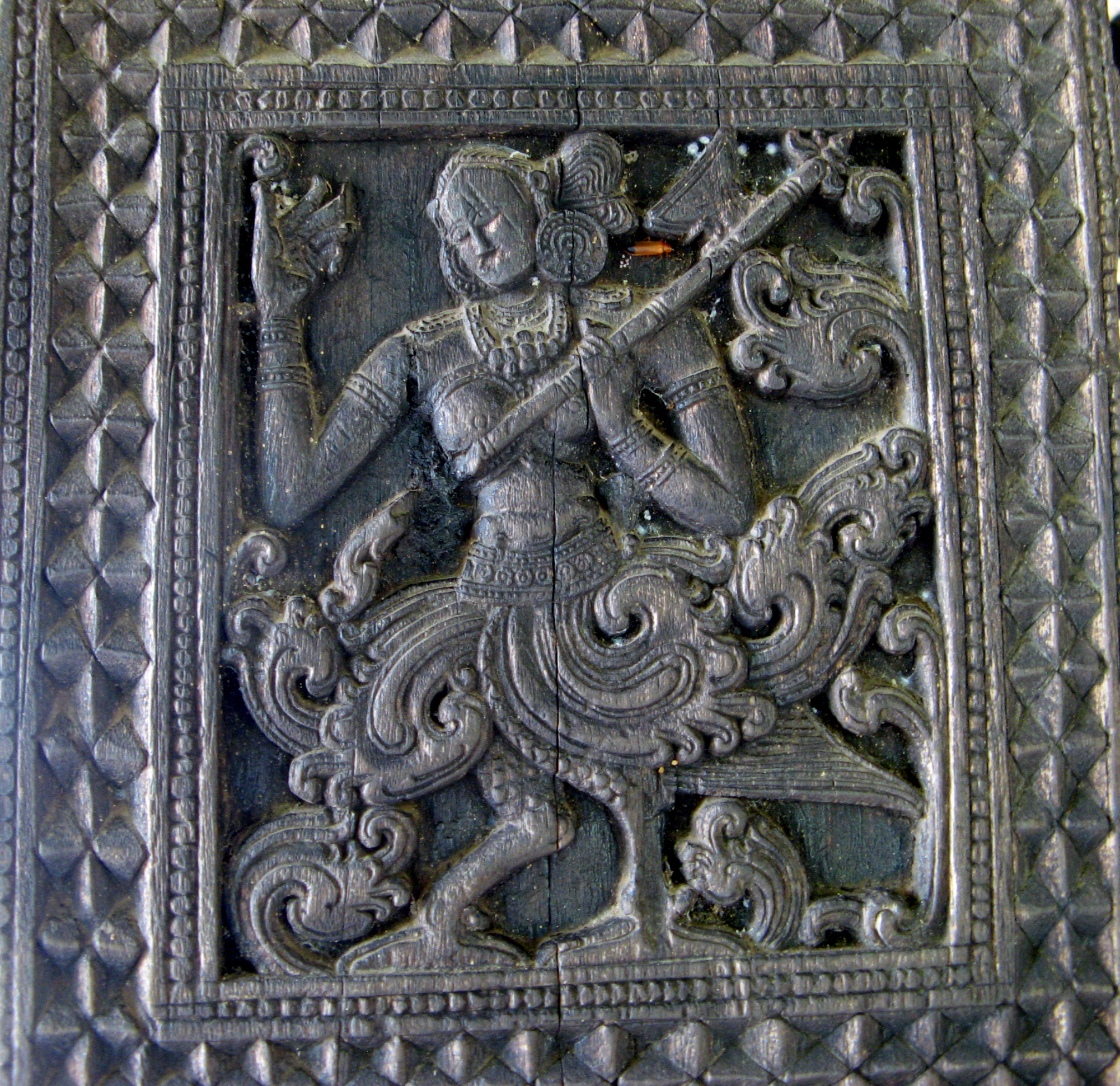
Carving of a kinnari, a heavenly musician, from Embekke Temple, Sri Lanka

Perhaps the most detailed Mahayana philosophy of music is found in the Sutra of the Questions by Druma, King of the Kinnara (*Druma-kiṃnara-rāja-paripṛcchā), which was first translated by Lokakṣema (Taisho no. 624), and then again translated by Kumārajīva in the fifth century (Taisho no. 624).

Various passages in the sutra describe numerous performances of heavenly music, most of them performed by King Druma, the vīnā playing king of the kinnaras (Skt. Kiṃnara), and his retinue of musicians (which include devas, kinnaras and gandharvas). In some passages, the Buddha himself preaches through song. Druma's music is presented as so powerful that it can be heard all over the universe, it drives all the devas in the desire realm to come see the Buddha and makes all those present (except a few high level bodhisattvas), start dancing spontaneously.

Druma also plays a song about emptiness which leads eight thousand bodhisattvas to attain the patience of the non-arising of all dharmas. When asked where this beautiful song came from, Druma explains his philosophy of music, which is encapsulated in the following passage:

All sounds emerge from empty space. Sound has the nature of emptiness: when you finish hearing it, it disappears; after it disappears, it abides in emptiness. Therefore, all dharmas, whether they are taught or not, are emptiness. All dharmas are like sound. If one teaches the dharmas through sound, the dharmas cannot be attained in sound itself. Dharmas themselves cannot be said; what is called speech is only sound. Therefore, sound is originally non-abiding anywhere [i.e., is non-substantial], thus it is not real and solid, and its reality only lies in its name. If so, and paradoxically, its reality is indestructible, has no origin and thus is not subject to extinction, therefore it is pure, immaculate, and incorruptible, like light and the mind; it is all-surpassing and beyond signs – that is, sound is the condition of enlightenment; when a bodhisattva is in that condition, he has attained the endurance of the non-origination of dharmas [...] All discourses are only sound/voice; one produces these sounds simply because one wants to talk about something else than voice. This endurance of the non-origination of dharmas cannot be explained nor heard. Why? Because its meaning is unattainable, that is, absent.

According to Rambelli, the gist of this passage is that all Buddhist sutras, teachings and also music "are simply voiced sounds or signifiers; their signifieds are not inherent in those sounds and are nowhere to be found (they are unattainable)...In more technical terms, music, like language, is not a symbol of anything (meaning is ontologically distinct and separate from sound); rather, music is both an index and an icon (a faithful reproduction) of emptiness – in other words, music is a concrete example, in our experiential field, of emptiness." Rambelli also notes that Druma's instrument, the veena, is made of beryl (vaiḍūrya), which is a transparent light green stone. Transparency is also a metaphor for emptiness in Indian sources. Hence, Druma is singing about emptiness with an instrument that also symbolizes emptiness.

The Buddha confirms that Druma is highly advanced in his use of music as a skillful means and that through music he can lead countless beings to omniscience. At another part of the sutra, the Buddha manifests seven giant trees which emit light and music all over the universe and then himself produces a song accompanied by music which clarifies all the doubts of the bodhisattvas. The Buddha also explains to the kinnaras that they do not need to abandon their musical arts to practice the path, because their musical sounds protect the Dharma.

According to Rambelli, this sutra was influential in Japanese Buddhism, where it was used to defend the activities of Buddhist musicians and performing artists not just as an offering, but as a kind of self-cultivation.

=== In Vajrayana Buddhism ===
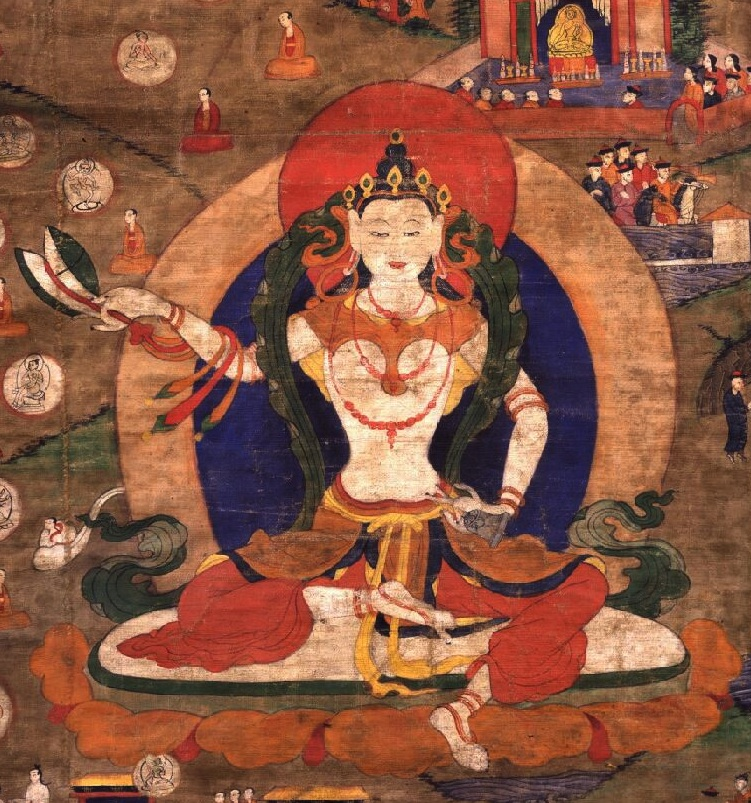
Machig Labdrön with hand-drum (damaru) and hand-bell (dril-bu)

The Indian Buddhist tantric literature includes music, song and dance as common ritual offerings to tantric deities.

The use of singing and dancing as a spiritual practice is promoted in various Buddhist tantras, for example, singing and dancing is an important practice in the Hevajra Tantra, which states:

If songs are sung from bliss, they are supreme vajra-songs. When bliss arises, dance for the sake of liberation, dancing the adamantine postures with full awareness...The songs are mantra and the dance is meditation; therefore a practitioner of yoga must ever always sing and dance.

The Hevajra Tantra further states that this is to be performed "with mindfulness, distracted, meditating with impassioned mind, in a state of unwavering awareness." Similarly, the Sarvabuddhasamāyoga Tantra (Union of all the Buddhas Tantra) states:

The excellent song of the manifestations of the Buddha, for those knowing these mudras, is the excellent cause of perfection, accomplishes all the esoteric acts, continually brings all the physical necessities, and thus all the forms of increase of goods. So, having sun the songs with six varieties of tunes, sing the divinity's song.

An inscription from Gaya also shows that during the Tantric age, sophisticated styles of song and dance offerings were made in Buddhist temples with the support of Indian royalty.

Indian Buddhist mahasiddhas and yogis were known to sing tantric songs, variously called Dohā, Vajragīti, and Caryāgīti. Indian Vajrayana sources state that these songs, along with music and dance, were part of tantric Buddhist feasts (ganachakras, esoteric gatherings and celebrations). These Carya songs contained esoteric instructions on the Vajrayana Buddhist view and practice. Many esoteric references were communicated through coded language. Many of these songs survive in Tibetan translation. One collection by Viraprakasa has songs from the eighty four mahasiddhas, and is known as Vajra Songs: The Heart Realizations of the Eighty-four Mahasiddhas. A similar genre of tantric Buddhist songs have survived in the proto-Bengali–Assamese Charyapadas.

One famous tantric Buddhist musician was the Mahāsiddha Vīṇāpa (the vina player), one of the 84 mahasiddhas. He was known for using the playing of the vina as a form of spiritual practice (sadhana). According to the Buddhist sources, his guru Buddhapa taught Vinapa to meditate as follows: "meditate upon the sound of your instrument free of all distinction between the sound struck and the mental impression; cease all mental interference with the sound, all conceptualization and all critical and judgemental thought, so that you contemplate only pure sound." After practicing this method for nine years, Vinapa is said to have attained the realization of Mahamudra. In one song by Vinapa, he says "practicing the unborn, unstruck sound, I, Vinapa, lost my self."

Tibetan Buddhists also composed their own prayers and "vajra songs" as well as developing new musical forms, like Tibetan overtone singing ("throat singing"). Some Tibetan Buddhist traditions, like the Chod tradition of Machik Labdrön (1055–1153), still include the singing of songs with instrumental accompaniment as part of their ritual practices. One contemporary figure known for his yogic songs is Khenpo Tsultrim Gyamtso. According to Ari Goldfield and Rose Taylor,

Singing Dharma songs is an extraodinarily skillful and enjoyable Buddhist practice technique that Rinpoche has introduced to his students in a variety of ways: Rinpoche himself sings regularly; he has given illuminating explanations of the profound songs of the great masters; has composed many of his own songs; and has instructed and encouraged students to translate these songs into their own languages and sing them in their own national and cultural melodies.

=== In East Asian Buddhism ===
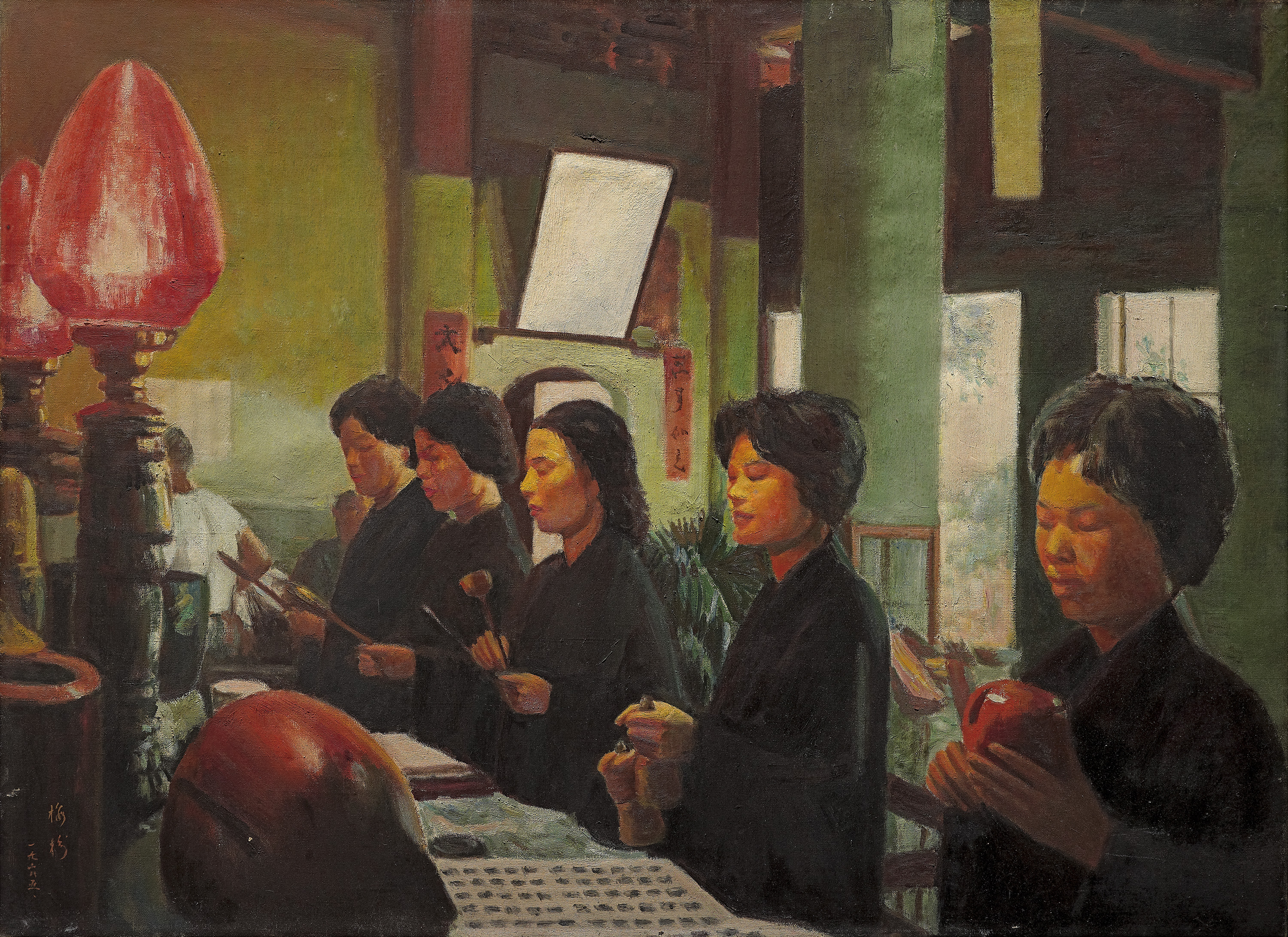
Chanting The Buddhist Scriptures, by Li Mei-shu

Buddhist music is a central feature of East Asian Buddhism, where it is seen as an important offering to the Buddhas, as a skillful means of teaching Buddhism and also as a kind of meditation.

In his Nanhai Ji Gui Zhuan (Commentaries on Dharma from the South Sea), the Chinese Tang dynasty monk Yi Jing (635-713) presented six merits of Buddhist chanting: "1) understanding Buddha's great virtue better; 2) becoming well versed in Buddhist sutras; 3) purifying organ of speech; 4) improving the thoracic cavity; 5) inducing calm and confidence in the multitude; and 6) longevity."

Heng Sure writes that "Buddhist music, like all things Buddhist, aims to nurture both wisdom and blessings"..."when music is used to praise the Triple Jewel and the Bodhisattvas, it creates blessings and merit." He also argues that Buddhist musical chanting (as opposed to mundane music which is often about sensuality and courtship) can aid one in developing the meditative quality of samadhi. Because of this, Buddhist music is seen as exempt from the precept that states monks and nuns must avoid music. Furthermore, Heng Sure also writes that "we can use music to praise the Triple Jewel and the Bodhisattvas; we use it to teach principle, to gather in and harmonize the conscious awareness of an audience, to accompany sutra text, to restate sutra text in verse. In the end as in the beginning, music is magic. Whether one can use it or not depends on your samadhi."

Heng Sure also cites the Shurangama Sutra which states that listening to sounds with the ear is the most effective method for awakening, since "the substance of the teaching resides purely in sound." Thus, also sounds are part of the mundane world, "hearing them clearly and discriminating them accurately remains our best avenue for awakening here in the world. Someone on the Bodhisattva Path stays within the world, and by letting go the habit of loving or hating sounds, cultivates stillness right within the movement of the busy marketplace."

According to John Daido Loori, the Japanese Zen master Dōgen also defended chanting and Zen liturgy as an important practice. According to Dōgen, the sounds and words of the sutras are metaphors which point to the ultimate, but they are also non-dual with ultimate reality itself. The Shobogenzo states, "seeing forms with the whole body-and-mind, hearing sounds with the whole body-and-mind, one understands them intimately". As such, if we practice Buddhist liturgy by chanting and listening with one's "whole body-and-mind", one eliminates the space between the self and the chants. In this way, developing an intimate practice of chanting can be a skillful means to allow the practitioner to transcend all conceptions of self and other and to experience the non-dual ultimate truth.

== Types of Buddhist music ==
Most forms of Buddhist music is vocal music and religious chanting, often accompanied by musical instruments. A Buddhist chant is a form of musical verse or recitation, in some ways analogous to the religious musics and hymns of other faiths.

There are numerous traditions of Buddhist chanting, singing, and music in all three major schools of Buddhism: Theravada, East Asian Buddhism, and Himalayan Vajrayana.

The basis for most Theravada chants is the Pali Canon, though there are traditions which use more recent compositions. The Mahayana and Vajrayana traditions draw from a wider range of sources, like the Mahayana texts, the Buddhist tantric literature and other sources.

=== East Asian Buddhism ===
East Asian Buddhist music is known as fanbai in Chinese and includes numerous genres. Ancient Chinese musical theory held that good music brought harmony to the world and Confucian thinking held that music was useful for self cultivation. In Chinese Buddhism, these positive views of music combined with the Mahayana Buddhist views of music as a meritorious offering and a skillful means.

According to Trân Van Khê, East Asian Buddhist music is mainly ritualistic vocal music, mostly the chanting of traditional dharanis and sutras like the Heart Sutra, Lotus Sutra, or the Amitabha sutras. However, instrumental music is sometimes heard during special ceremonies, such as funerals. Rituals in which Buddhist music may be heard include repentance ceremonies and rites like the Shuilu Fahui and the Yujia Yankou.

Instruments which are found in East Asian Buddhist music include: the pipa, erhu, yangqin, biwa, oboe (ken), transverse flute (sao), mouth organ, ceremonial drums (like the taiko, or the Vietnamese trong nhac), gongs, bells, the Vietnamese bow lute, and the tap pyong so (Korean).

=== Chinese Buddhist music ===
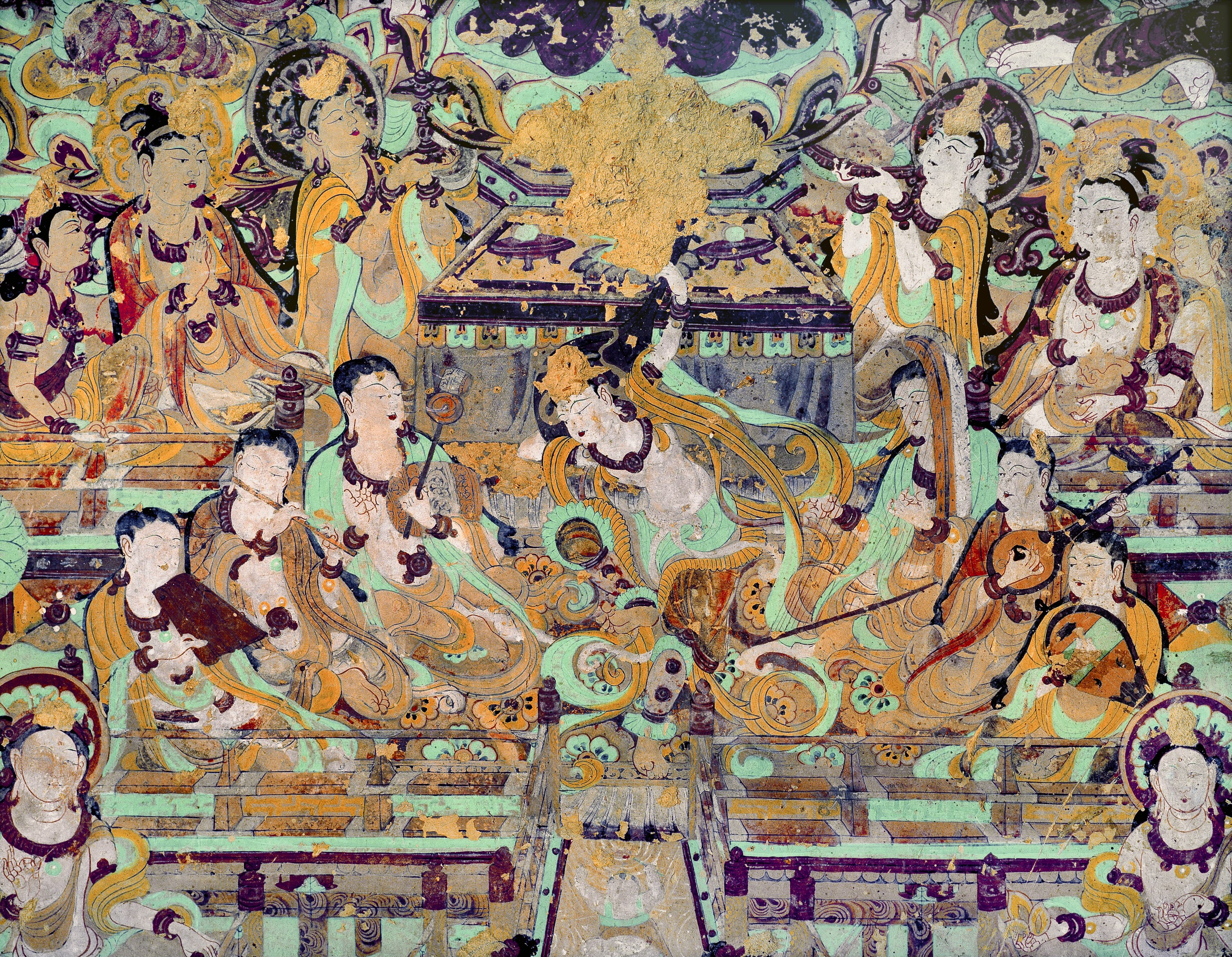
Painting of a Buddhist musical performance Mogao Caves (cave 112), c. mid-Tang dynasty

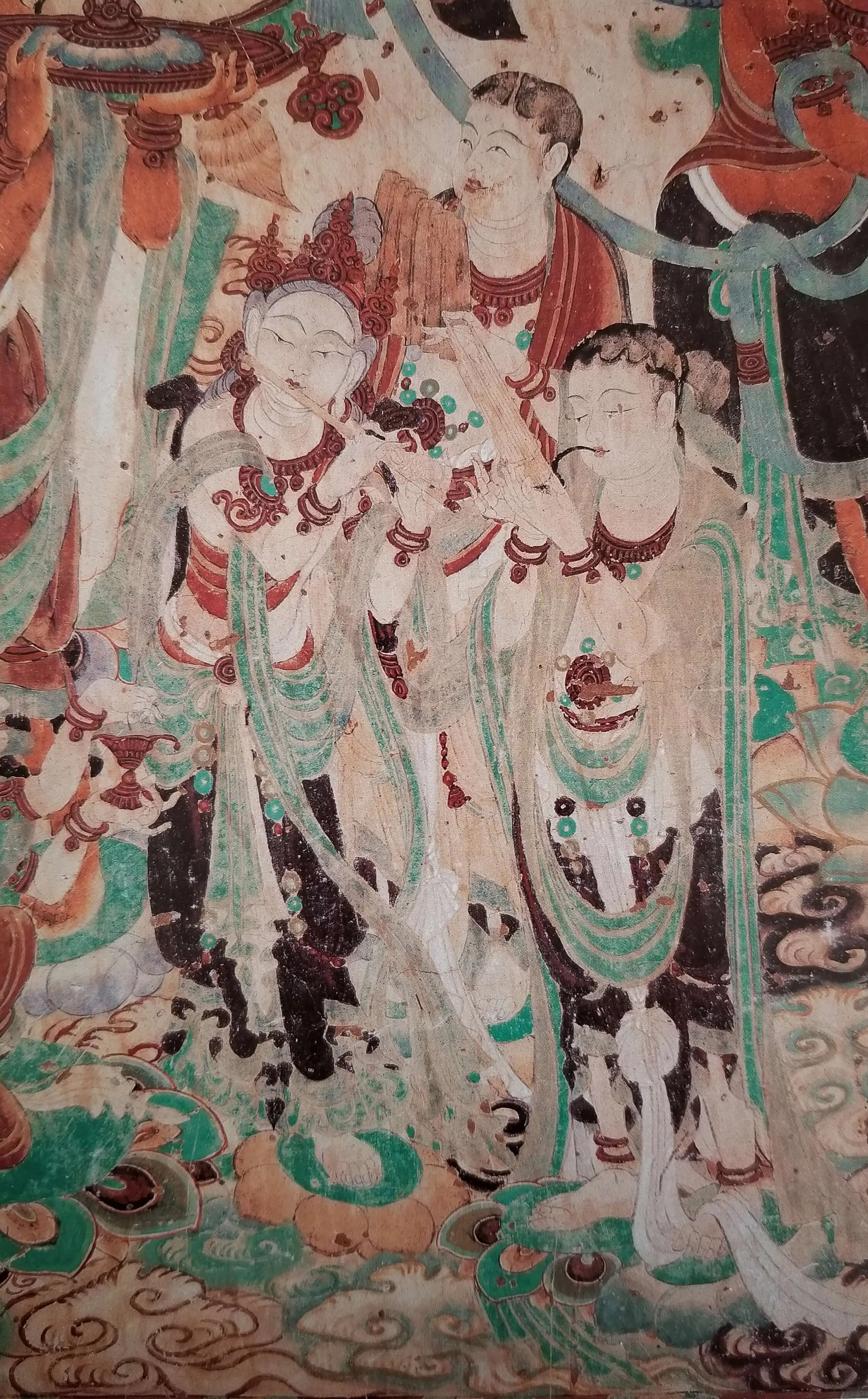
Painting from the Mogao Caves (cave 159)

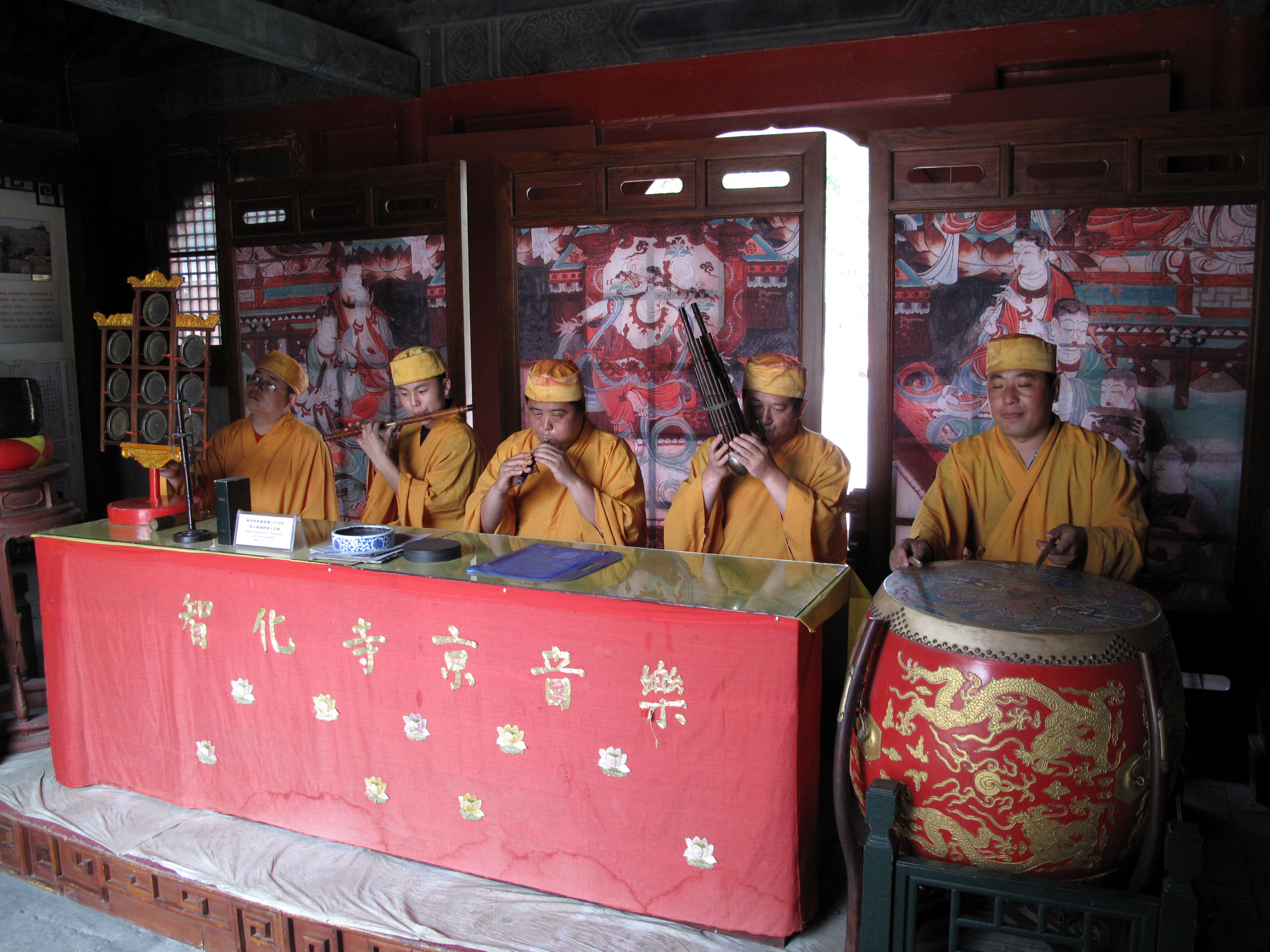
A Chinese Buddhist musical ensemble from Zhihua Temple

Chinese Buddhist chanting is known as fanbai, which means "Voice of Brahma". This style of chanting is typically performed during ritual contexts such as daily liturgical services or ceremonies such as the Shuilu Fahui ceremony and the Dabei Chan. Since the melodies and tunes used for this style of recitation tends to be passed on through oral tradition, various regional variations of fanbai exists in different parts of China. One example is Shangjiang-style of fanbai (上江腔梵唄) in the southwest, which is still preserved at Wenshu Temple in Chengdu and Huayan Temple in Chongqing. Another example is Taiwan, where two main sub-traditions of fanbai exists: "Gushan style" (鼓山調, lit: "Mount Gu") and "Haichaoyin style" (海潮音, lit: "Sound of ocean waves"). Traditional Chinese musical instruments are also frequently employed as accompaniment, such as the gong, the muyu (木魚, wooden fish), the qing (磬, sounding stones), the gu (鼓, drums), zhong (鐘, bells) and chazi (镲仔, cymbals).

The first Chinese Buddhist music appeared in the Three Kingdoms period and consisted of sutra recitation (zhuandu) and fanbai which drew on Buddhist stories from the scriptures and were set to Chinese music. The first well known figure to promote Buddhist music in China was the translator Zhi Qian, who complied Sung Chants for Sakra Accompanied by Qin Music (Dishi yuerenban zheqin gebai). Most of this early Buddhist music were solemn chants and had no instrumental accompaniment.

Buddhist music was developed and promoted by Emperor Wu of Liang, who himself composed pieces of Buddhist music, introduced the genre to his court and promoted large scale Dharma assemblies which included music and chanting. During the Six Dynasties period, Buddhist music flourished. The Tale of the Luoyang Temple describes the Jingle Temple at Luoyang thus: "even in the six cloisters, female musicians were installed. Their singing echoed around the rafters. The sleeves of the dancers gently fluttered. The music of zithers and flutes resounded loud and clear, enchanting the hearers. When the temple's thousand images of Buddha were paraded through the streets clouds of incense hung like a dense fog, the sacred music shook Heaven and Earth, the players ranced and danced, all was a festival."

Buddhist music rose to further prominence in Buddhist temples during the Sui and Tang dynasties when it became widely influential on Chinese culture. This flowering of Buddhist music led to the development of new genres like shuochang storytelling and bianwen storytelling.

There were three main forms of Tang Buddhist music: hymns recited in temples for ritual services, proselytizing music used in popular preaching to laypeople (sujiang) and popular Buddhist songs (foqu) used in celebrations and temple activities.

Popular forms of Buddhist music were influenced by Central Asian music of the Western Regions and also drew on local Chinese folk and popular music traditions. Buddhist music played a key role in Chinese Buddhist efforts to proselytize to laypersons. Popular preaching (sujiang) drew on local folk culture, stories, and music and this genre became very popular among the masses. Soon specialized venues called bianchang developed as well as troupes of performers (yinsheng) who specialized in popular Buddhist music. Temples often had their own yinsheng groups and even the imperial court had their own groups of Buddhist musicians. These court Buddhist musicians famously took part in a very large ceremony during the funeral of Xuanzang.

Popular Tang Buddhist songs (foqu) which were used for worship and for large celebrations are recorded in various sources including Record of the Jiegu, the Tang Huiyao and Cheng Yang's Yue-shu and include titles such as Maitreya Foqu (Mile Foqu), Suryaprabha Foqu (Riguang Foqu) and Tathagata Foqu (Rulai Foqu). These songs remained influential into the Song dynasty period.

Subsequent dynasties from the Song through to the Qing saw the further popularization of fanbai and Buddhist music, which were highly influential on secular musical styles of the times, inspiring developments and innovations in styles of musical composition such as the cipai and the qupai.

Fanbai and Buddhist music remain an important part of the practice of contemporary Chinese Mahayana Buddhism. The American Buddhist monk Heng Sure describes the modern practice of chanting in Chinese Buddhist monasteries as follows:

Buddhist monasteries are musical environments. These new monks and nuns in the Mahayana tradition would on that day and every day, spend a minimum of two and a half hours in the Buddha Hall chanting, and on holidays or sessions, the ceremonies can last for twelve hours, sometimes for twenty-one days. The regular liturgical chanting starts at 4:00 AM with half an hour of mantras and Dharanis, then includes chanting of sutras, praises, Buddha's names, invocations, repentances, dedications, blessings, and protection verses. The tunes and music modes are in some cases 1400 years old. They are healing, and when sung with a sincere heart, have the power to bring the mind to single-pointed clarity and stillness.

=== Korean Buddhist music ===
Korean Buddhist musical chanting is called pomp'ae (Beompae). There are two main styles chissori (grand elaborated style) and the hossori (simple style). The chanted text may be in Chinese, Sanskrit or in Korean, depending on the style.

Korean musical chanting which is accompanied by dance is called chak pop. There are three types: na bi ch'um, the dance of the butterflies; para ch'um, the dance of the cymbals; and pop go ch'um, the ceremonial drum dance.

Furthermore, some forms of instrumental music are inspired by Buddhism, including the famous Yongsan hoe sang.

=== Japanese traditions ===
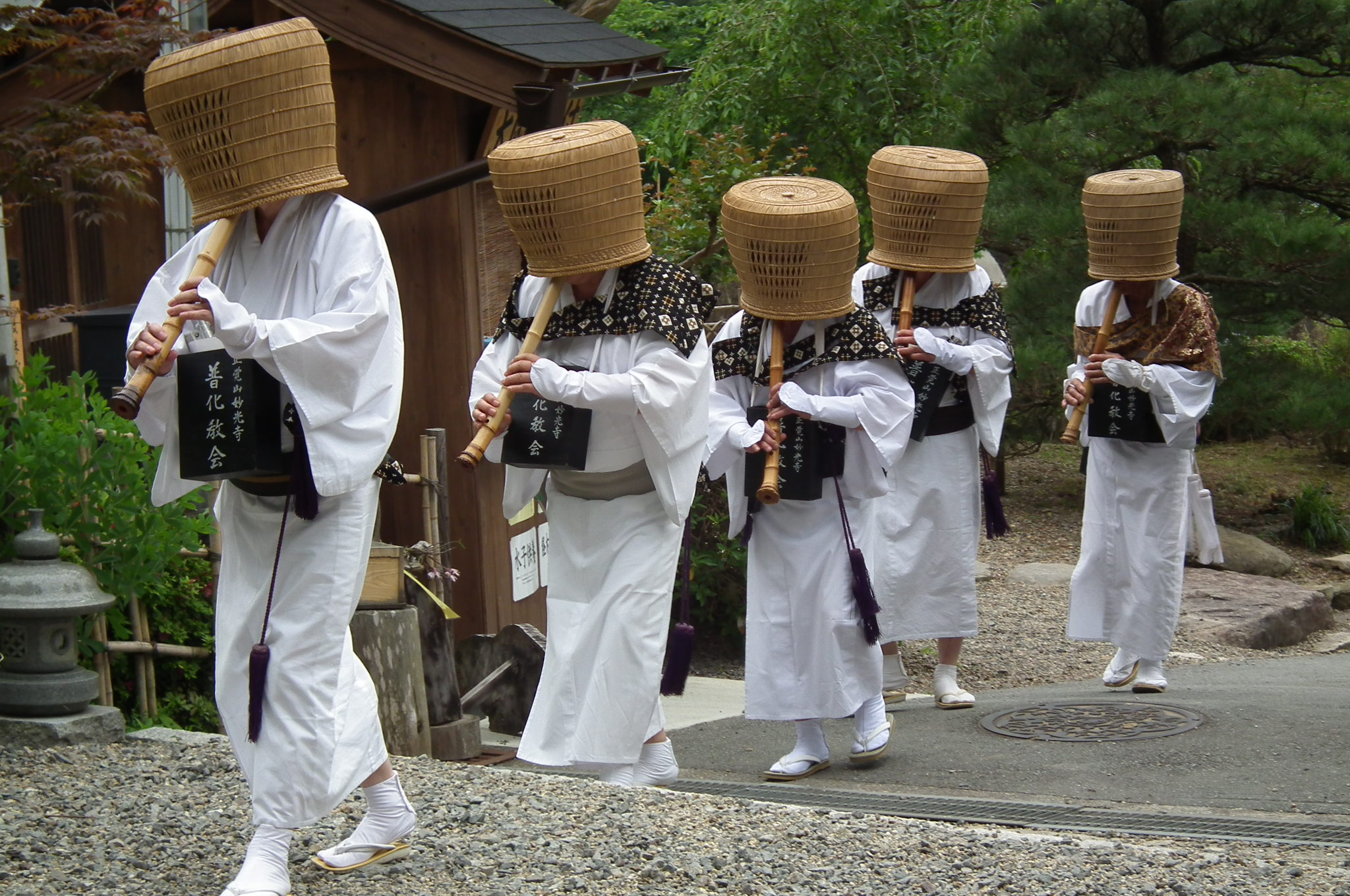
Komusō monks who are known for their practice of suizen ("blowing zen") and their Honkyoku (本曲), pieces of shakuhachi music

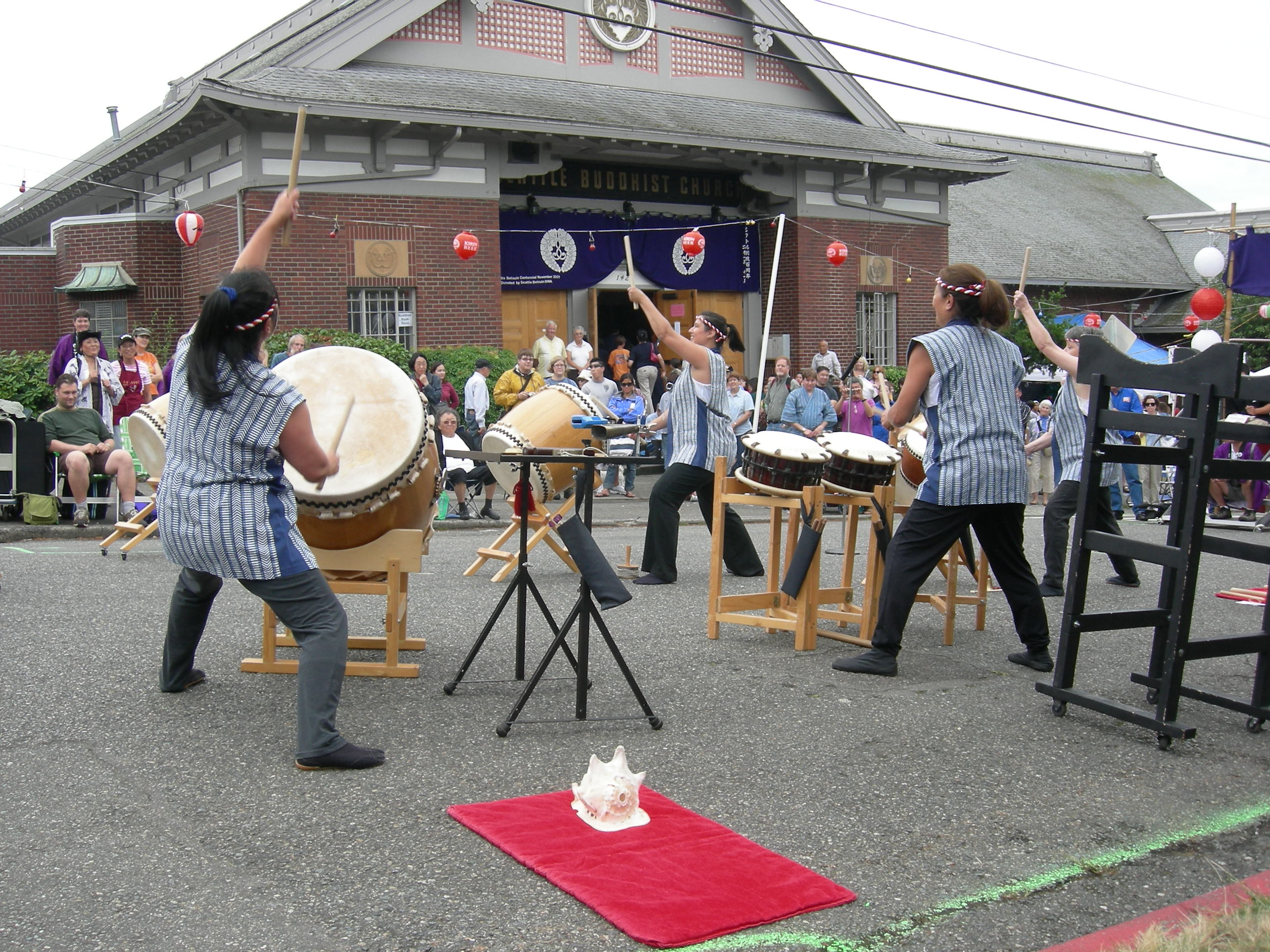
Drummers celebrate Bon Odori at Seattle Buddhist Church, Seattle, Washington.

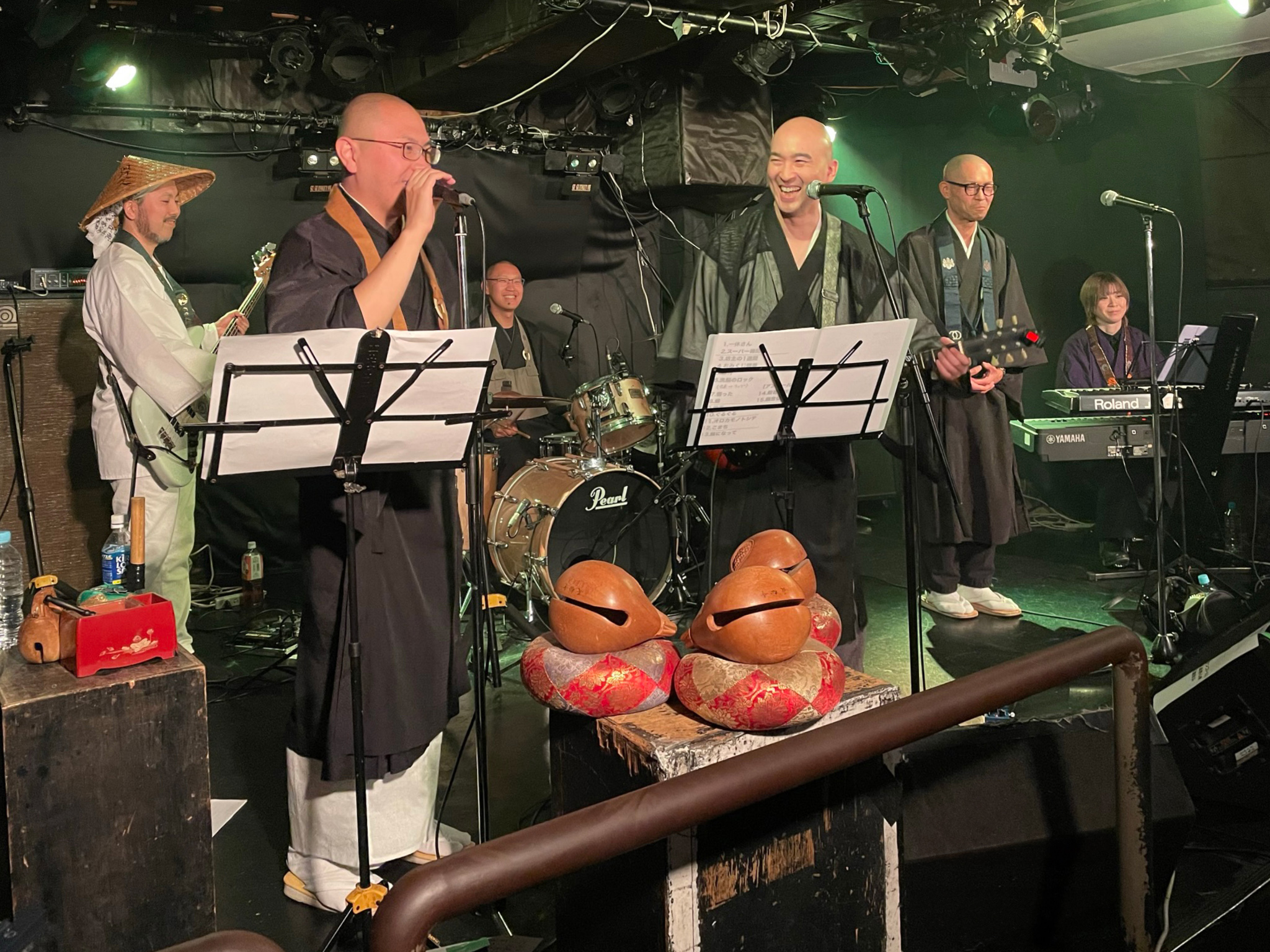
Vowz Band, a modern Japanese Buddhist band which have created rock adaptations of Buddhist chants

Japanese Buddhism includes various traditions of chanting, sutra recitation (dokyō) and Buddhist music. The vocal element is generally the most important element of Japanese Buddhist music. Chanting of the names of the Buddha (especially popular is the nembutsu), and of specific sutras (such as parts of the Lotus Sutra) is a central practice in various traditions of Japanese Buddhism. This may be accompanied by drumming, standing bells, or other instruments. Each school of Japanese Buddhism has its own style of chanting and musical instrumentation which is used in different rituals and annual observations.

One important tradition of Japanese Buddhist choral music is shōmyō (声明, lit. "bright voice"), which dates from the 12th century. This is a monophonal musical style performed by Buddhist monks which is especially important in the Tendai, Obaku, and Shingon sects. Shōmyō was influenced by Chinese Buddhist chanting which was introduced to Japan in the 8th century. Shōmyō is most often a melismatic singing unaccompanied by instrumentation, though sometimes percussion instruments (drums, clappers, gongs, bells or cymbals) may be used. One of the first performances of shōmyō was in 752, when hundreds of monks at Tōdai-ji performed hymns like Praise of the Tathagata (Nyoraibai), Falling Flowers (Sange), Sanskrit Sound (Bonnon), and Sounding Staff (Shakujo) during the kaigen ceremony for the Daibutsu (大仏, lit: "Great Buddha"). One important classic collection of shōmyō chants is the Gyosan Shōmyō Rokkan jō, compiled by Kekan (a disciple of Ryōnin) in 1173. It includes chants in Sanskrit, Chinese and Japanese, and it remains a major source of chants for the Tendai school.

A rarer tradition of shōmyō is performed by a solitary monk accompanied by a biwa (the Japanese short necked lute). There are two main styles of shōmyō: ryokyoku and rikkyoku, described as difficult and easy to remember, respectively.

Another genre of Japanese Buddhist music is Kōshiki (Japanese: 講式), a kind of ritual narrative music which originated in the Tendai school and spread to other Buddhist traditions, such as Zen Buddhism. Eventually all Japanese Buddhist schools had kōshiki repertoires. Japanese chanted poetry shigin (詩吟) is also another form of Buddhist music found in Japan. Other forms include hyobyaku (pronouncement of intention), saimon (offertory declaration), and wasan (Japanese Hymns).

The Meiji period (1868–1912) saw much innovation in Japanese Buddhist music. Japanese Buddhists modernized many of their music, often borrowing from Western musical styles. Traditional styles like shomyo were still preserved however and are still heard in Japanese Buddhist temples today. In the 2000s, Japanese clergy also began to adopt traditional Buddhist texts to modern musical genres like rock and pop music. Modern technology like vocaloids, robots, and keyboards have also been used to promote Buddhist chanting and many of these new musical compositions have spread through the internet.

==== Honkyoku ====
Honkyoku (本曲) are the pieces of shakuhachi or hocchiku music originally played by wandering Japanese Zen monks called Komuso. Komuso temples were abolished in 1871, but their honkyoku music remains popular in modern Japan. Komuso played honkyoku as a meditative practice and for alms as early as the 13th century. In the 18th century, a Komuso named Kinko Kurosawa of the Zen Fuke sect was commissioned to travel throughout Japan and collect these musical pieces. The results of several years of travel and compilation were thirty-six pieces known as the Kinko-Ryu Honkyoku.

=== Nepalese Buddhism ===
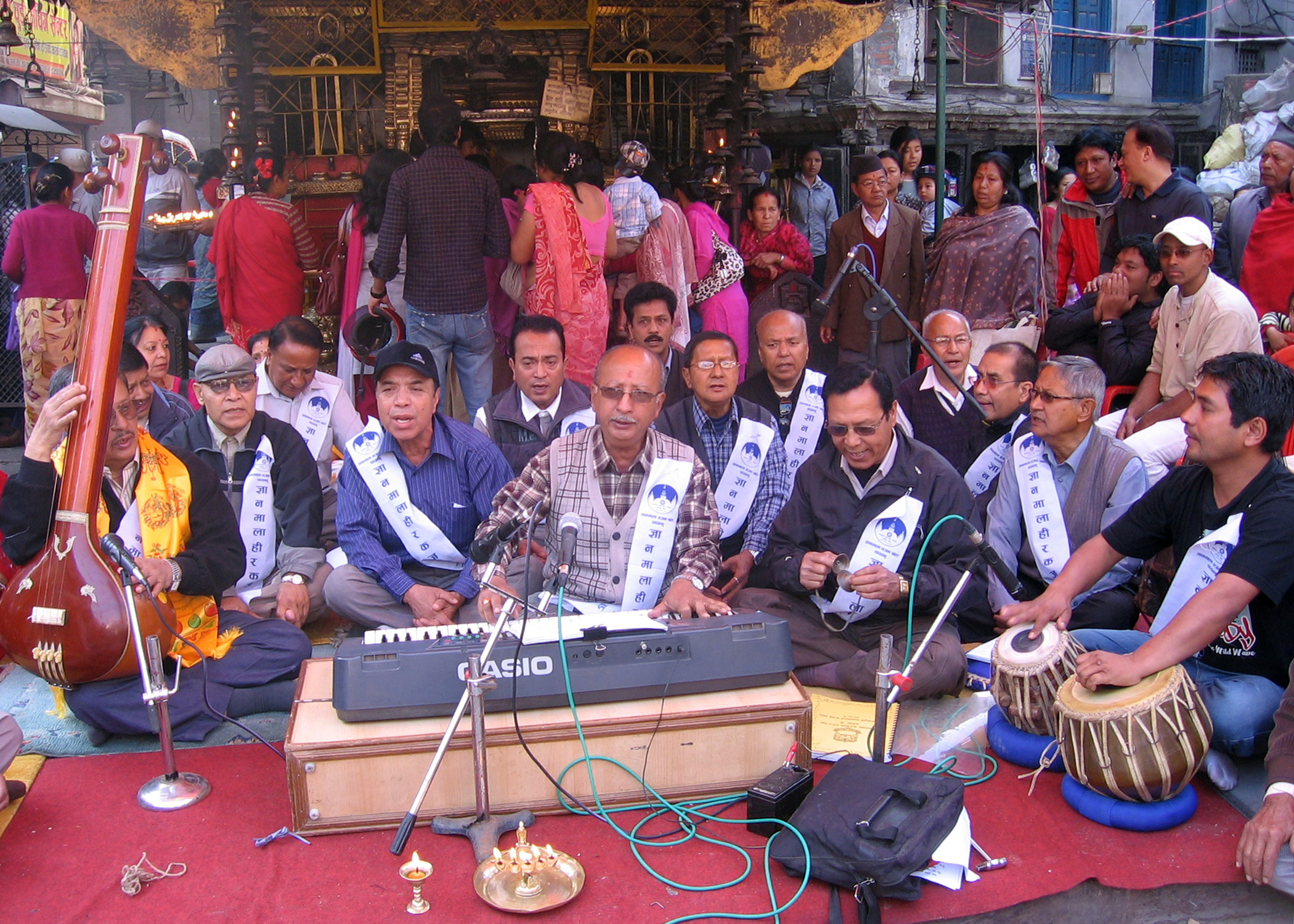
Members of the Nepalese Buddhist Gyānmālā Bhajan Khala singing with an accompaniment of modern and classic instruments, Asan, Kathmandu

The music of Nepalese Buddhism reflects native Nepalese, Tibetan and Indian musical traditions. Newar Buddhism includes a rich musical tradition which has been subject to numerous ethnographic studies. Newar musical genres include dhāpā, cācā, and bājans. Dāphā is the oldest surviving devotional musical genre of Nepal, having originated in the 17th century. It is an important role of many Newar men to practice with a local musical group.

Bhajans (bājans) are popular among both Buddhists and Hindus in Nepal, and they are performed by amateurs as well as by trained musicians. These are three main types of Buddhist bājans found in Nepalese Buddhism: mu dhimay bājans, gumlā bājans and gyānmālā bājans. Dhimay Bājan is a popular form performed by Newar farmers, who often worship both Buddhist and Hindu deities. It is performed by one or more drummers using an oversized drum (dhimay).

Gunlā Bājan is another popular genre which is commonly found during various religious processions and during the holy month of Gumlā. It is commonly practiced by groups who meet at the Svayambhū stūpa hill and circumambulate the stūpa, also visiting other sites in town. The ensembles use the small nāykhī and the larger dhā drums as well as cymbals, and woodwinds and brass instruments are also sometimes added.

The most recent style is a modern bhajan style called gyānmālā bājan which Newar Buddhists adopted from modern Indian bhajans. This style uses the Indian harmonium and tabla, and sometimes other less traditional instruments like keyboards or guitars. The Gyānmālā Bhajan society is one popular Buddhist group which is influential in the development of this modern Newari language tradition. In the 20th century, numerous Newari Buddhist authors composed new bhajans in Newari, some of them focus on teaching the Dharma, and others have a more devotional Indian bhakti style.

=== Bengali Buddhism ===
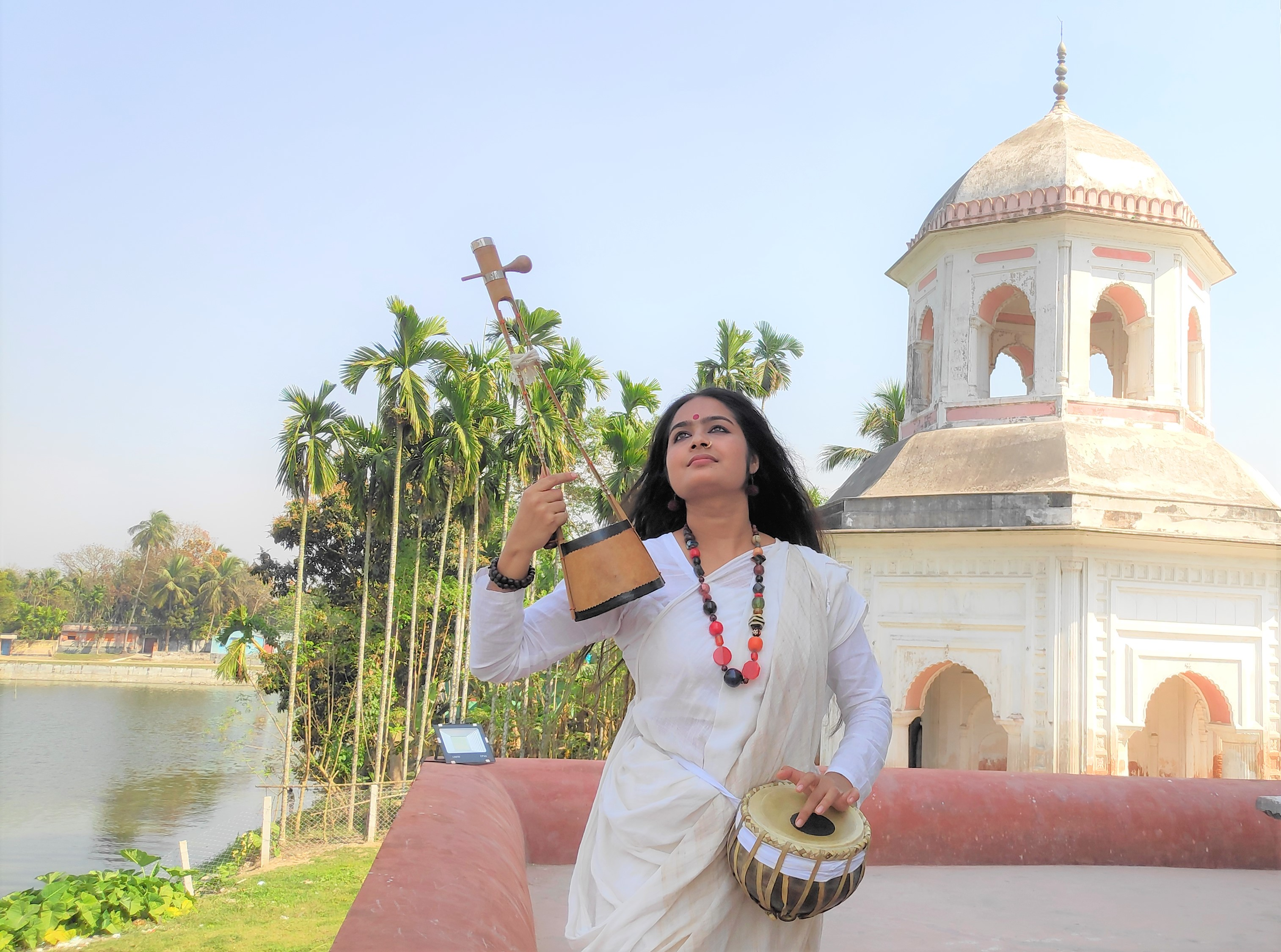
Sadhika Srijoni Tania, a Bengali singer of Buddhist Charyapada songs, with dugi and Ektara

The earliest known Bengali songs are the Buddhist Charyapadas (Songs of realization, c. 900–1100 CE) of the medieval tantric mystics.

The Baul tradition, while not a Buddhist tradition per se, still makes use of some of the Bengali Buddhist Sahaja tradition's Carya songs.

The devotional Buddhist music of Bengali Buddhists is often called Buddha-samkirtan or Buddha kirtan. It is a common practice among the Barua Buddhists of Bangladesh.

=== Himalayan and Tibetan Buddhist music ===
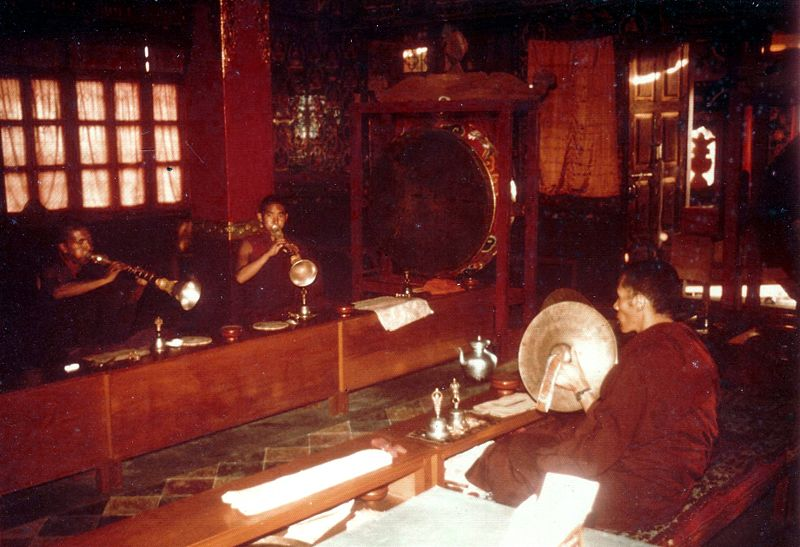
Tibetan Buddhist monks with various musical instruments used in Tibetan Buddhist rites

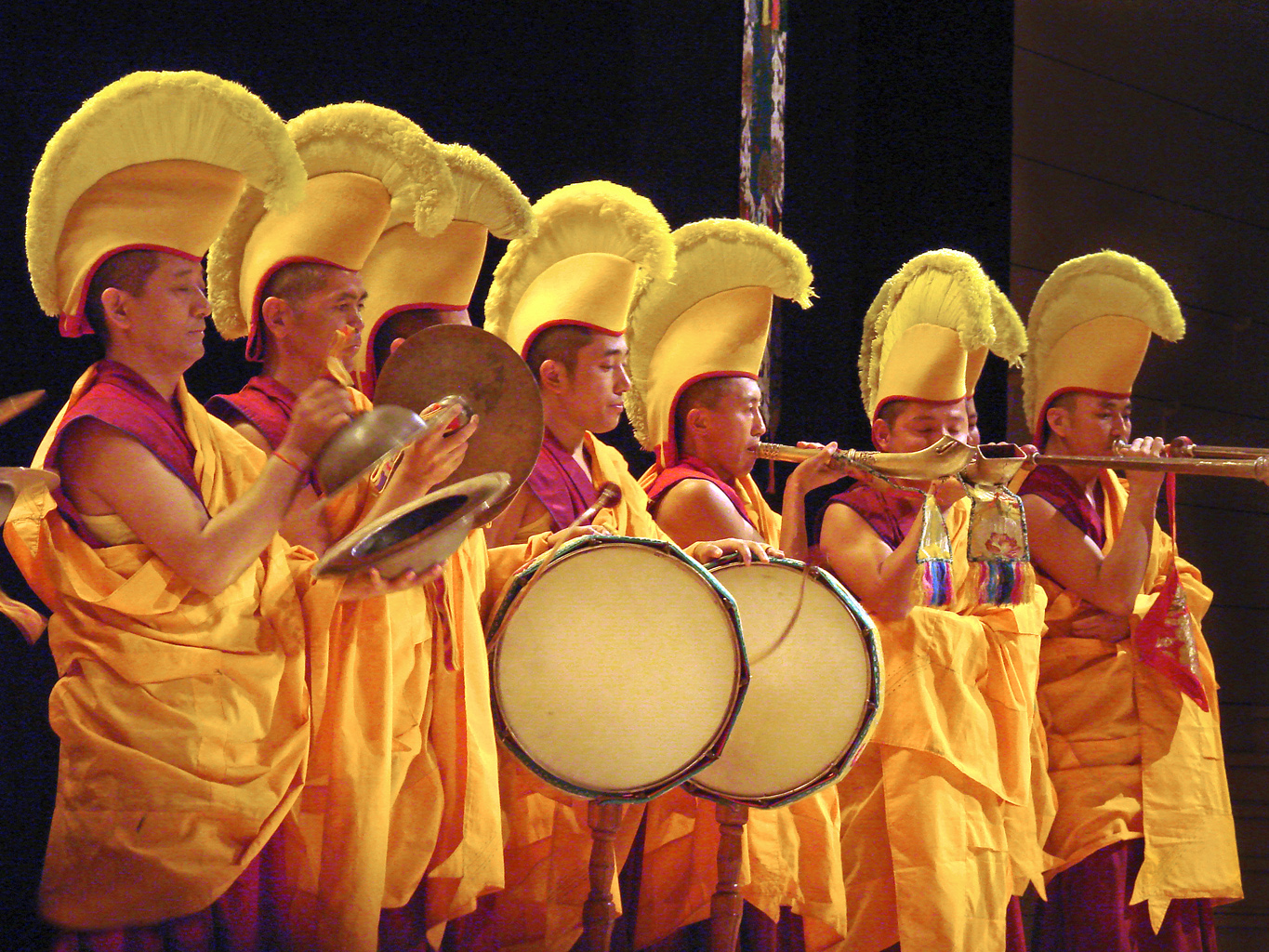
An ensemble of Tibetan monks from Nechung Monastery, Dharamsala

The Indo-Tibetan Buddhist tradition (found in Tibet, Bhutan, some north Indian states, and in the Tibetan diaspora) includes numerous musical elements, and vocal chanting accompanied by various instruments is a central feature of Himalayan Buddhism. The main distinction is between the musical traditions practiced by monastics in Buddhist monasteries and the musical traditions practiced by laypersons.

The singing of popular songs (mostly called glu) by Buddhist laypersons of the Himalayan regions is widespread. Most are secular, but chos-glu (dharma songs) are also sung. Sometimes this may be accompanied by a few instruments like the dra-nyen lute, the chiwang fiddle; and the duct flute (gling-bu). The term mgur meanwhile, refers specifically to devotional Buddhist songs, which have been traditionally used to teach Buddhism.

One of the most famous songwriter of these was the great yogi Milarepa, and his Hundred Thousand Songs remains popular today. Another influential Tibetan songwriter and musician was Gotsangpa Gonpo Dorje (1189–1258). He was originally a travelling performance artist, a pakshi, who became an influential lama and founded the Upper Druk (stod 'brug) lineage of the Drukpa Kagyu school.

There are also other traditions of musicians, including mendicant musicians, and epic storytellers (Sgrung-mkhan, who often focus on the Epic of King Gesar) and the Manipa (who sing mgur and mantras, including the famous Mani mantra).

Musical chanting, most often in Tibetan, is an integral part of Tibetan Buddhism. These chants may be simple or complex recitations of sacred texts for various occasions. Chanting accompanied by a melody (dbyangs) is often used as part of Tibetan Buddhist rituals, ceremonies, festivals, and sadhanas. Instruments like small hand drums (damaru), hand bells, and trumpets are often used in certain tantric practices. Musical instruments used in Tibetan Buddhist music include horns, cymbals, rgya-gling (oboe), gandi (wooden gong), dung dkar (conch trumpet), Mongolian yat-ga (Mongolian zither) and dra-nyen (lute).

Individual schools, and even individual monasteries, maintain their own chant traditions. Tibetan Buddhism developed its own musical notation system and manuscripts depicting this system have survived in use until the present day.

Tibetan monks are also noted for their skill at throat-singing or overtone singing. This is a specialized form of singing in which the singer can sound like he is producing separate notes simultaneously. The Cham dance is another Tibetan Buddhist performance art that includes music.

=== Music in Theravada Buddhism ===
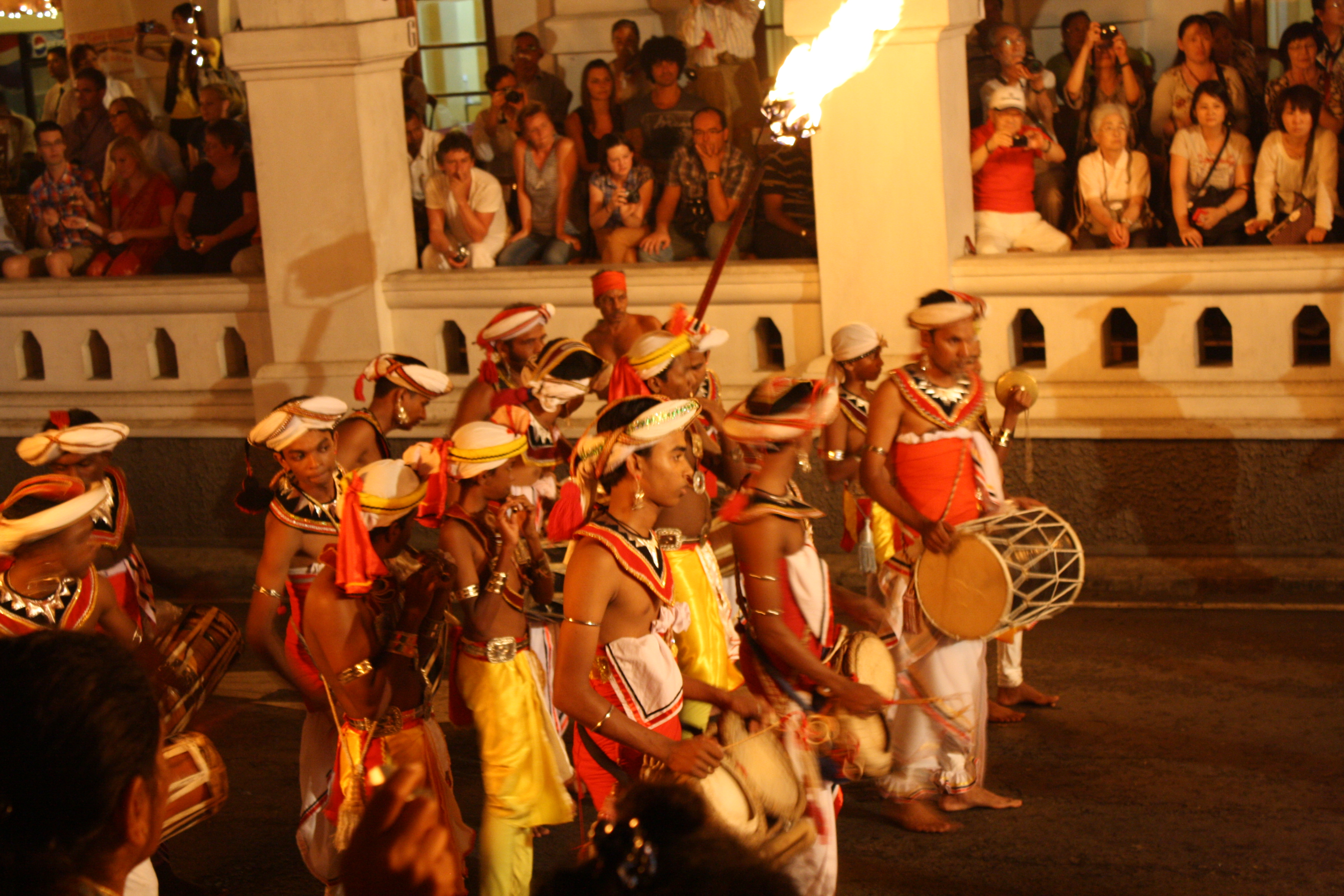
Sinhalese drummers at the Kandy Esala Perahera

In the Theravada tradition, chanting is usually done in Pali, sometimes with vernacular translations interspersed. The intonation and style of the chant varies by tradition, with some preferring a more monotone chant and others a more melodic chanting. A common type of chanting in Theravada is pirit (paritta, "protection") chanting, which is one of the oldest forms of Buddhist chanting. Among the most popular Theravada paritta chants are: Tisarana (The Three Refuges), Pancasila (The Five Precepts), Upajjhatthana (The Five Remembrances), Metta Sutta (Discourse on Loving Kindness), and Mangala Sutta (Discourse on Blessings).

Sinhalese Theravada Buddhism has various musical traditions. Some Theravada communities practice a type of religious service called poya hewisi which is accompanied by drumming. The Tooth Relic Temple is the site of one popular tradition of devotional music which make extensive use of drumming. This tradition can be traced back to the 18th century when several new musical forms arose, including prashasti ('praise songs').

There are also modern traditions of lay Buddhist instrumental ensembles called hevisi which make musical offerings (shabda puja) at Buddhist temples. Music (as well as dance and theater) is a central part of Sinhalese temple processions (perahera), such as the popular Kandy Esala Perahera.

Outside of Sri Lanka, one musical form of traditional Buddhist chanting found in Cambodian Buddhism is called Smot.

==== Myanmar ====
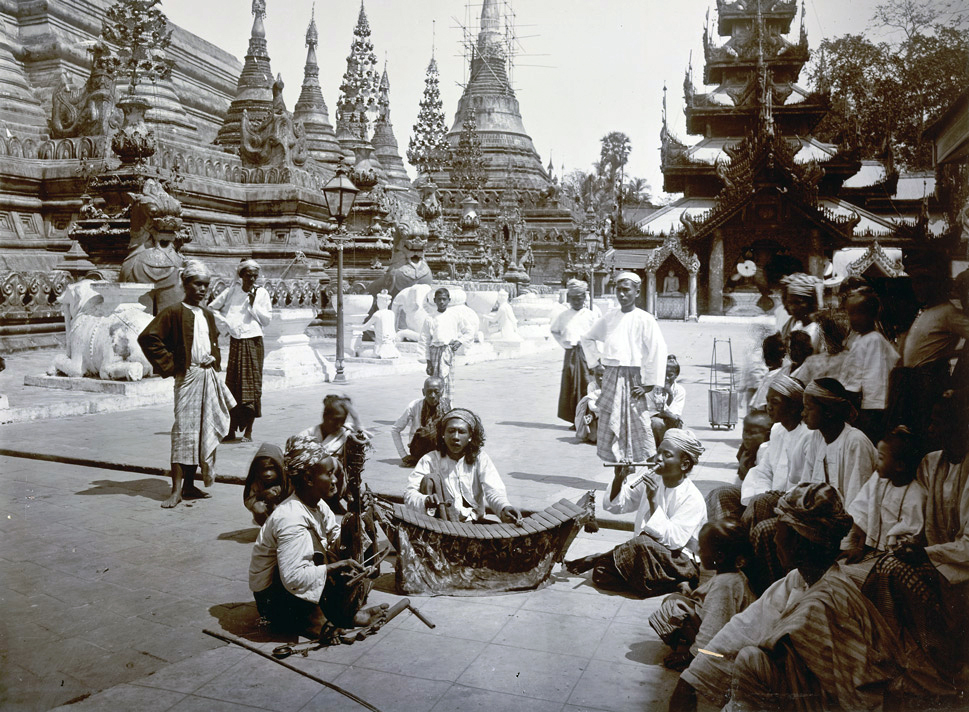
Musicians at the Shwedagon Pagoda in Yangon, Burma (Myanmar), taken by Philip Adolphe Klier in the 1890s

Myanmar is home to a broad genre of contemporary Buddhist music called dhamma thachin (ဓမ္မသီချင်း) or dhamma tay (ဓမ္မတေး, lit. 'Dhamma songs'), composed in the twentieth to twenty-first centuries. These songs draw on religious themes, and are commonly broadcast in Buddhist monasteries, and during religious festivals and donation feasts.

Popular recording artists of this genre include Soe Sandar Tun and Mandalay Thein Zaw. From a lyrical perspective, this genre can be subdivided into songs that extol the Buddha and Buddhism, and songs that exhort listeners to follow Buddhist teachings. Some compositions use traditional Burmese instruments and vocal stylings associated with the Mahāgīta, a genre of Burmese classical music.

=== Western Buddhism ===
Some contemporary Western Buddhists have adopted the various chanting and musical traditions from Asian Buddhism. Some Western Buddhists also sing about Buddhism in Western Buddhist genres, like punk, metal or folk.

Examples of Western Buddhist musicians who perform Buddhist music include Tina Turner, who has released music based on Japanese Nichiren Buddhist chanting, Lee Mirabai Harrington, who sings "Buddhist kirtan" influenced by Indian kirtan styles, the Buddhist monk Heng Sure, who has released several albums of "American Buddhist Folk Songs" and the punk band The Deathless.

=== Contemporary music genres ===
There are also several contemporary musicians which have been labeled "Buddhist music" and who make use of modern musical technology. They include popular singers like the Chinese-Malaysian Imee Ooi, the Tibetan singer Dechen Shak-Dagsay, the Japanese priest Kanho Yakushiji, American Buddhist ngakma Lee Mirabai Harrington, who sings Tibetan chants influenced by Indian kirtan styles, and the Nepalese singer Ani Choying Drolma.

Some contemporary Buddhists have adopted specific styles like Hip hop (MC Happiness), and Metal (The Firstborn).

== Influence outside of Buddhism ==
There are also a number of New Age and experimental musical forms which are related to or draw on Buddhism, some with understanding of the words, others merely based on repetition. A large number of these schools tend to be syncretic and incorporate Buddhist influences along with music of other traditions, like Hinduism. The first "New Age music" album, Music for Zen Meditation, draws on Buddhist themes.

While not strictly a variation of Buddhist chanting in itself, Japanese shigin (詩吟) is a form of chanted poetry that reflects several principles of Zen Buddhism. It is sung in the seiza position, and participants are encouraged to sing from the gut - the Zen locus of power. Shigin and related practices are often sung at Buddhist ceremonies and quasi-religious gatherings in Japan.

In 2009, the Beyond Singing Project produced an album combining Buddhist chants and Christian choral music. Tina Turner and Dechen Shak-Dagsay were involved.

Dutch gothic-symphonic metal band Epica are also incorporating and combining Tibetan monk prayer chants as background openings in 2009's Design Your Universe, 2014's The Quantum Enigma, and 2021's Omega.

The album Kannon by drone metal band Sunn O))) is about the bodhisattva Kannon.

== Notable Buddhist musicians ==
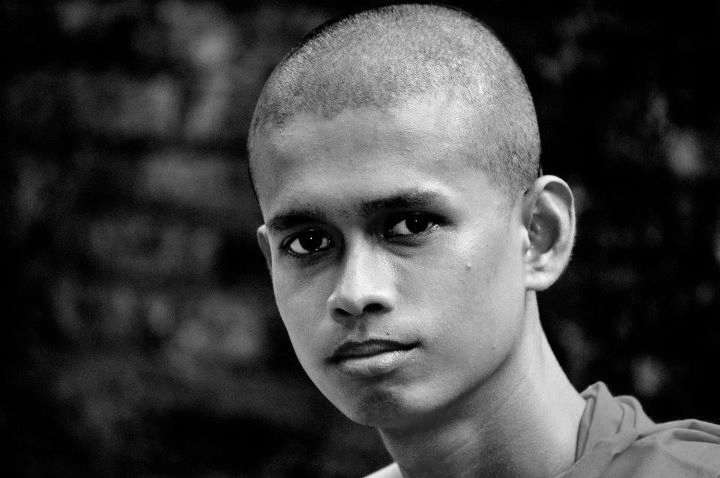
Bibiladeniye Mahanama – Sri Lankan Buddhist monk, spiritual music composer

- Ven. Bibiladeniye Mahanama Thero
- Ani Choying Dolma
- Alan Dawa Dolma
- David Bowie
- Kinko Kurosawa
- Imee Ooi
- Eliane Radigue
- Tokyo Kosei Wind Orchestra
- Adam Yauch
- Duncan Sheik
- Sergiu Celibidache
- Premasiri Khemadasa
- Dinesh Subasinghe]
- Victor Ratnayake
- Leonard Cohen
- Tan Dun
- David Earl
- John Cage
- Li Na
- Faye Wong
- Chyi Yu

== See also ==
- Buddhist bhakti
- Bhajan
- Buddhānussati – recollection of the Buddha, may include chanting
- Buddhist liturgy
- Buddhist devotion
- Dharani
- Đọc kinh
- Hindu music
- Mantras – sacred sounds, often chanted by Buddhists, Hindus, Sikhs, and Jains
- Overtone singing#Tibet
- Paritta – certain scriptures or scriptural phrases recited to ward off any danger and evil
- Puja (Buddhism)
- Sacca-kiriya
- Shōmyō
- Smot
- Throat singing

== Notes ==
=== References ===
- Indaratana Maha Thera, Elgiriye (2002). Vandana: The Album of Pali Devotional Chanting and Hymns (PDF). Penang, Malaysia: Mahindarama Dhamma Publication. Archived from the original (PDF) on 2012-11-14.
- Khantipalo, Bhikkhu (1982). Lay Buddhist Practice: The Shrine Room, Uposatha Day, Rains Residence (The Wheel No. 206/207). Kandy, Sri Lanka: Buddhist Publication Society. Transcribed (1995).
- Thanissaro Bhikkhu (trans.) (1997). AN 5.57, Upajjhatthana Sutta: Subjects for Contemplation.
- Chen, Pi-Yen (2010). Chinese Buddhist monastic chants. Middleton, Wis.: A-R Editions. ISBN 9780895796721.
- Chen, Pi-yen (Spring–Summer 2002). "The contemporary practice of the Chinese Buddhist daily service: Two case studies of the traditional in the post-traditional world". Ethnomusicology. 46 (2): 226–249. doi:10.2307/852780. JSTOR 852780.
