= Imee Ooi =

Chinese-Malaysian Record Producer

Imee Ooi Huáng Huìyīn (黃慧音)
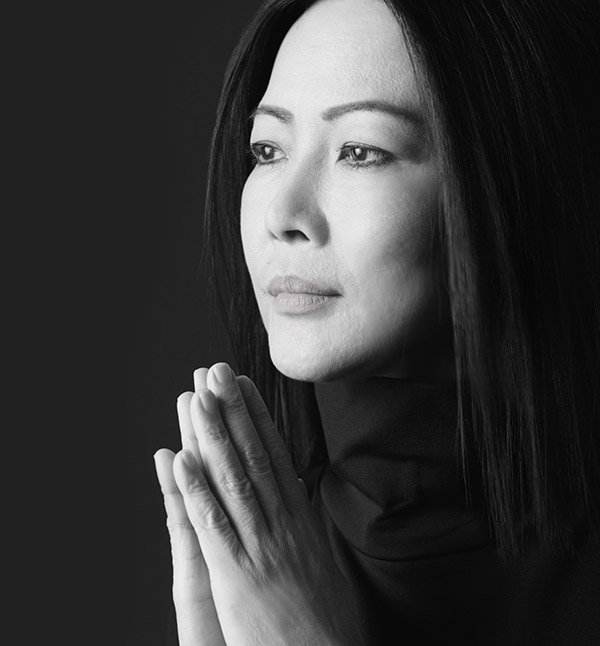

Background information
- Born: Taiping, Perak, Malaysia
- Genre: Buddhist music
- Occupations: Composer, record producer, singer
- Instrument: Piano
- Years active: 1999–present
- Label: I.M.M. Musicworks
- Website: immmusic.com

Imee Ooi

Chinese name
- Traditional Chinese: 黃慧音
- Hanyu Pinyin: Huáng Huìyīn
- Jyutping: Wong4 Wai6 Jam1
- Hokkien POJ: Ûiⁿ Hūi-im
- Tâi-lô: Uînn Huī-im

Imee Ooi FRSA (/ˈiːmiː ˈwuːi/ EE-mee WOO-ee; Chinese: 黃慧音; pinyin: Huáng Huìyīn; Jyutping: Wong4 Wai6 Jam1; Pe̍h-ōe-jī: Ûiⁿ Hūi-im) is a Chinese-Malaysian record producer, composer, and singer who composes and arranges music for classic Buddhist chant, mantra, and dharani. She performs her compositions in Sanskrit, Pali, Tibetan, and Mandarin. In 1997 she founded a record label, I.M.M. Musicworks, to publish her music. She has released more than 50 albums (55 between 1998 and 2020).

Ooi also composed and directed three highly acclaimed stage musicals: Siddhartha, Above Full Moon, and Princess Wen Cheng (aka Jewel of Tibet).

== Biography ==
=== Early life ===
Ooi was born in Taiping, Malaysia to a musically inclined Hoklo family. Her grandfather, who was a writer and dramatist, emigrated to Malaysia from Guangdong, China. Ooi's mother was a piano teacher; Imee and her four siblings all learned piano. Ooi continued her study of piano and trained as a classical pianist.

=== Career ===
In the early 1990s, after training as a classical pianist, she followed her mother's example and in turn became a piano teacher, before moving into composition, creating film music for cinema or television series.

Buddhist vegetarian, she decided to specialize in Buddhist music, creating from sacred texts (dharanis, mantras, sutras) which she performs in Sanskrit, Pali, Tibetan and Mandarin, some are translated into English. She also composes musicals and performs in concerts.

In 1997 she founded a record label, I.M.M. Musicworks, to publish her music.

In 2015, she formed the male vocal group (8 singers aged between 25 and 38), named the Jing Shi Jin Gang which means "Guardians of the Dharma" with whom she toured internationally in Malaysia, Hong Kong and Shanghai.

Imee is a discreet person. Her private life never comes up in the interviews she gives, preferring to talk only about her art and her spiritual path:

The power of music is very strong. We are trying to use music to convey positive messages. I’m a person who don't plan ahead. It is very much like Buddhist teaching – live for now, don't let the future tie you down, don't let the past trouble you and things will turn out well

== Filmography ==
=== Musicals ===
Year	Title	Notes
1999	Siddhartha (or 'Prince Siddhartha')	Music producer, arranger, composer, music director
2004	Above Full Moon	Composer, music director
2005–2006	The Perfect Circle	Composer, music director
2007	The Perfect Circle II	Composer, music director
2008	Princess Wen Cheng (alternative title: Jewel of Tibet)	Composer, music director
2010	KITA	Composer, music director, music arranger
2013	The Perfect Circle III: Earth Epilogue – The Call Out of Naimisayana	Composer, music director, arranger

== Discography ==
All songs composed, produced, and some performed by Imee Ooi arranged by Praveen maddhali

=== Solo albums ===
Title	Language(s)	Year of release	Catalog number
The Chant of Metta 慈經 （中文解述）	Pali, Mandarin	1999	IMM 1000
The Chant of Metta 慈經 （英文解述）	Pali, English	1999	IMM 1000C
Jayamangalagatha	Pali	1999	IMM 1001
Heart Sutra	Mandarin	2009	IMM 1002
Nilakantha Dharani [The Great Compassionate Mantra]	Sanskrit	2000	IMM 1003
The Great Mercy Mantra (alt. The Great Compassionate Mantra)	Tibetan	2000	IMM 1004
Om Mani Padme Hum 六字大明咒	Tibetan	2001	IMM 1023
The Guan Yin Mantra	Mandarin	2002	IMM 1008
Ratana Sutta	Pali, English	2003	IMM 1010
Mantras of the Sanskrit (alt. Mantras in Sanskrit)	Sanskrit	2003	IMM 1011
Heart Sutra	Cantonese	2003	IMM 1012
Mantra of the Green Tara	Tibetan	2003	IMM 1013
Tisarana	Pali	2004	IMM 1014
Namo Amitabha	Mandarin	2004	IMM 1017
The Diamond Sutra: Vijracchedika Prajna Paramita Sutra 金剛經	Mandarin	2005	IMM 1018
The Wisdom of Manjusri Bodhisattva	Sanskrit	2005	IMM 1019
Medicine Buddha Dharani	Sanskrit	2005	IMM 1020
Arya Ekadasa: Mukha Dharani	Sanskrit	2006	IMM 1021
The Series of Ten Short Mantras, Volume 1	Sanskrit	2006	IMM 1022
Karaniya Metta Sutta	Pali	2007	IMM 1024
The Series of Ten Short Mantras, Volume 2	Sanskrit	2007	IMM 1025
The Mantra of Guru Rinpoche	Tibetan	2007	IMM 1026
The Series of Ten Short Mantras, Volume 3	Sanskrit	2007	IMM 1027
The Series of Ten Short Mantras, Volume 4	Sanskrit	2008	IMM 1028
Chants from Heart to Heart: The Heart of Prajna Paramita and Hannya Shingyo	Pali	2008	IMM 1030
Ksitigarbha: Mantra of the Earth Store	Sanskrit	2008	IMM 1031
Message in Music, Volume 1	Meditation Music	2008	IMM 2000
Sakyamuni Buddha Mantra 釋迦牟尼佛心咒	Sanskrit	2009	IMM 1032
Message in Music, Volume 2	Meditation Music	2009	IMM 2001
Heart of Repentance	Mandarin	2009	IMM 1033
Hymns of the Pureland	Mandarin	2009	IMM 1034
The Shore Beyond: Prajna Paramaita Hrdaya Sutram	Sanskrit	2009	IMM 1035
Universal Door Chapter: The Lotus Sutra	Mandarin	2009	IMM 1036
The Mantra of Vajrasattva: Om Benza Sato Hum	Tibetan	2009	IMM 1037
Message in Music, Volume 3	Meditation Music	2009	IMM 2002
Shurangama Mantra	?	2009	IMM 1039
Maitreya: The Buddha of Loving-Kindness	Tibetan	2011	IMM 1041
The Sounds of Protection (alt. Mantras in Tibetan)	Tibetan	2011	IMM 1042
Message in Music, Volume 4	Meditation Music	2012	IMM 2003
Mantras of Illumination	Tibetan	2013	IMM 1044
White Tara Mantra	Tibetan	2014	IMM 1045
Message in Music, Volume 5 – Colours in Music	Meditation Music	2014	IMM 2004
The Six Word Great Bright Mantra-Chai Yu	Tibetan	2014	IMM 1046
Hymns of Buddhist Festivals	Mandarin	2015	IMM 1047
The Amitabha Sutra 佛說阿彌陀經	Mandarin	2015	IMM 1048
Sound of Wisdom	Mandarin, Pali	2015	IMM 1049
World of Medicine Buddha	Tibetan	2016	IMM 1050
JSJG 淨世金剛	Pali, Sanskrit, Tibetan, Mandarin	2017	IMM 1051
In Metta, A collaboration with Dewa Budjana	Tibetan, Pali	2017	IMM 2017
Message in Music, Volume 6 – Six Paramitas	Meditation Music	2017	IMM 2005
Ksitigarbha Bodhisattva Purvapranidhana Sutra 地藏菩薩本願經	Mandarin	2017	IMM 1052
Tibetan Heart Sutra 藏語心經	Tibetan	2018	IMM 1053
Message in Music, Volume 7 – Sound of the Universe	Meditation Music	2020	IMM 2006
善導祖師淨土詩偈專輯 – 彌陀頌	Mandarin	2020	-
Manjushri Bodhisattva Eight Word Mantra 文殊菩萨八字真言	Tibetan	2024	-
Holy Name Mantra that Fulfill Wishes 能令如願之名號真言	Tibetan	2024	-
Vajra Armour Mantra 金剛鎧甲心咒	Tibetan	2024	-

=== Soundtracks ===
Year of release	Released Title(s)	Date of Release (if applicable)	Notes
2002	Siddhartha: The Musical	May 2002	in Mandarin, 2 CD'S
2004	Above Full Moon The Musical	N/A	2004 version
2009	Siddhartha: The Musical	N/A	10th Anniversary Special Edition, 2009 version
2010	KITA The Musical	June 2010	Limited (did not have a widespread distribution)
2011	Princess Wen Cheng: The Musical'	N/A	2011 version
