= Yeongsan hoesang =

Korean traditional court music piece

Yeongsan hoesang (영산회상; 靈山會相) is a Korean court music repertoire originated from Buddhist music. Originally sung with 7 words chanting "Yeongsan hoesang bulbosal", the piece told the Buddha’s sermon in Mount Yeongsan, India, according to Lotus Sutra. After a long period, the piece is now performed instrumentally. There are 3 versions (Sam-yeongsanhoesang) including the play for wind instruments (pyojeongman bangjigok), strings (hyeonak yeongsan hoesang) and combination of string and wind instruments (pyeongjo hoesang).

A Yeongsan hoesang play consists of 8 episodes which can be played fully without break either certain pieces presented separately. Tempo gradually increases during each episode except for the sixth episode that is slower than previous episode.

The 8 episodes are:

- sangyeongsan
- jungyeongsan
- seryeongsan
- garak dodeuri
- samhyeon hwanip
- yeombul hwanip
- taryeong
- gunak

Instruments used in Yeongsanhoesang are sepiri (small piri), daegeum (large bamboo flute), danso (short bamboo flute), haegeum (2 stringed fiddle), gayageum (12 stringed-zither), geomungo (6 stringed-zither), janggu (hourglass-shaped drum) and yanggeum (western style zither).
