= Gyanmala Bhajan Khala =

Nepalese hymn society

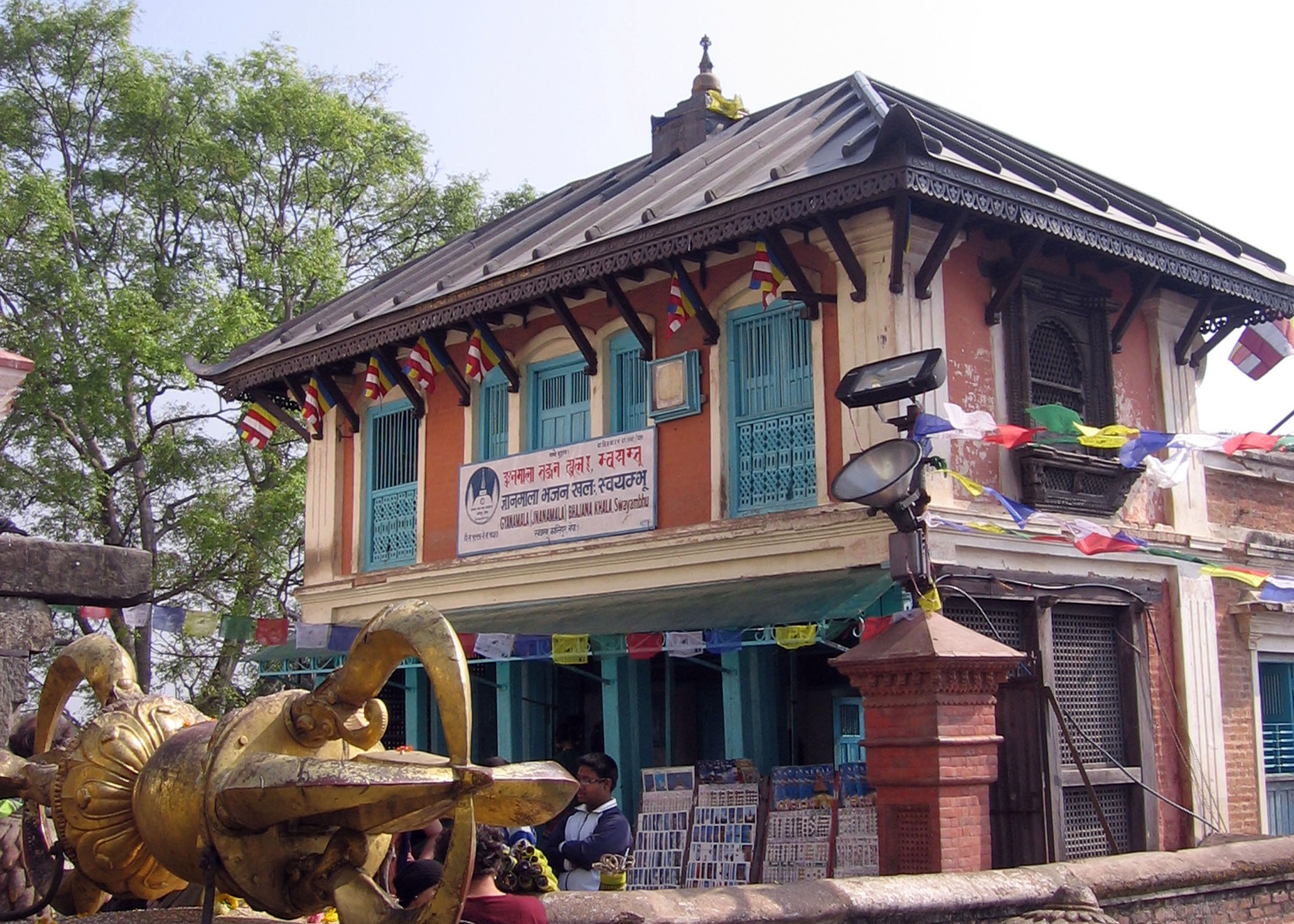
The rest house at Swayambhu where Gyanmala Bhajan Khala is based.

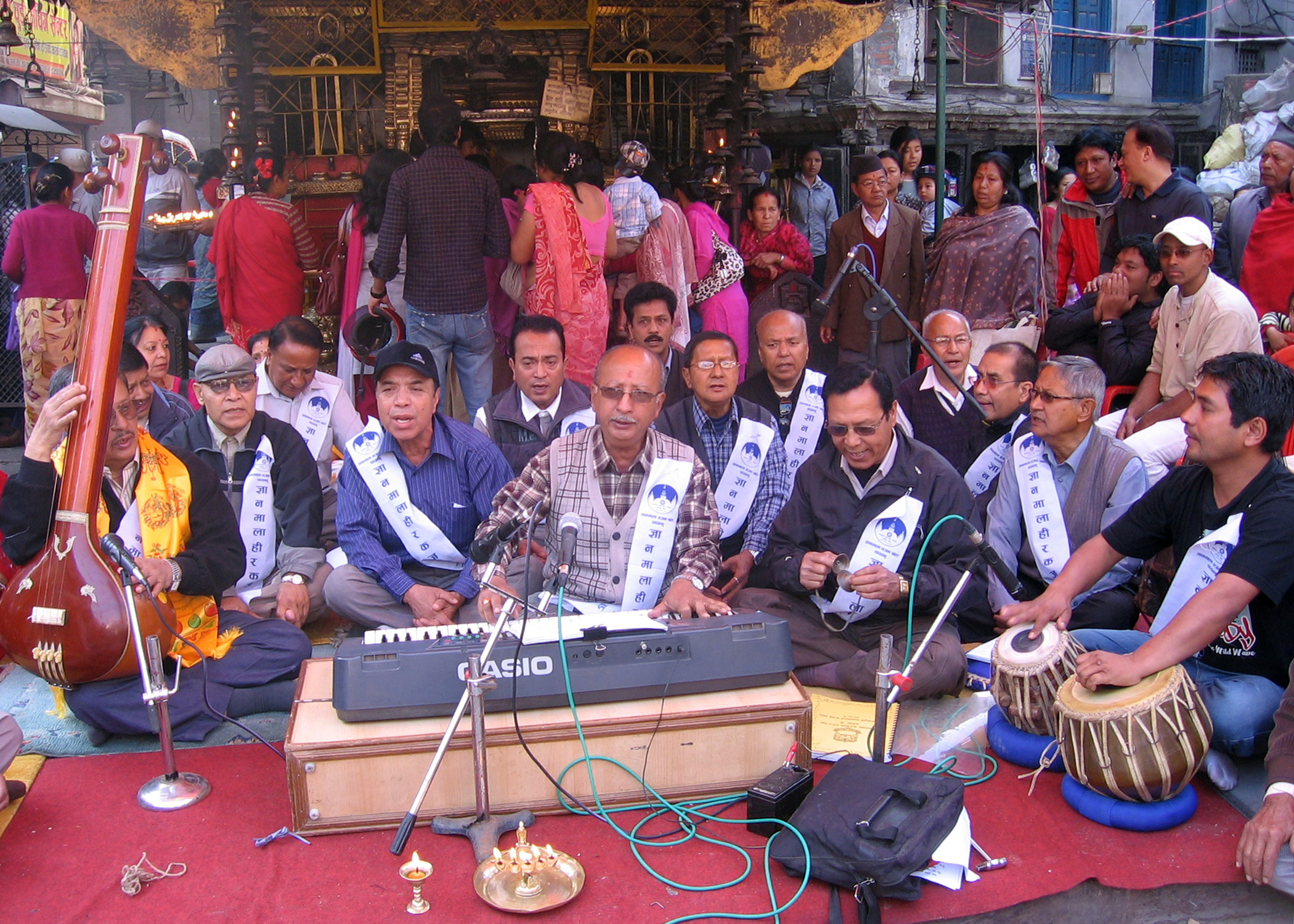
Members of Annapurna Gyanmala Bhajan Khala singing hymns at Asan, Kathmandu.

Gyānmālā Bhajan Khala (Devanagari: ज्ञानमाला भजन खल) is a Nepalese hymn society formed in Kathmandu in 1937. It helped to raise awareness against the oppression of the Rana regime (1846–1951), and is also a symbol of the movement for religious freedom in Nepal.

Gyānmālā Bhajan Khala mostly performs Buddhist devotional songs. It is based in Swayambhu, Kathmandu, and has chapters across the country and abroad.

== Early history ==
Gyānmālā Bhajan Khala popularized the singing of bhajans to the accompaniment of the harmonium. This style entered Nepal in the 1880s. The traditional devotional songs sung in the Kathmandu Valley are known as "dāpā" or "dāphā", and are accompanied by the "khin" (double-headed drums) and "tā" (small cymbals).

Gyānmālā Bhajan Khala was established in the face of state suppression against Buddhism and Nepal Bhasa. The Ranas were harsh against Buddhism and the language of the Newar people, and any religious or literary expression was quashed. Members of Gyānmālā Bhajan Khala were arrested for singing Buddhist hymns in Nepal Bhasa, and their hymn books confiscated.

The founding of Gyānmālā Bhajan Khala coincided with the resurgence of Theravada Buddhism in Nepal in the 1930s. Newly ordained monks encouraged their followers to sing Buddhist hymns, and they published song books for them from India as it was illegal to do so in Nepal. Bhikshu Pragyabhivamsha published the first hymn book in Kushinagar, and another monk Bhikshu Dhammalok brought hundreds of copies to Kathmandu. Dhammalok was later punished for his activities to promote Buddhism. In 1944, he and seven other monks were expelled from the country by the Rana regime.

As hymn singing became popular and a number of groups were formed, there was a move towards making the songs educational instead of keeping them purely devotional. So from 1943, the hymns and hymn groups were called Gyānmālā ("garland of wisdom").

== Police harassment ==
The hymn singers had to suffer repeated police harassment for singing in Nepal Bhasa. They were also accused of converting Hindus to Buddhists. In 1944, members of Gyanmala singing Buddhist hymns led a procession from Swayambhu to Jana Baha in Kathmandu. The police stopped the procession and confiscated their song books.

On another occasion in 1945, the police broke up a singing session at the rest house at Swayambhu where they usually held their recitals. They ransacked the place and took away all the hymn books they could find.

== Present times ==
After the fall of the Ranas with the revolution of 1951, the group was formally organized and dedicated itself to recitation of hymns, preservation of the sacred site of Swayambhu and humanitarian work. In 1990, it was restructured as a national organization.

Swayambhu Gyanmala Bhajan Khala is based in a rest house at Swayambhu. Recitals are held here in the morning on holidays and daily during the Buddhist holy month of Gunla. It presently has 70 chapters nationwide and one each in Kalimpong, India and London, UK.
