= Kōshiki =

Japanese Buddhist musical narrative

Kōshiki (Japanese: 講式) is a liturgical genre in Japanese Buddhism consisting of the musical venerations of various subjects such as buddhas, kami, and even music itself. While the creation of the genre is often attributed to Saichō, the founder of the Tendai school of Buddhism, the earliest known works were written by the monk Genshin in 986.
