= 1 Chronicles 2 =

First Book of Chronicles, chapter 2

- ← chapter 1 chapter 3 →
- The complete Hebrew text of the Books of Chronicles (1 and 2 Chronicles) in the Leningrad Codex (1008 CE).
- Book: Books of Chronicles
- Category: Ketuvim
- Christian Bible part: Old Testament
- Order in the Christian part: 13

1 Chronicles 2 is the second chapter of the Books of Chronicles in the Hebrew Bible or the First Book of Chronicles in the Old Testament of the Christian Bible. The book is compiled from older sources by an unknown person or group, designated by modern scholars as "the Chronicler", and had the final shape established in late fifth or fourth century BCE. This chapter and two subsequent ones focus on the descendants of Judah, where chapter 2 deals with the tribe of Judah in general, chapter 3 lists the sons of David in particular and chapter 4 concerns the remaining families in the tribe of Judah and the tribe of Simeon. These chapters belong to the section focusing on the list of genealogies from Adam to the lists of the people returning from exile in Babylon (1 Chronicles 1:1 to 9:34).

== Text ==
This chapter was originally written in the Hebrew language. It is divided into 55 verses.

=== Textual witnesses ===
Some early manuscripts containing the text of this chapter in Hebrew are of the Masoretic Text tradition, which includes the Aleppo Codex (10th century), and Codex Leningradensis (1008).

There is also a translation into Koine Greek known as the Septuagint, made in the last few centuries BCE. Extant ancient manuscripts of the Septuagint version include Codex Vaticanus (B; $\mathfrak{G}$^{B}; 4th century) and Codex Alexandrinus (A; $\mathfrak{G}$^{A}; 5th century). (Note: The extant Codex Sinaiticus only contains 1 Chronicles 9:27–19:17.)

=== Old Testament references ===
- 1 Chronicles 2:1–2: Genesis 35:23–26
- 1 Chronicles 2:3: Genesis 38:3–5; Numbers 26:19–21
- 1 Chronicles 2:4: Genesis 38:29–30; Numbers 26:19–21
- 1 Chronicles 2:5: Genesis 46:12; Numbers 26:19–21
- 1 Chronicles 2:6: Joshua 7:1; 1 Kings 5:11
- 1 Chronicles 2:7: Joshua 7:1
- 1 Chronicles 2:9–12: Ruth 4:19–22
- 1 Chronicles 2:13–15: 1 Samuel 16:5–13
- 1 Chronicles 2:16–17: 2 Samuel 2:18; 2 Samuel 17:25

== Structure ==
Verses 1–2 are part of the introduction to establish 'Israel's worldwide context' by listing the ancestors from Adam to Israel's twelve sons (1 Chronicles 1:1–2:2).

The remaining verses belong to an arrangement comprising 1 Chronicles 2:3–8:40 with the king-producing tribes of Judah (David; 2:3–4:43) and Benjamin (Saul; 8:1–40) bracketing the series of lists as the priestly tribe of Levi (6:1–81) anchors the center, in the following order:

A David's royal tribe of Judah (2:3–4:43)

B Northern tribes east of Jordan (5:1–26)

X The priestly tribe of Levi (6:1–81)

B' Northern tribes west of Jordan (7:1–40)

A' Saul's royal tribe of Benjamin (8:1–40)

Another concentric arrangement focuses on David's royal tribe of Judah (2:3–4:23), centering on the family of Hezron, Judah's grandson, through his three sons: Jerahmeel, Ram, and Chelubai (Caleb), as follows:

A Descendants of Judah: Er, Onan, and Shelah (2:3–8)

B Descendants of Ram up to David (2:9–17)

C Descendants of Caleb (2:18–24)

D Descendants of Jerahmeel (2:25–33)
D' Descendants of Jerahmeel (2:34–41)

C' Descendants of Caleb (2:42–55)

B' Descendants of Ram following David [David's descendants] (3:1–24)

A' Descendants of Shelah, Judah s only surviving son (4:21–23)

== The family of Israel (2:1–2) ==
^{1} These are the sons of Israel; Reuben, Simeon, Levi, and Judah, Issachar, and Zebulun,
^{2} Dan, Joseph, and Benjamin, Naphtali, Gad, and Asher.

- "Israel": is "Jacob" (Genesis 10:3). In Chronicles he is exclusively called Israel (not Jacob), except for the citation of Psalm 105 at 1 Chronicles 16:17.

The twelve sons of Israel are not listed by birth order (cf. Genesis 29:31–30:24; Genesis 35:16–18), but arranged based on Genesis 35:22–26 as follows:

1. the six sons of Leah;
2. Dan, the son of Rachel's handmaid;
3. the sons of Rachel;
4. the remaining sons of the handmaids.

Dan is placed before the sons of Rachel (cf. Genesis 35:23) perhaps in reference to Rachel's wishing that the son of her maid Bilhah to be accounted her own (Genesis 30:3–6). The subsequent parts mention every tribe with the exception of Zebulun and Dan, without any explanation of the omission. Nonetheless, Zebulun is mentioned in the Levitical town lists (1 Chronicles 6:63, 77) and in some narratives (1 Chronicles 12:33, 40, 27:19, 2 Chronicles 30:10–11, 18), whereas Dan is mentioned in Chronicles only in three places (1 Chronicles 12:35, 27:22, 2 Chronicles 2:13–14).

== From Judah to David (2:3–17) ==
The family of Judah has the largest genealogy among the tribes of Israel, about 100 verses in 3 chapters, with the house of David as the main focus. Verses 3–5 are related mainly to Genesis 38, as well as to Genesis 46:12 and Numbers 26:19–22, whereas verse 5 is also tied to Ruth 4:18. The list of Hezron's descendants started in verse 9 with the emphasis on the family of Ram ben Hezron down to David and his siblings (verse 17). Verses 10–12 contain the line from Ram to Jesse, whose seven sons are listed in verses 13–17, and the last of these is David, as the climax of the chapter. These verses (including verse 9) are linked to Ruth 4:19–22 (cf. 1 Samuel 16:6–10; 17:13). David was the seventh son in verse 15, whereas 1 Samuel 16:10–11; 17:12 assumes eight sons of Jesse. Nethaneel, Raddai, and Ozem are not mentioned in other texts. David's sisters are mentioned in verses 16–17 (cf. 2 Samuel 17:25).

=== Verse 7 ===
And the sons of Carmi; Achar, the troubler of Israel, who transgressed in the thing accursed.

- Cross reference: Joshua 7:1
- "Achar": refers the story reported in Joshua 7:25, with a play on words, that the Chronicler renamed "Achan" in the Book of Joshua, to "Achar", because he brought "trouble" (achar) upon Israel.

== The extended family of Hezron ben Perez (2:18–24) ==
=== Verse 20 ===
And Hur begot Uri, and Uri begot Bezalel.

- "Bezalel": the chief builder of the Tabernacle (Exodus 31:2, Exodus 35:30).

== The family of Jerahmeel ben Hezron (2:25–41) ==
Verses 34–35 display special attitude of the Chronicler towards foreigners: because Sheshan had no sons, his line would continue through his daughters and an Egyptian servant.

== The family of Caleb ben Hezron (2:42–55) ==
The other descendants of Caleb are enumerated in 1 Chronicles 2:42-49, of which the two latter, 1 Chronicles 2:46-55, are the descendants from his concubines.

=== Verse 42 ===
Now the sons of Caleb the brother of Jerahmeel were Mesha his firstborn, which was the father of Ziph; and the sons of Mareshah the father of Hebron.

- "Caleb brother of Jerahmeel": is the same person as "Caleb son of Hezron" (1 Chronicles 2:18) and "Chelubai" (1 Chronicles 2:9).

== See also ==
- Chronology of the Bible
- Davidic line
- Kings of Israel and Judah
- Kings of Judah
- Tree of Jesse
- Related Bible parts: Genesis 29, Genesis 35, Genesis 38, Genesis 46, Exodus 31, Exodus 35, Numbers 26, Joshua 7, Ruth 4, 1 Samuel 16, 1 Samuel 17, Matthew 1, Luke 3

== Sources ==
- Ackroyd, Peter R (1993). "Chronicles, Books of". In Metzger, Bruce M; Coogan, Michael D (eds.). The Oxford Companion to the Bible. Oxford University Press. pp. 113–116. ISBN 978-0195046458.
- Bennett, William (2018). The Expositor's Bible: The Books of Chronicles. Litres. ISBN 978-5040825196.
- Coogan, Michael David (2007). Coogan, Michael David; Brettler, Marc Zvi; Newsom, Carol Ann; Perkins, Pheme (eds.). The New Oxford Annotated Bible with the Apocryphal/Deuterocanonical Books: New Revised Standard Version, Issue 48 (Augmented 3rd ed.). Oxford University Press. ISBN 9780195288810.
- Endres, John C. (2012). First and Second Chronicles. Liturgical Press. ISBN 9780814628447.
- Gilbert, Henry L (1897). "The Forms of the Names in 1 Chronicles 1-7 Compared with Those in Parallel Passages of the Old Testament". The American Journal of Semitic Languages and Literatures. 13 (4). Liturgical Press: 279–298. doi:10.1086/369250. JSTOR 527992.
- Hill, Andrew E. (2003). First and Second Chronicles. Zondervan. ISBN 9780310206101.
- Mabie, Frederick (2017). "I. The Chronicler's Genealogical Survey of All Israel". In Longman III, Tremper; Garland, David E (eds.). 1 and 2 Chronicles. The Expositor's Bible Commentary. Zondervan. pp. 267–308. ISBN 978-0310531814.
- Mathys, H. P. (2007). "14. 1 and 2 Chronicles". In Barton, John; Muddiman, John (eds.). The Oxford Bible Commentary (first (paperback) ed.). Oxford University Press. pp. 267–308. ISBN 978-0199277186.
- Tuell, Steven S. (2012). First and Second Chronicles. Westminster John Knox Press. ISBN 978-0664238650.
- Throntveit, Mark A. (2003). "Was the Chronicler a Spin Doctor? David in the Books of Chronicles". Word & World. 23 (4): 374–381.
- Ulrich, Eugene, ed. (2010). The Biblical Qumran Scrolls: Transcriptions and Textual Variants. Brill.
- Würthwein, Ernst (1995). The Text of the Old Testament. Translated by Rhodes, Erroll F. Grand Rapids, MI: William B. Eerdmans. ISBN 0-8028-0788-7.
