= 1 Samuel 20 =

First Book of Samuel chapter

- ← chapter 19 chapter 21 →
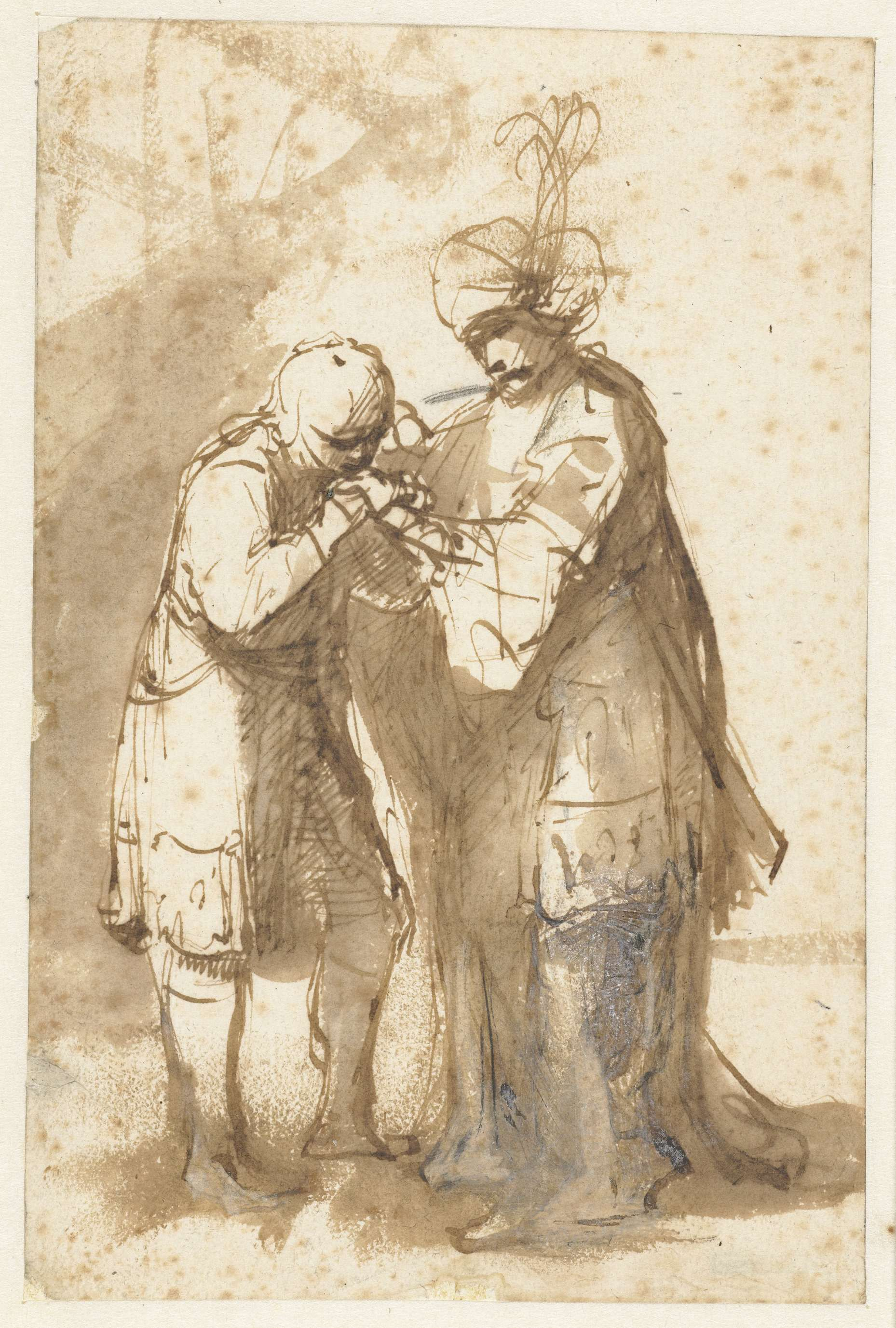
- "David and Jonathan" by Rembrandt (1640).
- Book: First book of Samuel
- Hebrew Bible part: Nevi'im
- Order in the Hebrew part: 3
- Category: Former Prophets
- Christian Bible part: Old Testament
- Order in the Christian part: 9

1 Samuel 20 is the twentieth chapter of the First Book of Samuel in the Old Testament of the Christian Bible or the first part of the Books of Samuel in the Hebrew Bible. According to Jewish tradition, the book was attributed to the prophet Samuel, with additions by the prophets Gad and Nathan, but modern scholars view it as a composition of a number of independent texts throughout c. 630–540 BCE. This chapter contains the account of David's escape from Saul's repeated attempts to kill him. This is within a section comprising 1 Samuel 16 to 2 Samuel 5 that records the rise of David as the king of Israel.

== Text ==
This chapter was originally written in the Hebrew language. It is divided into 42 verses.

=== Textual witnesses ===
Some early manuscripts containing the text of this chapter in Biblical Hebrew are of the Masoretic Textual tradition, which includes the Codex Cairensis (895), Aleppo Codex (10th century), and Codex Leningradensis (1008). Fragments containing parts of this chapter in Hebrew were found among the Dead Sea Scrolls including 4Q51 (4QSam^{a}; 100–50 BCE) with extant verses 37–40 and 4Q52 (4QSam^{b}; 250 BCE) with extant verses 26–42.

Extant ancient manuscripts of a translation into Koine Greek known as the Septuagint (originally was made in the last few centuries BCE) include Codex Vaticanus (B; $\mathfrak{G}$^{B}; 4th century) and Codex Alexandrinus (A; $\mathfrak{G}$^{A}; 5th century). (Note: The whole book of 1 Samuel is missing from the extant Codex Sinaiticus.)

== Places ==
Places mentioned in this chapter
- Bethlehem
- Naioth in Ramah

== Analysis ==
A continuing major theme in this chapter is how Saul's family acted against Saul and sided with David—especially Jonathan, who had previously managed to reconcile both of them and now was forced to take a side. Jonathan initially upheld his father's oath not to harm David (1 Samuel 19:6) and therefore refused to believe that David's life was in danger. Nevertheless, he agreed to test Saul's true intentions during the celebration of Rosh Chodesh (Biblical Hebrew: [/roʊʔʃ ˈχo.deʃ/]; רֹאשׁ חֹדֶשׁ, 'head [of the] month')—the New Moon festival of Judaism—and to inform David of the outcome using their prearranged coded signal. At this time, Saul explicitly told Jonathan that his dynasty of kingship, the House of Saul (בֵּית שָׁאוּל, Bêt Šāʾûl), could not be realized as long as David was alive. However, Saul's blind ambition had enlarged the extent of the rift between him and his family, to the point that his enmity towards David had "isolated him from his own kin".

== Jonathan and David renew their covenant (20:1–29) ==
After escaping from Saul's pursuit in Naioth, David once again sought Jonathan to find out why Saul wanted to kill him. They agreed on a method whereby Jonathan, after establishing Saul's intention, would inform David, unknown to anyone else.

=== Verse 5 ===
And David said to Jonathan: Indeed, tomorrow is the New Moon, and I should not fail to sit with the king to eat. But let me go, that I may hide in the field until the third day at evening.

- "New Moon" (רֹאשׁ חֹדֶשׁ, Rosh Chodesh, 'head [of the] month'): a monthly festival that consists of korbanot (קָרְבָּנוֹת, 'sacrificial offerings') and celebratory feasting, which was also observed in other parts of ancient world, including Mesopotamia and Babylonia. The feast may have required the entire clan to be present, and this was used as an excuse for David to be absent before the king. The eldest son was likely to gather all the members, so David requested permission to go to "see my brothers" (1 Samuel 20:29). According to this chapter, the feast lasted for three days.

=== Verse 19 ===
And when you have stayed three days, go down quickly and come to the place where you hid on the day of the deed; and remain by the stone Ezel.

- "Have stayed three days": from the Biblical Hebrew שִׁלַּשְׁתָּ (šilláš·tā, lit. 'you did [it] a third time'), which could be emended into שִׁלִּישִׁית (šillîšît, lit. 'third' or 'a third portion'), per the Christian New English Translation.

== Saul seeks to kill Jonathan (20:30–42) ==
Jonathan opened the conversation with Saul by providing an excuse for David's absence, then with a defense of David (verse 32) echoing David's own words in verse 1, which moved from being a position of conciliator between David and Saul to being David's defender under threat from his father (verses 30–33). Saul's fierce reply and attempt to kill Jonathan show that David had little choice but to leave Saul's court and run away, not out of disloyalty nor for his own ambition, but due to events beyond his control. A promise is made by David to extend his covenant with Jonathan to include Jonathan's "house" (verse 15) and his "descendants" (verse 42), anticipating David's kindness to Jonathan's son, Mephibosheth (2 Samuel 9), and the survival of the house of Saul.

=== Verse 41 ===
When the boy got there, David emerged from his concealment at the Negeb. He flung himself face down on the ground and bowed low three times. They kissed each other and wept together; David wept the longer.

- "At the Negeb": translated from the Masoretic Text (מֵאֵ֣צֶל הַנֶּ֔גֶב, mēʾēṣel hanneg̲eb̲). The Septuagint, as the Codex Vaticanus, renders it "from the Argab" (ἀργὰβ, argàb, 'stone heap') or "from beside the mound". In contrast, the Codex Alexandrinus of the Septuagint has "from sleep." The Targum Jonathan renders the phrase as "from beside the Stone of the Sign, which is facing South" (Jewish Palestinian Aramaic: מִסְטַר אֶבֶן אָתָא דְלָקֳבֵיל דָרוֹמָא, romanized: mistar ʾeven ʾātāʾ d-lāqobēl daromāʾ), corresponding to the Masoretic Hebrew "from beside the south" (מֵאֵצֶל הַנֶּגֶב, meʾētsel han-negev). Syriac and Arabic versions harmonize with verse 19 by repeating the reference to Ezel, where "Nagev" is a loanword from the Hebrew "Negev" ('arid land'). The Arabic and Syriac versions also have the repetition of the statement in 1 Samuel 20:19.

== See also ==
- Abner
- Javelin
- Jesse
- Jonathan and David
- Oath
- Related Bible parts: 1 Samuel 15, 1 Samuel 18, 1 Samuel 19

== Sources ==
=== Commentaries on Samuel ===
- Auld, Graeme (2003). "1 & 2 Samuel". In James D. G. Dunn and John William Rogerson (ed.). Eerdmans Commentary on the Bible. Eerdmans. ISBN 9780802837110.
- Bergen, David T. (1996). 1, 2 Samuel. B&H Publishing Group. ISBN 9780805401073.
- Chapman, Stephen B. (2016). 1 Samuel as Christian Scripture: A Theological Commentary. Wm. B. Eerdmans Publishing Company. ISBN 978-1467445160.
- Evans, Paul (2018). Longman, Tremper (ed.). 1-2 Samuel. The Story of God Bible Commentary. Zondervan Academic. ISBN 978-0310490944.
- Gordon, Robert (1986). I & II Samuel, A Commentary. Paternoster Press. ISBN 9780310230229.
- Hertzberg, Hans Wilhelm (1964). I & II Samuel, A Commentary (trans. from German 2nd edition 1960 ed.). Westminster John Knox Press. p. 19. ISBN 978-0664223182.
- Tsumura, David Toshio (2007). The First Book of Samuel. Eerdmans. ISBN 9780802823595.

=== General ===
- Breytenbach, Andries (2000). "Who Is Behind The Samuel Narrative?". In Johannes Cornelis de Moor and H.F. Van Rooy (ed.). Past, Present, Future: the Deuteronomistic History and the Prophets. Brill. ISBN 9789004118713.
- Coogan, Michael David (2007). Coogan, Michael David; Brettler, Marc Zvi; Newsom, Carol Ann; Perkins, Pheme (eds.). The New Oxford Annotated Bible with the Apocryphal/Deuterocanonical Books: New Revised Standard Version, Issue 48 (Augmented 3rd ed.). Oxford University Press. ISBN 978-0195288810.
- Fitzmyer, Joseph A. (2008). A Guide to the Dead Sea Scrolls and Related Literature. Grand Rapids, MI: William B. Eerdmans Publishing Company. ISBN 9780802862419.
- Halley, Henry H. (1965). Halley's Bible Handbook: an abbreviated Bible commentary (24th (revised) ed.). Zondervan Publishing House. ISBN 0-310-25720-4.
- Hayes, Christine (2015). Introduction to the Bible. Yale University Press. ISBN 978-0300188271.
- Jones, Gwilym H. (2007). "12. 1 and 2 Samuel". In Barton, John; Muddiman, John (eds.). The Oxford Bible Commentary (first (paperback) ed.). Oxford University Press. pp. 196–232. ISBN 978-0199277186.
- Klein, R.W. (2003). "Samuel, books of". In Bromiley, Geoffrey W (ed.). The International Standard Bible Encyclopedia. Eerdmans. ISBN 9780802837844.
- Knight, Douglas A (1995). "Chapter 4 Deuteronomy and the Deuteronomists". In James Luther Mays, David L. Petersen and Kent Harold Richards (ed.). Old Testament Interpretation. T&T Clark. ISBN 9780567292896.
- Ulrich, Eugene, ed. (2010). The Biblical Qumran Scrolls: Transcriptions and Textual Variants. Brill.
- Würthwein, Ernst (1995). The Text of the Old Testament. Translated by Rhodes, Erroll F. Grand Rapids, MI: Wm. B. Eerdmans. ISBN 0-8028-0788-7.
