= 1 Samuel 19 =

First Book of Samuel chapter

- ← chapter 18 chapter 20 →
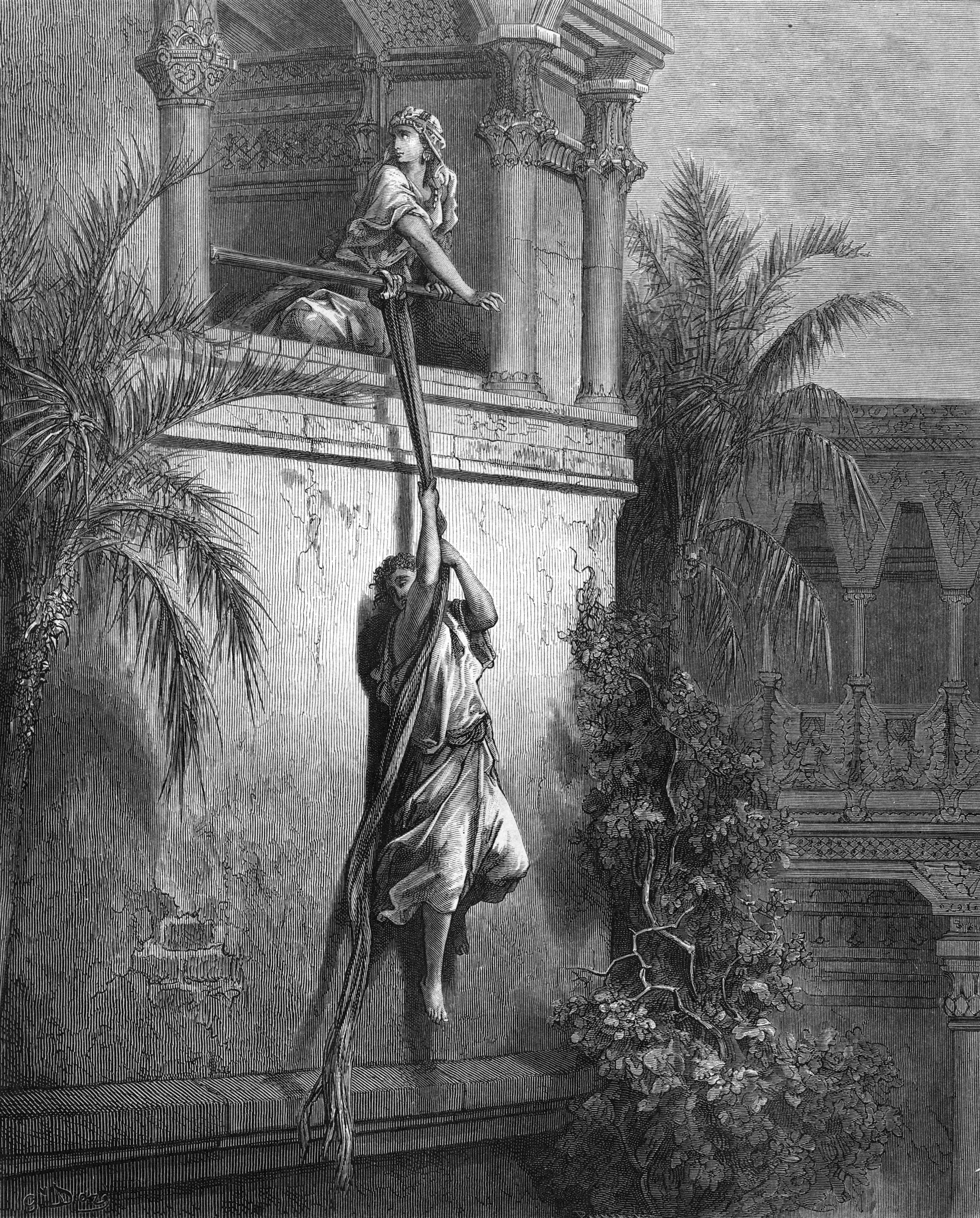
- "Michal lets David escape from the window". A painting by Gustave Doré, 1865.
- Book: First book of Samuel
- Hebrew Bible part: Nevi'im
- Order in the Hebrew part: 3
- Category: Former Prophets
- Christian Bible part: Old Testament
- Order in the Christian part: 9

1 Samuel 19 is the nineteenth chapter of the First Book of Samuel in the Old Testament of the Christian Bible or the first part of the Books of Samuel in the Hebrew Bible. According to Jewish tradition, the book was attributed to the prophet Samuel, with additions by the prophets Gad and Nathan, but modern scholars view it as a composition of a number of independent texts composed c. 630–540 BCE. This chapter contains the account of David's escape from Saul's repeated attempts to kill him. This is within a section comprising 1 Samuel 16 to 2 Samuel 5, which records the rise of David as the king of Israel.

== Text ==
This chapter was originally written in the Hebrew language. It is divided into 24 verses.

=== Textual witnesses ===
Some early manuscripts containing the text of this chapter in Hebrew are of the Masoretic Text tradition, which includes the Codex Cairensis (895), Aleppo Codex (10th century), and Codex Leningradensis (1008). Fragments containing parts of this chapter in Hebrew were found among the Dead Sea Scrolls including 4Q52 (4QSam^{b}; 250 BCE) with extant verses 10–13, 15–17.

Extant ancient manuscripts of a translation into Koine Greek known as the Septuagint (originally was made in the last few centuries BCE) include Codex Vaticanus (B; $\mathfrak{G}$^{B}; 4th century) and Codex Alexandrinus (A; $\mathfrak{G}$^{A}; 5th century). (Note: The whole book of 1 Samuel is missing from the extant Codex Sinaiticus.)

== Places ==
Places mentioned in this chapter
- Naioth in Ramah

== Analysis ==
David became a member of Saul's household with his marriage to Michal, but that did not stop Saul trying to kill David as Saul openly shared this plan with his trusted servants (verse 1). Ironically the loyalty of Saul's own children, Jonathan and Michal, saved David from Saul's further attempts.

== Saul tried to kill David (19:1–10) ==
Saul's renewed plans to kill David were now brought into the open (verse 1), but Jonathan became David's conciliator, reminding Saul that David was innocent and that his success was YHWH's victory, so Saul should not kill a person endowed with divine power like David. Saul listened and promised under divine oath not to kill David (verse 5), then accepted David again in his court. However, after David achieved another victory over the Philistines, Saul's anger was aroused again (verses 8–10), and he again tried to pin David to the wall with a javelin, but one more time David managed to escape.

=== Verse 9 ===
And the evil spirit from the LORD was upon Saul, as he sat in his house with his javelin in his hand: and David played with his hand.

- "Played with his hand": that is, played on some instrument of music with hand, particularly a harp or a lyre, to drive away the evil spirit from Saul. This shows David's humility, that, being a successful officer in the army, he was still willing to be a musician to Saul.

== Michal saved David's life (19:11–24) ==
After an unsuccessful attempt to kill David with his spear, Saul set a guard around David's residence with the order to kill David the next morning (verse 11). David's wife, Michal, warned him of her father's evil plan (verse 11), helped him to escape (verse 12), and to give him time using a makeshift mannequin consisting of a teraphim (Biblical Hebrew: תְּרָפִים, romanized: tᵊrāp̄îm, 'household idols')—a garment and goats' hair (as a 'wig')—to confirm the impression that he was sick in bed (verses 13–17). A point is made that David was saving his own life (verse 11) and that Michal, so as not to displease her father, was not participating in the escape, but in obedience to David only assisted him in executing it (verse 17); thus, she was loyal to both sides.

David went to meet Samuel at his base (1 Samuel 7:17), and they journeyed together to Naioth in the Rameh area, which was a prophetic center just as Nob was a priestly center. Saul sent three groups of messengers, but each was "seized by prophetic frenzy", which also happened to Saul himself when he decided to go to Naioth, in a deliberate act to defy YHWH, even when he had the same experience before (1 Samuel 10:12; 11:6).

=== Verse 13 ===
And Michal took an image and laid it in the bed, put a cover of goats' hair for his head, and covered it with clothes.

- "An image": from the Hebrew teraphim, a plural noun that appears 15 times in the Hebrew Bible and is generally meant as "household gods" (i.e., household idols) or "statue[s] of ancestors". Clearly varying in size, Rachel, Jacob's wife, could hide the teraphim she stole from Laban, her father, beneath her saddle (Genesis 31:19), whereas Michal could use the teraphim at her house to be disguised as David's sleeping body. Biblical texts condemn the use of teraphim as idols and for divination. It is ironic that Saul's plan to kill David was thwarted by a (disguised) teraphim, while Samuel previously had likened Saul's disobedience to teraphim use (1 Samuel 15:23).

=== Verse 24 ===
And he stripped off his clothes also, and prophesied before Samuel in like manner, and lay down naked all that day and all that night. Wherefore they say, Is Saul also among the prophets?

- "Stripped off his clothes": may be symbolic to the loss of his kingdom, just as Saul's tearing of Samuel's clothes signifying the tearing away of Saul's kingdom (1 Samuel 15:27–28) and Jonathan giving his clothes to David signifying the acceding of his throne to the latter (1 Samuel 18:1).
- "All that day and all that night": the length of time Saul was immobilized certainly gave David enough time to escape.
- "Is Saul also among the prophets?" This saying is explained differently from the one in 1 Samuel 10:5-12: in the present context, the incident demonstrates how Saul's possession by the spirit is used by YHWH to protect David. This, the spirit has become "a sign of disfavor and a means of protecting God's chosen one".

== See also ==
- Demon
- Javelin
- Michal
- Philistines
- Spirit of God
- Related Bible parts: 1 Samuel 15, 1 Samuel 17, 1 Samuel 18

== Sources ==
=== Commentaries on Samuel ===
- Auld, Graeme (2003). "1 & 2 Samuel". In James D. G. Dunn and John William Rogerson (ed.). Eerdmans Commentary on the Bible. Eerdmans. ISBN 9780802837110.
- Bergen, David T. (1996). 1, 2 Samuel. B&H Publishing Group. ISBN 9780805401073.
- Chapman, Stephen B. (2016). 1 Samuel as Christian Scripture: A Theological Commentary. Wm. B. Eerdmans Publishing Company. ISBN 978-1467445160.
- Evans, Paul (2018). Longman, Tremper (ed.). 1-2 Samuel. The Story of God Bible Commentary. Zondervan Academic. ISBN 978-0310490944.
- Gordon, Robert (1986). I & II Samuel, A Commentary. Paternoster Press. ISBN 9780310230229.
- Hertzberg, Hans Wilhelm (1964). I & II Samuel, A Commentary (trans. from German 2nd edition 1960 ed.). Westminster John Knox Press. p. 19. ISBN 978-0664223182.
- Tsumura, David Toshio (2007). The First Book of Samuel. Eerdmans. ISBN 9780802823595.

=== General ===
- Breytenbach, Andries (2000). "Who Is Behind The Samuel Narrative?". In Johannes Cornelis de Moor and H.F. Van Rooy (ed.). Past, Present, Future: the Deuteronomistic History and the Prophets. Brill. ISBN 9789004118713.
- Coogan, Michael David (2007). Coogan, Michael David; Brettler, Marc Zvi; Newsom, Carol Ann; Perkins, Pheme (eds.). The New Oxford Annotated Bible with the Apocryphal/Deuterocanonical Books: New Revised Standard Version, Issue 48 (Augmented 3rd ed.). Oxford University Press. ISBN 978-0195288810.
- Fitzmyer, Joseph A. (2008). A Guide to the Dead Sea Scrolls and Related Literature. Grand Rapids, MI: William B. Eerdmans Publishing Company. ISBN 9780802862419.
- Halley, Henry H. (1965). Halley's Bible Handbook: an abbreviated Bible commentary (24th (revised) ed.). Zondervan Publishing House. ISBN 0-310-25720-4.
- Hayes, Christine (2015). Introduction to the Bible. Yale University Press. ISBN 978-0300188271.
- Jones, Gwilym H. (2007). "12. 1 and 2 Samuel". In Barton, John; Muddiman, John (eds.). The Oxford Bible Commentary (first (paperback) ed.). Oxford University Press. pp. 196–232. ISBN 978-0199277186.
- Klein, R.W. (2003). "Samuel, books of". In Bromiley, Geoffrey W (ed.). The International Standard Bible Encyclopedia. Eerdmans. ISBN 9780802837844.
- Knight, Douglas A (1995). "Chapter 4 Deuteronomy and the Deuteronomists". In James Luther Mays, David L. Petersen and Kent Harold Richards (ed.). Old Testament Interpretation. T&T Clark. ISBN 9780567292896.
- Ulrich, Eugene, ed. (2010). The Biblical Qumran Scrolls: Transcriptions and Textual Variants. Brill.
- Würthwein, Ernst (1995). The Text of the Old Testament. Translated by Rhodes, Erroll F. Grand Rapids, MI: Wm. B. Eerdmans. ISBN 0-8028-0788-7.
