= 1 Chronicles 1 =

First Book of Chronicles, chapter 1

- ← 2 Kings 25 chapter 2 →
- The complete Hebrew text of the Books of Chronicles (1 and 2 Chronicles) in the Leningrad Codex (1008 CE).
- Book: Books of Chronicles
- Category: Ketuvim
- Christian Bible part: Old Testament
- Order in the Christian part: 13

1 Chronicles 1 is the first chapter of the Books of Chronicles in the Hebrew Bible or the First Book of Chronicles in the Old Testament of the Christian Bible. The book is compiled from older sources by an unknown person or group, designated by modern scholars as "the Chronicler", and had the final shape established in late fifth or fourth century BCE. The content of this chapter is the genealogy list from Adam to Israel (=Jacob) in the following structure: Adam to Noah (verses 1–4); Noah's descendants from his three sons Shem, Ham, and Japheth: the Japhethites (verses 5–7), Hamites (verses 8–23), Semites (verses 24–27); the sons of Abraham (verses 28–34a); the sons of Isaac (34b–54; continued to 2:2 for Israel's sons). This chapter belongs to the section focusing on the list of genealogies from Adam to the lists of the people returning from exile in Babylon (1 Chronicles 1:1 to 9:34).

== Text ==
This chapter was originally written in the Hebrew language and is divided into 54 verses.

=== Textual witnesses ===
Some early manuscripts containing the text of this chapter in Hebrew are of the Masoretic Text tradition, which includes the Aleppo Codex (10th century), and Codex Leningradensis (1008).

There is also a translation into Koine Greek known as the Septuagint, made in the last few centuries BCE. Extant ancient manuscripts of the Septuagint version include Codex Vaticanus (B; $\mathfrak{G}$^{B}; 4th century) and Codex Alexandrinus (A; $\mathfrak{G}$^{A}; 5th century). (Note: The extant Codex Sinaiticus only contains 1 Chronicles 9:27–19:17.)

=== Old Testament references ===
- 1 Chronicles 1:1–4: Genesis 5:3–28
- 1 Chronicles 1:4–23: Genesis 10:1–29
- 1 Chronicles 1:24–27: Genesis 11:10–26
- 1 Chronicles 1:29–31: Genesis 25:13–16
- 1 Chronicles 1:32–33: Genesis 25:1–4
- 1 Chronicles 1:35: Genesis 36:4–5
- 1 Chronicles 1:36–37: Genesis 36:11–13
- 1 Chronicles 1:38–54: Genesis 36:20–43

== From Adam to Abraham (1:1–27) ==
The list of names is taken exclusively from the Book of Genesis and reduced to a 'skeletal framework', with some omissions of those 'whose lines ended with their deaths', such as Cain's descendants and Abraham's brothers. It links the origin of Israel to the origin of all people – Abraham's ancestry in Adam and Noah's – and thus, within the whole human history. Verses 1–4 (from Adam to Noah) match closely to the genealogy in Genesis 5:1–32; verses 5–12 (the genealogy of Noah's sons) match that in Genesis 10:1–32; verses 13–27 (Shem's descendants until Abraham) parallel the genealogy in Genesis 11:10–26. Verse 27 contains "Abram, that is, Abraham" (the name first given by God in Genesis 17:1), representing a jump from Genesis 11 to Genesis 17.

=== Verse 1 ===
Adam, Seth, Enosh;

Noah was the immediate descendant of Seth, so it is not necessary to mention Cain and Abel, or any of the other sons of Adam.

=== Verse 4 ===
Noah, Shem, Ham, and Japheth.

- "Shem, Ham, and Japheth": these are the sons of Noah, and not successive generations, as can be read in the Book of Genesis (Genesis 5–10), which is apparently a source for the Books of Chronicles. These names are listed this way in Masoretic Text and Latin Vulgate, whereas the Greek Septuagint (LXX) adds "the sons of Noah" before "Shem,..."

=== Verse 6 ===
And the sons of Gomer; Ashchenaz, and Riphath, and Togarmah.

- "Riphath": the same as in Genesis 10:3 (רִיפַ֖ת), following many medieval Hebrew manuscripts, LXX and Vulgate, and used in some English translations (NAB, NIV, NLT, etc.), while others (ASV, NASB, NRSV, etc.) follow the Masoretic Text in using "Diphath" (דִיפַ֖ת).

== The descendants of Abraham (1:28–54) ==
This section focuses on the offsprings of Abraham (but none of his brothers'). Verses 32–40 lists Abraham's sons other than Isaac and Ishmael with the direct connection to verse 28 and has been more extensively reworked than other genealogies in this chapter, whereas verses 43–54 contain an extensive reworking of Genesis 36 to list the descendants of Edom who are Judah's neighbors with 'the closest ties through the best and worst of times'.

=== Verse 39 ===
And the sons of Lotan; Hori, and Homam: and Timna was Lotan's sister.

- Cross reference: Genesis 36:22
- "Timna": a daughter of Seir, who became a concubine to Eliphaz, the son of Esau, and the mother of Amalek (Genesis 36:12). Rashi states that the lineage of Timna was traced because she willingly wished to become a concubine to the seed of Abraham, saying, "If I am not worthy to marry him, I shall be his concubine." (Gen. Rabbah 84:14; Sanh. 99b)

== See also ==
- Chronology of the Bible
- Davidic line
- Generations of Adam
- Generations of Noah (Table of Nations)
- Kings of Israel and Judah
- Kings of Judah
- Tree of Jesse
- Related Bible parts: Genesis 5, Genesis 10, Genesis 11, Genesis 22, Genesis 25, Genesis 36, Matthew 1, Luke 3

== Sources ==
- Ackroyd, Peter R (1993). "Chronicles, Books of". In Metzger, Bruce M; Coogan, Michael D (eds.). The Oxford Companion to the Bible. Oxford University Press. pp. 113–116. ISBN 978-0195046458.
- Bennett, William (2018). The Expositor's Bible: The Books of Chronicles. Litres. ISBN 978-5040825196.
- Coogan, Michael David (2007). Coogan, Michael David; Brettler, Marc Zvi; Newsom, Carol Ann; Perkins, Pheme (eds.). The New Oxford Annotated Bible with the Apocryphal/Deuterocanonical Books: New Revised Standard Version, Issue 48 (Augmented 3rd ed.). Oxford University Press. ISBN 9780195288810.
- Endres, John C. (2012). First and Second Chronicles. Liturgical Press. ISBN 9780814628447.
- Gilbert, Henry L (1897). "The Forms of the Names in 1 Chronicles 1-7 Compared with Those in Parallel Passages of the Old Testament". The American Journal of Semitic Languages and Literatures. 13 (4). Liturgical Press: 279–298. doi:10.1086/369250. JSTOR 527992.
- Hill, Andrew E. (2003). First and Second Chronicles. Zondervan. ISBN 9780310206101.
- Mabie, Frederick (2017). "I. The Chronicler's Genealogical Survey of All Israel". In Longman III, Tremper; Garland, David E (eds.). 1 and 2 Chronicles. The Expositor's Bible Commentary. Zondervan. pp. 267–308. ISBN 978-0310531814.
- Mathys, H. P. (2007). "14. 1 and 2 Chronicles". In Barton, John; Muddiman, John (eds.). The Oxford Bible Commentary (first (paperback) ed.). Oxford University Press. pp. 267–308. ISBN 978-0199277186.
- Ulrich, Eugene, ed. (2010). The Biblical Qumran Scrolls: Transcriptions and Textual Variants. Brill.
- Würthwein, Ernst (1995). The Text of the Old Testament. Translated by Rhodes, Erroll F. Grand Rapids, MI: William B. Eerdmans. ISBN 0-8028-0788-7.
