= Pastor =

Ordained leader of a Christian congregation

A pastor is the leader of a Christian congregation who also gives advice and counsel to people from the community or congregation. (Note: "Pastor may be abbreviated to "Ps", "Pr", "Pstr.", "Ptr." or "Psa" (singular); or "Ps" (plural).) In Lutheranism, Catholicism, Eastern Orthodoxy, Oriental Orthodoxy and Anglicanism, pastors are always ordained. In Methodism, pastors may be either licensed or ordained.

The word pastor is derived from a Latin word meaning "shepherd", and the terms "pastor" and "pastoral" are used more widely to reflect care for believing communities using this metaphor. Bishops of various denominations often bear a formal crosier in the form of a stylised shepherd's crook as a symbol of their pastoral/shepherding functions.

A pastor preaches at a church in Tennessee.

== Terminology ==
The word pastor derives from the Latin noun pastor which means "shepherd" and is derived from the verb pascere – "to lead to pasture, set to grazing, cause to eat". The term "pastor" also relates to the role of elders within the New Testament, and is synonymous with the biblical understanding of the word "minister". Amongst contemporary Protestant Christians, terms pastor, shepherd, and elder are all the same position.

== Biblical texts ==
The Hebrew Bible (or Old Testament) uses the Hebrew word רעה (roʿeh), which is used as a noun as in "shepherd" and as a verb as in "to tend a flock." It occurs 173 times in 144 Old Testament verses and relates to the literal feeding of sheep, as in Genesis 29:7. In Jeremiah 23:4, both meanings are used (ro'im is used for "shepherds" and yir'um for "shall feed them"), "And I will set up shepherds over them which shall feed them: and they shall fear no more, nor be dismayed, neither shall they be lacking, saith the LORD." (KJV).

The New Testament typically uses the words "bishops" (Acts 20:28) and "presbyter" (1 Peter 5:1) to indicate the ordained leadership in early Christianity. However, the word "pastor" (ποιμήν/poimēn) is only used once to describe church leadership in the New Testament in Ephesians 4:11, which says, "that some would be apostles, some prophets, some evangelists, some pastors, and teachers" (NRSV). Peter instructs church leadership using the verb 'to tend the flock' (lit. 'to shepherd,' ποιμαίνω/poimainō) of God that is in your charge, exercising the oversight (1 Peter 5:2 NRSV). The words "bishop" and "presbyter" were sometimes used in an interchangeable way, such as in Titus 1:5-6. However, there is an ongoing dispute between branches of Christianity over whether there are two ordained classes (presbyters and deacons) or three (bishops, priests/presbyters, and deacons). The first view is affirmed by some Presbyterians. On the other hand, Christians of the Roman Catholic, Assyrian, Eastern Orthodox, Oriental Orthodox, Moravian, Scandinavian Lutheran, Anglican, Old Catholic and other Presbyterian traditions maintain the latter view, with all but the Presbyterians affirming the doctrine of apostolic succession.

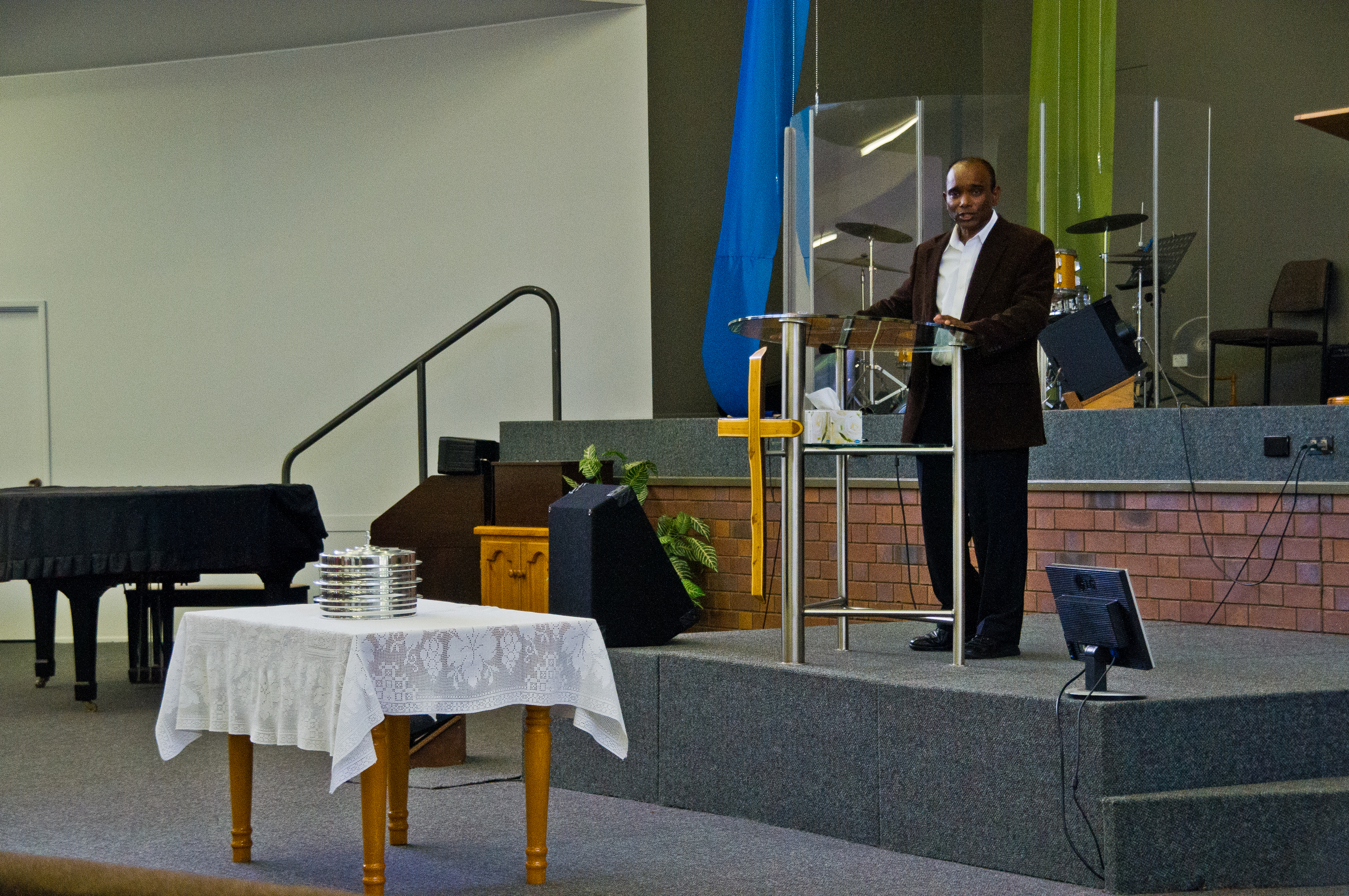
A pastor with an open Bible on a stand

These terms describe a leader (e.g., bishop), one who maintains a careful watch for the spiritual needs of all the members of the flock (i.e., a pastor). The person must meet scriptural qualifications (1 Timothy 3:1–7; Titus 1:5–9). For some Protestants, whether called an elder, bishop, or pastor, these terms describe the same service in the church. In the early Church, only a man could be a presbyter (1 Timothy 2:11–14), but many Protestant denominations in the 19th and 20th centuries have changed to allow women to be pastors, though others retained a male presbyterate. Whether man or woman, this person is to be older and experienced in the faith (i.e., an elder), a person who is a decision-maker, and a manager of church affairs.

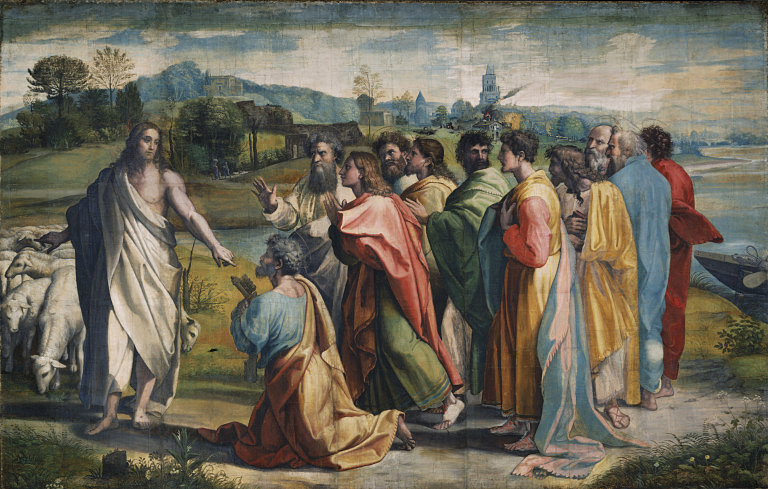
Christ's Charge to Peter by Raphael, 1515. In telling Peter to feed his sheep, Christ appointed him as a pastor.

English-language translations of the New Testament usually render the Greek noun ποιμήν (poimēn) as "shepherd" (18x) and the Greek verb ποιμαίνω (poimainō) as "to herd [a flock], shepherd" (11x). The two words occur a total of 29 times in the New Testament, often referring to Jesus (11x). Most notably in John 10, Jesus called himself the "Good Shepherd" in John 10:11. The same words in the familiar Christmas story (Luke 2) refer to literal shepherds.

In five New Testament passages, though, the words relate to members of the church:

1. John 21:16 - Jesus told Peter: "Feed My sheep"
2. Acts 20:17 - the Apostle Paul summons the elders of the church in Ephesus to give a last discourse to them; in Acts 20:28, he tells them that the Holy Spirit has made them overseers, and they are to feed/tend the church of God.
3. 1 Corinthians 9:7 - Paul says, of himself and the apostles: "who feed/tend a flock, and eateth not of the milk of the flock?"
4. Ephesians 4:11 - Paul wrote "And he gave some, apostles; and some, prophets; and some, evangelists; and some, pastors and teachers;"
5. 1 Peter 5:1-2 - Peter tells the elders among his readers that they are to, "Feed/tend the flock of God which is among you, taking the oversight thereof".

== Historical usage ==
Around 400 AD, Saint Augustine, a prominent African Catholic bishop, described a pastor's job:

Disturbers are to be rebuked, the low-spirited to be encouraged, the infirm to be supported, objectors confuted, the treacherous guarded against, the unskilled taught, the lazy aroused, the contentious restrained, the haughty repressed, litigants pacified, the poor relieved, the oppressed liberated, the good approved, the evil borne with, and all are to be loved.

== Current usage ==
Present-day usage of the word is rooted in the biblical metaphor of shepherding.

=== Catholicism ===
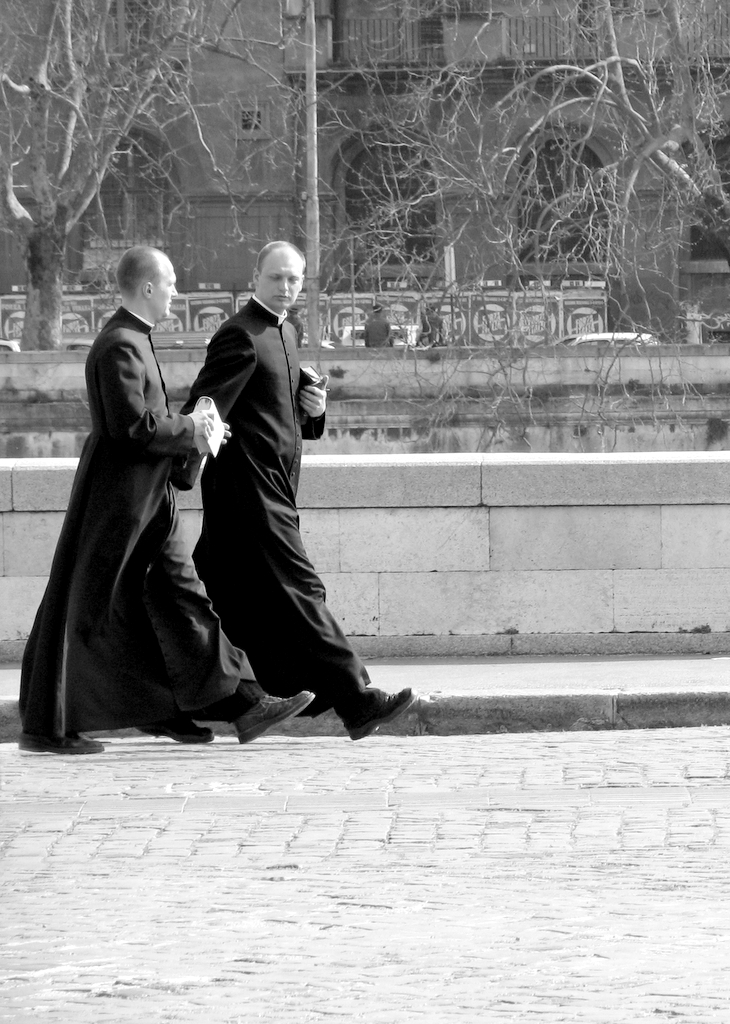
Two Catholic priests in Rome

In the United States and Canada, the term pastor is used by Catholics for what in other English-speaking countries is called a parish priest. The Latin term used in the Code of Canon Law is parochus.

The parish priest is the proper clergyman in charge of the congregation of the parish entrusted to him. He exercises the pastoral care of the community entrusted to him under the authority of the diocesan bishop, whose ministry of Christ he is called to share, so that for this community he may carry out the offices of teaching, sanctifying and ruling with the cooperation of other priests or deacons and with the assistance of lay members of Christ's faithful, in accordance with the law.

A former distinction between "removable" and "irremovable" pastors in Catholic parish appointments was withdrawn as a result of the Second Vatican Council's decision that diocesan bishops needed more effective means of ensuring that parishes were properly staffed for pastoral care.

=== Lutheranism ===
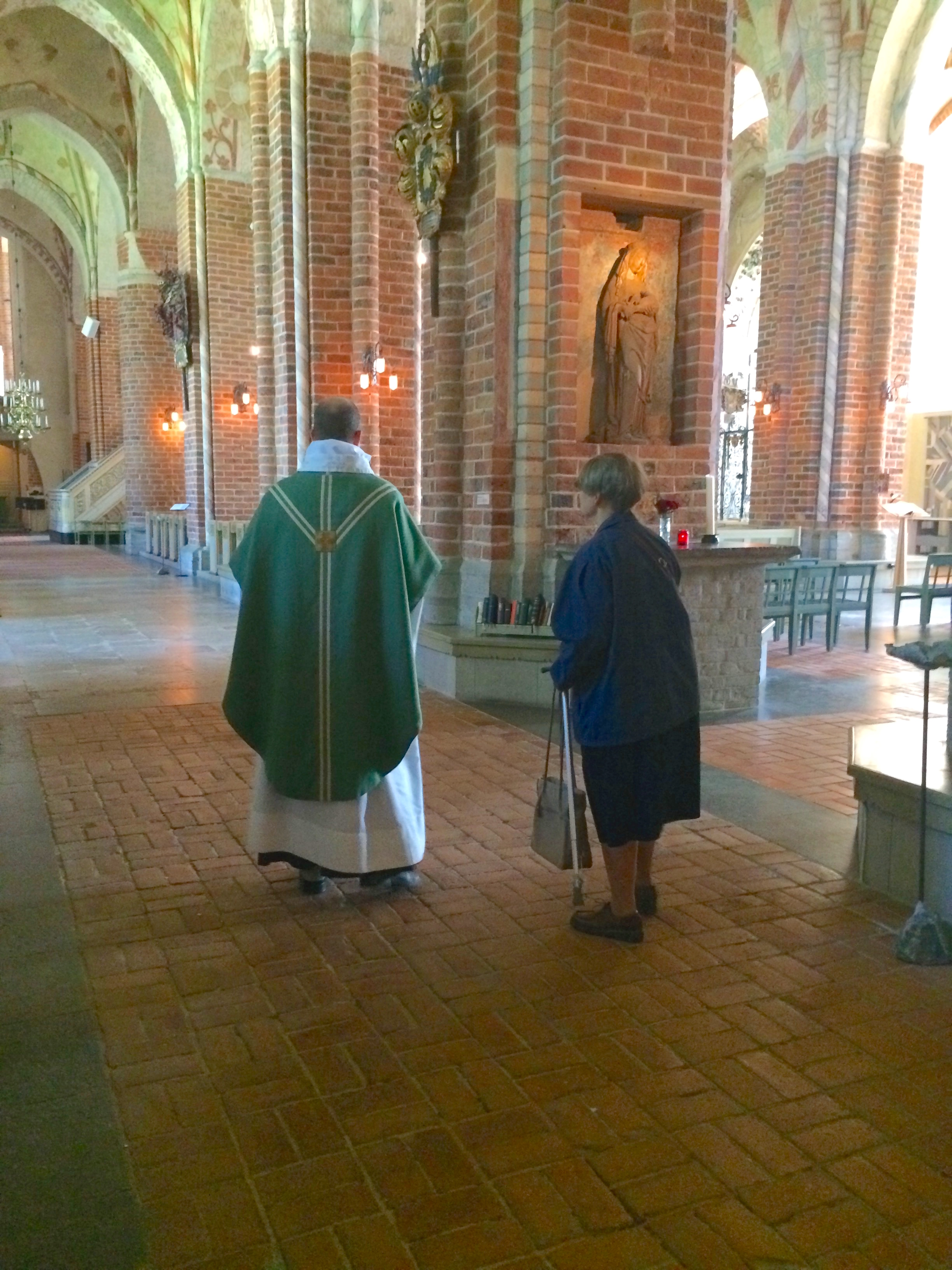
A Lutheran priest of the Church of Sweden prepares for the celebration of Mass in Strängnäs Cathedral.

The Church of Sweden has a threefold ministry of bishop, priest, and deacon, and those ordained to the presbyterate are referred to as priests. In the Evangelical Lutheran Church of Finland, ordained presbyters are referred to by various publications, including Finnish ones, as pastors, or priests. In the United States, denominations like the Lutheran Church–Missouri Synod, use the terms "reverend" and "pastor" interchangeably for ordained members of the clergy, and the Evangelical Lutheran Church in America (ELCA) usually just uses "pastor". On the other hand, the Lutheran Church - International, a Confessional Lutheran denomination of Evangelical Catholic churchmanship, uses the term "priest" for those ordained to the presbyterate, who are addressed as "Father".

=== Anglicanism ===
Ordained presbyters are called priests in the Church of England, as in all other ecclesiastical provinces of the Anglican Communion, and use the title "the Reverend" if they are low church and "Father" or "Mother" if they are high church. Leaders who are not ordained but have a license from their bishop increasingly use the title "pastor", along with office holders who are communicants within the Anglican Communion and participate in lay ministry where a license is not required.

=== Methodism ===
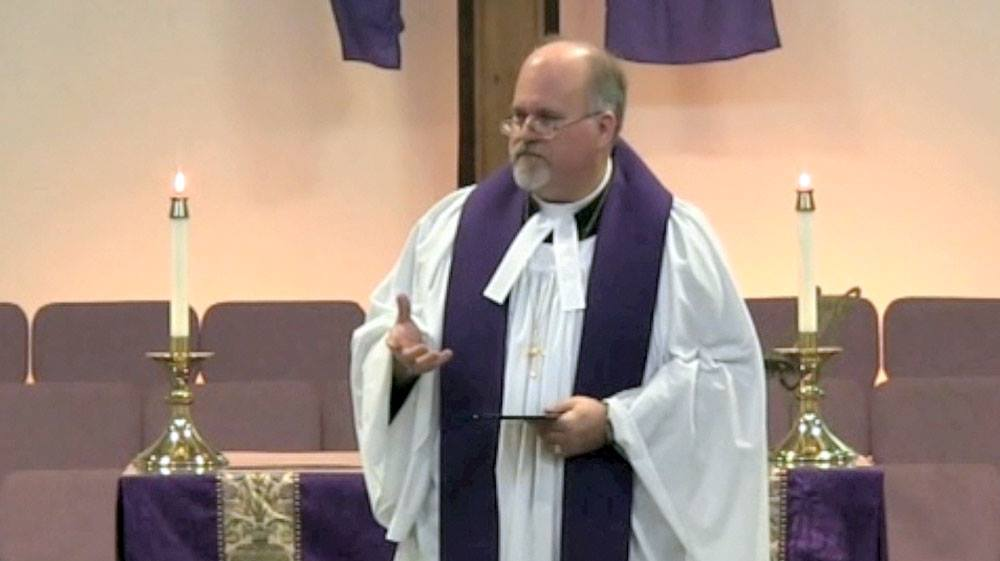
A Methodist pastor wearing a cassock, vested with a surplice and stole, with preaching bands attached to his clerical collar

United Methodists ordain deacons and elders, each of whom can use the title of pastor depending on the context. United Methodists also use the title of pastor for non-ordained clergy who are licensed and appointed to serve a congregation as their pastor or associate pastor, often referred to as licensed local pastors. These pastors may be lay people, seminary students, or seminary graduates in the ordination process and cannot exercise any functions of clergy outside the charge where they are appointed.

=== Reformed ===
The use of the term pastor to refer to the common Protestant title of modern times dates to the days of John Calvin and Huldrych Zwingli. Both men, and other reformers, seem to have revived the term to replace the Roman Catholic priest in the minds of their followers. The pastor was considered to have a role separate from the board of presbyters. A "pastor" may be either ordained or commissioned, depending on the methods used to appoint a person into the role, with either way resulting in the same authority and responsibilities to provide shepherding and grace to a congregation.

=== Baptist ===
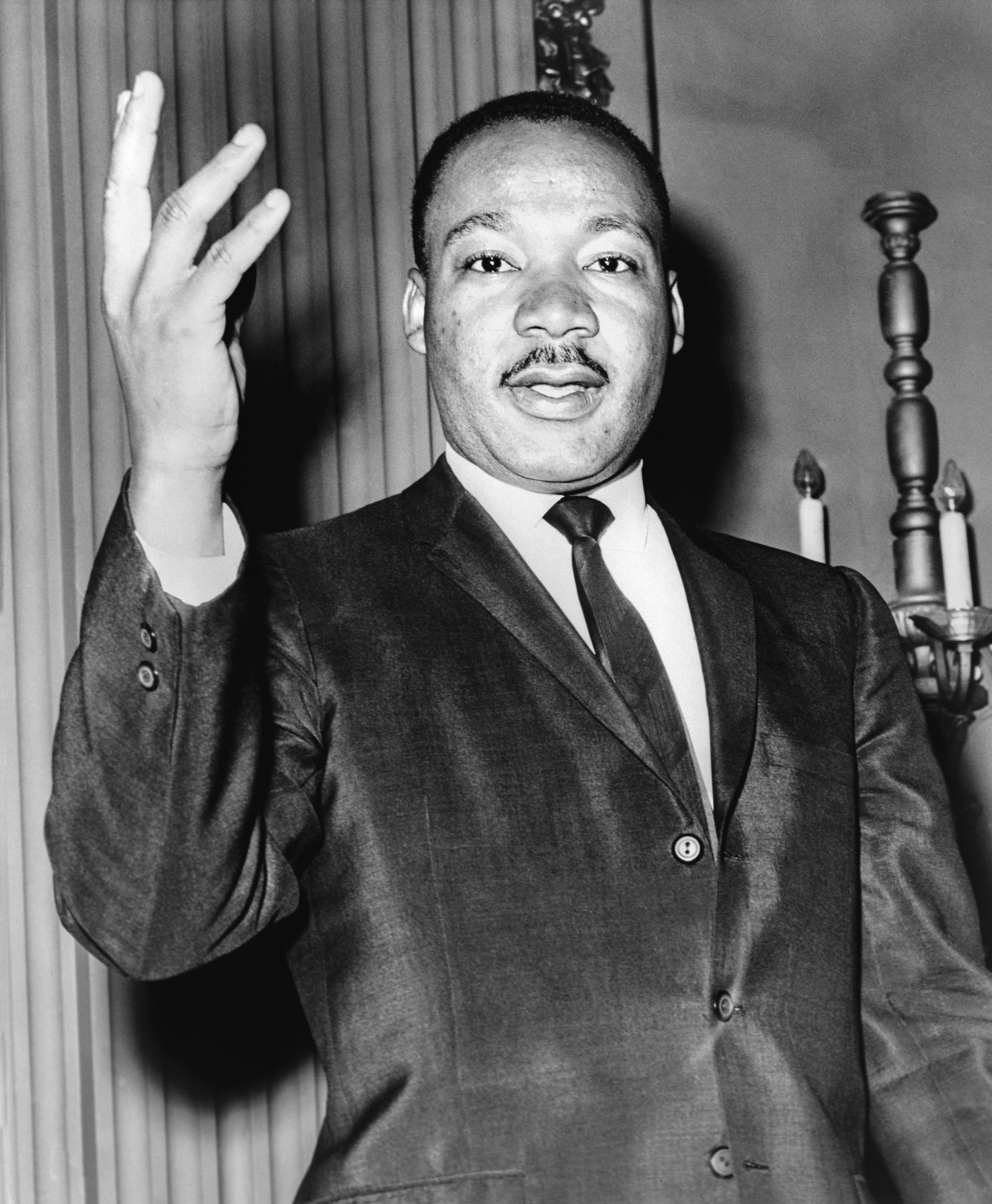
Baptist pastor Martin Luther King Jr.

The term pastor in the majority of Baptist churches is one of two offices within the church, deacon being the other, and is considered synonymous with "elder" or "bishop" (though in Reformed Baptist churches, elders are a separate office).

In larger churches with many staff members, "senior pastor" commonly refers to the person who gives the sermons the majority of the time, with other persons having titles relating to their duties, for example, "worship pastor" for the person leading singing.

=== Restorationist ===
Some groups today view the pastor, bishop, and elder as synonymous terms or offices; many who do are descended from the Restoration Movement in America during the 19th century, such as the Disciples of Christ and the Churches of Christ.

=== Other religions ===
Some other religions have started to use the term pastor for their own ordained leader of a congregation, such as "Buddhist pastor".

== Junior roles ==
An assistant or associate pastor is a person who assists the pastor in a Christian church. The qualifications, responsibilities, and duties vary depending on the church and denomination.

In many churches, an assistant pastor is a pastor-in-training, or are awaiting full ordination. In many instances, they are granted limited powers and authority to act with, or in the absence of, the congregation's pastor. Some churches that have outreach programs, such as hospital visitations, in-home programs, prison ministries, or multiple chapels, will appoint assistant pastors to perform duties while the pastor is busy elsewhere. Some churches use the title brother or ordained brother in place of assistant pastor. In larger Roman Catholic parishes, the duties of an assistant pastor can be broken up into duties performed by deacons and non-ordained lay people.

== Wider uses of the pastoral metaphor in Christianity ==
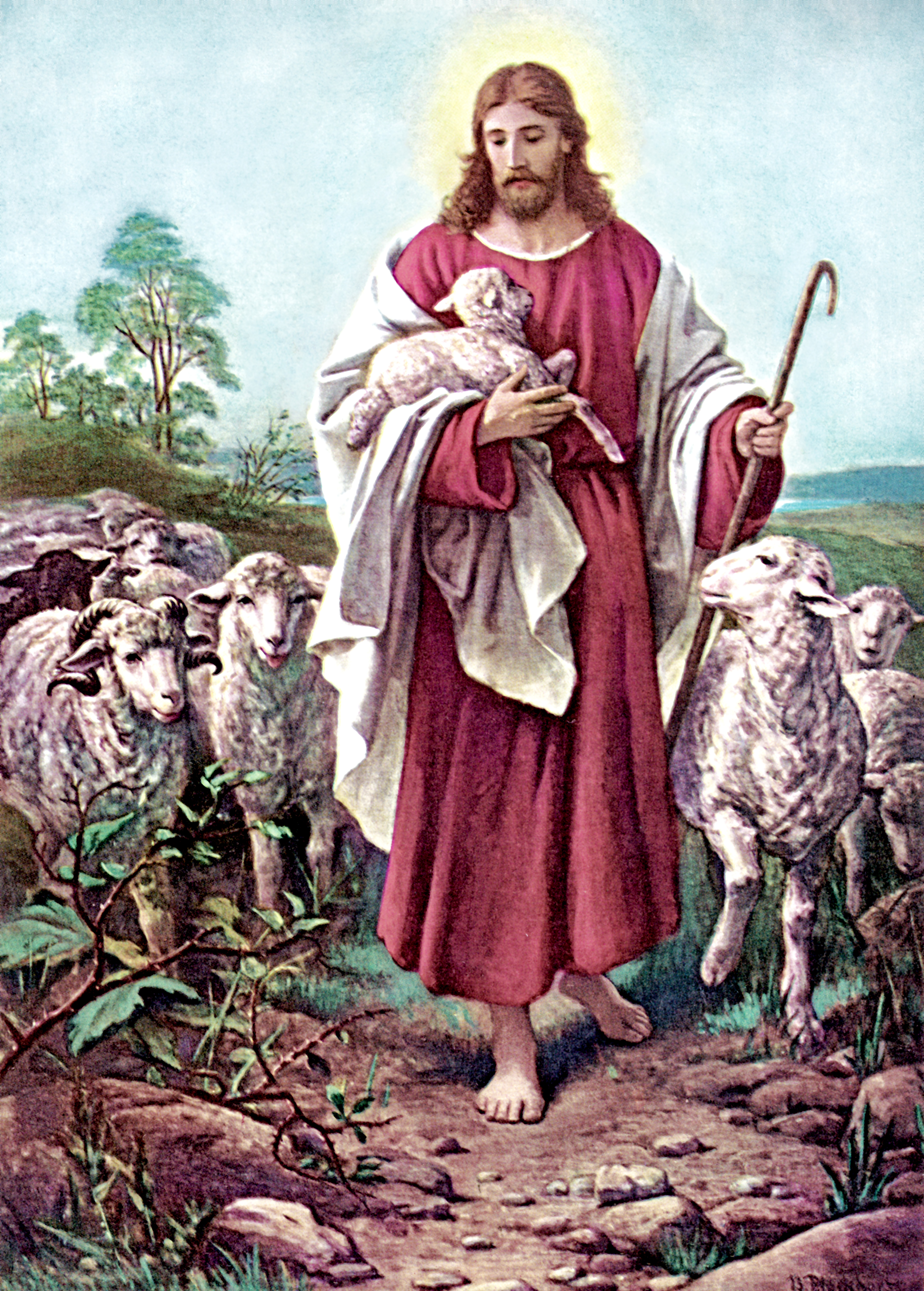
Christ depicted as the "Good Shepherd"

Pastoral imagery and symbolism feature heavily in Christianity and the Bible. Jesus calls himself the "Good Shepherd" in John 10:11, contrasting his role as the Lamb of God.

The term or title of "pastor", used by many Christian denominations, is rooted in the Biblical metaphor of shepherding; pastor in Latin means 'shepherd'. The Hebrew Bible (or Old Testament) uses the Hebrew word רעה (roʿeh), which is used as a noun as in 'shepherd', and as a verb as in 'to tend a flock'. It occurs 173 times in 144 Old Testament verses and relates to the literal feeding of sheep, as in Genesis 29:7. In Jeremiah 23:4, both meanings are used (ro'im is used for 'shepherds' and yir'um for 'shall feed them'): "And I will set up shepherds over them which shall feed them: and they shall fear no more, nor be dismayed, neither shall they be lacking, saith the LORD." (KJV)

A pastoral economic system had great cultural significance for the Jewish people from earliest recorded times: Abraham herded flocks. Throughout the biblical accounts of the Children of Israel, a pastoral lifestyle in the harsh hinterland of the Levant related to the ideal of a society obedient to Yahweh, in contrast to the corruption and idolatry encountered in the "fleshpots of Egypt" (Exodus 16:3), in the lush Canaanite lowlands "flowing with milk and honey" (Exodus 3:8), or in Babylon, the "great city" of Israelite exile. David, a righteous shepherd boy associated with the arid hill country, contrasts with Goliath and Saul, representatives of luxurious urban elites. Thus, New Testament imagery of shepherds and their sheep builds on established cultural and economic distinctions familiar, directly or indirectly, to the Jewish world at the time of the origins of Christianity in the first century CE.

The "pastoral epistles" are a group of three books of the canonical New Testament: the First Epistle to Timothy (1 Timothy), the Second Epistle to Timothy (2 Timothy), and the Epistle to Titus. They are presented as letters from Paul the Apostle to Timothy and to Titus. They are generally discussed as a group (sometimes with the addition of the Epistle to Philemon) and are given the title "pastoral" because they are addressed to individuals with pastoral oversight of churches and discuss issues of Christian living, doctrine, and leadership. A pastoral letter, often called simply a pastoral, is an open letter addressed by a bishop to the clergy or laity of a diocese or to both, containing general admonition, instruction, consolation, or directions for behavior in particular circumstances. In most episcopal church bodies, clerics are often required to read out pastoral letters of superior bishops to their congregations. The final constitutional document issued by the Second Vatican Council in 1965, Gaudium et spes, is described as a "pastoral constitution".

== See also ==
- Clergy
- Dominie
- Ecclesiastical titles and styles
- Elder
- Herr Pastor
- Instituted minister
- Minister of religion
- Murshid
- Pastoral care
- Pastoral counseling
- Pounding
- Preacher
- Priest
- Rabbi
- Spiritual gift

== Other sources ==
- Bercot, David W. (1999). Will The Real Heretics Please Stand Up. Scroll Publishing. ISBN 0-924722-00-2.
- Dowly, Tim, ed. (1977). The History of Christianity. Lion Publishing. ISBN 0-7459-1625-2.
