= Ephes Dammim =

Ephes Dammim, meaning "border of blood," (1 Samuel 17:1) or Pas Dammim (1 Chronicles 11:13) is a biblical place name.

Mentioned in the Bible, a place in the tribe of Judah where the Philistines camped when David fought with Goliath (1 Samuel 17:1). Probably so called as having been the scene of frequent bloody conflicts between Israel and the Philistines. Its location has not been identified with any certainty.
