= Herr Pastor =

Herr Pastor is a stereotypical authoritarian pastor in an ethnic German congregation. Herr Pastor, literally "Mister Pastor" in German, was a title often used even in English-speaking congregations with German heritage, such as Lutheran or Evangelical and Reformed Church.

The leadership style of the Herr Pastor was, to some degree, a benevolent dictatorship in the sense that the Herr Pastor held supreme decision-making authority. Depictions of the Herr Pastor often characterise him as humorless.

== Sources ==
- https://web.archive.org/web/20060629035322/http://www.religion-online.org/showarticle.asp?title=1229
