= 1 Samuel 18 =

First Book of Samuel chapter

- ← chapter 17 chapter 19 →
- The pages containing the Books of Samuel (1 & 2 Samuel) in Leningrad Codex (1008 CE).
- Book: First book of Samuel
- Hebrew Bible part: Nevi'im
- Order in the Hebrew part: 3
- Category: Former Prophets
- Christian Bible part: Old Testament
- Order in the Christian part: 9

1 Samuel 18 is the eighteenth chapter of the First Book of Samuel in the Old Testament of the Christian Bible or the first part of the Books of Samuel in the Hebrew Bible. According to Jewish tradition, the book was attributed to the prophet Samuel, with additions by the prophets Gad and Nathan, but modern scholars view it as a composition of a number of independent texts composed during c. 630 – c. 540 BCE. This chapter contains David's interaction with Saul and his children, in particular Jonathan and Michal. This is within a section comprising 1 Samuel 16 to 2 Samuel 5, which records the rise of David as the king of Israel.

== Text ==
This chapter was originally written in the Hebrew language. It is divided into 30 verses.

=== Textual witnesses ===
Some early manuscripts containing the text of this chapter in Hebrew are of the Masoretic Text tradition, which includes the Codex Cairensis (895), Aleppo Codex (10th century), and Codex Leningradensis (1008). Fragments containing parts of this chapter in Hebrew were found among the Dead Sea Scrolls including 1Q7 (1QSam; 50 BCE) with extant verses 17–18 and 4Q51 (4QSam^{a}; 100–50 BCE) with extant verses 4–5.

Extant ancient manuscripts of a translation into Koine Greek known as the Septuagint (originally was made in the last few centuries BCE) include Codex Vaticanus (B; $\mathfrak{G}$^{B}; 4th century) and Codex Alexandrinus (A; $\mathfrak{G}$^{A}; 5th century). (Note: The whole book of 1 Samuel is missing from the extant Codex Sinaiticus.)

== Analysis ==
Verses 1–5 of this chapter are a fitting conclusion to the account in 1 Samuel 17, as David was retained in the court (verse 2), elevated for military action (verse 5), and received general acclaim from the common people and the courtiers. On top of that, Jonathan, Saul's oldest son, was attached to David in covenantal friendship, confirmed by Jonathan's handing over his clothes and armor to David (verse 4), symbolically transferring to David the right of succession and making David heir-apparent. On the other hand, Saul became jealous of David, and their relationship developed into one of "respect and hatred, recognition and desire to kill"—a mixed attitude which was especially triggered when Saul heard the couplet (verse 7) giving the clear message that David would become king. Saul feared David (verses 12, 15, & 29) as Saul acknowledged that God was with David, whereas God had abandoned Saul (verse 12). Since then, a prominent theme appears in which Saul was thwarted in all his plans to hurt David, while for David each attempt became an opportunity to further his triumph (verses 14, 30).

== Saul fears David (18:1–16) ==
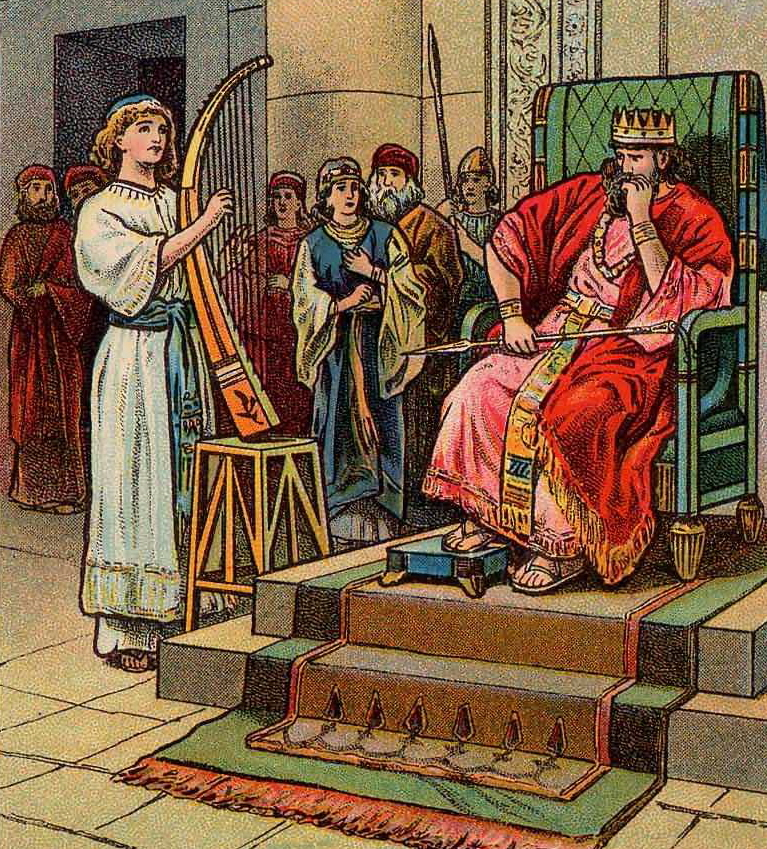
"Saul Tries To Kill David" (1 Samuel 18:5-16); illustration from a Bible card published by the Providence Lithograph Company (1902).

The last chapter ends with David talking to Saul and Abner, whereas at the beginning of this chapter it was clear that Jonathan, Saul's crown prince, was also present at the event, and once he had a chance to talk to David, he immediately befriended David. Jonathan loved David (verse 1), similar to how Saul, his father, had loved David (1 Samuel 16:21), and the experiences of fighting the Philistines against great odds led to a revelation that Jonathan and David shared a kindred spirit.

After defeating Goliath, David was recognized as a brave man whom Saul wanted to keep in his service (1 Samuel 14:52). In later battles, David proved himself even more worthy, and the women who sang to celebrate these victories attributed more kills to David than to Saul. Saul interpreted the supposedly non-partisan victory song in the worst possible sense and became suspicious that David would take over his throne (verse 9). The next day, Saul was tormented by an "evil spirit of God", and he twice attempted to pin David to the wall with his spear, but David, who was playing music for Saul, managed to escape both times. Next, Saul moved David from the position of the king's musician to be a commander of a thousand men and ordered him to face the Philistines, hoping that David would be killed by the enemies. But this backfired when David achieved great victories in battle, and all Israel began to love him (18:16).

=== Verse 3 ===
Then Jonathan and David made a covenant, because he loved him as his own soul.

- "A covenant": that is, "solemnly entered into an agreement of perpetual friendship".
- "He loved him as his own soul": or could be rendered as "each loved the other as his own soul".

== David marries Michal (18:17–30) ==
Saul's fear of David increased and affected his integrity as king: he took back his promise to give his first daughter, Merab, as David's wife, only to offer David his second daughter with additional conditions in order to get David killed by the Philistines (verse 25). David responded by saying that he was a "poor man": likely an allusion to another broken promise of Saul that the killer of Goliath would get riches from the king. (David confirmed the reward promise multiple times with different people, as documented in 1 Samuel 17:25, 27, & 30). Saul misinterpreted David's response as a concern about not being able to pay the dowry for the marriage, so he announced a bride-price of a hundred Philistine foreskins. David decided to accept the challenge, but perhaps due to Saul's "double-dealing ways," David presented double the amount of foreskins and had the "full numbers" counted before Saul (verse 27), so Saul had to keep his word to give Michal, his daughter, to David as wife. Having David as his son-in-law made Saul fear David even more, whereas it tremendously increased David's fame (verse 29–30).

=== Verse 20 ===
And Michal Saul's daughter loved David: and they told Saul, and the thing pleased him.

- "Michal Saul's daughter loved David" (repeated in verse 28): the only time a woman is described as loving a man in the Bible.

== See also ==
- Adriel the Meholathite
- Demon
- Merab
- Michal
- Tabret
- Tribe of Judah
- Related Bible parts: 1 Samuel 16, 1 Samuel 17

== Sources ==
=== Commentaries on Samuel ===
- Auld, Graeme (2003). "1 & 2 Samuel". In James D. G. Dunn and John William Rogerson (ed.). Eerdmans Commentary on the Bible. Eerdmans. ISBN 9780802837110.
- Bergen, David T. (1996). 1, 2 Samuel. B&H Publishing Group. ISBN 9780805401073.
- Chapman, Stephen B. (2016). 1 Samuel as Christian Scripture: A Theological Commentary. Wm. B. Eerdmans Publishing Company. ISBN 978-1467445160.
- Evans, Paul (2018). Longman, Tremper (ed.). 1-2 Samuel. The Story of God Bible Commentary. Zondervan Academic. ISBN 978-0310490944.
- Gordon, Robert (1986). I & II Samuel, A Commentary. Paternoster Press. ISBN 9780310230229.
- Hertzberg, Hans Wilhelm (1964). I & II Samuel, A Commentary (trans. from German 2nd edition 1960 ed.). Westminster John Knox Press. p. 19. ISBN 978-0664223182.
- Tsumura, David Toshio (2007). The First Book of Samuel. Eerdmans. ISBN 9780802823595.

=== General ===
- Breytenbach, Andries (2000). "Who Is Behind The Samuel Narrative?". In Johannes Cornelis de Moor and H.F. Van Rooy (ed.). Past, Present, Future: the Deuteronomistic History and the Prophets. Brill. ISBN 9789004118713.
- Coogan, Michael David (2007). Coogan, Michael David; Brettler, Marc Zvi; Newsom, Carol Ann; Perkins, Pheme (eds.). The New Oxford Annotated Bible with the Apocryphal/Deuterocanonical Books: New Revised Standard Version, Issue 48 (Augmented 3rd ed.). Oxford University Press. ISBN 978-0195288810.
- Fitzmyer, Joseph A. (2008). A Guide to the Dead Sea Scrolls and Related Literature. Grand Rapids, MI: William B. Eerdmans Publishing Company. ISBN 9780802862419.
- Halley, Henry H. (1965). Halley's Bible Handbook: an abbreviated Bible commentary (24th (revised) ed.). Zondervan Publishing House. ISBN 0-310-25720-4.
- Hayes, Christine (2015). Introduction to the Bible. Yale University Press. ISBN 978-0300188271.
- Jones, Gwilym H. (2007). "12. 1 and 2 Samuel". In Barton, John; Muddiman, John (eds.). The Oxford Bible Commentary (first (paperback) ed.). Oxford University Press. pp. 196–232. ISBN 978-0199277186.
- Klein, R.W. (2003). "Samuel, books of". In Bromiley, Geoffrey W (ed.). The International Standard Bible Encyclopedia. Eerdmans. ISBN 9780802837844.
- Knight, Douglas A (1995). "Chapter 4 Deuteronomy and the Deuteronomists". In James Luther Mays, David L. Petersen and Kent Harold Richards (ed.). Old Testament Interpretation. T&T Clark. ISBN 9780567292896.
- Ulrich, Eugene, ed. (2010). The Biblical Qumran Scrolls: Transcriptions and Textual Variants. Brill.
- Würthwein, Ernst (1995). The Text of the Old Testament. Translated by Rhodes, Erroll F. Grand Rapids, MI: Wm. B. Eerdmans. ISBN 0-8028-0788-7.
