= Genesis 38 =

Genesis 38 may refer to:

- Vayeshev, the Jewish parashah which includes chapter 38 of the Book of Genesis
- Tamar, whose story recounting her relationship with Judah is told in this chapter
