= Genesis 36 =

Genesis 36 may refer to:

- Vayishlach, the Jewish parashah which includes chapter 36 of the Book of Genesis
- Esau, whose family and descendants are recorded in this chapter
