= 1 Samuel 17 =

First Book of Samuel chapter

- ← chapter 16 chapter 18 →
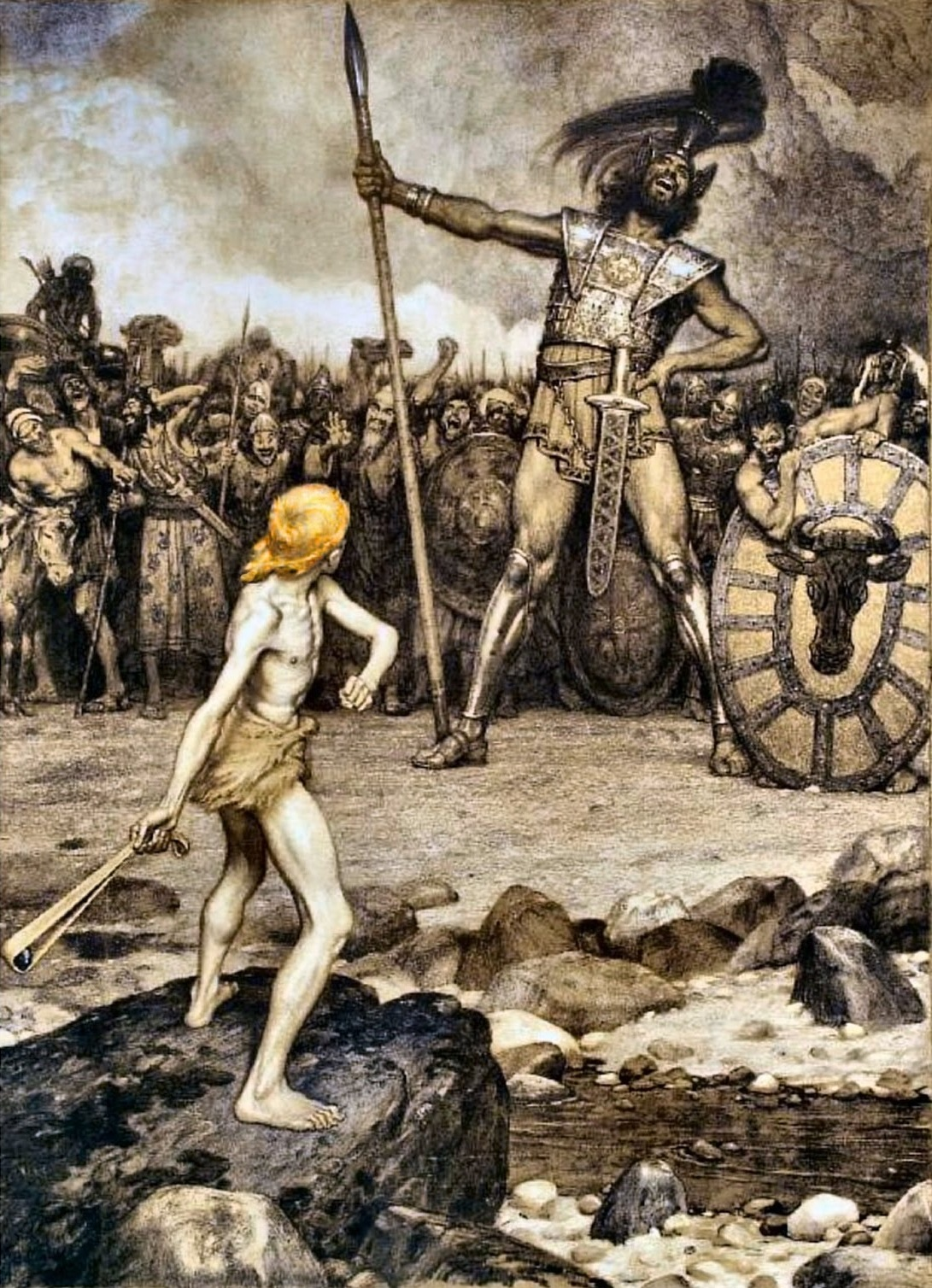
- "David and Goliath" (1888), by Osmar Schindler (1869-1927)
- Book: First book of Samuel
- Hebrew Bible part: Nevi'im
- Order in the Hebrew part: 3
- Category: Former Prophets
- Christian Bible part: Old Testament
- Order in the Christian part: 9

1 Samuel 17 is the seventeenth chapter of the First Book of Samuel in the Old Testament of the Christian Bible or the first part of the Books of Samuel in the Hebrew Bible. According to Jewish tradition the book was attributed to the prophet Samuel, with additions by the prophets Gad and Nathan, but modern scholars view it as a composition of a number of independent texts of various ages from c. 630–540 BCE. This chapter contains the battle of David with Goliath, the Philistine. This is within a section comprising 1 Samuel 16 to 2 Samuel 5 which records the rise of David as the king of Israel.

== Text ==
This chapter was originally written in the Hebrew language. It is divided into 58 verses.

=== Textual witnesses ===
Some early manuscripts containing the text of this chapter in Hebrew are of the Masoretic Text tradition, which includes the Codex Cairensis (895), Aleppo Codex (10th century), and Codex Leningradensis (1008). Fragments containing parts of this chapter in Hebrew were found among the Dead Sea Scrolls including 4Q51 (4QSam^{a}; 100–50 BCE) with extant verses 3–8, 40–41.

Extant ancient manuscripts of a translation into Koine Greek known as the Septuagint (originally was made in the last few centuries BCE) include Codex Vaticanus (B; $\mathfrak{G}$^{B}; 4th century) and Codex Alexandrinus (A; $\mathfrak{G}$^{A}; 5th century). (Note: The whole book of 1 Samuel is missing from the extant Codex Sinaiticus.) The text in the Codex Vaticanus is notably shorter than the others, consisting only of verses 1–11, 32–40, 42–48a, 49, 51–54.

== Places ==
Places mentioned in this chapter

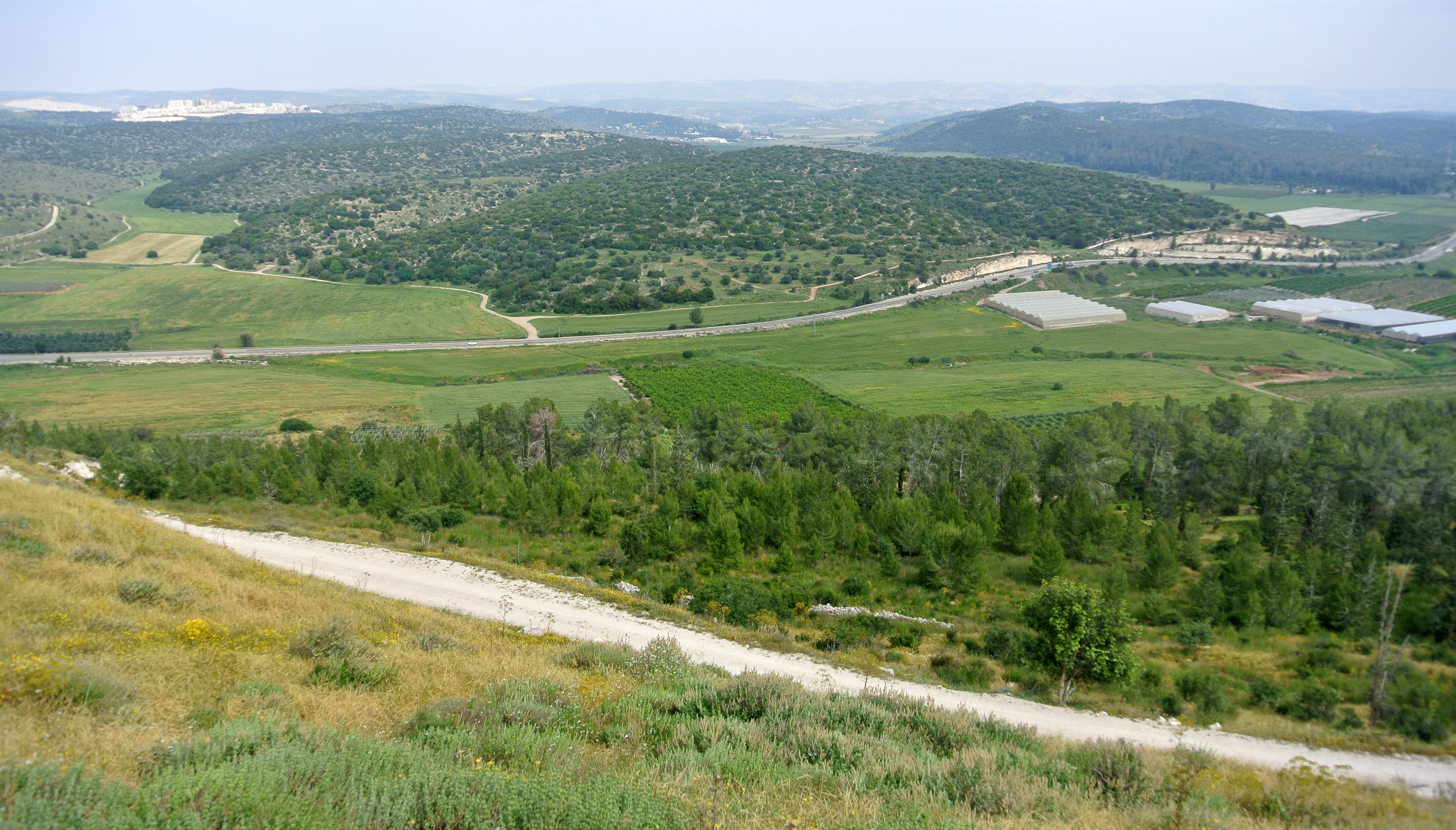
Valley of Elah, viewed from the top of Tel Azeka (2014).

- Azekah
- Bethlehem-Judah
- Ephesdammim
- Ekron
- Gath
- Ramah
- Shaaraim
- Shochoh
- Valley of Elah

== Analysis ==
The section comprising 1 Samuel 16 to 2 Samuel 5 is known as the "History of David's Rise", with David as the central character, within which 1 Samuel 16:1 to 2 Samuel 1:27 form an independent unit with a central theme of "the decline of Saul and the rise of David". This narrative provides the test of David's suitability to the throne, in contrast to the testing of Jonathan at Michmash (1 Samuel 14:13–14). It was emphasized that David did not enter into battle with Goliath because of 'arrogance or a spirit of adventure', but because he followed God's plan. The portrayal of David as a shepherd in this narrative had 'royal' connotations (cf Psalm 78:70–72 and the prophecies of Jeremiah, Ezekiel, and Zechariah).

== The challenge of Goliath, the Philistine (17:1–11) ==
After an unknown period of time, the Philistines again started a military action against Israel, assembling their army near Sochoh, a strategic passage between the Philistine and Israel territories. Saul assembled the Israel army at the opposite side of the Elah valley, anticipating a battle. However, this time, a gigantic man, Goliath, stepped up out of the Philistines, a seasoned veteran, wearing the most advanced weapons, challenging anyone among the Israel army for one-on-one combat, instead of thousands soldiers battling, to decide the outcome – winner takes all. In his challenge, Goliath explicitly called for Saul ("are you not the servants of Saul"; verse 8) perhaps in reference to Saul being the tallest among the Israelites (1 Samuel 10:23), but Saul and all Israel soldiers were too afraid to accept the challenge.

=== Verse 1 ===
Now the Philistines gathered their armies together to battle, and were gathered at Sochoh, which belongs to Judah; they encamped between Sochoh and Azekah, in Ephes Dammim.

The verse detailed the scene of David's memorable battle with Goliath with great exactness. The Philistines and Israel army camped on opposite sides of the wide valley of Elah (verse 2) to their rendezvous at Sochoh, and the Philistines pitched their camp in Ephes-dammim.

- "Sochoh" (also written as "Shochoh, Sokho"): identified with the modern "Shuweikeh", about 16 miles southwest of Jerusalem on the road to Gaza.
- "Azekah" mentioned in Joshua 10:10 in relation to the rout of the Philistines in the battle of Beth-horon.
- "Ephes-dammim": meaning "boundary of blood" (cf. Ha-Pas Dammim in 1 Chronicles 11:13), identified with modern Beit Fased, or 'House of Bleeding,' near Sochoh. The name was probably given as the scene of frequent battles between the Israelites and the Philistines.

=== Verse 2 ===
And Saul and the men of Israel were gathered together, and they encamped in the Valley of Elah, and drew up in battle array against the Philistines.

- "Valley of Elah": now Wady-es-Sunt, running in a northwest direction from the hills of Judah near Hebron passing Gath (cf. 1 Samuel 5:8) to the sea near Ashdod. The ancient name "Elah" was taken from the Terebinth, the largest tree specimen in Palestine still standing in the vicinity, whereas the modern name "es-Sunt" is from the acacias which are scattered in the valley.

=== Verse 4 ===
And there came out from the camp of the Philistines a champion named Goliath of Gath, whose height was six cubits and a span.

- "Goliath": a Philistine warrior from Gath. During excavations by Israel's Bar-Ilan University in the location of ancient Gath (now Tell es-Safi) a potsherd was discovered, reliably dated to between the tenth to mid ninth centuries BC, with inscription of two names 'LWT and WLT, which were etymologically related to the name Goliath (גלית, GLYT), so demonstrating that Goliath's name fits with the context of late tenth/early ninth century BCE Philistine culture, as well as could be linked with the Lydian king Alyattes, which also fits the Philistine context. A similar name, Uliat, is also attested in Carian inscriptions.
- "Six cubits and a span" following Masoretic Text, approximately 9 ft. 9 in., but some manuscripts including 4QSam^{a} and Septuagint have 'four cubits and a span' (about 6 ft. 9 in.), as in the table below. A "cubit" (Hebrew: ʼammah) is about 18 inches or 45 centimeters, (in the ancient world usually varies from seventeen to eighteen inches), but there were longer and shorter cubits, as in Babylon and Egypt, measured 20.65 and 17.6 inches, respectively.

Textual witnesses	Source	Language	Date	Height (original)	Height (meter)	Height (foot + inch)
Dead Sea Scrolls; 4QSam^{a}	Jewish	Hebrew	50 BCE	4 cubits and a span	2	6 ft. 9 in.
Josephus; Antiquities 6.171	Jewish	Greek	80 CE	4 cubits and a span	2	6 ft. 9 in.
Symmachus (cited by Origen in 3rd century CE)	Jewish	Greek	~ 200 CE	6 cubits and a span	3	9 ft. 9 in.
Origen; Hexapla	Christian	Greek	~250 CE	6 cubits and a span	3	9 ft. 9 in.
Lucian Greek recension	Christian	Greek	200-300 CE	4 cubits and a span	2	6 ft. 9 in.
Codex Vaticanus (LXX)	Christian	Greek	300-400 CE	4 cubits and a span	2	6 ft. 9 in.
Codex Alexandrinus (LXX)	Christian	Greek	400-500 CE	4 cubits and a span	2	6 ft. 9 in.
Vulgate (Jerome)	Christian	Latin	400 CE	6 cubits and a span	3	9 ft. 9 in.
Codex Venetus	Christian	Greek	700-800 CE	5 cubits and a span	2.5	8 ft. 3 in.
Aleppo Codex (Masoretic Text)	Jewish	Hebrew	935 CE	6 cubits and a span	3	9 ft. 9 in.
Leningrad Codex (Masoretic Text)	Jewish	Hebrew	1010 CE	6 cubits and a span	3	9 ft. 9 in.

Most of the extant Hebrew manuscripts are based on Masoretic Text (MT), but older manuscripts, such as from Symmachus, a Jewish translator of Hebrew texts to Greek in 200s CE for the Jewish community in Caesarea, cited by Origen in the fourth column of Hexapla and assumed to be "proto-MT" (Vorlage to the MT), as well as Greek version of Origen in the fifth column of Hexapla have "6 cubits and a span". Billington suggests that the "4 cubits and a span" in the Septuagint and 4QSam^{a} could be a conversion from MT's data of common cubits (1 cubit ≈ 18 inches) into a measurement using royal Egyptian cubits (1 cubit ≈ 20.65 inches).

Average height of men at the end of first century BCE in the Middle East and Mediterranean area was estimated based on the skeletons in some tombs to be about 3.5 cubits (about 150 cm or 5 ft.) to about 175 cm. Whether it was 2 or 3 meters, the mention of Goliath's height certainly played a role for the Israelites to fear him, although in the whole chapter Goliath was never referred to as a "giant". However, Saul, being a tall person himself (about 6 feet or 6 feet 6 inches), was more concerned about Goliath's extensive military training (verse 33: "he [Goliath] has been a fighting man since his youth"; Saul never mentioned about Goliath's height). Therefore, the emphasis of mentioning Goliath's height in the narrative is that Saul, possessing unique height, weapons and armor among the Israelites, should be the logical choice to fight Goliath, but he was cowering in fear instead of delivering Israel.

=== Verse 5 ===
And he had an helmet of brass upon his head, and he was armed with a coat of mail; and the weight of the coat was five thousand shekels of brass.

- "Armed": that is, "clothed with scaled body armor". The Hebrew terms for "helmet" (ko'ba), "armed" ("clothed", "put on"; labash) and "coat" ("breastplate"; shiryon) are also found in Isaiah 59:17.
- "Coat of mail": or "breastplate of scales", a kind of shirt, protecting the back as well as the breast, made of bronze scales arranged like those of a fish, probably similar to the corselet of Ramesses III (now in the British Museum).
- "Five thousand shekels of brass": about 125 pounds (57 kg) or probably 157 pounds avoirdupois (cf. Exodus 38:29). It is very likely that Goliath's brass coat may have been 'preserved as a trophy' (like his sword), so the weight of it could be ascertained.

== David's entrance into the battleground (17:12–30) ==
The narrative changes from the battleground to the hometown of David with specific information that Jesse, David's father, did not participate in the war because he was very old, but his three oldest sons were in the battlefield with Saul. While Saul was with his army, David was apparently excused to go home from his service to provide music for the king, so David was back tending his family's sheep. Forty days had passed since the army was assembled and Goliath first came out to challenge the Israelites. Jesse became worried about his sons, so he decided to send David to the front lines to get the news of their wellbeing. After arranging interim care for his flock, David went to the army campsite, bringing bread for his siblings and cheese for their commander. Right at the time David found his brothers, he heard Goliath's challenge and became angry at the insults to his God, a reaction that set him apart from all other Israelites in that place. David regarded Goliath's defying "the armies of Israel" (17:10) as nothing less than defying "the armies of the living God" (17:26). Then, David heard about the reward promised by Saul to the one who could defeat Goliath (verse 25), and he kept inquiring of some people to make sure this information was true (verses 26, 27, 30), even after Eliab, his eldest brother, wrongly accused David as just wanting to watch the battle. It could be argued that David's multiple inquiries—each time resulting in the same answer—were actually intended to 'get it on record' with those people as his witnesses for the reward he would get when he succeeded in winning the combat.

=== Verse 25 ===
And the men of Israel said, "Have you seen this man who has come up? Surely he has come up to defy Israel. And the king will enrich the man who kills him with great riches and will give him his daughter and make his father's house free in Israel."

- "The king will enrich the man": This indicates that many years must have passed before Saul could establish a wealth from the contributions of his people, since the time when Jesse sent the king a few loaves of bread, a skin of wine and a young sheep (1 Samuel 16:20). Poole sees this as the effect and sign of the departure of God's spirit from Saul, that Saul in distress did not seek the counsel of God, but expected relief from men only.
- "Will give him his daughter": like Caleb promised to give daughter in marriage to the man who could take Kirjathsepher (Joshua 15:16; Judges 1:12), but later Saul procrastinated to fulfill this promise to David and even imposed further conditions (1 Samuel 18:17ff).
- "Make his father's house free": may refer to the contributions levied from all the households in Israel for the support of the king and his court, such as spoken in 1 Samuel 8:11–17 (NET Bible: "make his father's house exempt from tax obligations").

== David and Saul (17:31–39) ==
When the news of David inquiring about the reward reached Saul, the king summoned David, but showed his objection to David's appearance as a youth to fight Goliath, who was a "warrior" (Hebrew: 'ish milhamah) 'since his youth'. Saul apparently ignored the words of his attendants in the previous chapter, that David was a "brave man" and a "warrior" (Hebrew: 'ish milhamah; 1 Samuel 16:18). To counter Saul's objection, David spoke about his victories against lions and bears in close combat, without mentioning his sling, because a battle against Goliath was supposed to be a "single-armed infantry combat". David's words convinced Saul, who declared "YHWH be with" David (the same words Saul's servants said about David in 16:18).

Saul wanted to lend his personal armor to dress David for battle, hoping that in a victory he could claim some responsibility, but after trying them on, David declined to use it because he was not used to dressing like that and, as later was shown, his battle plan would not require the armor.

== Battle of David and Goliath (17:40–54) ==
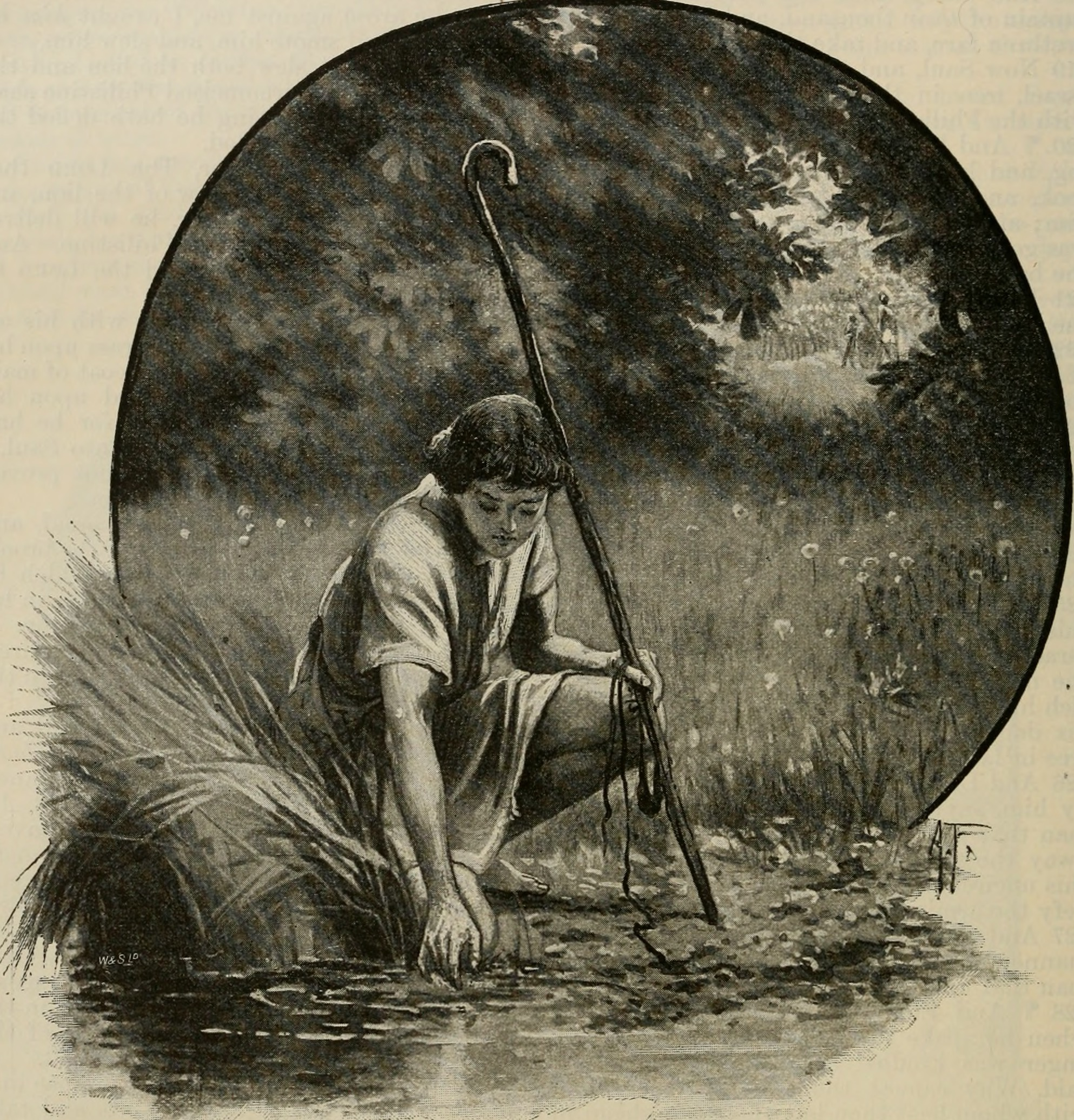
David chose five smooth stones out of the brook. The art Bible, comprising the Old and new Testaments: with numerous illustrations. London: G. Newnes. 1896.

Among the three basic divisions of army in ancient warfare, "infantry" (soldiers with swords and armor) in formation could take out "cavalry" (soldiers on horses or chariots) with pikes, cavalry could take out "artillery" (archers and slingers) by their speed to close in the distance, whereas artillery could take out slow-moving infantry from afar, not unlike the game of 'rock-paper-scissors', so here David chose to be a projectile slinger against Goliath who was an infantry unit.

David approached Goliath in the battlefield with a staff in one hand, five smooth stones freshly picked out of a stream inside his 'shepherd bag', and his sling in his 'other hand' (17:40). The staff could be a successful distraction from his sling, because Goliath only noticed the staff when he mocked David for approaching him with "sticks" (17:43). Not only was David praised for being handsome and brave, but Saul's servants also recognized David's rhetorical skill (16:18), which he showed at this time with theological clarity and power to answer Goliath's cursing by his gods. David was confident that Goliath's superior weapons (sword, spear, javelin: 17:45) would be no match to YHWH, which would prove to "all nations that there is a God in Israel" (17:46) and would give all Philistines into Israel's hands. In contrast to Israel rejecting God by requesting to be led by a king "like all other nations" (1 Samuel 8:5), David declared that the battle was YHWH's, not the army's, not the kings', bringing back YHWH as the leader of His people. At David's words, Goliath made a move toward David, but with his heavy metal armor which weights hundreds of pounds, he could not match David's quicker movement with much less armor, and when David was fast approaching with a sling on his hand, not planning to use his staff at all, it became clearer that the 'rock beats scissors' (artillery beats infantry) strategy would make David no longer an underdog. David deftly shot at Goliath's forehead, which was not covered by his helmet, with the slinged stone using a tremendous force, so the stone 'sank' into Goliath's head and the giant 'fell face first to the ground' (17:49). Not taking any chances that Goliath would wake up again soon, David took out Goliath's own sword and used it to cut off its owner's head. Seeing this, all Philistines fled, pursued by the Israelites, whereas David took Goliath's weapons as victor's spoils into 'his tent' and even already planned to bring Goliath's head to "Jerusalem" (17:54; the latter would be in the future, because at that time Jerusalem was still occupied by the Jebusites; cf. 2 Samuel 5:5–9).

=== Verse 49 ===
Then David put his hand in his bag and took out a stone; and he slung it and struck the Philistine in his forehead, so that the stone sank into his forehead, and he fell on his face to the earth.

- "Struck... in his forehead": The deadly accuracy of slingers is attested by ancient historians, such as the Greek writer Thucydides, in his work The Peloponnesian War, stating that the Athens' infantry was decimated in the mountains by slingers (in a failed attempt to take Sicily), and in Judges 20:16 that mentions seven hundred slingers of the tribe of Benjamin, "each of whom could sling a stone at a hair and not miss".

=== Verse 52 ===
Now the men of Israel and Judah arose and shouted, and pursued the Philistines as far as the entrance of the valley and to the gates of Ekron. And the wounded of the Philistines fell along the road to Shaaraim, even as far as Gath and Ekron.

- "To the valley": or "to a valley"; the Greek Septuagint renders "to Gath" probably from a Hebrew text that reads gath, instead of gai ("a valley"), while Gath is mentioned in the next sentence. The Latin Vulgate has "valley", whereas the Syriac version understands it as 'the mouth of the valley of Elah'.
- "The wounded of the Philistines": Josephus wrote that thirty thousand Philistines were killed with twice as many wounded.
- "Shaaraim" was a town assigned to Judah (Joshua 15:36) in the Shephelah, but was then occupied by the Philistines, now identified with "Tell Kefr Zakariya", a 'conspicuous hill on the southern side of the main valley', between "Shuweikeh" (Sokoh) and "Tell-es-Sâfi" (Gath), exactly in the natural line of the Philistines' flight.
- "As far as Gath and Ekron"; Josephus wrote "to the borders of Gath, and to the gates of Ashkelon", which were two other major cities of the Philistines. According to Bunting, the chase of the Philistines was to the valley and river Sorek for four miles from the place where Goliath was killed, continuing to Ekron eight miles; to Ashkelon twenty miles, and to Gath twenty four miles. "Gath" was located at the mouth of the terebinth valley (cf. Joshua 13:3).

== A concluding flashback (17:55–58) ==
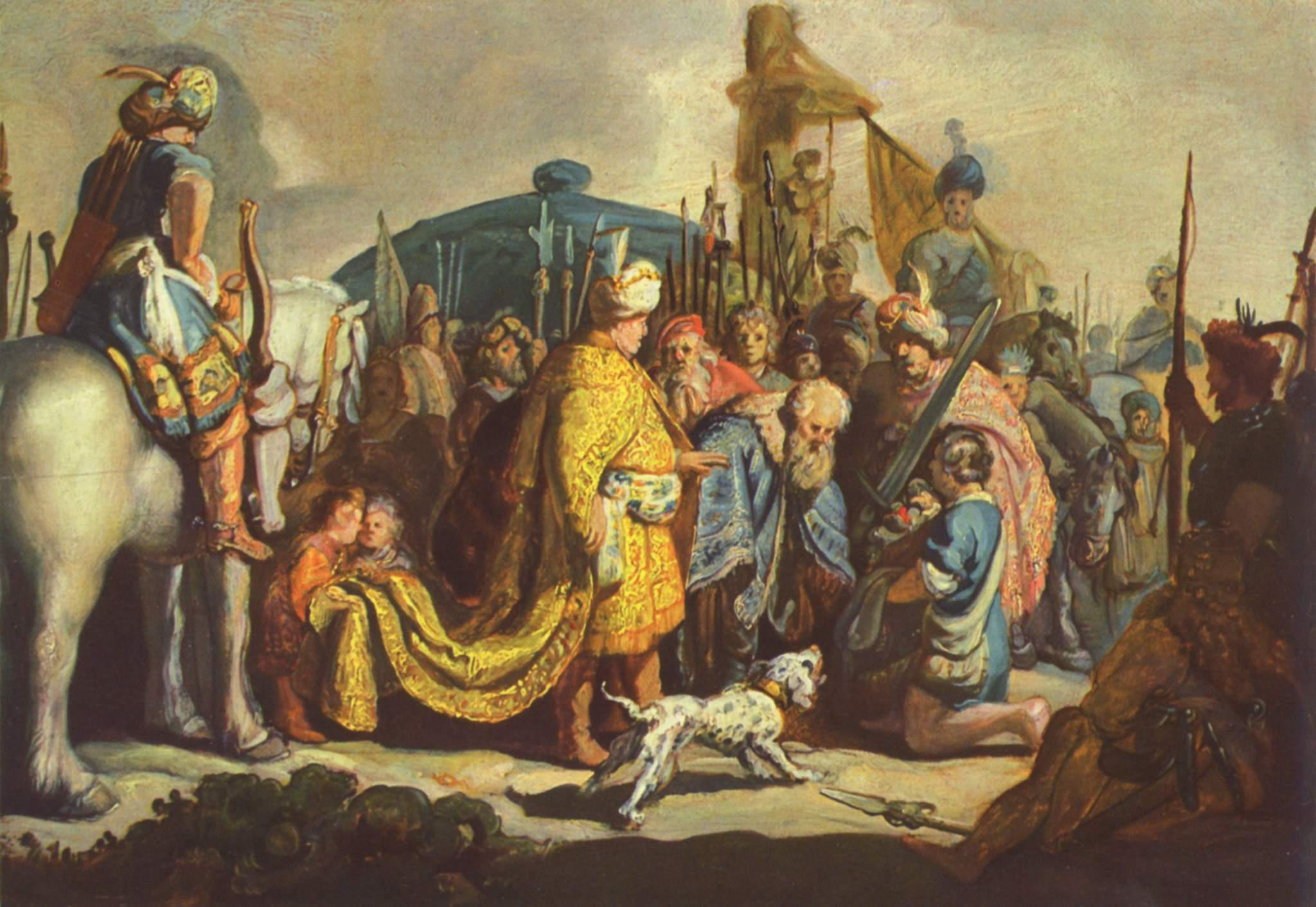
David with the head of Goliath before Saul (1 Samuel 17:57-58), by Rembrandt van Rijn (1606–1669).

The narrative looks back to the time David was about to fight Goliath, while Saul looked on and asked Abner, his general, who David's father was. At a glance, this seems to contradict the account in the previous chapter, that Saul was informed about David, the son of Jesse (16:8) and twice sent messengers to Jesse (16:19, 22). However, rather than a possibility of memory lapse due to mental illness, the question may be a hint for Abner to check deeper into David's family background, apparently in the context to Saul's promise of tax exemption for family of the one killing the giant (17:25), but also in relation to Saul's suspicion of anyone among his 'friends/neighbors', who would succeed him, as told in multiple occasions. Fast forward to the time Abner brought David, still holding Goliath's head, to Saul, the king did not offer congratulations or thanks, but focused for the inquiry of David's family, an indication that Saul began to see David as a rival.

== See also ==
- Abinadab
- Anointing
- Bethlehem
- Eliab
- Ephah
- Ephesdammim
- Greave
- Jesse the Ephrathite
- Israelites
- Mail
- Shaaraim
- Shammah
- Shekel
- Tribe of Judah
- Related Bible parts: Joshua 15, Judges 1, 1 Samuel 15, 1 Samuel 16

== Sources ==
=== Commentaries on Samuel ===
- Auld, Graeme (2003). "1 & 2 Samuel". In James D. G. Dunn and John William Rogerson (ed.). Eerdmans Commentary on the Bible. Eerdmans. ISBN 9780802837110.
- Bergen, David T. (1996). 1, 2 Samuel. B&H Publishing Group. ISBN 9780805401073.
- Chapman, Stephen B. (2016). 1 Samuel as Christian Scripture: A Theological Commentary. Wm. B. Eerdmans Publishing Company. ISBN 978-1467445160.
- Evans, Paul (2018). Longman, Tremper (ed.). 1-2 Samuel. The Story of God Bible Commentary. Zondervan Academic. ISBN 978-0310490944.
- Gordon, Robert (1986). I & II Samuel, A Commentary. Paternoster Press. ISBN 9780310230229.
- Hertzberg, Hans Wilhelm (1964). I & II Samuel, A Commentary (trans. from German 2nd edition 1960 ed.). Westminster John Knox Press. p. 19. ISBN 978-0664223182.
- Tsumura, David Toshio (2007). The First Book of Samuel. Eerdmans. ISBN 9780802823595.

=== Specific subjects ===
- Billington, Clyde E (2007). "Goliath and the Exodus Giants: How Tall Were They?" (PDF). 50/3: 489–508. Archived from the original (PDF) on 2021-12-27.
- Hays, J. Daniel (2005). "Reconsidering the Height of Goliath" (PDF). Journal of the Evangelical Theological Society. 48/4: 701–714. Archived from the original (PDF) on 2023-07-10.
- Hays, J. Daniel (2007). "The Height of Goliath: a response to Clyde Billington" (PDF). Journal of the Evangelical Theological Society. 50/3: 509–516. Archived from the original (PDF) on 2021-12-26.

=== General ===
- Breytenbach, Andries (2000). "Who Is Behind The Samuel Narrative?". In Johannes Cornelis de Moor and H.F. Van Rooy (ed.). Past, Present, Future: the Deuteronomistic History and the Prophets. Brill. ISBN 9789004118713.
- Coogan, Michael David (2007). Coogan, Michael David; Brettler, Marc Zvi; Newsom, Carol Ann; Perkins, Pheme (eds.). The New Oxford Annotated Bible with the Apocryphal/Deuterocanonical Books: New Revised Standard Version, Issue 48 (Augmented 3rd ed.). Oxford University Press. ISBN 978-0195288810.
- Fitzmyer, Joseph A. (2008). A Guide to the Dead Sea Scrolls and Related Literature. Grand Rapids, MI: William B. Eerdmans Publishing Company. ISBN 9780802862419.
- Halley, Henry H. (1965). Halley's Bible Handbook: an abbreviated Bible commentary (24th (revised) ed.). Zondervan Publishing House. ISBN 0-310-25720-4.
- Hayes, Christine (2015). Introduction to the Bible. Yale University Press. ISBN 978-0300188271.
- Jones, Gwilym H. (2007). "12. 1 and 2 Samuel". In Barton, John; Muddiman, John (eds.). The Oxford Bible Commentary (first (paperback) ed.). Oxford University Press. pp. 196–232. ISBN 978-0199277186.
- Klein, R.W. (2003). "Samuel, books of". In Bromiley, Geoffrey W (ed.). The International Standard Bible Encyclopedia. Eerdmans. ISBN 9780802837844.
- Knight, Douglas A (1995). "Chapter 4 Deuteronomy and the Deuteronomists". In James Luther Mays, David L. Petersen and Kent Harold Richards (ed.). Old Testament Interpretation. T&T Clark. ISBN 9780567292896.
- Ulrich, Eugene, ed. (2010). The Biblical Qumran Scrolls: Transcriptions and Textual Variants. Brill.
- Würthwein, Ernst (1995). The Text of the Old Testament. Translated by Rhodes, Erroll F. Grand Rapids, MI: Wm. B. Eerdmans. ISBN 0-8028-0788-7.
