= Naioth =

Naioth was a biblical place located in Ramah. The prophet Samuel and the anointed one David took refuge together there after David's escape from the jealous anger of King Saul. The word may mean "living places" or "dwellings". McClintock and Strong suggest that "from an early date [Naioth] has been interpreted to mean the huts or dwellings of a school or college of prophets over which Samuel presided".

Naioth is spelled Najoth in the 1899 Douay–Rheims Bible and Navath in Brenton's translation of the Septuagint.

== Biblical importance ==
Naioth is mentioned in 1 Samuel 19:18–19 and 1 Samuel 19:22–23 as a place where Samuel supervised a community of prophets and to which David escaped from Saul. Saul sent a series of messengers to Naioth intending for them to capture David and kill him, but instead, each of them started prophesying. In anger, Saul rose to do it himself, but he also found himself prophesying. This event gave rise to the proverb, "Is Saul among the prophets?"

== See also ==
- Saul
- David
