= Genesis 29 =

Genesis 29 may refer to:

- Vayetze, the Jewish parashah which covers this chapter from the Book of Genesis
- Jacob's marriages and family life, recounted in this chapter.
