= Jabez =

Jabez or Jabes is a male name and surname derived from the biblical Jabez, of whom the Books of Chronicles says his mother named him Jabez (Hebrew יַעְבֵּץ [ya'betz]), meaning "he makes sorrowful", because his birth was difficult.

People with the name include:

== People ==
=== Given name ===
- Jabez Balfour (1843–1916), British businessman, politician and fraudster
- Jabez A. Bostwick (1830–1892), American businessman and founding partner of Standard Oil
- Jabez Bowen (1739–1815), American politician and jurist from Rhode Island
- Jabez Bryce (1935–2010), Anglican Archbishop of Polynesia and the first Pacific Islander to become an Anglican bishop
- Jabez Bunting (1779–1858), English Methodist leader
- Jabez Burns (1805–1876), English nonconformist divine and Christian philosophical writer
- Jabez Coon (1869–1935), Australian politician
- Jabez L. M. Curry (1825–1903), American politician, lawyer, soldier, college professor and administrator, diplomat, and Confederate officer
- Jabez Darnell (1884–1950), English footballer
- Jabez Hamlin (1709–1791), American politician and jurist from Connecticut
- Jabez Delano Hammond (1778–1855), American physician, lawyer, author and politician
- Jabez Carter Hornblower (1744–1814), English pioneer of steam power
- Jabez Huntington (colonist) (1719–1786), American politician and major general from Connecticut
- Jabez W. Huntington (1788–1847), American politician from Connecticut
- Jabez Young Jackson (1790–1839), American politician from Georgia
- Jabez Leftwich (1765–1855), American politician from Virginia
- Jabez M. Smith, American politician from Arkansas
- Jabez Melville Smith, American politician from Mississippi
- Jabez Bunting Snowball (1837–1907), Canadian politician and businessman from New Brunswick
- J. Curry Street (1906–1989), American physicist, co-discover of muons
- Jabez G. Sutherland (1825–1902), American politician and jurist from Michigan
- Jabez Upham (1764–1811), American politician from Massachusetts
- Jabez Vodrey (1795–1861), first English potter west of the Appalachian Mountains of North America
- Jabez Waterhouse (1821–1891), English-born Australian Methodist minister
- Jabez H. Wells (1853–1930), American politician and curler

=== Nickname ===
- Jacob Jabez Wolffe (1876–1943), Scottish long-distance swimmer and author

=== Surname ===
- Barzillai ben Baruch Jabez, Turkish Talmudist of the seventeenth and eighteenth centuries
- Isaac Jabez (died 1547), physician and rabbi in Thessaloniki
- Joseph ben Hayyim Jabez (1438–1539), Spanish-Jewish theologian

=== Pen name ===
- Eric Nicol (1919–2011), Canadian author, who early wrote under the pen name "Jabez"

== Fictional characters ==
- Jabez Clegg, the eponymous character in Isabella Banks' 1876 novel The Manchester Man and its 1920 film adaptation
- Jabez Dexter, the villain of the 1949 Wonder Woman comic Sensation Comics #87
- Jabez North, the villain of The Trail of the Serpent, Mary Elizabeth Braddon's first novel
- Jabez Potter, in Alice B. Emerson's Ruth Fielding of the Red Mill (1913), the first of a 30-book series
- Jabez Stone, the protagonist of the short story "The Devil and Daniel Webster" and its film adaptations
- Jabez Stump, a secondary character in the 1989 Redwall series novel Mattimeo and the second season of the Redwall animated television show
- Jabez Wilson, a main character in "The Red-Headed League", a Sherlock Holmes short story
- Jabez, a boat rental operator in To Say Nothing of the Dog, a novel by Connie Willis
