= J. M. Smith =

J. M. Smith may refer to:

- Jabez M. Smith (?–1891), Arkansas state senator
- Jabez Melville Smith (1843–?), Mississippi state legislator
- James Marcus Smith, birth name of P. J. Proby (born 1938), American singer, songwriter, and actor
- J. M. Smith (Arizona politician), member of the 6th and 7th Arizona State Legislatures 1923–1926
- J. M. Smith (Texas politician), member of the 3rd Texas Legislature 1849–1850
