= Mantra =

Sacred utterance or sound used in meditation, often repeated

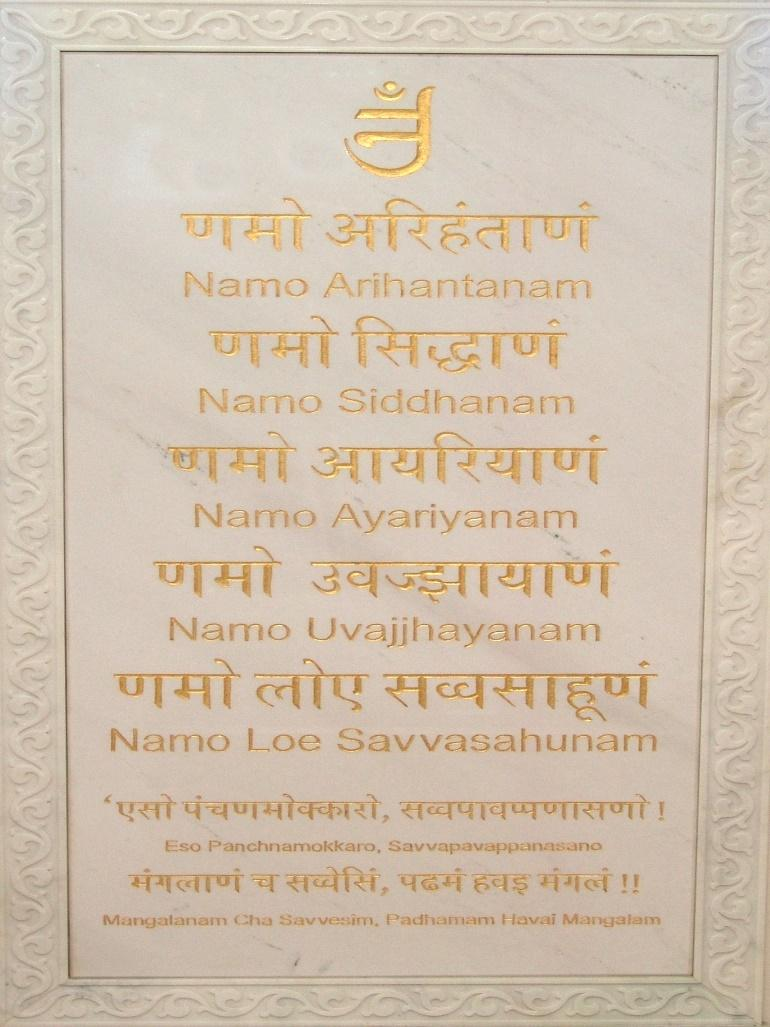
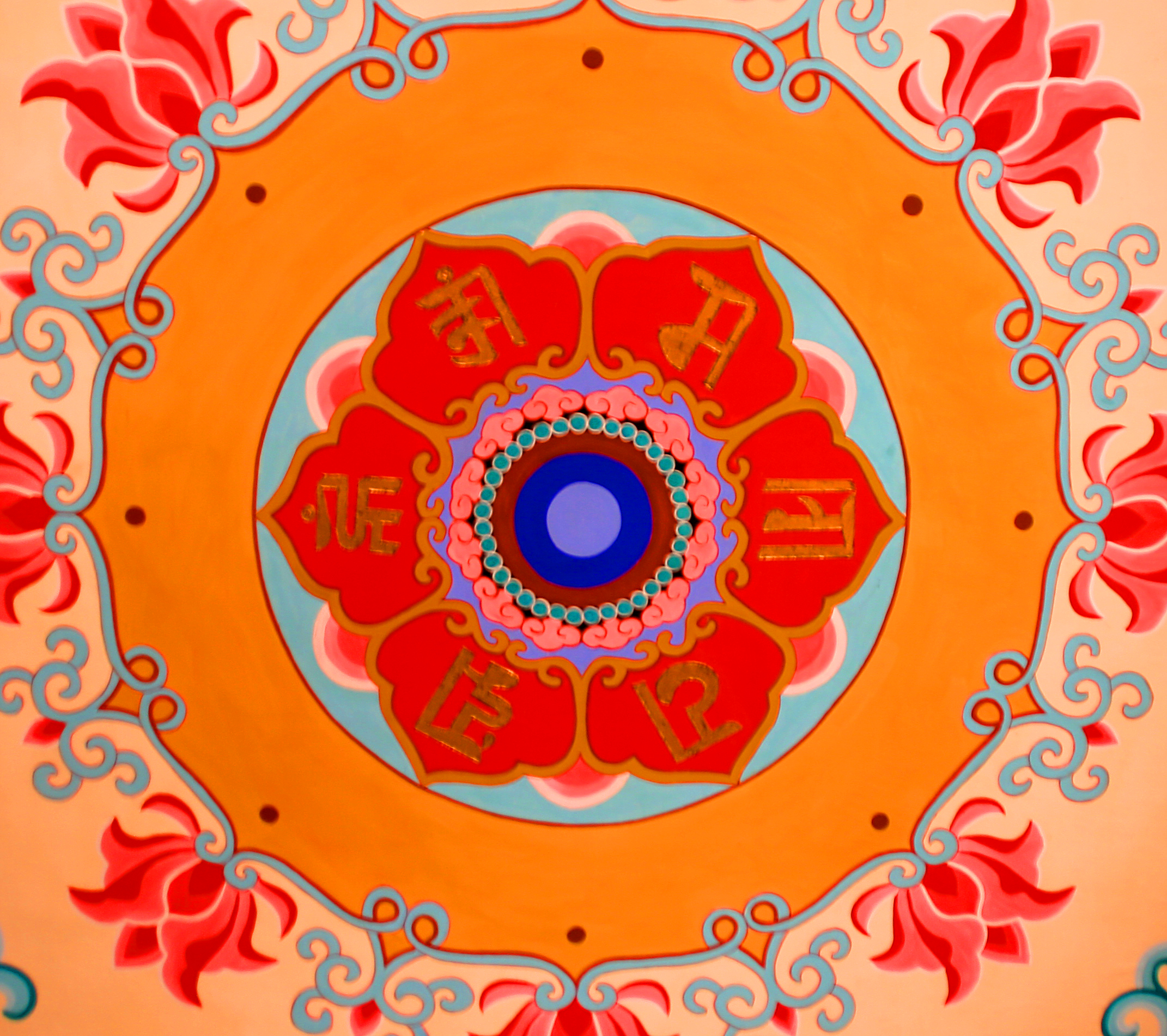
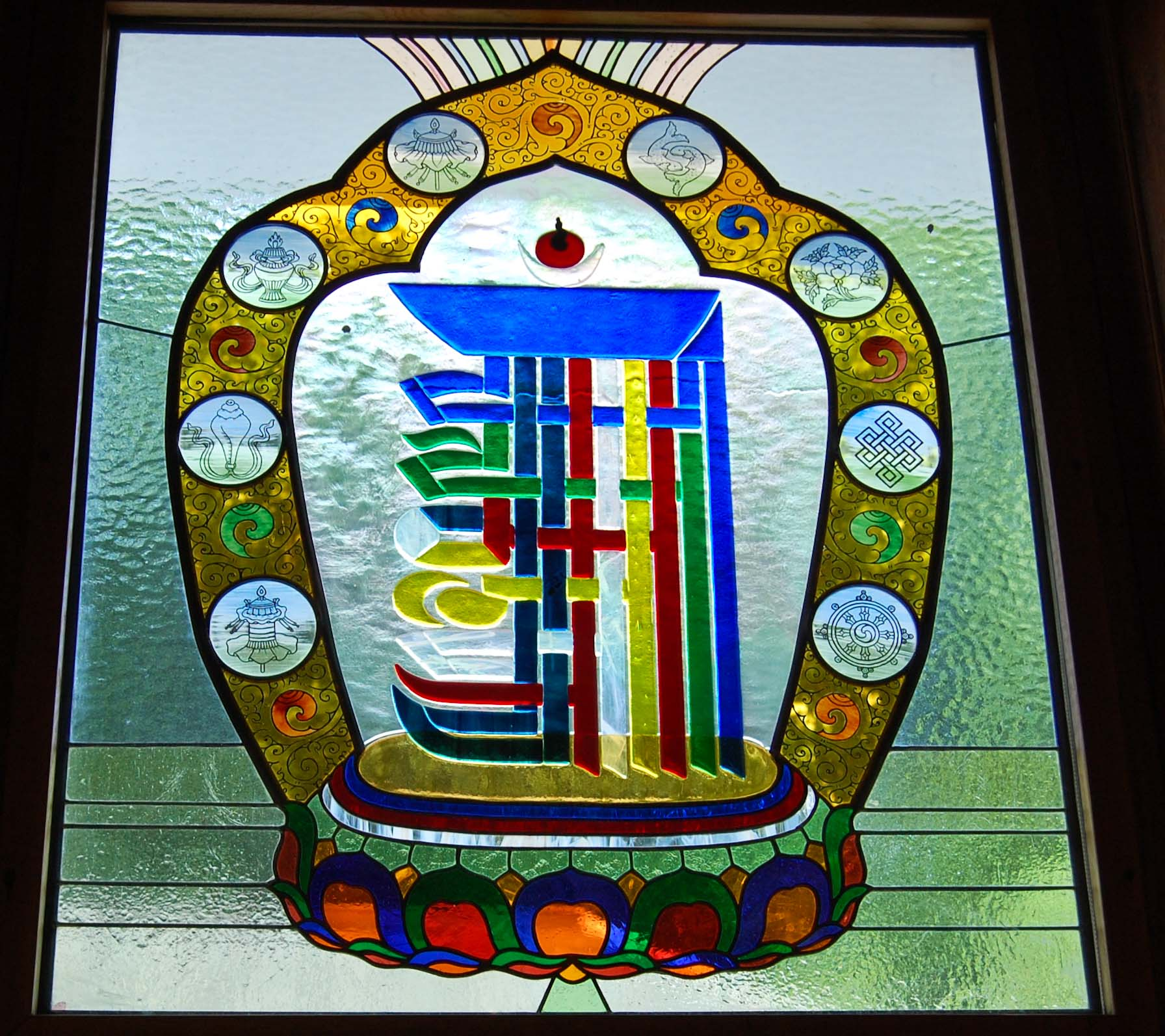
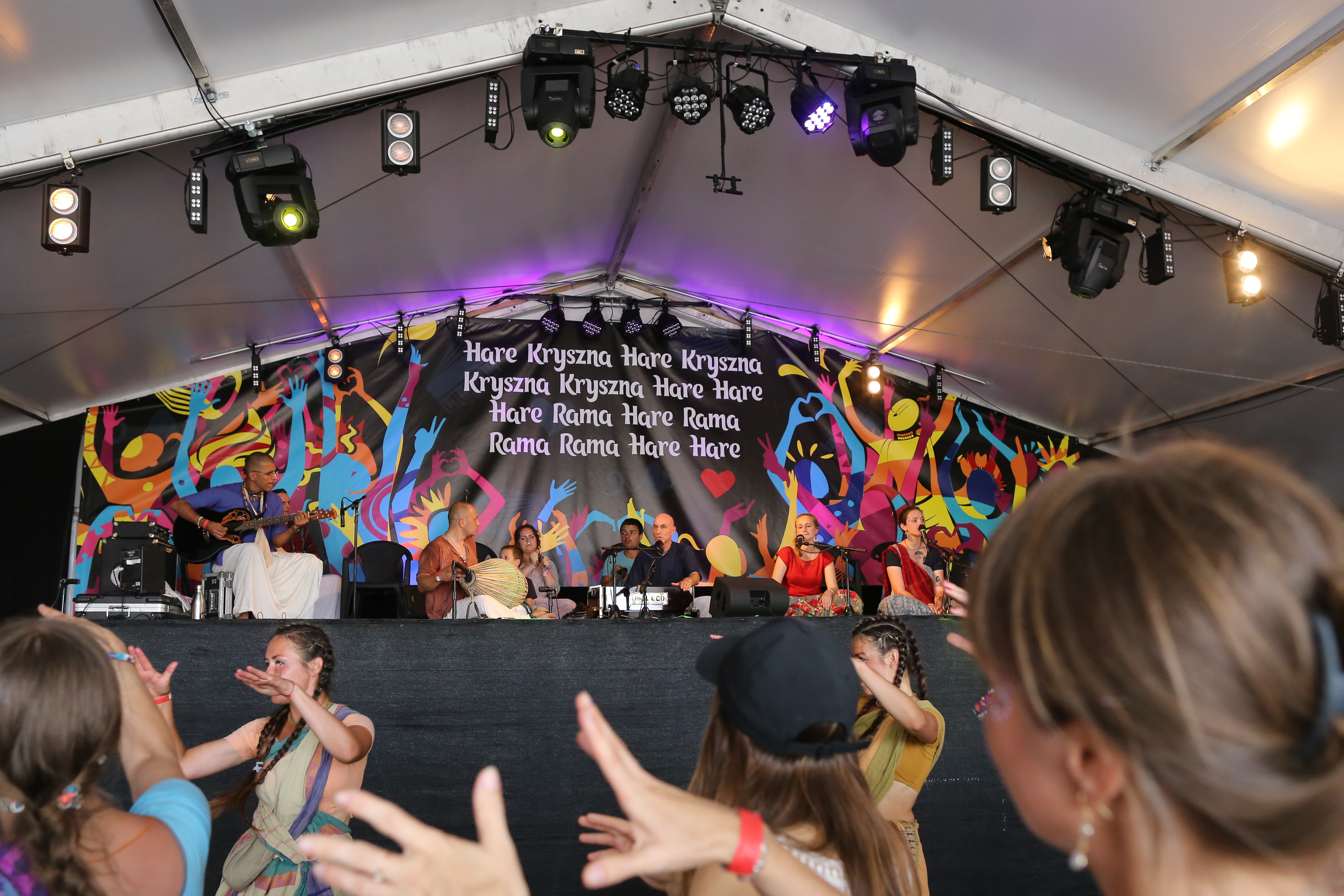
Clockwise from upper left: Om (an ancient Vedic mantra used in Hinduism and Buddhism); the Ṇamōkāra mantra (the most important mantra in Jainism); the Vajrayana Buddhist E-VAM mantra, known as the Kalachakra "Tenfold Powerful One"; the Hare Krishna mantra in a modern concert setting; Om mani padme hum (a popular Buddhist mantra) in Tianjin Temple (Ranjana script).

A mantra (/ˈmæntrə, ˈmʌn-/ MAN-trə, MUN-; Pali: mantra) or mantram (Devanagari: मन्त्रम्) is a sacred utterance, a numinous sound, syllable, word or phonemes, or group of words (most often in an Indo-Iranian language such as Sanskrit or Avestan) that practitioners believe to have religious, magical or spiritual powers. Etymologically derived from Sanskrit, the word "mantra" combines the roots "man-" (referring to the mind) and "-tra" (signifying a tool or instrument); consequently, a mantra can be understood as a mental tool designed to focus and control thought. Some mantras have a syntactic structure and literal meaning, while others do not.

ꣽ, ॐ (Aum, Om) serves as a mantra in various Indian religions. It is an example of a seed syllable mantra (bijamantra). According to Hinduism Om is believed to be the first sound and the sonic essence of the absolute divine reality. Longer mantras are phrases with several syllables, names and words. These phrases may have spiritual interpretations such as a name of a deity, a longing for truth, reality, light, immortality, peace, love, knowledge, and action. Examples of longer mantras include the Gayatri Mantra, the Hare Krishna mantra, Om Namah Shivaya, the Mani mantra, the Mantra of Light, the Namokar Mantra, and the Mūl Mantar. Mantras without any actual linguistic meaning are still considered to be musically uplifting and spiritually meaningful.

The use, structure, function, importance, and types of mantras vary according to the school and philosophy of Jainism, Buddhism, Hinduism, Zoroastrianism, and Sikhism. A common practice is japa, the meditative repetition of a mantra, usually with the aid of a mala (prayer beads). Mantras serve a central role in the Indian tantric traditions, which developed elaborate yogic methods which make use of mantras. In tantric religions (often called "mantra paths", Sanskrit: Mantranāya or Mantramarga), mantric methods are considered to be the most effective path. Ritual initiation (abhiseka) into a specific mantra and its associated deity is often a requirement for reciting certain mantras in these traditions. However, in some religious traditions, initiation is not always required for certain mantras, which are open to all.

The word mantra is also used in English to refer to something that is said frequently and is deliberately repeated over and over.

== Etymology and origins ==
The earliest mention of mantras is found in the Vedas of ancient India and the Avesta of ancient Iran. Both Sanskrit mántra and the equivalent Avestan mąθra go back to the common Proto-Indo-Iranian *mantram, consisting of the Indo-European *men "to think" and the instrumental suffix *trom. According to scholars, due to linguistic and functional similarities, mantras likely date to the common Indo-Iranian period, commonly dated to around 2000 BCE.

Scholars consider the use of mantras to have begun in India before 1000 BC. By the middle Vedic period (1000 BC to 500 BC) – claims Frits Staal – mantras in Hinduism had developed into a blend of art and science.

The Chinese translation is 真言; zhenyan; 'true words', the Japanese on'yomi reading of the Chinese being shingon (which is also used as the proper name for the Shingon sect). According to Alex Wayman and Ryujun Tajima, "Zhenyan" (or "Shingon") means "true speech", has the sense of "an exact mantra which reveals the truth of the dharmas", and is the path of mantras.

According to Bernfried Schlerath, the concept of sātyas mantras is found in Indo-Iranian Yasna 31.6 and the Rigveda, where it is considered structured thought in conformity with the reality or poetic (religious) formulas associated with inherent fulfillment.

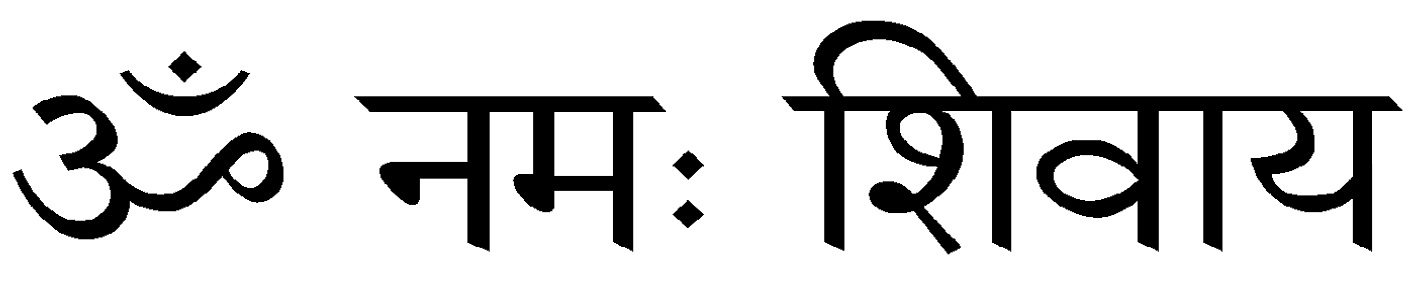
"Aum Namah Shivaya" is praised as one of the most sacred mantra in Hinduism

== Definition ==
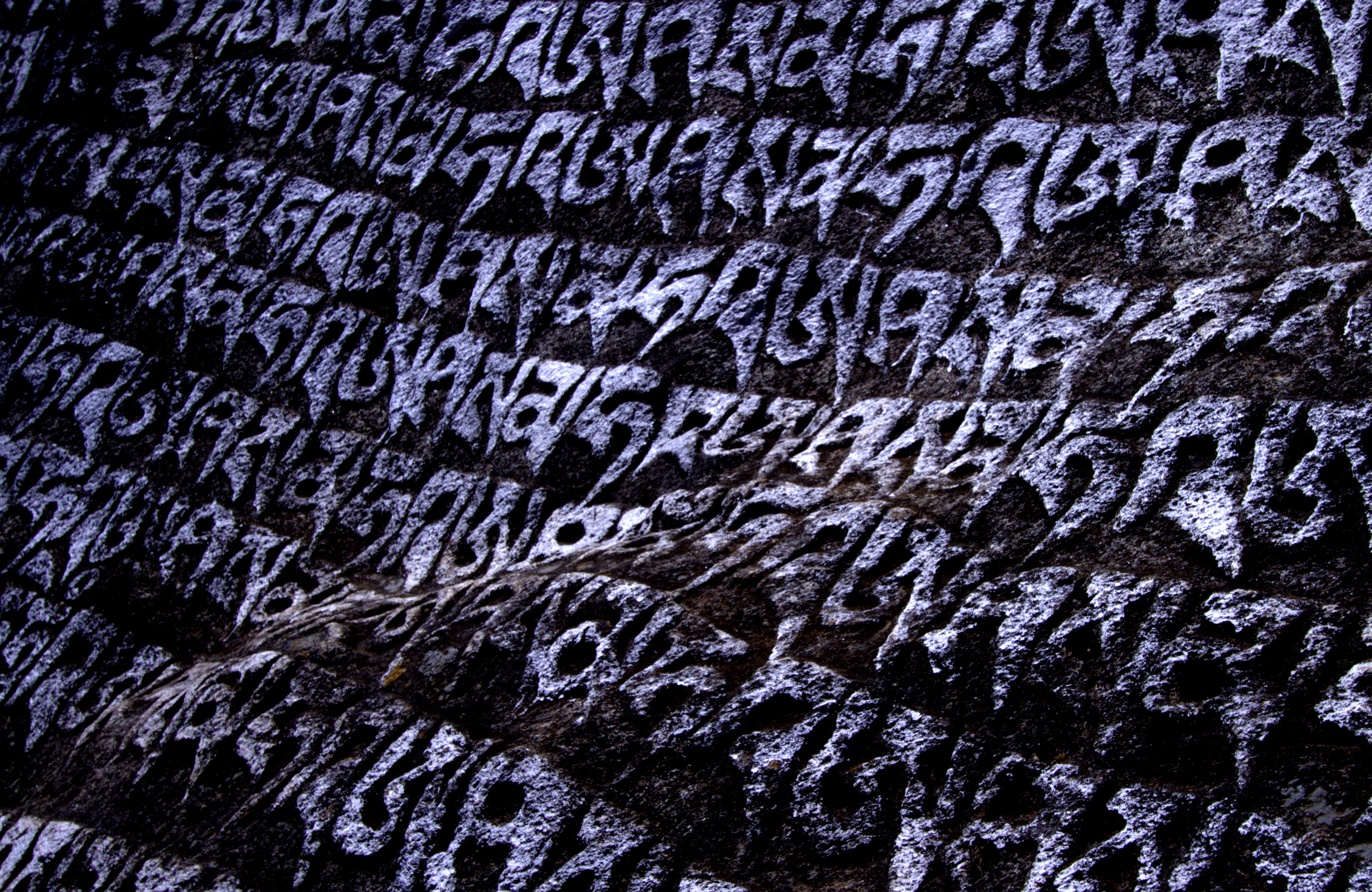
Mantras written on a rock near Namche Bazaar, Nepal

There is no generally accepted definition of mantra. Scholars have long disagreed on the meaning of mantras and whether they are instruments of mind, as implied by the etymological origin of the word mantra. One school suggests mantras are mostly meaningless sound constructs, while the other holds them to be mostly meaningful linguistic instruments of mind. Both schools agree that mantras have melody and a well designed mathematical precision in their construction and that their influence on the reciter and listener is similar to that is observed in people around the world listening to their beloved music that is devoid of words.

The Oxford Living Dictionary defines a mantra as a word or sound repeated to aid concentration in meditation. The Cambridge Dictionary provides two definitions: a word or sound believed to possess spiritual power, and a word or phrase frequently repeated expression to express a strong belief.

Louis Renou defines a mantra as a thought. Mantras are structured formulae of thoughts, claims Silburn. Farquhar describes mantras as a religious thought, prayer, sacred utterance that may also be believed to possess supernatural power. Zimmer defines mantra as a verbal instrument to produce something in one's mind. Agehananda Bharati defines mantra, in the context of the Tantric school of Hinduism, to be a combination of mixed genuine and quasi-morphemes arranged in conventional patterns, based on codified esoteric traditions, passed on from a guru to a disciple through prescribed initiation.

Jan Gonda defines mantra as general name for the verses, formulas or sequences of words in prose that contain praise, are believed to have religious, magical or spiritual efficacy, are meditated upon, recited, muttered or sung in a ritual, and are collected in the methodically arranged ancient texts of Hinduism. By comparing the Old Indic Vedic and Old Iranian Avestan traditions, Gonda concludes that in the oldest texts, mantras were "means of creating, conveying, concentrating and realizing intentional and efficient thought, and of coming into touch or identifying oneself with the essence of the divinity". In some later schools of Hinduism, Gonda suggests a mantra is sakti (power) to the devotee in the form of formulated and expressed thought.

A Mantra Chant
A Buddhist mantra chant set to Indian classical music (6 minutes 19 seconds)

Frits Staal clarifies that mantras are not rituals, but utterances recited or chanted during rituals. Staal presents a non-linguistic view of mantras. He suggests that verse mantras are metered and harmonized to mathematical precision (for example, in the viharanam technique), which resonate, many contain meaningless sound constructs such as those found in folk music around the world. Staal cautions that some mantras have translatable meanings and have philosophical themes central to Hinduism, but others do not. He further notes that even when mantras do not have a literal meaning, they set a tone and ambience in the ritual as they are recited, and thus have ritual significance. He compares mantras to bird songs, which have the power to communicate, yet do not have a literal meaning.

On that saman category of Hindu mantras, Staal compares their musical structure to the arias of Bach's oratorios and other European classics, and notes that their syntax differ substantially from that of natural languages. The saman chant mantras were transmitted from one Hindu generation to next verbally for over 1000 years but never written, a feat, suggests Staal, that was made possible by the strict mathematical principles used in constructing the mantras. These saman chant mantras are also mostly meaningless, cannot be literally translated as Sanskrit or any Indian language, but nevertheless are beautiful in their resonant themes, variations, inversions, and distribution. The ancient Vedic thinker Kautsa was one of the earliest scholars to note that mantras are meaningless; their function is phonetic and syntactic, not semantic.

Harvey Alper and others present mantras from the linguistic point view. They admit Staal's observation that many mantras contain bits and pieces of meaningless jargon, but they question what language or text doesn't. The presence of an abracadabra bit does not necessarily imply the entire work is meaningless. Alper lists numerous mantras that have philosophical themes, moral principles, and calls to virtuous life, and even mundane petitions. He suggests that the devotee's choice of mantra expresses an intention directed towards a particular spiritual entity. Mantras can create emotional and numinous effect on practitioners, producing experiences that may be difficult to express.

== Hinduism ==
=== History ===
During the early Vedic period, Vedic poets became fascinated by the inspirational power of poems, metered verses, and music. They referred to them with the root dhi-, which evolved into the dhyana (meditation) of Hinduism, and the language used to start and assist this process manifested as a mantra. By the middle vedic period (1000 BC to 500 BC), mantras were derived from all vedic compositions. They included ṛc (verses from Rigveda for example), sāman (musical chants from the Sāmaveda for example), yajus (a muttered formula from the yajurveda for example), and nigada (a loudly spoken yajus). During the Hindu Epics period and after, mantras multiplied in many ways and diversified to meet the needs and passions of various schools of Hinduism. According to the Linga Purana, Mantra is listed among the 1,008 names of deity Shiva.

Numerous ancient mantras are found in the Saṃhitā portion of the Vedas. The Saṃhitās are the most ancient layer of the Vedas, and contain numerous mantras, hymns, prayers, and litanies. The Rigveda Samhita contains about 10552 Mantras, classified into ten books called Mandalas. A Sukta is a group of Mantras. Mantras come in many forms, including ṛc (verses from the Rigveda for example) and sāman (musical chants from the Sāmaveda for example).

In Hindu tradition, Vedas are sacred scriptures which were revealed (and not composed) by the seers (Rishis). According to the ancient commentator and linguist, Yaska, these ancient sacred revelations were then passed down through an oral tradition and are considered to be the foundation for the Hindu tradition.

Mantras took a center stage in Tantric traditions, which made extensive ritual and meditative use of mantras, and posited that each mantra is a deity in sonic form.

=== Function and structure ===
One function of mantras is to solemnize and ratify rituals. Each mantra, in Vedic rituals, is coupled with an act. According to Apastamba Srauta Sutra, each ritual act is accompanied by one mantra, unless the Sutra explicitly marks that one act corresponds to several mantras. According to Gonda, and others, there is a connection and rationale between a Vedic mantra and each Vedic ritual act that accompanies it. In these cases, the function of mantras was to be an instrument of ritual efficacy for the priest, and a tool of instruction for a ritual act for others.

Over time, as the Puranas and Epics were composed, the concepts of worship, virtues and spirituality evolved in Hinduism and new schools of Hinduism were founded, each continuing to develop and refine its own mantras. In Hinduism, suggests Alper, the function of mantras shifted from the quotidian to redemptive. In other words, in Vedic times, mantras were recited a practical, quotidian goal as intention, such as requesting a deity's help in the discovery of lost cattle, cure of illness, succeeding in competitive sport or journey away from home. The literal translation of Vedic mantras suggests that the function of mantra, in these cases, was to cope with the uncertainties and dilemmas of daily life. In a later period of Hinduism, mantras were recited with a transcendental redemptive goal as intention, such as escape from the cycle of life and rebirth, forgiveness for bad karma, and experiencing a spiritual connection with the god. The function of mantras, in these cases, was to cope with the human condition as a whole. According to Alper, redemptive spiritual mantras opened the door for mantras where every part need not have a literal meaning, but together their resonance and musical quality assisted the transcendental spiritual process. Overall, explains Alper, using Śivasūtra mantras as an example, Hindu mantras have philosophical themes and are metaphorical with social dimension and meaning; in other words, they are a spiritual language and instrument of thought.

According to Staal, Hindu mantras may be spoken aloud, anirukta (not enunciated), upamsu (inaudible), or manasa (not spoken, but recited in the mind). In ritual use, mantras are often silent instruments of meditation.

=== Invocation ===
According to some Hindu texts, each mantra has six aspects, called Shadanga. These six aspects are: seer (rishi), deity (devata), seed (bija), energy (Shakti), poetic meter (chanda), and lock (kilaka).

=== Methods ===
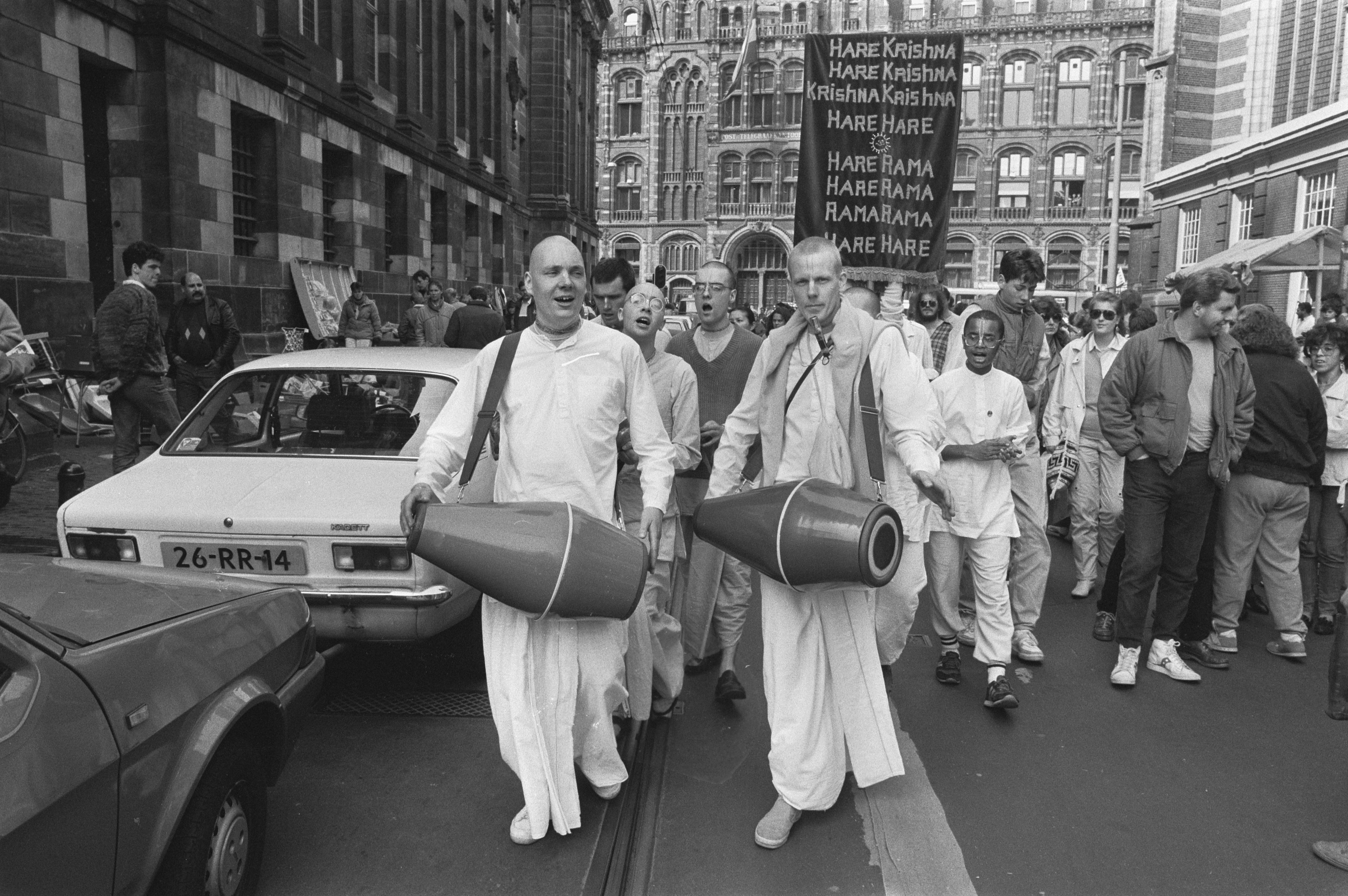
Hare Krishna devotees in Amsterdam carrying a poster with the Hare Krishna Mantra

The most basic mantra is Om, which in Hinduism is known as the "pranava mantra," the source of all mantras. The Hindu philosophy behind this is the premise that before existence and beyond existence is only One reality, Brahman, and the first manifestation of Brahman expressed as Om. For this reason, Om is considered as a foundational idea and reminder, and thus is prefixed and suffixed to all Hindu prayers. While some mantras may invoke individual gods or principles, fundamental mantras such as Shanti Mantra, the Gayatri Mantra and others ultimately focus on the One reality.

Japa

Mantra japa is a practice of repetitively uttering the same mantra for an auspicious number of times, the most popular being 108, and sometimes just 5, 10, 28 or 1008. Japa is found in personal prayer or meditative efforts of some Hindus, as well during formal puja (group prayers). Japa is assisted by malas (bead necklaces) containing 108 beads and a head bead (sometimes referred to as the 'meru', or 'guru' bead); the devotee using their fingers to count each bead as they repeat the chosen mantra. Having reached 108 repetitions, if they wish to continue another cycle of mantras, the devotee turns the mala around without crossing the head bead and repeats the cycle. Japa-yajna is claimed to be most effective if the mantra is repeated silently in mind (manasah).

According to this school, any verse shloka from Hindu texts such as the Vedas, Upanishads, Bhagavad Gita, Yoga Sutra, even the Mahabharata, Ramayana, Durga saptashati or Chandi can be considered a mantra and used in japa, practice to achieve a spiritual effect. The Dharmasāstra claims that the Gāyatri mantra, derived from Rig Veda verse 3.62.10, and the Purușasūkta mantra, from Rig Veda verse 10.90, are the most auspicious mantras for japa at sunrise and sunset; it is claimed to purify the mind and spirit.

==== Kirtan (chanting) ====
Kirtan is a more musical form of mantric practice. It is a common method in the bhakti traditions, such as Gaudiya Vaishnavism. Kirtan includes call and response forms of chanting accompanied by various Indian instruments (such as the tabla, mrdanga and harmonium), and it may also include dancing and theatrical performance. Kirtan is also common in Sikhism.

Tantric

According to Tantric Hindu traditions, the universe as sound.

Buhnemann notes that deity mantras are an essential part of Tantric compendia. The tantric mantras vary in their structure and length. Mala mantras are those mantras which have an enormous number of syllables. In contrast, bija mantras are one-syllabled, typically ending in anusvara (a simple nasal sound). These are derived from the name of a deity; for example, Durga yields dum and Ganesha yields gam. Bija mantras are prefixed and appended to other mantras, thereby creating complex mantras. In the tantric school, these mantras are believed to have supernatural powers, and they are transmitted by a preceptor to a disciple in an initiation ritual. Tantric mantras found a significant audience and adaptations in medieval India, Southeast Asia and numerous other Asian countries with Buddhism.

Majumdar and other scholars suggest mantras are central to the Tantric school, with numerous functions. From initiating and emancipating a tantric devotee to worshiping manifested forms of the divine. From enabling heightened sexual energy in the male and the female to acquiring supernormal psychological and spiritual power. From preventing evil influences to exorcizing demons, and many others. These claimed functions and other aspects of tantric mantra have been a subject of scholarly debate.

=== Examples ===
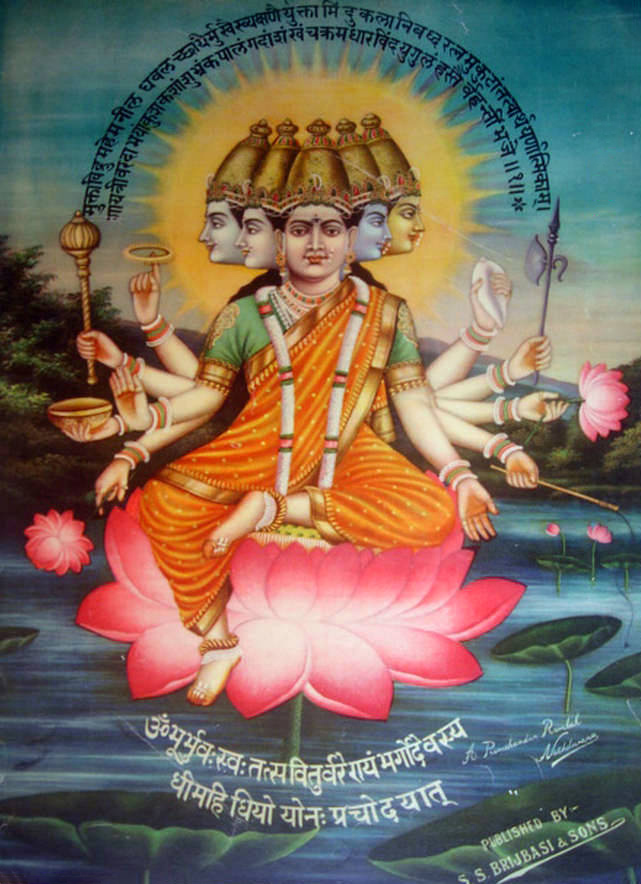
A personification of the Gayatri Mantra

==== Gayatri ====
The Gayatri mantra is considered one of the most universal of all Hindu mantras, invoking the universal Brahman as the principle of knowledge and the illumination of the primordial Sun. The mantra is extracted from the 10th verse of Hymn 62 in Book III of the Rig Veda.

ॐ भूर्भुवस्व: |तत्सवितुर्वरेण्यम् |भर्गो देवस्य धीमहि |धियो यो न: प्रचोदयात्

Oṁ bhūr bhuvaḥ svaḥ tat savitur vareṇyaṃ bhargo devasya dhīmahi dhiyo yo naḥ pracodayāt,

"Let us meditate on that excellent glory of the divine Light (Vivifier, Sun). May he stimulate our understandings (knowledge, intellectual illumination)."

==== Pavamana ====
असतो मा सद्गमय । तमसो मा ज्योतिर्गमय । मृत्योर्मामृतं गमय ॥ asato mā sad-gamaya, tamaso mā jyotir-gamaya, mṛtyor-māmṛtaṃ gamaya.
(Bṛhadāraṇyaka Upaniṣad 1.3.28)

"from the unreal lead me to the real, from the dark lead me to the light, from death lead me to immortality."

==== Shanti ====
Oṁ Sahanā vavatu sahanau bhunaktu sahavīryam karavāvahai tejasvi nāvadhītamastu
Mā vidviṣāvahai
Oṁ Shāntiḥ, Shāntiḥ, Shāntiḥ.

"Om! Let the Studies that we together undertake be effulgent;
Let there be no Animosity amongst us;
Om! Peace, Peace, Peace."
– Taittiriya Upanishad 2.2.2

==== Other ====
Other important Hindu mantras include:

- Mahāmṛtyuṃjaya-mantra (Great Death Defeating Mantra) - A popular Rigvedic mantra dedicated to Rudra
- Om̐ Namah Shivaya - one of the main mantras in Shaivism
- Om̐ kālabhairavāya namaḥ - a key mantra of Bhairava, the fierce form of Shiva
- Om̐ Namo Narayanaya - the principal mantra of Vishnu in Vaishnavism
- Hare Krishna Maha Mantra - a central mantra in the Vaishnava Bhakti tradition of Chaitanya Mahaprabhu
- Om̐ aim mahāsarasvatyai namaḥ - a mantra of Saraswati
- Om̐ Śrīm̐ Mahālakṣmyai Namaha - a Lakshmi mantra
- Om̐ Krim Kali - a Kali seed (bija) mantra
- Om̐ Śrī Durgāya Namaḥ - one of the principal mantras in Shaktism and Shaivism dedicated to Durga
- Ka E I La Hrim Ha Sa Ka La Ha Hrim Sa Ka La Hrim - the Panchadasi, the main mantra of Lalita in Srividya
- Om̐ Śrī Gaṇeśāya Namaḥ - a key mantra of Ganesha
- Om̐ Śrī Hanumate Namaḥ - the root mantra of Hanuman
- Om hrim ksaumugram viram mahavivnumjvalantam sarvatomukham Nrsimham bhisanam bhadrammrtyormrtyum namamyaham - Narasimha mahamantra
- Om̐ Namo Bhagavate Vāsudevāya - the key mantra in Bhagavatism
- Om̐ Aim Hreem Kleem Chamundayai Vichche - a mantra of the goddess Chamunda
- Om̐ Shree Ram Jai Ram Jai Jai Ram - a mantra of Rama
- Om̐ āim hrīm śrīm klīm - a mantra of the goddess in Shaktism
- The various mantras associated with the yogic Sūryanamaskāra (Sun Salutation) practice
- The various versions of the Gayatri
- So 'haṃ (I am He or I am That)

==== In the Shiva Sutras ====
Apart from Shiva Sutras, which originated from Shiva's tandava dance, the Shiva Sutras of Vasugupta are a collection of seventy-seven aphorisms that form the foundation of the tradition of spiritual mysticism known as Kashmir Shaivism. They are attributed to the sage Vasugupta of the 9th century C.E. Sambhavopaya (1–1 to 1–22), Saktopaya (2–1 to 2–10) and Anavopaya (3–1 to 3–45) are the main sub-divisions, three means of achieving God consciousness, of which the main technique of Saktopaya is a mantra. But "mantra" in this context does not mean incantation or muttering of some sacred formula. The word "mantra" is used here in its etymological signification. That which saves one by pondering over the light of Supreme I-consciousness is a mantra. The divine Supreme I-consciousness is the dynamo of all the mantras. Deha or body has been compared to wood, "mantra" has been compared to arani—a piece of wood used for kindling fire by friction; prana has been compared to fire. Sikha or flame has been compared to atma (Self); ambara or sky has been compared to Shiva. When prana is kindled by means of mantra used as arani, fire in the form of udana arises in susumna, and then just as flame arises out of kindled fire and gets dissolved in the sky, so also atma (Self) like a flame having burnt down the fuel of the body, gets absorbed in Shiva.

== Buddhism ==
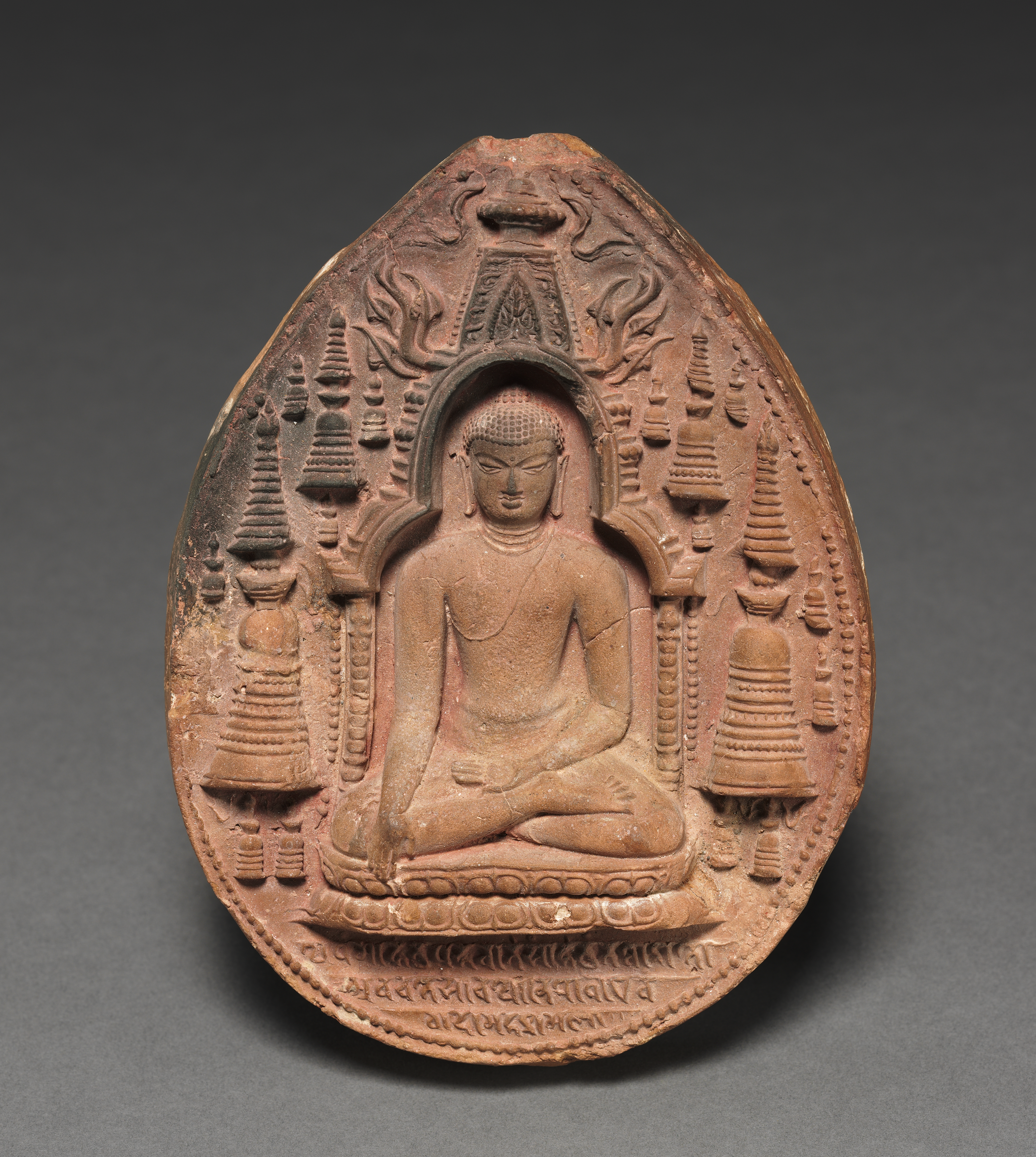
Votive plaque with Ye Dharma Hetu at the bottom.

=== In Early Buddhism ===
One of the most ancient Buddhist mantras is the famous Pratītyasamutpāda-gāthā, also known as the dependent origination dhāraṇī. This phrase is said to encapsulate the meaning of the Buddha's Teaching. It was a popular Buddhist verse and was used as a mantra. This mantra is found inscribed on numerous ancient Buddhist statues, chaityas, and images.

The Sanskrit version of this mantra is:

ye dharmā hetuprabhavā hetuṃ teṣāṃ tathāgato hyavadat, teṣāṃ ca yo nirodha evaṃvādī mahāśramaṇaḥ

The phrase can be translated as follows:

Of those phenomena which arise from causes: Those causes have been taught by the Tathāgata (Buddha), and their cessation too - thus proclaims the Great Ascetic.

Early Buddhist texts also contain various apotropaic chants which have similar functions to Vedic mantras. These are called parittas in Pali (Sanskrit: paritrana) and mean "protection, safeguard". They are still chanted in Theravada Buddhism to this day as a way to heal, protect from danger and bless. Some of these are short Buddhist texts, like the Mangala Sutta, Ratana Sutta, and the Metta Sutta.

=== Theravada ===
According to the American Buddhist teacher Jack Kornfield:

The use of mantra or the repetition of certain phrases in Pali is a highly common form of meditation in the Theravada tradition. Simple mantras use repetition of the Buddha's name, "Buddho", [as "Buddho" is actually a title rather than a name] or use the "Dhamma", or the "Sangha", the community, as mantra words. Other used mantras are directed toward developing loving kindness. Some mantras direct attention to the process of change by repeating the Pali phrase that means "everything changes", while other mantras are used to develop equanimity with phrases that would be translated, "let go".

"In contemporary Theravada practice, mantra practice is often combined with breathing meditation, so that one recites a mantra simultaneously with in-breath and out-breath to help develop tranquility and concentration. Mantra meditation is especially popular among lay people. Like other basic concentration exercises, it can be used simply to the mind, or it can be the basis for an insight practice where the mantra becomes the focus of observation of how life unfolds, or an aid in surrendering and letting go."

The "Buddho" mantra, first occurring in the Suttas and rooted in the Pāli commentarial tradition, is widespread in the Thai Forest Tradition and was taught by Ajahn Chah and his students. Another popular mantra in Thai Buddhism is Samma-Araham, referring to the Buddha who has 'perfectly' (samma) attained 'perfection in the Buddhist sense' (araham), used in Dhammakaya meditation.

In the Tantric Theravada tradition of Southeast Asia, mantras are central to their method of meditation. Popular mantras in this tradition include Namo Buddhaya ("Homage to the Buddha") and Araham ("Worthy One"). There are Thai Buddhist amulet katha: that is, mantras to be recited while holding an amulet.

=== Mahayana Buddhism ===
Letter A in Siddham script, the seed mantra of Prajñaparamita in Mahayana Buddhism

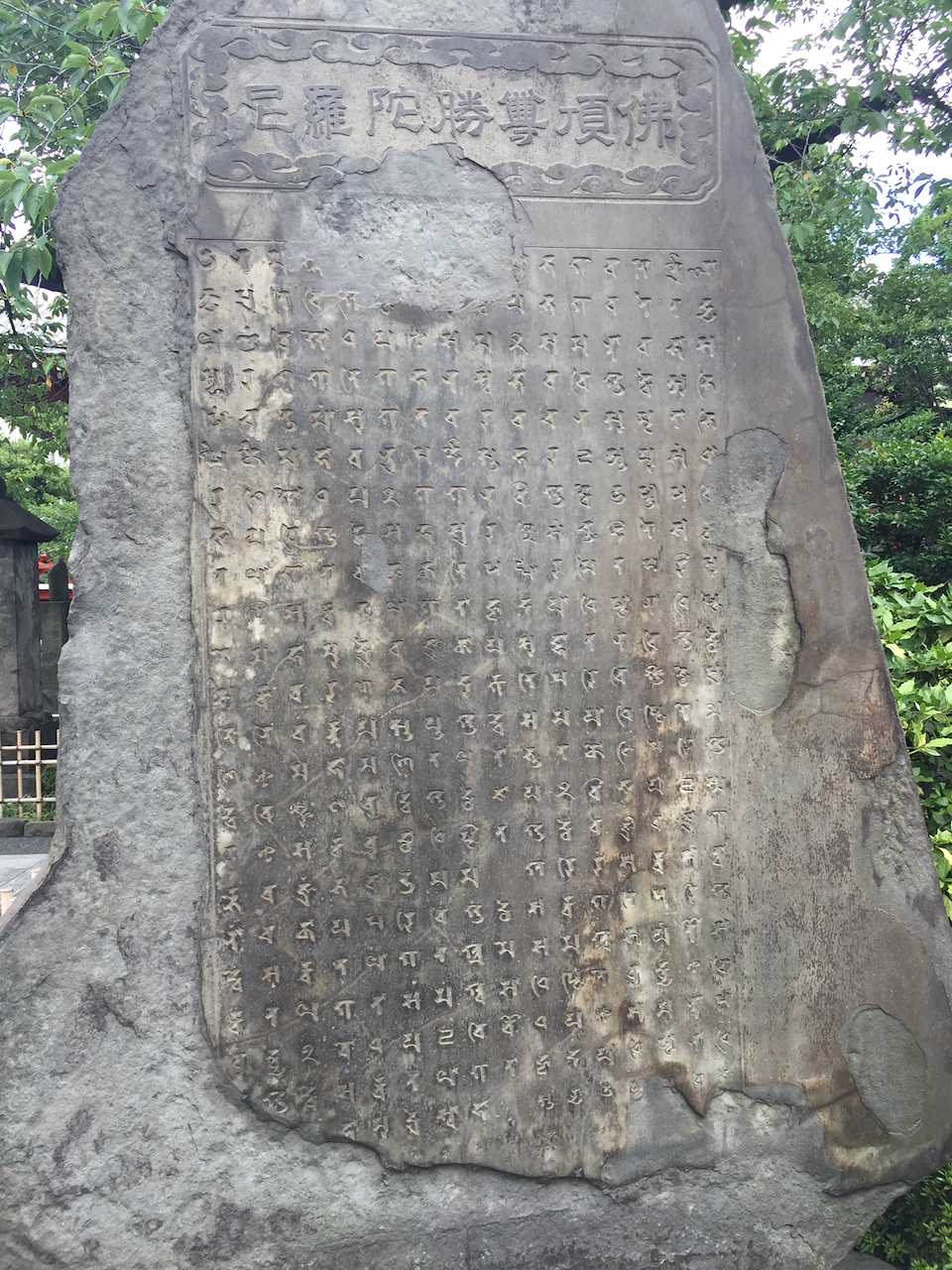
A stone inscription of the Buddhist "Uṣṇīṣa Vijaya Dhāraṇī" in Siddhaṃ script at Asakusa Temple in Tokyo.

The use of mantras became very popular with the rise of Mahayana Buddhism. Many Mahayana sutras contain mantras, bijamantras ("seed" mantras), dharanis and other similar phrases which were chanted or used in meditation.

According to Edward Conze, Buddhists initially used mantras as protective spells like the Ratana Sutta for apotropaic reasons. Even at this early stage, there was an idea that these spells were somehow connected with the Dharma in a deep sense. Conze argues that in Mahayana sutras like the White Lotus Sutra, and the Lankavatara Sutra, mantras become more important for spiritual reasons and their power increases. For Conze, the final phase of the development of Buddhist mantras is the tantric phase of Mantrayana. In this tantric phase, mantras are at the very center of the path to Buddhahood, acting as a part of the supreme method of meditation and spiritual practice.

One popular bija (seed) mantra in Mahayana Buddhism is the Sanskrit letter A (see A in Buddhism). This seed mantra was equated with Mahayana doctrines like Prajñaparamita (the Perfection of Wisdom), emptiness and non-arising. This seed mantra remains in use in Shingon, Dzogchen and Rinzai Zen. Mahayana Buddhism also adopted the Om mantra, which is found incorporated into various Mahayana Buddhist mantras (like the popular Om Mani Padme Hum).

Another early and influential Mahayana "mantra" or dharani is the Arapacana alphabet (of non-Sanskrit origin, possibly Karosthi) which is used as a contemplative tool in the Long Prajñāpāramitā sutras. The entire alphabet runs:

a ra pa ca na la da ba ḍa ṣa va ta ya ṣṭa ka sa ma ga stha ja śva dha śa kha kṣa sta jña rta ha bha cha sma hva tsa bha ṭha ṇa pha ska ysa śca ṭa ḍha

In this practice, each letter stood for a specific idea (for example, "a" stands for non-arising (anutpada), and pa stands for "ultimate truth" (paramārtha). As such, this practice was also a kind of mnemonic technique (dhāraṇīmukha) which allowed one to remember the key points of the teaching.

The Mahayana sutras introduced various mantras into Mahayana Buddhism, such as:

- Mahayana sutras or texts often begin with the mantra: Om̐ namaḥ sarvajñāya (or just: namaḥ sarvajñāya, "Homage to omniscience")
- Other Mahayana texts begin with Om̐ namo ratnatrayāya (Homage to the Three Jewels)
- Shakyamuni Buddha's Mantra: Om̐ muni muni mahāmuni śākyamuni svāhā
- Heart sutra (Prajñāpāramitāhṛdaya) mantra: Gate gate pāragate pārasaṃgate bodhi svāhā
- The mantra of bodhisattva Mañjuśrī: Om̐ arapacana dhīḥ
- Prajñaparamita-devi mantra from The Sutra of Mañjuśrī's Questions: Nama ārya prajñā pāramitāyāi svāhā
- Kauśikaprajñāpāramitāsutra contains many Prajñaparamita mantras including: oṃ hrī śrī dhī śruti smṛti mati gati vijaye svāhā
- A protective mantra found in the Sanskrit Lotus Sutra: agaṇe gaṇe gauri gandhāri caṇḍāli mātaṅgi pukkasi saṃkule vrūsali sisi svāhā
- Medicine Guru mantra (in the Sutra of Medicine Guru): Om̐ bhaiṣajye bhaiṣajye mahābhaiṣajya-samudgate svāhā
- Avalokiteshvara's mantra (the Mani mantra): Om̐ maṇi padme hūṃ, first appearing in the Kāraṇḍavyūhasūtra (4th-5th century CE)
- Cundī dhāraṇī or mantra also first appeared in the Kāraṇḍavyūhasūtra: namaḥ saptānāṃ samyaksaṃbuddha koṭīnāṃ tadyathā oṃ cale cule cunde svāhā
- Amitabha Sukhavati Dhāraṇī, sometimes called the Pure Land Rebirth Mantra
- Mantra of Light of the Great Consecration (Ch: 大灌頂光真言): Om̐ Amogha Vairocana Mahāmudrā Maṇipadma Jvalapravartāya Hūṃ

=== East Asian Buddhism ===
Illustration of the Śūraṅgama Mantra's "Heart Mantra" (hṛdaya): Oṃ anale anale viśade viśade vīra vajradhare bandha bandhani vajrapāṇi phaṭ hūṃ phaṭ svāhā.

In Chinese Buddhism, various mantras, including the Great Compassion Mantra, the Uṣṇīṣa Vijaya Dhāraṇī from the Uṣṇīṣa Vijaya Dhāraṇī Sutra, the Mahāmāyūrī Vidyārājñī Dhāraṇī, the Heart Sutra and var isious forms of Buddha remembrance are commonly chanted by both monastics and laymen. In China and Vietnam, a set of mantras known as the Ten Small Mantras (Chinese: 十小咒; Pinyin: Shíxiǎozhòu) was established by the monk Yulin (Chinese: 玉琳國師; Pinyin: Yùlín Guóshī), a teacher of the Qing dynasty Shunzhi Emperor (1638 – 1661), for monks, nuns, and laity to chant during morning liturgical services. This set of mantras is still chanted in modern Chinese Buddhism.

Zen Buddhism also makes use of esoteric mantras, a practice which can be traced back to the Tang dynasty. Mantras and dharanis are recited in all Zen traditions, including Japanese Zen, Korean Seon, Chinese Chan and Vietnamese Thien. One of these is the Śūraṅgama Dharani, which has been taught by various modern Chan and Zen monks, such as Venerable Hsuan Hua.

Shaolin temple monks also made use of esoteric mantras and dharani.

==== Chinese Mantrayana and Japanese Shingon ====
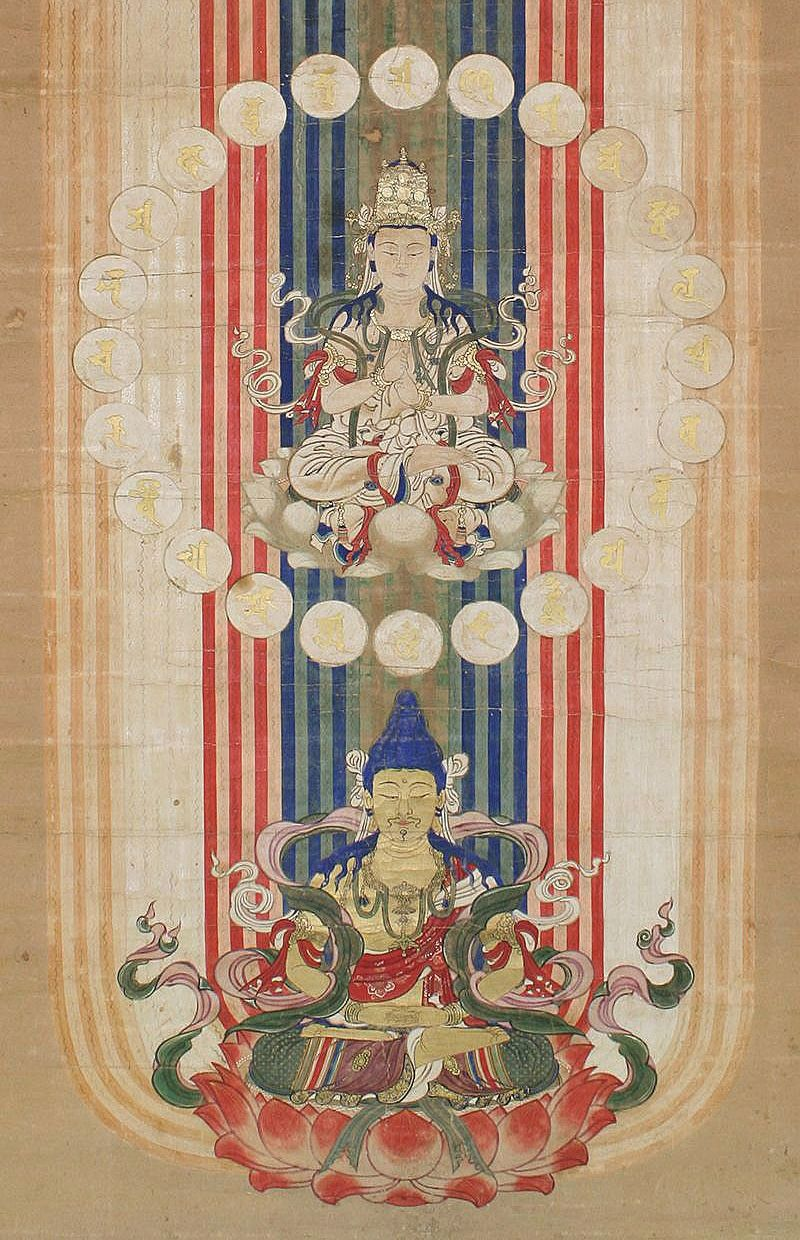
Japanese Mandala of the Mantra of Light, an important mantra of the Shingon and Kegon sects

Chinese Esoteric Buddhism also known as Zhēnyán (Chinese: 真言, lit. "true word", which is the translation for "mantra") draws extensively on mantras. This tradition was established during the Tang dynasty by Indian tantric masters like Śubhakarasiṃha, Vajrabodhi and Amoghavajra. Chinese esoteric Buddhist practice was based on deity yoga and the "three mysteries": mantra, mudra and mandala. These three mysteries allow the Buddhist yogi to tap into the body, speech and mind of the Buddhas.

This tradition was transmitted to Japan by Kūkai (774–835), who founded the Japanese Shingon (Japanese for Zhēnyán) mantra vehicle. Kūkai saw a mantra as a manifestation of the true nature of reality which is saturated with meaning. For Kūkai, a mantra is nothing but the speech of the Buddha Mahavairocana, the "ground dharmakaya" which is the ultimate source of all reality. According to Kūkai, Shingon mantras contain the entire meaning of all the scriptures and indeed the entire universe (which is itself the sermon of the Dharmakaya). Kūkai argues that mantras are effective because: "a mantra is suprarational; It eliminates ignorance when meditated upon and recited. A single word contains a thousand truths; One can realize Suchness here and now."

In this system of thought, all sounds are said to originate from "a". For esoteric Buddhism "a" has a special function because it is associated with Shunyata or the idea that no thing exists in its own right, but is contingent upon causes and conditions. The letter a is both visualised in the Siddham script and pronounced in rituals and meditation practices. In the Mahavairocana Sutra which is central to Shingon Buddhism it says: "Thanks to the original vows of the Buddhas and Bodhisattvas, a miraculous force resides in the mantras, so that by pronouncing them one acquires merit without limits".

===== Main Shingon Mantras =====
A Japanese depiction of the Amida Triad as Seed Syllables (in Siddham Script). Visualizing deities in the form of seed mantras is a common Vajrayana meditation. In Shingon, one of the most common practices is Ajikan (阿字觀), meditating on the mantric syllable A.

There are thirteen mantras used in Shingon Buddhism, each dedicated to a major deity (the "thirteen Buddhas" - jūsanbutsu - of Shingon). The mantras are drawn from the Vairocanābhisaṃbodhi Sūtra. The mantra for each deity name in Japanese, its equivalent name in Sanskrit, the Sanskrit mantra, and the Japanese version in the Shingon tradition are as follows:

1. Fudōmyōō (不動明王, Acala): Sanskrit: namaḥ samanta vajrāṇāṃ caṇḍa mahāroṣaṇa sphoṭaya hūṃ traṭ hāṃ māṃ (Shingon transliteration: nōmaku samanda bazaratan senda makaroshada sowataya untarata kanman)
2. Shaka nyorai (釈迦如来, Sakyamuni): namaḥ samanta buddhānāṃ bhaḥ (nōmaku sanmanda bodanan baku)
3. Monju bosatsu (文殊菩薩, Manjushri): oṃ a ra pa ca na (on arahashanō)
4. Fugen bosatsu (普賢菩薩, Samantabhadra): oṃ samayas tvaṃ (on sanmaya satoban)
5. Jizō bosatsu (地蔵菩薩, Ksitigarbha): oṃ ha ha ha vismaye svāhā (on kakaka bisanmaei sowaka)
6. Miroku bosatsu (弥勒菩薩, Maitreya): oṃ maitreya svāhā (on maitareiya sowaka)
7. Yakushi nyorai (薬師如来, Bhaisajyaguru): oṃ huru huru caṇḍāli mātangi svāhā (on korokoro sendari matōgi sowaka)
8. Kanzeon bosatsu (観世音菩薩, Avalokitesvara): oṃ ārolik svāhā (on arorikya sowaka)
9. Seishi bosatsu (勢至菩薩, Mahasthamaprapta): oṃ saṃ jaṃ jaṃ saḥ svāhā (on san zan saku sowaka)
10. Amida nyorai (阿弥陀如来, Amitabha): oṃ amṛta teje hara hūṃ (on amirita teisei kara un)
11. Ashuku nyorai (阿閦如来, Akshobhya): oṃ akṣobhya hūṃ (on akishubiya un)
12. Dainichi nyorai (大日如来, Vairocana): oṃ a vi ra hūṃ khaṃ vajradhātu vaṃ (on abiraunken basara datoban)
13. Kokūzō bosatsu (虚空蔵菩薩, Akashagarbha): namo ākāśagarbhāya oṃ ārya kāmāri mauli svāhā (nōbō akyashakyarabaya on arikya mari bori sowaka)

==== Other Japanese Buddhist traditions ====
Mantras are also an important element of other Japanese Buddhist traditions. The Tendai school includes extensive repertoire of Esoteric Buddhist practices, which include the use of mantras.

Nichiren Buddhist practice focuses on the chanting of one single mantra or phrase: Nam Myōhō Renge Kyō (南無妙法蓮華経, which means "Homage to the Lotus Sutra").

Japanese Zen also makes use of mantras. One example is the Mantra of Light (kōmyō shingon), which is common in Japanese Soto Zen and was derived from the Shingon sect. The use of esoteric practices (such as mantra) within Zen is sometimes termed "mixed Zen" (kenshū zen 兼修禪). Keizan Jōkin (1264–1325) is seen as a key figure that introduced this practice into the Soto school. A common mantra used in Soto Zen is the Śūraṅgama mantra (Ryōgon shu 楞嚴呪; T. 944A).

=== In Northern Vajrayana Buddhism ===
Mantrayana (Sanskrit), which may be translated as "way of the mantra", was the original self-identifying name of those that have come to be determined 'Nyingmapa'.

==== Om mani padme hum ====
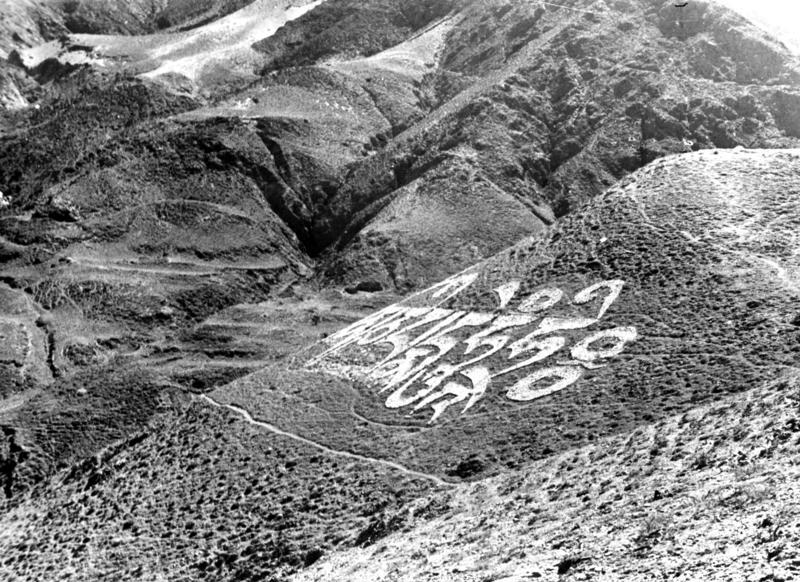
Om mani padme hum on the Gangpori (photo 1938–1939 German expedition to Tibet.

The mantra of Padmasambhava (Om Āḥ Hūṁ Vajra Guru Padma Siddhi Hūṁ), in Lanydza (Ranjana) and Tibetan script.

==== Other ====
The following list of mantras is from Kailash: A Journal of Himalayan Studies, Volume 1, Number 2, 1973. (pp. 168–169) (augmented by other contributors). The mantras used in Tibetan Buddhist practice are in Sanskrit, to preserve the original mantras. Visualizations and other practices are usually done in the Tibetan language.

- Om vagishvara hum This is the mantra of the Mahabodhisattva Manjusri, Tibetan: Jampelyang (Wylie "'jam dpal dbyangs")... The Buddha in his wisdom aspect.
- Om vajrasattva hum The short mantra for White Vajrasattva, there is also a 100-syllable mantra for Vajrasattva.
- Om vajrapani namo hum The mantra of the Buddha as Protector of the Secret Teachings. i.e.: as the Mahabodhisattva Channa Dorje (Vajrapani).
- Om ah hum vajra guru padma siddhi hum The mantra of the Vajraguru Guru Padma Sambhava who established Mahayana Buddhism and Tantra in Tibet.
- Om tare tuttare ture mama ayurjnana punye pushting svaha The mantra of Dölkar or White Tara, the emanation of Arya Tara [Chittamani Tara]. Variants: Om tare tuttare ture mama ayurjnana punye pushting kuru swaha (Drikung Kagyu), Om tare tuttare ture mama ayu punye jnana puktrim kuru soha (Karma Kagyu).

Om Tare Tutare Ture Soha.

- Om tare tuttare ture svaha, mantra of Green Arya Tara—Jetsun Dolma or Tara, the Mother of the Buddhas: om represents Tara's sacred body, speech, and mind. Tare means liberating from all discontent. Tutare means liberating from the eight fears, the external dangers, but mainly from the internal dangers, the delusions. Ture means liberating from duality; it shows the "true" cessation of confusion. Soha means "may the meaning of the mantra take root in my mind."

According to Tibetan Buddhism, this mantra (Om tare tutare ture soha) can not only eliminate disease, troubles, disasters, and karma, but will also bring believers blessings, longer life, and even the wisdom to transcend one's circle of reincarnation. Tara representing long life and health.

- Oṃ amaraṇi jīvantaye svāhā (Tibetan version: oṃ ā ma ra ṇi dzi wan te ye svā hā) The mantra of the Buddha of limitless life: the Buddha Amitayus (Tibetan Tsépagmed) in celestial form.
- Om dhrung svaha The purification mantra of the mother Namgyalma.
- Om ami dhewa hri The mantra of the Buddha Amitabha (Opagme(d) in Tibetan) of the Western Pureland, his skin the color of the setting sun.
- Om ah ra pa ca na dhih The mantra of the "sweet-voiced one", Jampelyang (Wylie "'jam dpal dbyangs") or Manjusri, the Bodhisattva of wisdom.
- Om muni muni maha muniye sakyamuni svaha The mantra of Buddha Sakyamuni, the historical Buddha
- Om gate gate paragate parasamgate bodhi svaha The mantra of the Heart of the Perfection of Wisdom Sutra (Heart Sutra)
- Namo bhagavate Bhaishajya-guru vaidurya-praba-rajaya tathagataya arhate samyak-sambuddhaya tadyata *Tadyata OM bhaishajye bhaishajye maha bhaishajya raja-samudgate svaha The mantra of the 'Medicine Buddha', Bhaiṣajya-guru (or Bhaishajyaguru), from Chinese translations of the Master of Healing Sutra.

=== In Bon ===
There are also numerous mantras in the Bön religion such as Om Ma Tri Mu Ye Sa Le Du.

== Zoroastrianism ==
In Zoroastrianism, the use of mantras, commonly called manthra (Avestan: mąθra), goes back to Zarathustra himself, who describes his role as a prophet of the creator deity Ahura Mazda explicitly as a knower of mantras (Avestan: mąθran; Sanskrit: mántrin). In the Zoroastrian tradition, a mantra is usually a shorter inspired utterance that accompanies religious rituals. They differ from the longer, often eight-syllable praise songs (called yasht in the Avesta) as well as the often eleven-syllable songs (called Gathas in the Avesta as well as in the Vedas).

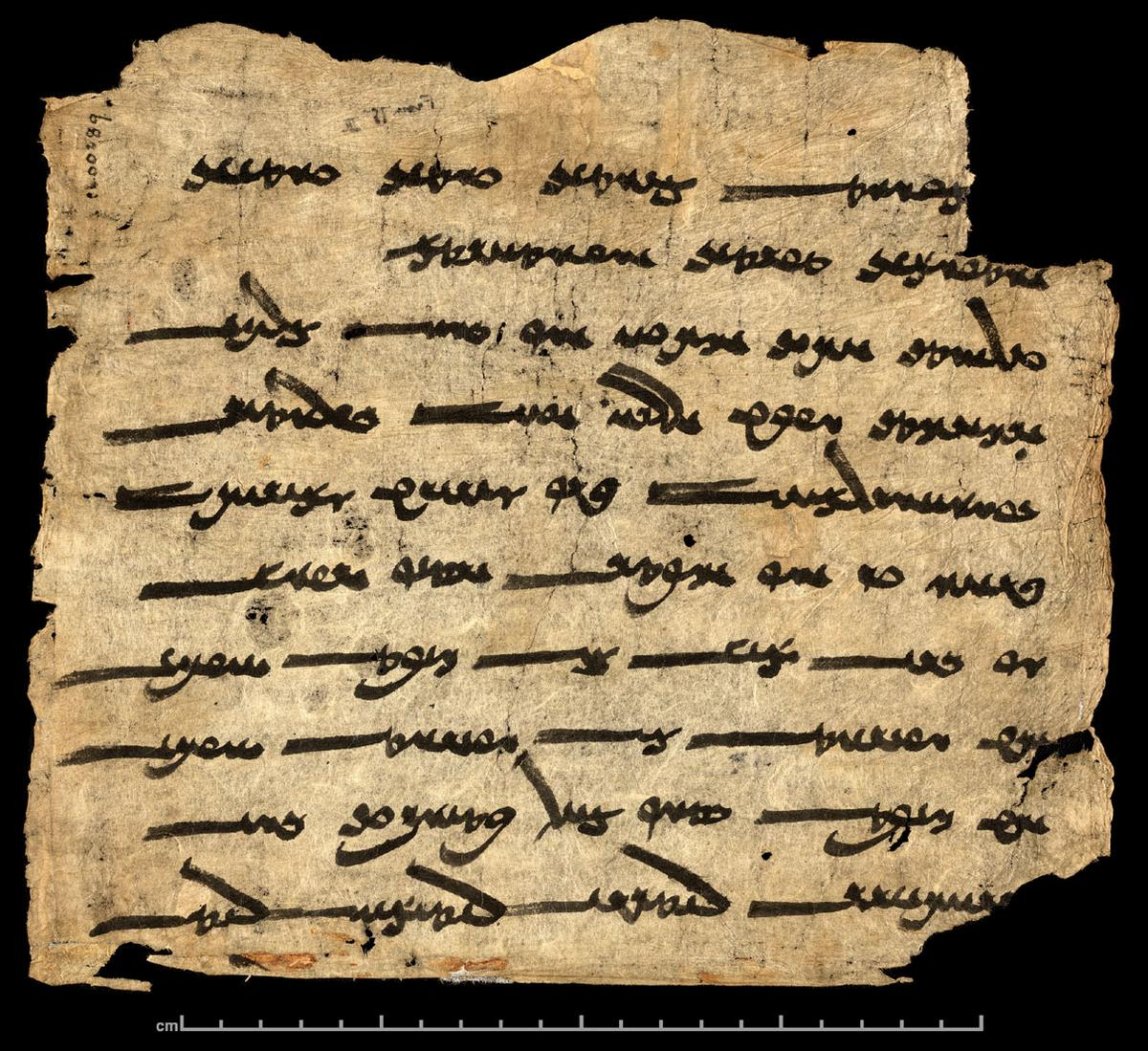
Dunhuang manuscript from the 9th century CE, containing the Ashem vohu mantra in Sogdian.

The four most important Zoroastrian mantras are the Ahuna vairya, the Ashem vohu, the Yenghe hatam, and the Airyaman ishya. The Ashem vohu states:

aṣ̌əm vohū vahištəm astī
uštā astī uštā ahmāi
hyat̰ aṣ̌āi vahištāi aṣ̌əm

Holiness (Asha) is the best of all good:
it is also happiness.
Happy the man who is holy with perfect holiness!

— Ashem vohu.

Both Vedic and Avestan mantras have a number of functional similarities. One of these is the idea that truth, when properly expressed in the mantra, can compel a deity to grant the speaker's request (compare Sacca-kiriya). Another similarity is the Vedic and Avestic association of mantras with paths, so that a properly formulated mantra can open a path to the deity addressed. Because of the etymological and conceptual similarity, such religious utterances must therefore have already been known during the common Indo-Iranian period, when the people of the Avesta and of the Vedas formed a single people. They are, therefore, not derived from the Vedic tradition, but represent an independent development of ancient Iran, corresponding to that in ancient India. The study of their commonalities is therefore important for understanding the poetic and religious traditions of the early Indo-Iranians.

== Jainism ==
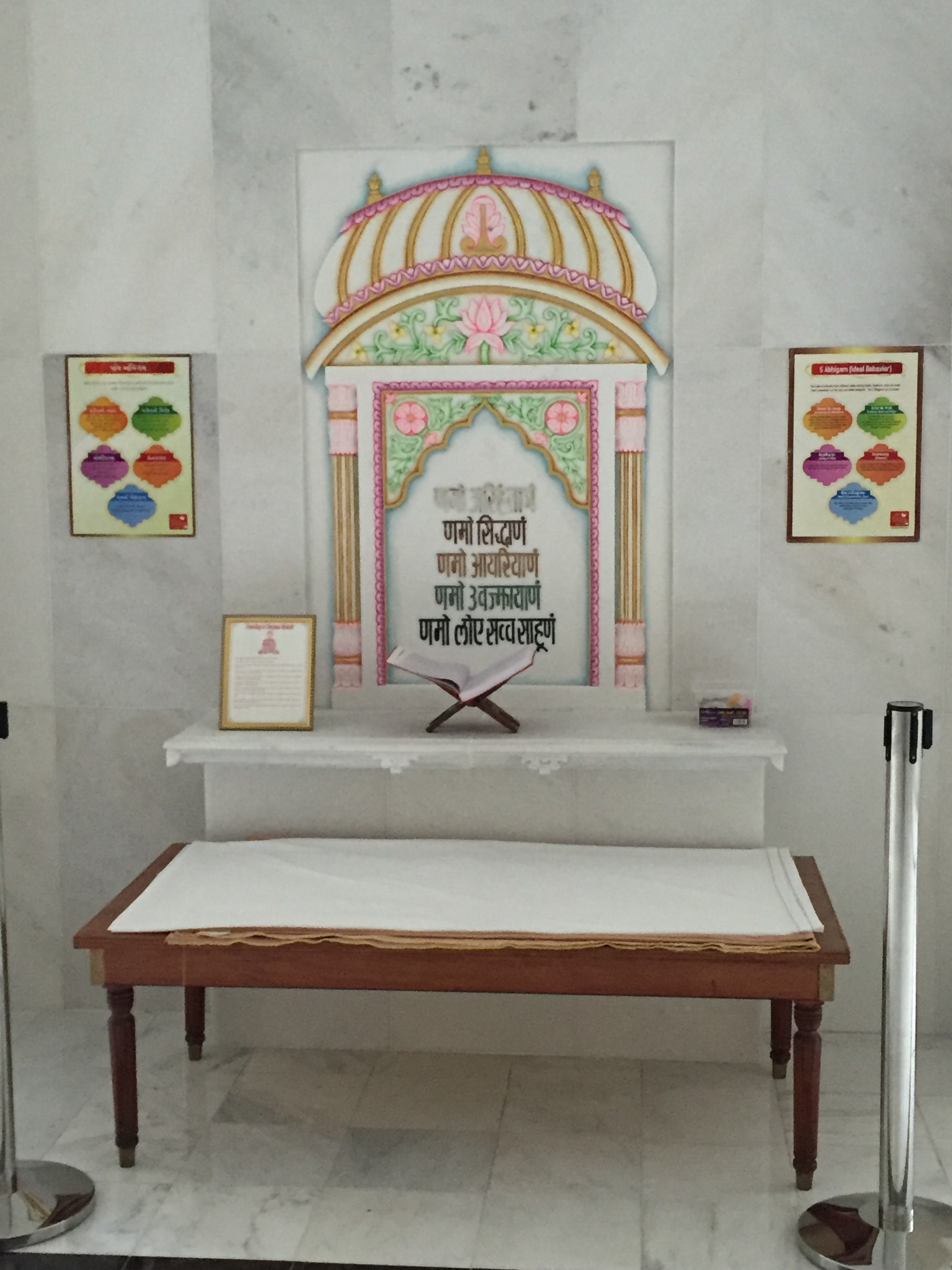
Namokar Mantra shrine at a Jain center in New Jersey

In Jainism mantras are mainly used for praising the omniscient enlightened ones (Arihants), or praising the five supreme types of beings (Pañca-Parameṣṭhi). Some mantras are also used for seeking forgiveness, or to enhance intellect, prosperity, wealth or fame. There are many mantras in Jainism; most of them are in Sanskrit or Prakrit, but in the last few centuries, some have been composed in Hindi or Gujrati languages. Mantras are either chanted or sung aloud or in silence.

=== Namokar ===
Examples of Jain mantras include the Bhaktamara Stotra, Uvasagharam Stotra and Rishi Mandal Mantra. The Namokar Mantra. also known as Navkar Mantra (literally, "Nine Line Mantra") is a central mantra of Jainism. The Mantra is as follows (Prakrit, English):

Namo Arihantânam	I bow to the Arihantâs (Conquerors who showed the path of liberation).
Namo Siddhânam	I bow to the Siddhâs (Liberated Souls).
Namo Âyariyânam	I bow to the Âchâryas (Preceptors or Spiritual Leaders).
Namo Uvajjhâyanam	I bow to the Upadhyâya (Teachers).
Namo Loe Savva Sahûnam	I bow to all the Sadhûs in the world (Saints or Sages).
Eso Panch Namokkaro, Savva Pâvappanâsano, Mangalanam Cha Savvesim, Padhamam Havai Mangalam.	This fivefold salutation (mantra) destroys all sins and of all auspicious mantras, (it) is the foremost.

=== Other recitations ===
In the pratikramana prayer, Jains repeatedly seek forgiveness from various creatures—even from ekindriyas or single sensed beings like plants and microorganisms that they may have harmed while eating and doing routine activities. Pratikraman also contains the following prayer:

Khāmemi savva-jīve savvë jive khamantu me	I ask pardon of all creatures, may all creatures pardon me.
Mitti me savva-bhūesu, veraṃ mejjha na keṇavi	May I have a friendship with all beings and enemy with none.

Forgiveness is asked by uttering the phrase, Micchāmi dukkaḍaṃ. Micchāmi dukkaḍaṃ is a Prakrit phrase literally meaning "may all the evil that has been done be fruitless." In their daily prayers and samayika, Jains recite the Iryavahi sutra in Prakrit, seeking forgiveness from all creatures while involved in routine activities. The prayer includes a confession of harm caused by "walking, coming and going, treading on a living organism,seeds, green grass, dew drops, ant hills, moss, live water, live earth, spider web and others", and seeks forgiveness from these living beings.

== Sikhism ==
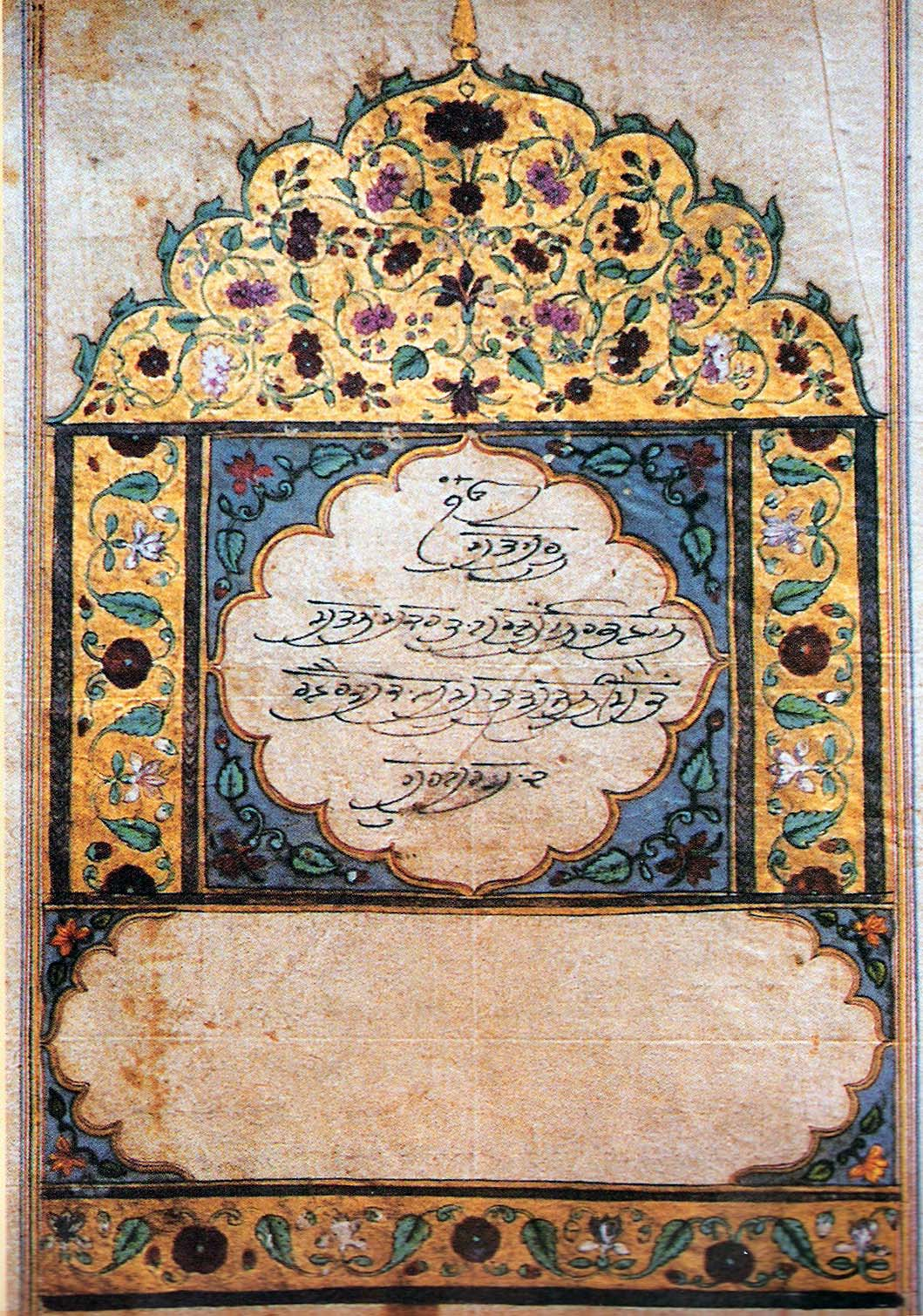
Illuminated Adi Granth folio with Mūl Mantar of Guru Gobind Singh

Mantras in Sikhism are generally recited openly and are used in front of assemblies of Sikhs.

The most widely known mantra in the Sikh faith is "Wahe Guru." According to the Sikh poet Bhai Gurdas, the word "Wahe Guru" is the Gurmantra, or the mantra given by the Guru, and eliminates ego.

== Chinese religions ==
The influence of Chinese Esoteric Buddhism during the Six Dynasties period and the Tang led to the widespread use of Buddhist esoteric practices in other Chinese religions such as Taoism. This included the use of mantras. Mantras are often still used in Chinese Taoism, such as the words in Dàfàn yǐnyǔ wúliàng yīn (大梵隱語無量音), the recitation of a deity's name. Another example of a Taoist mantra is found in one of the most popular liturgies in Taoism (dating from the Tang dynasty), the Pei-tou yen-sheng ching (The North Star Scripture of Longevity), which contains a long mantra called the "North Star Mantra." The text claims that this mantra "can deliver you from disaster," "ward off evil and give you prosperity and longevity," "help you accumulate good deeds" and give you peace of mind.

The Indian syllable om (唵) is also used in Taoist esotericism. After the arrival of Buddhism many Taoist sects started to use Sanskrit syllables in their mantras or talismans, as well as creating some of their own mantras based on Sanskrit to enhance one's spiritual power aside from the traditional Han incantations. One example of this is the "heart mantra" of Pu Hua Tian Zun (普化天尊), a Taoist deity manifested from the first thunder and head of the "36 thunder gods" in orthodox religious Taoism. His mantra is "Ǎn hōng zhā lì sà mó luō - 唵吽吒唎薩嚩囉". Taoist believe this incantation to be the heart mantra of Pu Hua Tian Zun which will protect them from bad qi and calm down emotions. Taoist mantra recitation may also be practiced along with extensive visualization exercises.

There are also mantras in Cheondoism, Daesun Jinrihoe, Jeung San Do and Onmyōdō.

Other Chinese religions have also adopted the use of mantras. These include:

- Námó Tiānyuán Tàibǎo Āmítuófó (南無天元太保阿彌陀佛) The mantra of Xiantiandao and Shengdao in Chinese.
- Wútàifó Mílè (無太佛彌勒) The mantra of Yiguandao in Chinese.
- Guānshìyīn Púsà (觀世音菩薩) The mantra of the Li-ism in Chinese.
- Zhēnkōng jiāxiàng, wúshēng fùmǔ (真空家鄉，無生父母) The mantra of the Luojiao in Chinese.
- Zhōng Shù Lián Míng Dé, Zhèng Yì Xìn Rěn Gōng, Bó Xiào Rén Cí Jiào, Jié Jiǎn Zhēn Lǐ Hé (忠恕廉明德，正義信忍公，博孝仁慈覺，節儉真禮和) The mantra of the Tiender and the Lord of Universe Church in Chinese.
- Qīngjìng Guāngmíng Dàlì Zhìhuì Wúshàng Zhìzhēn Móní Guāngfó (清淨光明大力智慧無上至真摩尼光佛) The mantra of the Manichaeism in Chinese.

== See also ==
- Buddhist chant
- Dharani
- Dhikr
- Jesus Prayer
- Khadgamala
- Kirtan
- Kotodama
- Kuji-in
- Pranava yoga
- Prayer beads
- Prayer of Jabez
- Sandhyavandanam

== Sources ==
- Gelongma Karma Khechong Palmo. Mantras on the Prayer Flag. Kailash: A Journal of Himalayan Studies, Volume 1, Number 2, 1973. (pp. 168–169).
- The Rider Encyclopedia of Eastern Philosophy and religion. (London : Rider, 1986).
- Durgananda, Swami. Meditation Revolution. (Agama Press, 1997). ISBN 0-9654096-0-0
- Vishnu-Devananda, Swami (1981), Meditation and Mantras, Motilal Banarsidass Publishers, ISBN 81-208-1615-3
- Stutley, Margaret; Stutley, James (2002), A Dictionary of Hinduism, Munshiram Manoharlal Publishers, ISBN 81-215-1074-0
