= Justice Hamlin =

Justice Hamlin may refer to:

- Jabez Hamlin (1709–1791), associate justice of the Connecticut Supreme Court of Errors
- Walter B. Hamlin (1898–1984), associate justice of the Louisiana Supreme Court
