= 1 Chronicles 4 =

First Book of Chronicles, chapter 4

- ← chapter 3 chapter 5 →
- The complete Hebrew text of the Books of Chronicles (1 and 2 Chronicles) in the Leningrad Codex (1008 CE).
- Book: Books of Chronicles
- Category: Ketuvim
- Christian Bible part: Old Testament
- Order in the Christian part: 13

1 Chronicles 4 is the fourth chapter of the Books of Chronicles in the Hebrew Bible or the First Book of Chronicles in the Old Testament of the Christian Bible. The book is compiled from older sources by an unknown person or group, designated by modern scholars as "the Chronicler", and had the final shape established in late fifth or fourth century BCE. Together with chapters 2 and 3, this chapter focuses on the descendants of Judah: chapter 2 deals with the tribes of Judah in general, chapter 3 lists the sons of David in particular and chapter 4 concerns the remaining families in the tribe of Judah and the tribe of Simeon, geographically the southernmost west-Jordanian tribe. These chapters belong to the section focusing on the list of genealogies from Adam to the lists of the people returning from exile in Babylon (1 Chronicles 1:1 to 9:34).

== Text ==
This chapter was originally written in the Hebrew language. It is divided into 43 verses.

=== Textual witnesses ===
Some early manuscripts containing the text of this chapter in Hebrew are of the Masoretic Text tradition, which includes the Aleppo Codex (10th century), and Codex Leningradensis (1008).

There is also a translation into Koine Greek known as the Septuagint, made in the last few centuries BCE. Extant ancient manuscripts of the Septuagint version include Codex Vaticanus (B; $\mathfrak{G}$^{B}; 4th century), and Codex Alexandrinus (A; $\mathfrak{G}$^{A}; 5th century). (Note: The extant Codex Sinaiticus only contains 1 Chronicles 9:27–19:17.)

=== Old Testament references ===
- 1 Chronicles 4:24: Genesis 46:10; Exodus 6:15; Numbers 26:12–13
- 1 Chronicles 4:28–32: Joshua 19:2–7

== Structure ==
The whole chapter belongs to an arrangement comprising 1 Chronicles 2:3–8:40 with the king-producing tribes of Judah (David; 2:3–4:43) and Benjamin (Saul; 8:1–40) bracketing the series of lists as the priestly tribe of Levi (6:1–81) anchors the center, in the following order:

A David’s royal tribe of Judah (2:3–4:43)

B Northern tribes east of Jordan (5:1–26)

X The priestly tribe of Levi (6:1–81)

B' Northern tribes west of Jordan (7:1–40)

A' Saul’s royal tribe of Benjamin (8:1–40)

Another concentric arrangement focuses on David's royal tribe of Judah (2:3–4:23), centering on the family of Hezron, Judah's grandson, through his three sons: Jerahmeel, Ram, and Chelubai (Caleb), as follows:

A Descendants of Judah: Er, Onan, and Shelah (2:3–8)

B Descendants of Ram up to David (2:9–17)

C Descendants of Caleb (2:18–24)

D Descendants of Jerahmeel (2:25–33)
D' Descendants of Jerahmeel (2:34–41)

C' Descendants of Caleb (2:42–55)

B' Descendants of Ram following David [David’s descendants] (3:1–24)

A' Descendants of Shelah, Judah s only surviving son (4:21–23)

== Descendants of Judah (4:1–8) ==
This section, continued in verses 11–23, consists of 'many small, seemingly unrelated pieces' with little textual clarity, which potentially could be a valuable historical source, although it is difficult to interpret. These lists partly refer back to chapter 2. A number of prominent women are listed here (as well as in the latter parts):

- Hazzelelponi, daughter of Etam
- Ephrathah, mother of Hur and grandmother of Bethlehem
- Helah and Naarah, the two wives of Asshur (verse 5)
- Mother of Jabez, not mentioned by name (verse 9)

=== Verse 2 ===
And Reaiah the son of Shobal begat Jahath; and Jahath begat Ahumai, and Lahad. These are the families of the Zorathites.

- "Reaiah": written as "Haroeh" in 1 Chronicles 2:52
- "Shobal": is called "Shobal the father of Kirjathjearim" in 1 Chronicles 2:52.

== Prayer of Jabez (4:9–10) ==
These two verses form a unique passage highlighting the Chronicler's respect for wealth and the effectiveness of prayer. It shows one example of the Chronicler's frequent use of meaningful names: "Jabez" (יַעְבֵּץ֙, ya‘-bêz) was given that name because his mother bore him with sorrow (בְּעֹֽצֶב, bə-‘ō-zeḇ, meaning "in pain"; verse 9), while he himself prays that no sorrow' (עָצְבִּ֑י, ‘ā-zə-bî; verse 10) would fall upon him.

== More descendants of Judah (4:11–23) ==
Together with verses 1–8, this section partly refers back to chapter 2. Some prominent women are listed here (other than in the previous parts):

- Bithiah: "daughter of Pharaoh, whom Mered married" (verse 18)
- Miriam, a daughter (verse 17)
- Mered's Judahite wife, not mentioned by name (or the name is "Jehudijah" according to KJV and NKJV; verse 18)
- The wife of Hodiah, the sister of Naham (verse 19)

== Descendants of Simeon (4:24–43) ==
This section focuses on the tribe of Simeon, which had constant close ties with Judah (such as in Joshua 19:1, 9; Judges 1:3–4) and historically was quickly engulfed by the descendants of Judah. In contrast to the previous parts in the same chapter, it has an obvious structure: the genealogy (verses 24–27; drawn from Genesis 46:10 and Exodus 6:15) is followed by the lists of the tribe's settlement territories (verses 28–33, drawn from Joshua 19:1–9), the leaders (verses 34–38) and two events in their history, when the tribe pushed out the Meunites and Amalekites to expand the territories for their flocks (verses 39–43). The tribe's warlike attitude correlates to the characterization in Genesis 34, 49:5–7, and Judges 9:2.

=== Verse 31 ===
Beth Marcaboth, Hazar Susim, Beth Biri, and at Shaaraim. These were their cities until the reign of David.

- "Hazar Susim": is written as "Hazar Susah" in Joshua 19:5.
- "Until the reign of David": or "until David became king", an emphasis by the Chronicler that the engulfing of the tribe of Simeon by Judah happened during David's reign (if not before).

== See also ==
- Chronology of the Bible
- Davidic line
- Tree of Jesse
- Related Bible parts: 1 Chronicles 2, 2 Chronicles 30, Matthew 6

== Sources ==
- Ackroyd, Peter R (1993). "Chronicles, Books of". In Metzger, Bruce M; Coogan, Michael D (eds.). The Oxford Companion to the Bible. Oxford University Press. pp. 113–116. ISBN 978-0195046458.
- Bennett, William (2018). The Expositor's Bible: The Books of Chronicles. Litres. ISBN 978-5040825196.
- Coogan, Michael David (2007). Coogan, Michael David; Brettler, Marc Zvi; Newsom, Carol Ann; Perkins, Pheme (eds.). The New Oxford Annotated Bible with the Apocryphal/Deuterocanonical Books: New Revised Standard Version, Issue 48 (Augmented 3rd ed.). Oxford University Press. ISBN 9780195288810.
- Endres, John C. (2012). First and Second Chronicles. Liturgical Press. ISBN 9780814628447.
- Gilbert, Henry L (1897). "The Forms of the Names in 1 Chronicles 1-7 Compared with Those in Parallel Passages of the Old Testament". The American Journal of Semitic Languages and Literatures. 13 (4). Liturgical Press: 279–298. doi:10.1086/369250. JSTOR 527992.
- Hill, Andrew E. (2003). First and Second Chronicles. Zondervan. ISBN 9780310206101.
- Mabie, Frederick (2017). "I. The Chronicler's Genealogical Survey of All Israel". In Longman III, Tremper; Garland, David E (eds.). 1 and 2 Chronicles. The Expositor's Bible Commentary. Zondervan. pp. 267–308. ISBN 978-0310531814.
- Mathys, H. P. (2007). "14. 1 and 2 Chronicles". In Barton, John; Muddiman, John (eds.). The Oxford Bible Commentary (first (paperback) ed.). Oxford University Press. pp. 267–308. ISBN 978-0199277186.
- Tuell, Steven S. (2012). First and Second Chronicles. Westminster John Knox Press. ISBN 978-0664238650.
- Throntveit, Mark A. (2003). "Was the Chronicler a Spin Doctor? David in the Books of Chronicles". Word & World. 23 (4): 374–381.
- Ulrich, Eugene, ed. (2010). The Biblical Qumran Scrolls: Transcriptions and Textual Variants. Brill.
- Würthwein, Ernst (1995). The Text of the Old Testament. Translated by Rhodes, Erroll F. Grand Rapids, MI: William B. Eerdmans. ISBN 0-8028-0788-7.
