= Isaac Jabez =

16th-century physician and rabbi in Thessaloniki

Rabbi Isaac Jabez (also known as Yitzchak Yaavetz and Hachasid Yaavetz -- Hebrew: רבי יצחק יעבץ) (died 7th Tevet 5308 / 29 November 1547) was a physician and rabbi in Thessaloniki.

== Biography ==
Rabbi Isaac Jabez was the son of Rabbi Joseph ben Hayyim Jabez, who had been exiled with the expulsion from Spain and was renowned for being an opponent of philosophy. He was the son-in-law of the Kabbalist Rabbi Yehosef ibn Shraga of Padua, from whom he also learned Torah.

He was a doctor in Padua, and also studied there with Judah Minz. He stated that he saw him recite the Birkat Hachama in the year 5265 (1492), when he was about 100 years old.

Rabbi Yitzchak served as a rabbi in Thessaloniki, and was considered one of the Gedolei Hador (greatest of his generation), as we see from his response to a question about reciting "The Lord, your God, is true" which appears in the book "Be'er Maim Chaim" of Haim Ovadia di Bushal, who signed it together with other rabbis of the time, including Jacob ibn Habib, Maharash Charlivo, Moses Arama and others.

His grandson, also called Rabbi Isaac Jabez, wrote about him in the Hasdei Avot. He is mentioned by Abraham Khalfon in "Ma'aseh Tzadikim": "Once Rabbi Isaac Jabez the elder was judging a certain matter. The head of the community approached and intimated to him a certain thing. His intention was to flatter him. Immediately, when he saw that he had alluded to this matter, he became very angry. Nevertheless, he ruled according to the truth. He said to the people of his congregation, 'Know, gentlemen, that this was the incident. And from now on choose new judges for yourselves and teachers of Torah.' He swore an oath that he did not want this. Blessed is he and blessed is the one who gave birth to him."

In "Machzor Hagadol for All the Year", It is written: "Also the artisan brothers... Solomon... and the dear Rabbi Joseph Jabez... At the beginning of the work, their old father was still alive... Rabbi Isaac Jabez ... was the father of every master who polishes an iron and lead pen and he stands over them in his great wisdom and understanding, his art and his faith, he was also the corrector and proofreader of all of this work."

Besides writing the introduction to his father's book, Hasdei Hashem, he authored an article called "Reading the Shema Precisely, its Words and its Letters". The piece was partially printed under his father's name.

== Descendants ==
His children were Rabbi Solomon and Rabbi Joseph, who were printers and together established a printing house in 5303 (1543) in Thessaloniki and later printed the Talmud in a press they established in Constantinople.

Rabbi Solomon's son, Rabbi Isaac Jabez, authored the books: "Chasdei Avot" (Constantinople 5343) which is a commentary on Pirkei Avot; "Yafek Ratzon (Constantinople 5353), which is a commentary on the Haftara according to both the Sephardi and Ashkenazi tradition; "Torat Chesed" (Belvedere, 5354) which is a commentary on the Five Megillot, Psalms, Book of Ruth and Book of Job.

He died on 7th of Tevet, 5308 and is buried in the old Jewish cemetery in Thessalonika.
