= Joseph ben Hayyim Jabez =

Spanish-Jewish theologian

Joseph ben Hayyim Jabez (also "Yaavetz") (1438 – 1539) was a Spanish-Jewish theologian. He lived for a time in Portugal, where he associated with Joseph ben Abraham Ḥayyun, who inspired him with that taste for mysticism which he subsequently displayed in his writings. When the Jews were banished from Spain Jabez settled at Mantua, Italy. There he met his compatriot, the kabbalist Judah ben Jacob Ḥayyat, whom he induced to write the commentary Minḥat Yehudah on the kabbalistic work Ma'areket Elahut.

Jabez was an opponent of philosophy. For him, the truth of religion is demonstrated by the miracles recorded in the Hebrew Bible. He criticizes the thirteen articles of faith of Maimonides, the six of Hasdai Crescas, and the three of Joseph Albo. According to him, only the following three, alluded to in the verse about "I Am that I Am" in the narrative of the burning bush in the Book of Exodus, are the fundamental principles of Judaism:

1. That God is one
2. That He governs the world
3. That in the end all mankind will believe in His unity

These dogmas are expounded by him in the following books:

- Ḥasde Adonay (Constantinople, 1533), an ethical work wherein the author demonstrates that the wise man is more grateful to God for his misfortunes than for worldly advantages
- Ma'amar ha-Aḥdut (Ferrara, 1554), on the unity of God
- Perush ʿal Masseket Abot (ib. 1555), on the sayings of the Fathers, mentioned by the author of Yesod ha-Emunah
- Or ha-Ḥayyim (ib. 1555), against philosophy
- A commentary on the Psalms (Salonica, 1571)

Jabez also left a great number of manuscript works, which, according to Ghirondi, are still (as of 1906) in the possession of the author's descendants.

Isaac Jabez was his son.

== Jewish Encyclopedia bibliography ==
- David Conforte, Ḳore ha-Dorot, p. 30a;
- Chaim Yosef David Azulai, Shem ha-Gedolim, ii. 4;
- Graziadio Nepi-Mordecai Ghirondi, Toledot Gedole Yisrael, p. 158;
- Adolf Jellinek, in Orient, Lit. vii. 262;
- Moritz Steinschneider, Cat. Bodl. col. 1474;
- Hermann Vogelstein and Paul Rieger, Geschichte der Juden in Rom, ii. 66.
