= Kailash (journal) =

- Discipline: Asian studies
- Language: English

Publication details
- History: 1973–present

Standard abbreviations
- ISO 4: Kailash

Indexing
- ISSN: 0377-7499

Kailash: A Journal of Himalayan Studies is a scholarly journal that started publication in 1973. The journal focuses on the history and anthropology of the Himalayan region. Printed on traditional rice paper in Kathmandu, Nepal, it is difficult to acquire and only a handful of university libraries have assembled a complete set. Some articles are available in PDF or HTML format.
