= Jabez Melville Smith =

Mississippi politician

Jabez Melville Smith (born August 10, 1843 - ?) was a medical doctor and state representative in Mississippi. He was elected to represent Yalobusha County in the Mississippi House of Representatives in 1903. Smith married and had several children.

== Life ==
James Osborn Jeffreys Smith and Martha née Calloway Smith were his parents. Smith served in the Confederate Army and then graduated from Missouri Medical College in 1870. He was a Democrat, Methodist, and a member of the masons. He married Elizabeth Gibbs and had eight children.
