= Jabez Hamlin =

Connecticut politician and judge

Jabez Hamlin (July 28, 1709 – April 25, 1791) was a Connecticut politician and judge who served in the colonial legislature.

== Early life and education ==
Born in Middletown, Connecticut, Hamlin was the ninth and youngest child of Judge John Hamlin, and grandson of the Hon. Giles Hamlin, the first of the name in Connecticut, and one of the earliest settlers in Middletown. His mother was Mary, eldest daughter of the Rev. Nathaniel Collins (Harv. 1660), the first minister of Middletown. He graduated first in his class from Yale College in 1728.

== Political and judicial career ==
He settled in his home town, and as early as 1731 served as deputy in the General Assembly,—a position which he occupied during sixty-five sessions between this date and 1773; in some of the later sessions he was Speaker of the House. He was also a member of the Governor's Council, or Upper House, from 1758 to 1766 (when his sympathy with the course of Governor Thomas Fitch cost him his place), and from 1773 to 1785. In 1752, when Middletown was made a distinct Probate District, he was appointed judge, and held the office until 1789. He was also judge of the Hartford County Court for thirty years from 1754. In the American Revolution he was an active member of the Council of Safety. In the Militia he reached the rank of Colonel.

In Middletown he was by common consent the leading civilian, and when the city was incorporated in 1784, he was elected mayor, and held the office till his death, though having offered his resignation, and for the last three or four years, owing to lameness and other infirmities, being obliged to delegate to subordinates most of the duties.

== Personal life and death ==
He was married four times. On November 19, 1729, he married Mary, daughter of the Hon. Christopher Christophers Jr., of New London, Connecticut, who died April 3, 1736, in her 22d year. On December 6, 1736, he next married Margaret, daughter of Captain George Phillips, of Middletown, Connecticut, who died September 6, 1748.

On April 5, 1749, he had his third marriage to Abigail, third daughter of the Rev. Nathaniel Chauncey (Yale class of 1702), of Durham, Connecticut; she was born October 2, 1717, and died November 3, 1768. He was married a fourth and final time, April 2, 1771, to Susannah, daughter of Roger Newton Jr., and widow of the Rev. Samuel Whittelsey (Yale class of 1729), of Milford, Connecticut. She survived him, dying May 9, 1803, in her 88th year.

By his first marriage he had four children, of whom two daughters survived him; by his second marriage, two sons who died young; and by his third marriage, one son, who was graduated here in 1769, and died in 1776, and two daughters, of whom only one survived him.

He was one of the deacons of the Congregational Church from February, 1754, to his death, at the age of 82.
