= Jabez M. Smith =

American politician

Jabez M. Smith (died 1891) was a state legislator in Arkansas. He was a state senator in the Arkansas Senate from 1866 to 1867. He and his fellow senators were photographed and included in a composite by T. W. Bankes. He chaired the select committee.

He was also delegate to the 1861 Secession Convention in Arkansas, served in the Confederate Army, served as a delegate at the 1874 Arkansas Constitutional Convention, and served as a judge in Arkansas. He acquired the Rowland-Lenz House and his brother David Smith lived there.

He was a delegate at the 1861 secession convention, he voted to leave the Union, He served in the Eleventh Arkansas Infantry of the Confederate Army. The Encyclopedia of Arkansas has a photo of him. He was a delegate to the 1874 Arkansas Constitutional Convention. He became a circuit court judge in Saline County, Arkansas.

Relation to Dr. Jabez Melville Smith (born August 10, 1843) of Coffeeville and then Yalobusha County?

Married Elizabeth Gibbs April 27, 1871.

Correspondence

In 1866, Unionist J. M. Tibbets wrote to him as a senator, withdrawing as a candidate for a U.S. Senate seat.

== See also ==
- Island Number Ten Confederate order of battle
