= Dhammakāyānussati-kathā =

15th-century Pali Buddhist text

Information
- Religion: Theravada Buddhism (Tai-Khmer traditions)
- Author: Attributed to traditional oral lineages
- Language: Pali
- Period: c. 15th century CE (earliest recorded version)
- Chapters: 1 (prose with verses)
- Verses: Varies by manuscript; core text includes homage and recollection verses

The Dhammakāyānussati-kathā (translated as the "Verses on the Recollection of the Dhammakāya"), also known as the Dhammakāya Gāthā and the Dhammakāya text, is a Pali Buddhist text used in meditation practices within Theravada traditions of the Tai-Khmer cultural region, including Thailand, Cambodia and Laos. It focuses on Dhammakāyānussati, the contemplation of the Dhammakāya—described as the "Truth Body" or "Dharma Body" of the Buddha, visualized as a radiant, "resplendent body" essence within the practitioner. The text combines prose instructions with verses to guide visualization and recitation.

Belonging to the esoteric Yogavacara (yoga practitioner) tradition, it is not part of the Pali Canon but reflects meditative practices distinct from mainstream Theravada texts. Its core components include homage to the Buddha and verses extolling the Dhammakāya as a path to liberation.

== History ==
The Dhammakāyānussati-kathā likely originated in the Tai-Khmer Buddhist traditions. Its earliest extant version appears on the "Brah Dhammakaya inscription", an engraved stone slab from the stupa of Wat Suea, Phitsanulok, Thailand, dated to 1549 CE. The kathā text is used in various practices, including "consecration rites for Buddha images and stupas." Scholars propose that this text genre, likely transmitted through oral tradition, is linked to Yogāvacara practices found in the Khmer context and shares similarities with the Visuddhimagga's Buddhānussati meditation.

By the 18th century, and likely earlier, the text genre was circulated in Thailand (Central and Northern) and Cambodia, preserved in manuscripts, inscriptions and printed texts. In the Rattanakosin period, the Dhammakāyānussati-kathā was part of the suat mon plae chanting collection, which Malasart argues was compiled during the reign of King Rāmā I (1782–1809 CE). This text is identified as a trace of "borān" (ancient) Buddhism, associated with pre-modern meditation techniques (borān kammatthāna). Its use declined in Central Thailand during the 5th reign (1868–1910 CE), primarily due to reforms under Supreme Patriarch Sā in 1880, which reformed the royal chanting curriculum, and the revision of Siam's Tipiṭaka in 1893. These reforms excluded texts classified as "non-canonical", which led to the removal of the pakiṇṇaka-gāthā (the section containing the dhammakāyānussati-kathā) from the new official chanting manual.

In the 20th century, a modernized form of borān kammatthāna meditation, known as vijjā dhammakāya, was popularized by the Thai monk Candasaro Sot of Wat Paknam. This practice was subsequently adopted and globally disseminated by the modern Dhammakaya Movement, particularly through the Dhammakaya Foundation and Wat Phra Dhammakaya (established in the 1970s), bringing it into contemporary meditation contexts. The adaptation and simplification of this method, while making it more accessible, has prompted scholarly and monastic debates. Critics, including prominent scholar-monks like Payuth Payutto and the Burmese monk Chodok Yannasittho, have questioned its orthodoxy and the alignment of vijjā dhammakāya with traditional Theravāda teachings, while some Western scholars have proposed Tibetan tantric influence.

== Text and structure ==
The text consists of Pāli verses followed by a Thai translation using the traditional yok sab method. It is identified as belonging to the Dhammakāya text genre, which is associated with Buddhist rituals like buddhābhiṣeka (image consecration). Though there are multiple variants of this kathā, it typically begins with the traditional Pali homage:

Namo Tassa Bhagavato Arahato Sammā-Sambuddhassa.

The structure of this text, particularly the version analyzed in the 1909 Suat Mon Plae (DK 1909), is generally divided into three parts. The first part, termed "personification," identifies the knowledge (ñāṇa) and qualities/virtues (guṇa) of the Buddha with the physical attributes of his body. This involves comparing various aspects of the Buddha's enlightenment and virtues to specific body parts, from head to toe, and even his robes. The second part ("glorification") comprises "verses in praise" glorifying the Buddha's resplendent body understood as the dhammakāya (Buddho ativirocati devamanussānaṃ dhammakāyena). The third section ("summarising") functions as a "summarising meditation guide," exhorting a practitioner within the yogāvacara lineage (one possessing sharp wisdom, tikkhañāṇena) to repeatedly (punappunam) recollect (anussaritabbam) the dhammakāya with the aim of attaining Buddhahood (sabbaññūbuddhabhāvam).

This three-part structure is confirmed by the complete Pāli manuscript versions of the text, such as the one edited by Cœdès and analyzed by Choompolpaisal and Skilton. The first part, the "personification", is an enumerative list that, in its complete manuscript form, contains 26 to 30 items. This list systematically equates the Buddha's physical body parts—from his head down to his feet, as well as his robes—with specific dhamma qualities, the majority of which are specific forms of wisdom (ñāṇa). In its 30-item form, for example, it begins by equating "omniscience" (sabbaññutañāṇa) with "the very best head", "the fourth jhāna" with "the very best forehead", the "navel" as "knowledge of conditioned arising" and the "belt" as "the four foundations of mindfulness". The Phitsanulok inscription itself is incomplete due to damage and preserves only the first seven items of this list.

The subsequent "glorification" and "summarising meditation guide" sections are found in the concluding verses present in the manuscript versions, as the inscription's ending is lost. The glorification verse describes the Buddha who "outshines all other gods and humans", while the meditation guide contains the Pāli exhortation explicitly addressing the yogāvacara (meditation practitioner) to "repeatedly recollect" (punappunam anussaritabbam) these features to attain "the condition of the omniscient Buddha" (sabbaññubuddhabhāvam). Choompolpaisal and Skilton note that the use of these key terms, yogāvacara and sabbaññu (omniscience), "are ubiquitous in boran kammatthan contexts", explicitly linking the text to that pre-reform meditation tradition.

== Practices ==
The primary practice associated with the Dhammakāya Gāthā is the Dhammakāyānussati or "Recollection of the Dhammakāya". This involves the mental recollection or visualization (anussaritabbam) of the dhammakāya as described in the text, particularly its personification as the Buddha's enlightened knowledge and qualities embodied. Since the dhammakāya is presented abstractly, the practice often utilizes a Buddha image as a visual aid, considered a physical embodiment or likeness of the dhammakāya. A traditional Lanna meditation manual (KBG), which includes the Gāthā, provides specific instructions: the practitioner visualizes a Buddha image in a chosen posture, clearly perceives its form and color mentally, and then stabilizes this mental image, placing it either on top of their head or in front of them as the object of concentration.

Another method of recollection involves reciting the textual content of the Dhammakāya Gāthā itself. Paratextual instructions found in Lanna and Lan Xang manuscripts suggest that the text should be remembered by heart and recited (bhāvanā, sometimes mentally) on a daily basis (punappunam interpreted in this context).

The Buddha, whose head is omniscience and so on,
outshines all other gods and humans.
I pay homage to the Buddha, the guide to the world,
who consists of this body of dhammas.
The astute well-born practitioner of meditation desiring the condition
of the omniscient Buddha should repeatedly recollect (punappunam anussaritabbam)
these features of the Buddha that are his body of dhammas.

— Paratextual instructions of the Dhammakāya inscription

In a more ritualistic context associated with Buddha image consecration in Lanna manuscript, the practice involves physically inscribing the Dhammakāya Gāthā (often along with texts detailing the Buddha's major and minor physical marks) onto metal plates. These inscribed plates are then typically rolled, placed inside a casket, and embedded within the Buddha statue, often near the navel, thereby physically installing the dhammakāya into the image.

The stated goals of these practices are both mundane and supramundane. The text itself directs the practitioner (yogāvacara) towards the attainment of Buddhahood (sabbaññūbuddhabhāvam). Paratexts associated with the Gāthā also mention goals such as attaining Nibbāna or Arahatship in the future, as well as securing worldly prosperity, happiness and protection.

== See also ==
- Dhammakaya meditation
- Dhammakaya tradition
- Buddhānussati
- Yogavacara
