= Lung (Tibetan Buddhism) =

Principle of Tibetan Buddhism

Lung (Tibetan: རླུང rlung) means wind or breath. It is a key concept in the Vajrayana traditions of Tibetan Buddhism and has a variety of meanings. Lung is a concept that is particularly important to understandings of the subtle body and the trikaya (body, speech and mind). Traditional Tibetan medicine practitioner Tamdin Sither Bradley provides a summary:

The general description of rLung is that it is a subtle flow of energy and out of the five elements (air, fire, water, earth and space) it is most closely connected with air. However it is not simply the air which we breathe or the wind in our stomachs, it goes much deeper than that. rLung is like a horse and the mind is the rider, if there is something wrong with the horse the rider will not be able to ride properly. Its description is that it is rough, light, cool, thin, hard, movable. The general function of rLung is to help growth, movement of the body, exhalation and inhalation and to aid the function of mind, speech and body. rLung helps to separate in our stomachs what we eat into nutrients and waste products. However its most important function is to carry the movements of mind, speech and body. The nature of rLung is both hot and cold.

== Usages ==
Some of the different usages of the term lung include:

- the psychic winds (sanskrit: prana) that travel in the internal channels, or nadi (Sanskrit) of the subtle body and are manipulated in certain Vajrayana yoga practices.
- specifically the five psychic winds that are a manifestation of the mahābhūta. These five are the lifeforce that animate the bodymind (Sanskrit: namarupa) of all sentient beings and are key to certain tantric Buddhist and Bon sādhanās and traditional Tibetan medicine.
- to the vayu and prana of ayurveda.
- as a component of the term for a type of prayer flag, named after the allegorical Wind Horse (Tibet: lung ta).
- a type of tantric Buddhist empowerment that involves the transference of spiritual power from master to augment or refine that of the disciple through the recitation of scripture or song. This oracular transmission received aurally defines Vajrayana and Ngagpa traditions and provides them with their nomenclature.
- the "reading transmission" of sutrayana texts, in which the entirety of the text is read aloud from teacher to student.

== Traditional Tibetan medicine ==
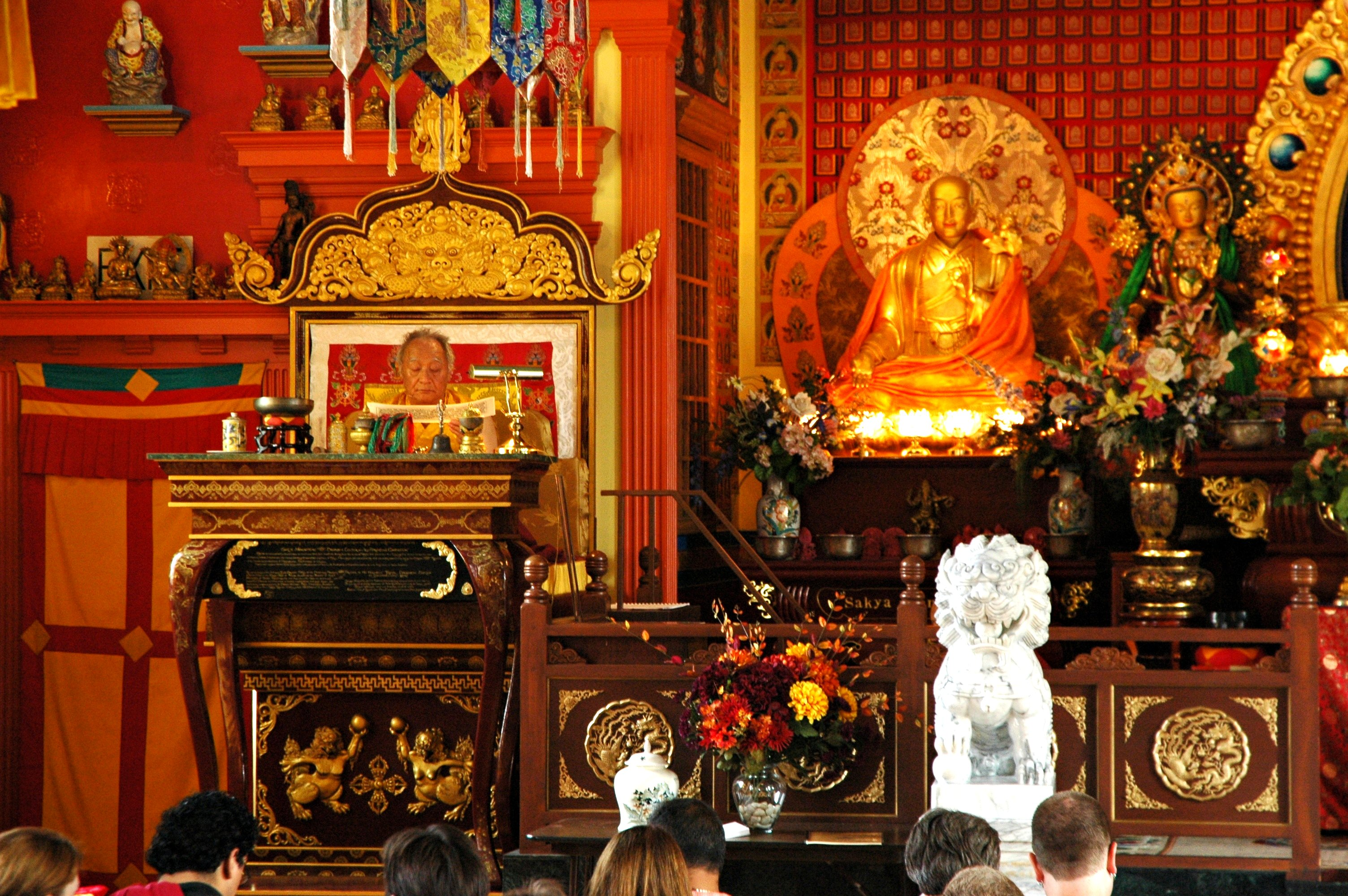
The text being read during an empowerment ceremony - the 'lung'

Traditional Tibetan medicine, a discipline practiced throughout the Himalayas, identifies a system of 'The Five Lung' which help to regulate the human body:

- 'Life-grasping lung' (srog 'dzin rlung) is located in the brain. This lung regulates swallowing, inhalation, spitting, eructation, sneezing, and generally clearing the senses and steadying of the mind and concentration.
- 'Upward moving lung' (gyen-rgyu rlung) is located in the thorax. This lung regulates speech, energy to work, body weight, memory, the increase of bodily vigour and health, complexion and the skin lustre, mental endeavour and diligence.
- 'All pervading lung' (khyab-byed rlung) is located is in the heart. This lung regulates lifting, walking, stretching and the contraction of muscles: opening and closing of the mouth, eyelids, anus etc.
- 'Fire accompanying lung' (me-mnyam rlung) is located is in the stomach and abdomen area. This lung regulates digestion and the metabolism. This lung also ripens the Seven Bodily Sustainers (Tibetan: lus-zung dhun).
- 'Downward cleansing lung' (thur-sel rlung) is located in the rectum, gastrointestinal tract and perineal region and its function is to expel feces, urine, semen, menstruation, uterine contractions and the fetus. This is also considered as "enjoyment lung" by most of the sublime practices of Vajrayana. (direct transmission is to be required by a qualified teacher)

== Subtle body ==
Tibetan Buddhism views the human body as consisting of a coarse body made of six constituent elements of earth, water, fire, wind, space and consciousness and also of a subtle body, or 'Vajra body', of winds, channels and drops. There are many types of wind or 'subtle breath' that move along the invisible channels of the subtle body. The 'vital breath' (Tibetan:sog lung) is considered the most important. It is "the essence of life itself that animates and sustains all living beings". Anuttarayoga Tantra practices from the Mahamudra meditation system, such as Guhyasamāja, Cakrasaṃvara and Hevajra tantras, provide various methods to penetrate the vital points of the Subtle Body. The 14th Dalai Lama summarises the practice: "To penetrate these points means to gather there the energy-winds and the subtle minds that ride on them, basically by means of different types of absorbed concentration focused on these spots.". Practices that work with the subtle energy winds includes tummo or 'Inner Fire', one of the Six Yogas of Naropa. In this practice, the yogin or yogini uses breathing and meditation techniques to draw the lung or subtle winds into the central channel and hold them there, traversing the body vertically.

== Tsalung ==
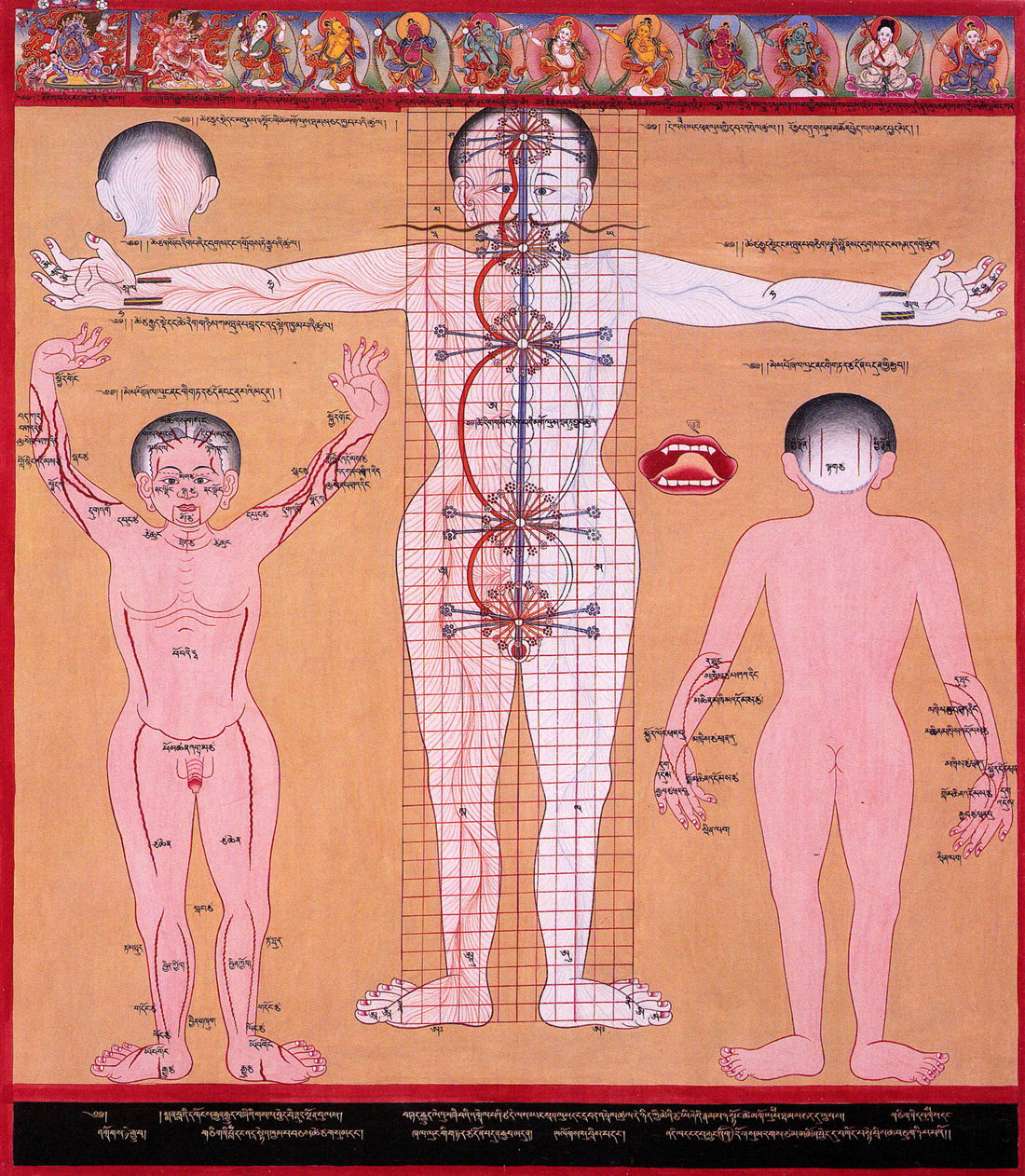
A Tibetan illustration of the subtle body showing the central channel and two side channels as well as five chakras.

Tsalung (Skt: nadi-vayu; Tib. rtsa rlung; where "rtsa" denotes an energetic channel) are special yogic exercises. The exercises are used in the Bon tradition and the four main schools of Tibetan Buddhism. Trul khor employs the tsa lung and they constitute the internal yantra or sacred architecture of this yoga's Sanskrit name, yantra yoga. Tsa lung are also employed in generation stage practices.

== See also ==
- Māna
- Prana
- Qi
- Tummo
