= Wind Horse =

Symbol of the human soul in East Asian and Central Asian traditions

Windhorse by C.J.Fynn

The wind horse is a flying horse that is the symbol of the human soul in the shamanistic tradition of East Asia and Central Asia. In Tibetan Buddhism, it was included as the pivotal element in the center of the four animals symbolizing the cardinal directions and a symbol of the idea of well-being or good fortune. It has also given the name to a type of prayer flag that has the five animals printed on it.

Depending on the language, the symbol has slightly different names.

- Tibetan: རླུང་རྟ་, Wylie: rlung rta, pronounced lungta, Tibetan for "wind horse"
- Mongolian: хийморь, khiimori, literally "gas horse," semantically "wind horse," colloquial meaning soul.

== In Tibetan usage ==
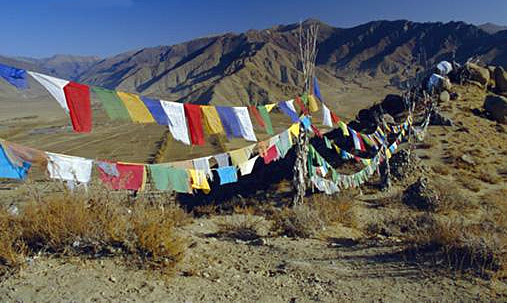
Lungta-style prayer flags hang along a mountain path in Nepal

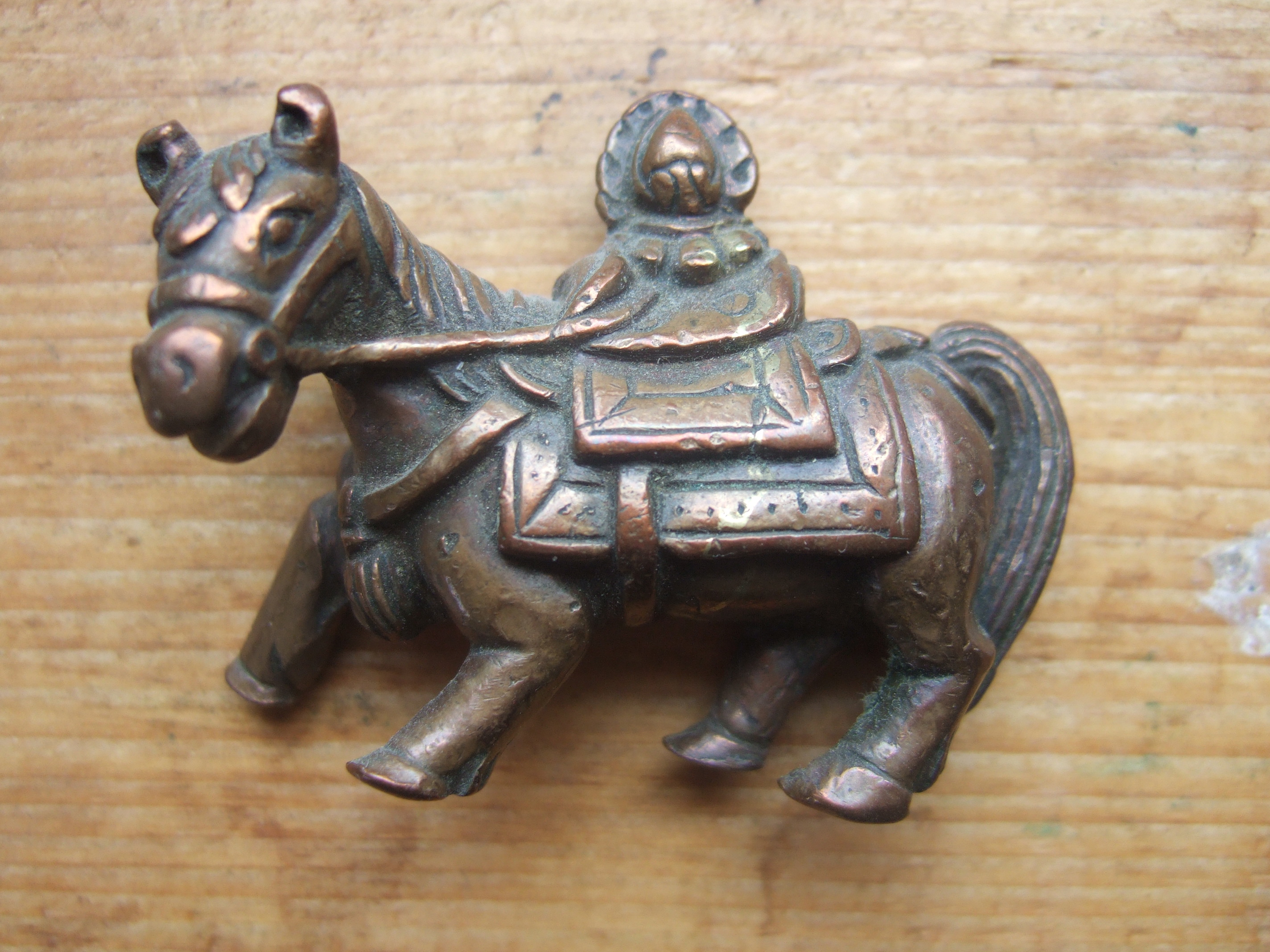
Tibetan bronze statue of a windhorse, probably 19th century

In Tibet, a distinction was made between Buddhism (Wylie: lha chos, literally "divine dharma") and folk religion (Wylie: mi chos, "human dharma"). Windhorse was predominantly a feature of the folk culture, a "mundane notion of the layman rather than a Buddhist religious ideal," as Tibetan scholar Samten G. Karmay explains.

However, while "the original concept of rlung ta bears no relation to Buddhism," over the centuries it became more common for Buddhist elements to be incorporated. In particular, in the nineteenth century lamas of the Rimé movement, particularly the great scholar Ju Mipham, began to "create a systematic interweaving of native shamanism, oral epic, and Buddhist tantra, alchemical Taoism, Dzogchen, and the strange, vast Kalachakra tantra," and windhorse was increasingly given Buddhist undertones and used in Buddhist contexts.

Windhorse has several meanings in the Tibetan context. As Karmay notes, "the word [windhorse] is still and often mistakenly taken to mean only the actual flag planted on the roof of a house or on a high place near a village. In fact, it is a symbol of the idea of well-being or good fortune. This idea is clear in such expressions as rlung rta dar ba, the 'increase of the windhorse,' when things go well with someone; rlung rta rgud pa, the 'decline of windhorse,' when the opposite happens. The colloquial equivalent for this is lam ’gro, which also means luck."

=== Origination ===
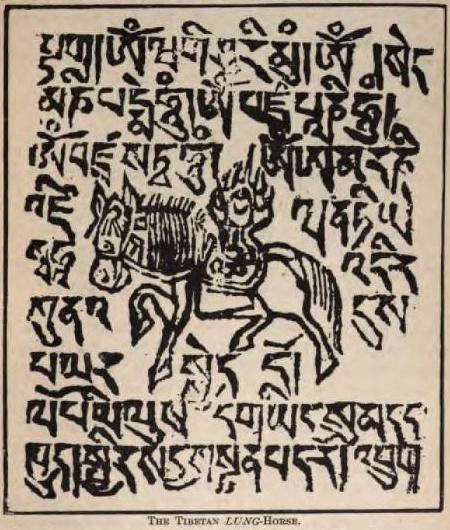
A Tibetan "lungta" or "wind horse" prayer flag from the 1895 book by Laurence Austine Waddell

In his 1998 study The Arrow and the Spindle, Karmay traces several antecedents for the wind horse tradition in Tibet. First, he notes that there has long been confusion over the spelling because the sound produced by the word can be spelt either klung rta "river horse" or rlung rta "wind horse". In the early twentieth century the great scholar Jamgon Ju Mipham Gyatso felt compelled to clarify that in his view rlung rta was preferable to klung rta, indicating that some degree of ambiguity must have persisted at least up to his time.

Karmay suggests that "river horse" (klung rta) was actually the original concept, as found in the Tibetan nag rtsis system of astrology imported from China. The nag rtsis system has four basic elements: srog (vital force), lu (wylie: lus, body), wangtang (wylie: dbang thang, "field of power"), and lungta (wylie: klung rta, river horse). Karmey suggests that klung rta in turn derives from the Chinese idea of the lung ma, "dragon horse," because in Chinese mythology dragons often arise out of rivers (although druk [wylie: 'brug] is the Tibetan for dragon, in some cases they would render the Chinese lung phonetically). Thus, in his proposed etymology the Chinese lung ma became klung rta which in turn became rlung rta. Samtay further reasons that the drift in understanding from "river horse" to "wind horse" would have been reinforced by associations in Tibet of the "ideal horse" (rta chogs) with swiftness and wind.

=== Symbolism and the lhasang ritual ===
On prayer flags and paper prints, windhorses usually appear in the company of the four animals of the cardinal directions, which are "an integral part of the rlung ta composition": garuda or kyung, and dragon in the upper corners, and White Tiger and Snow Lion in the lower corners. In this context, the wind horse is typically shown without wings, but carries the Three Jewels, or the wish fulfilling jewel. Its appearance is supposed to bring peace, wealth, and harmony. The ritual invocation of the wind horse usually happens in the morning and during the growing moon. The flags themselves are commonly known as windhorse. They flutter in the wind, and carry the prayers to heaven like the horse flying in the wind.

The garuda and the dragon have their origin in Indian (both Buddhist and Hindu) and Chinese mythology, respectively. However, regarding the origin of the animals as a tetrad, "neither written nor oral explanations exist anywhere" with the exception of a thirteenth-century manuscript called "The Appearance of the Little Black-Headed Man" (dBu nag mi'u dra chag), and in that case a yak is substituted for the snow lion, which had not yet emerged as the national symbol of Tibet. In the text, a nyen (wylie: gNyan, mountain spirit) kills his son-in-law, Khri-to, who is the primeval human man, in a misguided attempt to avenge his daughter. The nyen then is made to see his mistake by a mediator and compensates Khri-to's six sons with the gift of the tiger, yak, Garuda, dragon, goat, and dog. The first four brothers then launch an exhibition to kill robbers who were also involved with their mother's death, and each of their four animals then becomes a personal drala (wylie: dgra bla, "protective warrior spirit") to one of the four brothers. The brothers who received the goat and dog choose not to participate, and their animals therefore do not become drala. Each of the brothers represents one of the six primitive Tibetan clans (bod mi'u gdung drug), with which their respective animals also become associated.

The four animals (with the snow lion replacing the yak) also recur frequently in the Epic of King Gesar and sometimes Gesar and his horse are depicted with the dignities in place of the windhorse. In this context the snow lion, garuda and dragon represent the Ling (wylie: Gling) community from which Gesar comes, while the tiger represents the family of the Tagrong (wylie: sTag rong), Gesar's paternal uncle.

The wind horse ceremonies are usually conducted in conjunction with the lhasang (Wylie: lha bsang "smoke offering to the gods") ritual, in which juniper branches are burned to create thick and fragrant smoke. This is believed to increase the strength in the supplicant of the four nag rtsis elements mentioned above. Often the ritual is called the risang lungta (Wylie: ri bsang rlung ta), the "fumigation offering and (the throwing into the wind or planting) of the rlung ta high in the mountains." The ritual is traditionally "primarily a secular ritual" and "requires no presence of any special officiant whether public or private." The layperson entreats a mountain deity to "increase his fortune like the galloping of a horse and expand his prosperity like the boiling over of milk (Wylie: rlung ta ta rgyug/ kha rje 'o ma 'phyur 'phyur).

=== Chögyam Trungpa ===
The late 20th-century Tibetan Buddhist master Chögyam Trungpa incorporated variants of many of the elements above, particularly the windhorse, drala, the four animals (which he called "dignities"), wangtang, lha, nyen and lu, into a secular system of teachings he called Shambhala Training. It is through Shambhala Training that many of the ideas above have become familiar to westerners.

== Heraldry ==
Wind Horse from the coat of arms of Mongolia

The wind horse is a rare element in heraldry. It is shown as a strongly stylized flying horse with wings. The most common example is the emblem of Mongolia.

== See also ==
- Lung
- Tulpar
- Pegasus
- Horse symbolism
