= Yantra cloth =

Fabric amulets with Buddhist texts from South-East Asia

Yantra cloth or pha yant (ผ้ายันต์) are red, black, or white fabrics decorated with Buddhist esoteric inscriptions known as yantra that are used in South-East Asia to seek spiritual protection for houses or individuals, dead or alive. While they are very common, they are unorthodox Buddhist superstitions as described by psychologist Stuart Vyse.

== Description ==
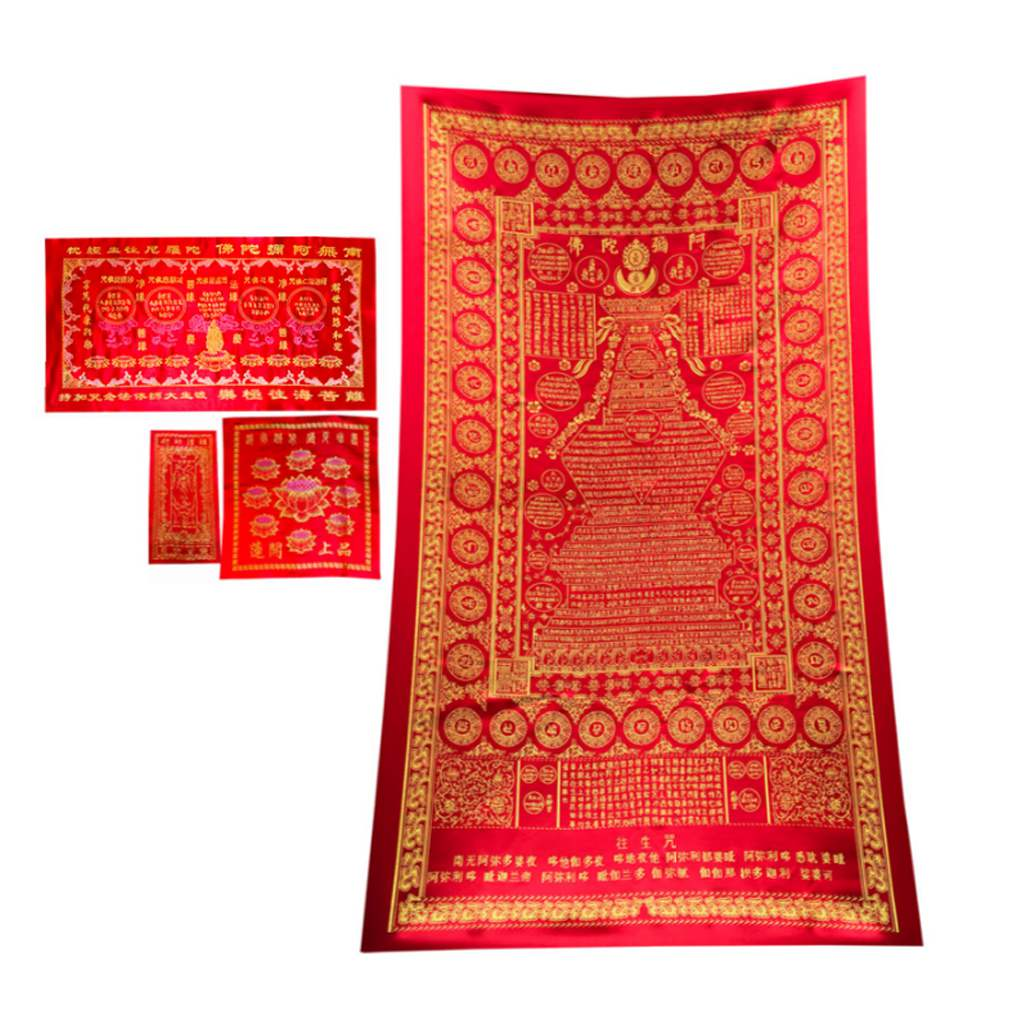
Dharani Sutra Quilt are used to cover dead bodies in China.

=== Forms ===
The yantra cloth can be used to protect houses. In Chinese culture, it is used to cover dead bodies. In Cambodia and Thailand, yantra cloth is used to make shirts to boost Bokator fighters. The latter have also become popular for international fighters such as Thiago Silva.

=== Dedication ===
Some yantra cloth remain sibylline in their interpretation. Most Khmer yantra cloth used to protect houses are decorated with rain quails. In Thailand, it is common to see yantra cloth dedicated to Buddhist divinities such as Nang Kwak or Thao Kuwen or dead monks such as Luang Phor Koon.

== Rituals ==
=== Fabrication ===
During a traditional fabrication of yantra cloth, special rituals and khatha writings are made with incantations and black magic in order to ensure to superstitious efficiency of the artefact. Modern marketing may sell factory-processed yantra cloth without going through these rites.

=== Home blessings ===
Raising a yantra cloth on the beams of a new house is an essential rite in the blessing of a new house in Thailand and Cambodia in order to ward off evils spirits.

== See also ==
- Cetiya
- Sacca-kiriyā
- Paritta
- Prayer flag – Tibetan religious item
- Jinapañjara
- Somdej Toh
- Luang pho phet
- Kuman thong
- Yantra tattooing

== Bibliography ==
- Gonzalez-Wippler, Migene (2001). Complete Book Of Amulets & Talismans. Lewellyn Publications. ISBN 0-87542-287-X.
