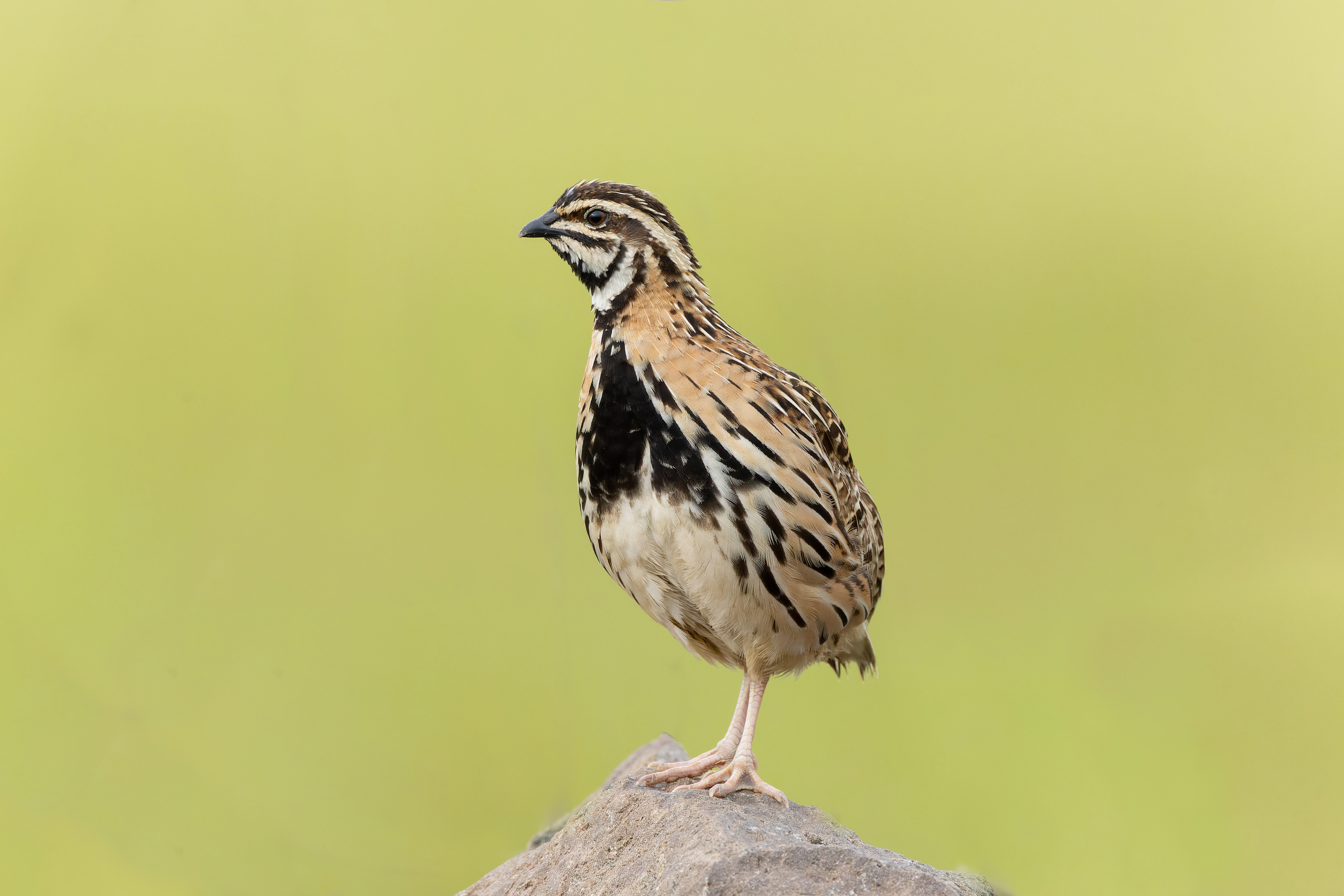
- Male in Bhigwan, Maharashtra, India.
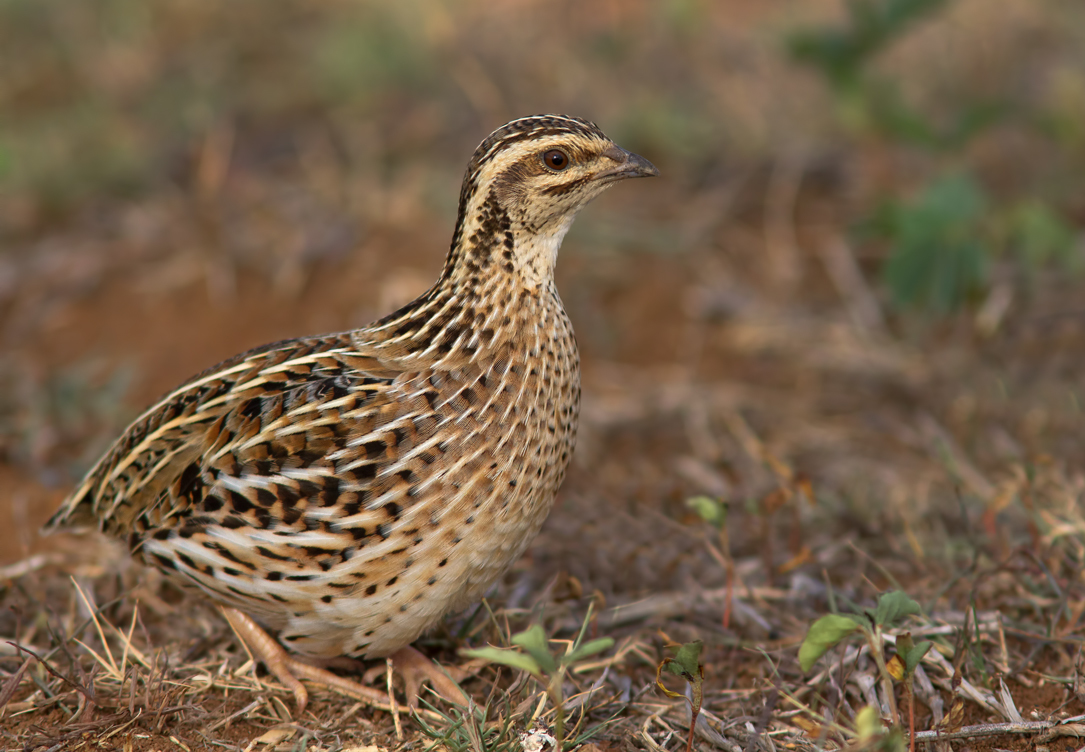
- Female Call

Conservation status
- Least Concern (IUCN 3.1)

Scientific classification
- Kingdom: Animalia
- Phylum: Chordata
- Class: Aves
- Order: Galliformes
- Family: Phasianidae
- Genus: Coturnix
- Species: C. coromandelica

Binomial name
- Coturnix coromandelica (Gmelin, JF, 1789)

= Rain quail =

Species of bird

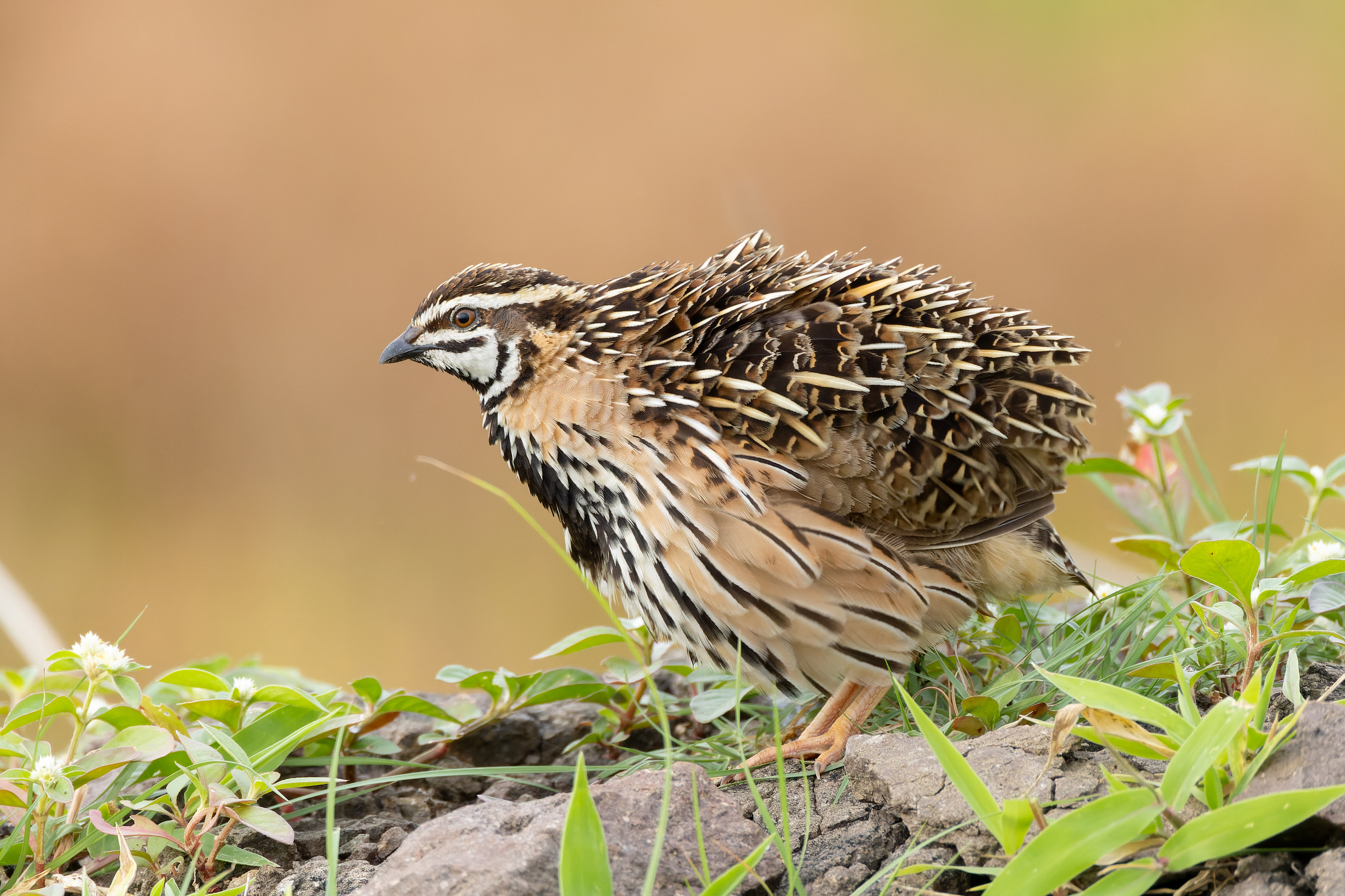
In Bhigwan, Maharashtra, India.

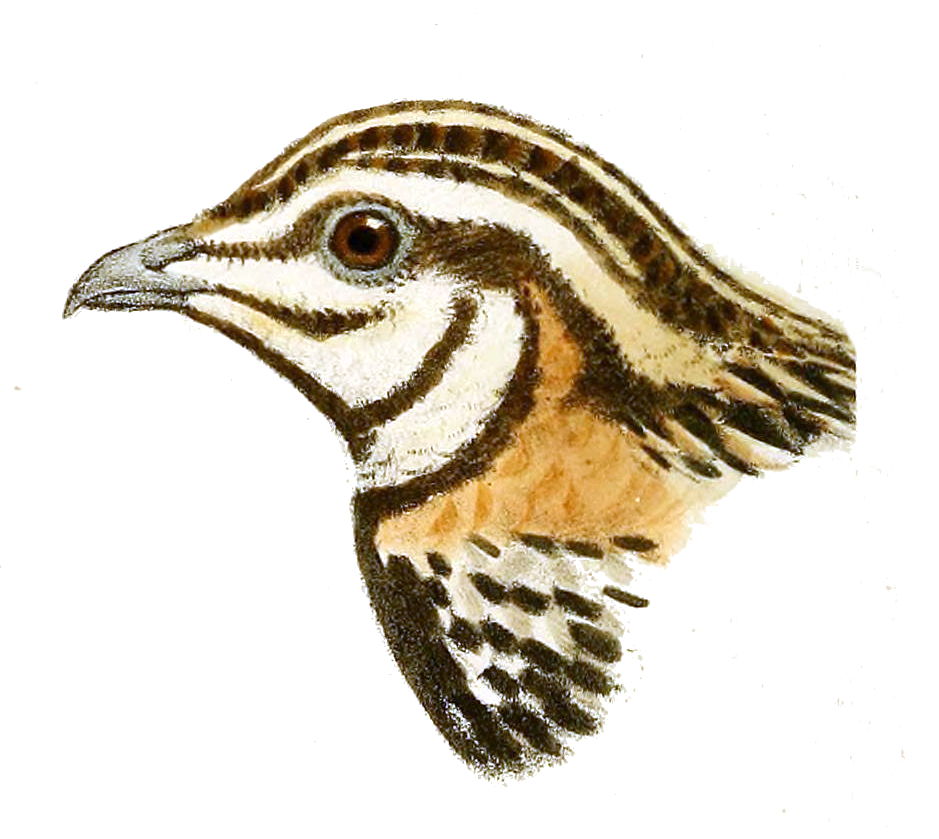
Drawing of the head of a rain quail

The rain quail or black-breasted quail (Coturnix coromandelica) is a species of quail found in the Indian Sub-continent and South-east Asia; its range including Pakistan, India, Nepal, Sri Lanka, Bangladesh, Myanmar, Thailand, Cambodia and Vietnam.

== Taxonomy ==
The rain quail was formally described in 1789 by the German naturalist Johann Friedrich Gmelin in his revised and expanded edition of Carl Linnaeus's Systema Naturae. He placed it with all the quail like birds in the genus Tetrao and coined the binomial name Tetrao coromandelicus. Gmelin based his description on "La Petite caille de Gingi" that had been described in 1782 by the French naturalist Pierre Sonnerat in his Voyage aux Indes orientales et a la Chine. The rain quail is now one of six species placed in the genus Coturnix that was introduced in 1764 by the French naturalist François Alexandre Pierre de Garsault. The genus name is the Latin for the common quail. The specific epithet coromandelica is from the type location, the Coromandel Coast of southeast India. The species is monotypic: no subspecies are recognised.

== Description ==
The rain quail lacks barring on primaries. The male has a black breast-patch and distinctive head pattern of black and white. The female is difficult to separate from female common quail and Japanese quail, although the spots on the breast are more delicate. It is 6–6.5 in (15–17 cm) and weighs roughly 2.25–2.5 oz (64–71 g).

The call is a metallic pair of quit- quit nots, constantly repeated mornings and evenings, and in the breeding season also during the night. It is quite unmistakably distinct from the call of the common grey quail.

== Distribution ==
Grassland, cropped fields, and scrub in the Indus valley of central Bangladesh, India, Nepal and Pakistan, ranging across the Gangetic plains, and parts of peninsular continental India. Mostly seen in winter further south.

== Behaviour ==
The rain quail feeds on seeds of grasses and other plants, insect larvae and small invertebrates. Breeding takes place between March and October, but chiefly after the start of the southwesterly monsoon season in June. The eggs are laid in a scrape in the ground, sometimes in the open under a Euphorbia or similar bush. There are usually six to eight eggs in the clutch. The incubation period is sixteen to eighteen days. The chicks are able to leave the nest soon after they have hatched and remain with their parents for about eight months.

== Status ==
The rain quail has a very large range and the population is stable. It is a common species and the International Union for Conservation of Nature has rated their conservation status as "least concern".

== Culture ==
In Khmer culture, the rain quail is a symbolic figure often represented at the center of some yantra cloth, as an auspicious sign for the protection of a home.
