= Prayer flag =

Tibetan religious item

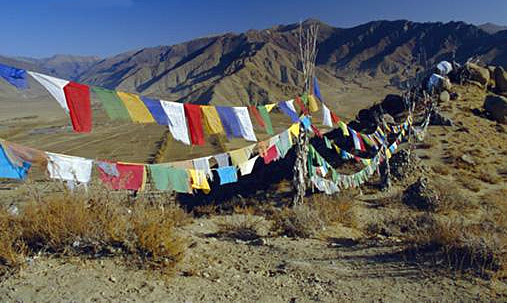
Lung ta prayer flags hang along a mountain path in Nepal.

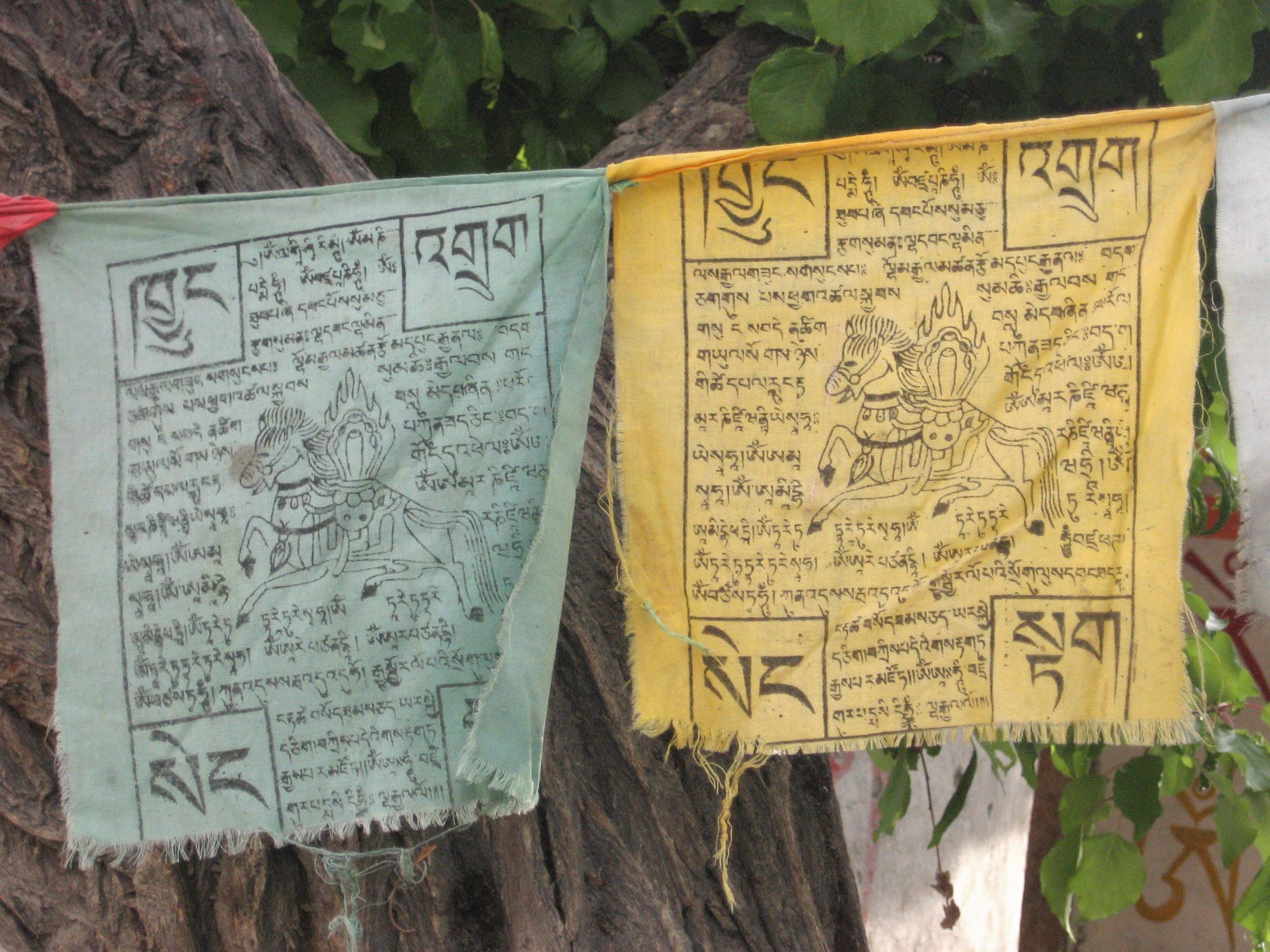
Close-up of a Lung ta ("Wind Horse") prayer flag, Ladakh, India

A Tibetan prayer flag is a colorful rectangular cloth, often found strung along trails and peaks high in the Himalayas. They are used to bless the surrounding countryside and for other purposes.

Prayer flags are believed to have originated within the religious tradition of Bon. In Bon, shamanistic Bonpo used primary-colored plain flags in Tibet. Traditional prayer flags include woodblock-printed text and images.

== History ==
Nepal Sutras, originally written on cloth banners, were transmitted to other regions of the world as prayer flags. Legend ascribes the origin of the prayer flag to the Gautama Buddha, whose prayers were written on battle flags used by the devas against their adversaries, the asuras. The legend may have given the Indian Bhikṣu a reason for carrying the heavenly banner as a way of signifying his commitment to ahimsa. This knowledge was carried into Tibet by 800 CE, and the actual flags were introduced no later than 1040 CE, where they were further modified. The Indian monk Atisha (980–1054 CE) introduced the Indian practice of printing on cloth prayer flags to Tibet and Nepal.

During the Cultural Revolution, prayer flags were discouraged but not entirely eliminated. Many traditional designs may have been lost. Currently, different styles of prayer flags can be seen all across the Tibetan region.

== Lung ta/Darchog styles ==
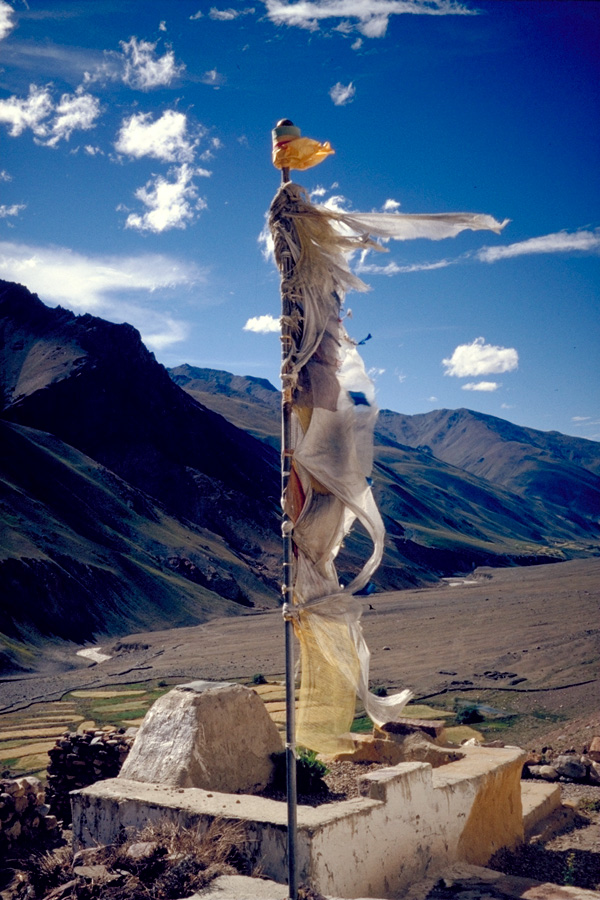
A Darchog prayer flag in northern India

There are two kinds of prayer flags: horizontal ones, called Lung ta (Wylie: rlung-rta, meaning "Wind Horse" in Tibetan), and vertical ones, called Darchog (Wylie: dar-lcog, meaning "flagstaff").

Lung ta (horizontal) prayer flags are of square or rectangular shape, and are connected along their top edges to a long string or thread. They are commonly hung on a diagonal line from high to low between two objects (e.g., a rock and the top of a pole) in high places such as the tops of temples, monasteries, stupas, and mountain passes.

Darchog (vertical) prayer flags are usually large single rectangles attached to poles along their vertical edge. Darchog are commonly planted in the ground, mountains, cairns, and on rooftops, and are iconographically and symbolically related to the Dhvaja.

== Color and order ==
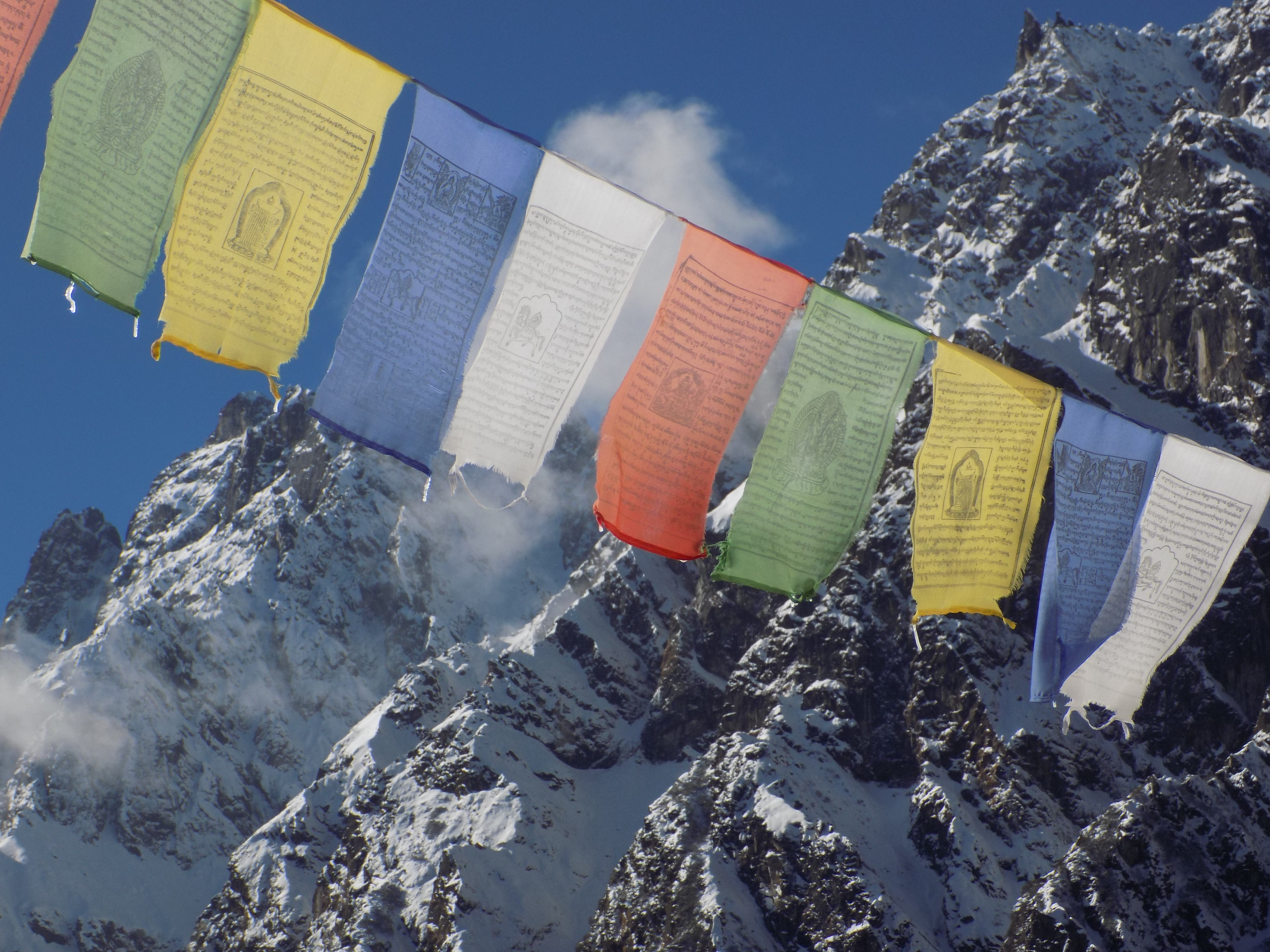
Five colors of prayer flag on a mountain in Sikkim

Traditionally, prayer flags come in sets of five. The five colors represent the five elements and the Five Pure Lights. Different elements are associated with different colors for specific traditions, purposes and sadhana. Blue symbolizes the sky and space, white symbolizes the air and wind, red symbolizes fire, green symbolizes water, and yellow symbolizes earth. According to Traditional Tibetan medicine, health and harmony are produced through the balance of the five elements.

== Symbols and prayers ==
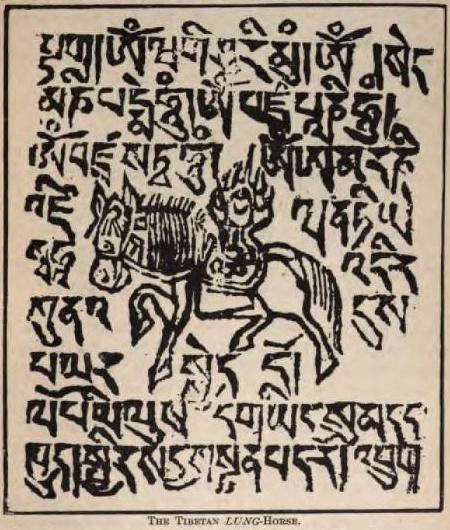
A Tibetan "lung ta" or "wind horse" from an 1895 book by Laurence Austine Waddell

The center of a prayer flag traditionally features a lung ta (powerful or strong horse) bearing three flaming jewels (specifically ratna) on its back. The ta is a symbol of speed and the transformation of bad fortune to good fortune. The three flaming jewels symbolize the Buddha, the Dharma (Buddhist teachings) and the Sangha (Buddhist community)—the three cornerstones of Tibetan philosophical tradition.

Surrounding the lung ta are various versions of approximately 400 traditional mantras, each dedicated to a particular deity. These writings include mantras from three of the great Buddhist Bodhisattvas: Padmasambhava (Guru Rinpoche), Avalokiteśvara (Chenrezig, the bodhisattva of compassion and the patron of the Tibetan people) and Manjusri.

In addition to mantras, prayers for a long life of good fortune are often included for the person who mounts the flags.

Images or the names of four powerful animals, also known as the Four Dignities, adorn each corner of a flag: the dragon, the garuda, the tiger, and the snow lion. The prayer tag Om mani padme hum is based on four symbolic terms: om (which symbolizes one's impure body, speech, and mind), mani (which means jewel and symbolizes the factors of method—the altruistic intention to become enlightened, compassion and love, padme (which means lotus and symbolizes wisdom), and hum (the seed syllable of Akshobhya—the immovable and the unfluctuating that which cannot be disturbed by anything).

Wishes are also written on them.

== Symbolism and tradition ==
Traditionally, prayer flags are used to promote peace, compassion, strength, and wisdom. The flags do not carry prayers to gods, which is a common misconception; rather, the Tibetans believe the prayers and mantras will be blown by the wind to spread the good will and compassion into all pervading space. Therefore, prayer flags are thought to bring benefit to all.

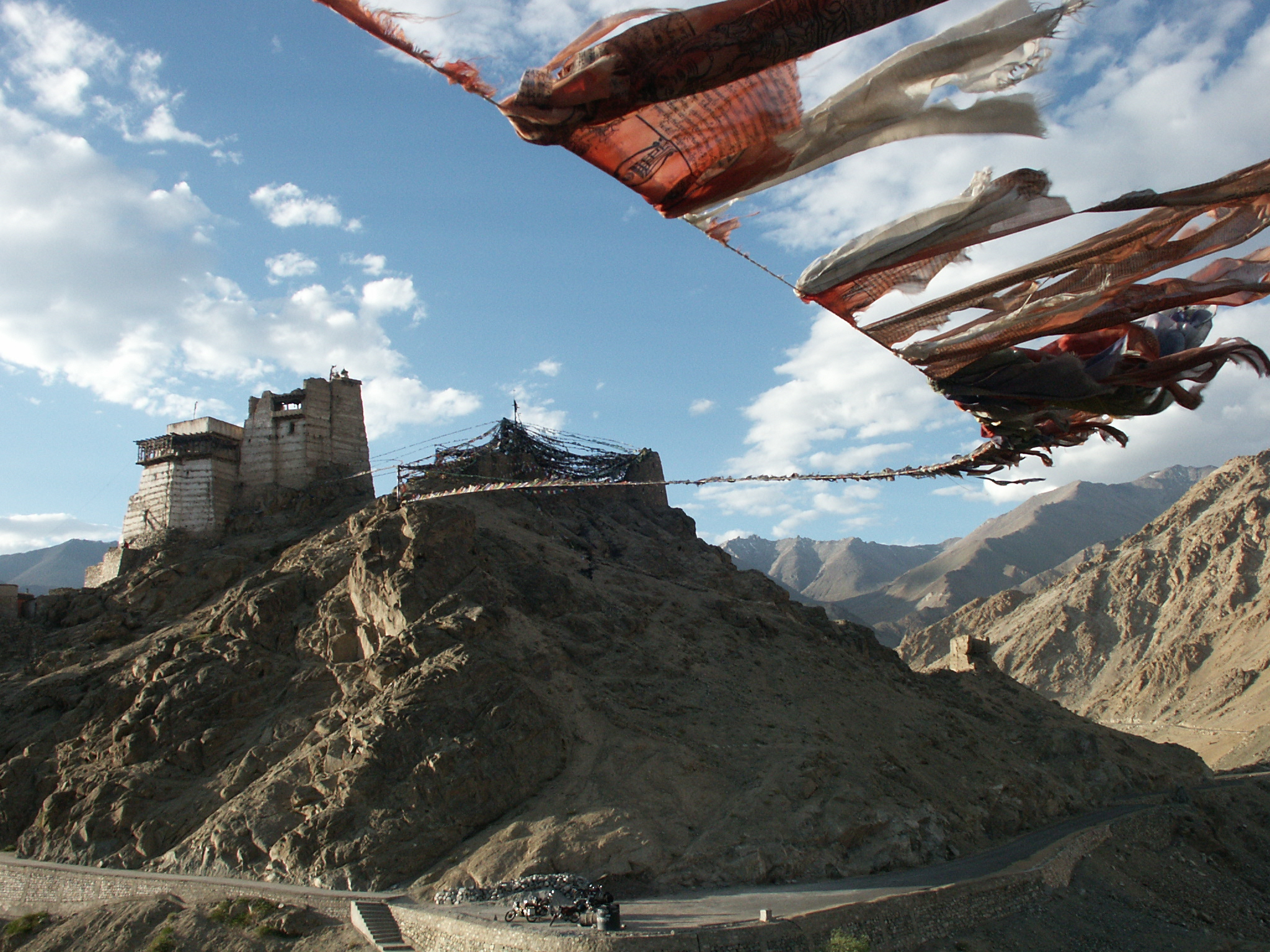
Faded prayer flags in the wind between the two peaks of the Peak of Victory over Leh, Ladakh, India. The Namgyal Tsemo Gompa can be seen on the peak.

By hanging flags in high places the Lung ta will carry the blessings depicted on the flags to all beings. As wind passes over the surface of the flags, which are sensitive to the slightest movement of the wind, the air is purified and sanctified by the mantras.

The prayers of a flag become a permanent part of the universe as the images fade from exposure to the elements. Just as life moves on and is replaced by new life, Tibetans renew their hopes for the world by continually mounting new flags alongside the old. This act symbolizes a welcoming of life's changes and an acknowledgment that all beings are part of a greater ongoing cycle.

According to traditional belief, because the symbols and mantras on prayer flags are sacred, they should be treated with respect. They should not be placed on the ground or used on clothing. Old prayer flags should be burned.

== Timing of hanging and taking down ==
Some believe that if the flags are hung on inauspicious astrological dates, they may bring negative results for as long as they are flying. The best time to put up new prayer flags is in the morning on sunny, windy days.

In Tibet, old prayer flags are replaced with new ones annually on the Tibetan New Year.

== See also ==
- Buddhist prayer beads
- Bunting (textile)
- Namkha
- Papel picado
- Phurba
- Stupa
- Tibetan prayer wheel
- Yantra cloth – Fabric amulets with Buddhist texts from South-East Asia
