= Gatha (Buddhism) =

Sacred Pali verses, prayers, mantras and other spiritual incantations

In Buddhism, gāthā (Pali from Sanskrit gāthā; Khmer: គាថា; Thai: คาถา; also spelled khatha) refers to any Prakrit and Pali verses in general, or specifically the arya meter of Sanskrit. Versified portions of Pāli Canon (Tipitaka) of Theravāda Buddhism are also specifically called gathas. The word is originally derived from the Sanskrit/Prakrit root gai, which means 'to speak, sing, recite or extol', cognate to the Avestan term gatha.

The stanzas of the Prakrit dialects of Ardhamagadhi, Sauraseni and Pāli are known as gathas as opposed to shlokas and sutras of Sanskrit and dohas of Apabhramsha. Most of the Jain and Buddhist texts written in Prakrit are composed of gathas (or verses/stanzas).

== List of gathas ==
Versified portions of Pāli Canon (Tipitaka) of Theravāda Buddhism are specifically called gathas. In addition, some texts titled with 'gāthā' are found in traditional Pāli parittas. Here are the gathas as cited in the chanting book of the Dhammayut Order:

- Ovāda-pāṭimokkha Gāthā
- Sabba-patti-dāna Gāthā (Verses for Dedication of Merit)
- Devatādipattidāna Gāthā (Dedication of Merit to the Devas & Others)
- Uddissanādhiṭṭhāna Gāthā (Verses for Dedicating Merit)
- Aṭṭh’aṅgika-magga Gāthā (Verses on the Eightfold Path)
- Dhamma-gārav’ādi Gāthā (Verses on Respect for the Dhamma, etc.)
- Bhāra-sutta Gāthā (Verses from the Discourses on the Burden)
- Namakāra-siddhi Gāthā (Verses on Success through Homage)
- Cha Ratana Paritta Gāthā (The Six Protective Verses from the Discourse on Treasures)
- Buddha-jaya-maṅgala Gāthā (The Verses of the Buddha’s Victory Blessings)
- Devatāyuyyojana Gāthā (Verses Ushering the Devas Back Home)
- Tāyana-gāthā (The Verse to Tāyana)
- Vihāra-dāna Gāthā (Verses on Giving a Dwelling)
- Nidhi-kaṇḍa-sutta Gāthā (Verses from the Discourse on the Reserve Fund)
- Tiro-kuḍḍa-kaṇḍa-sutta Gāthā (Hungry Shades Outside the Walls)
- Jinapañjara Gāthā

There are also some esoteric gāthās of other traditions such as:

- Dhammakāyānussati Gāthā
- Randeṇe Gāthā

== Traditional practices ==
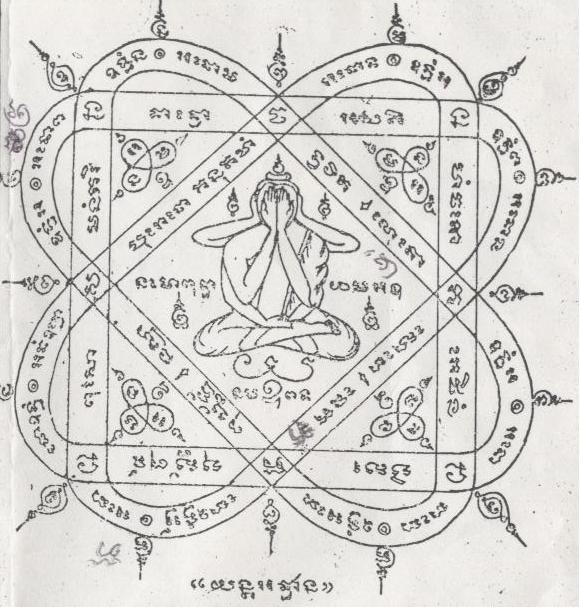
A sacred yantra (tattoo) used in Thailand as amulets and shamanistic sak yant, written in Old Khmer script

In traditional Khmer and Thai practice, khatha (gāthā), referring the Sacred Pali prayers, mantras and other magical incantations, is used in general by Thai people for a great many purposes; be it for protection, charm or business ventures, there is a khatha which can be summoned. The word khatha, or "gāthā" in Pali, means "speech", and thus the original meaning of the word implies that khatha were used only as spoken language, and not written form. In spite of this fact, the word khatha is used to refer to both that which is spoken, and also written.

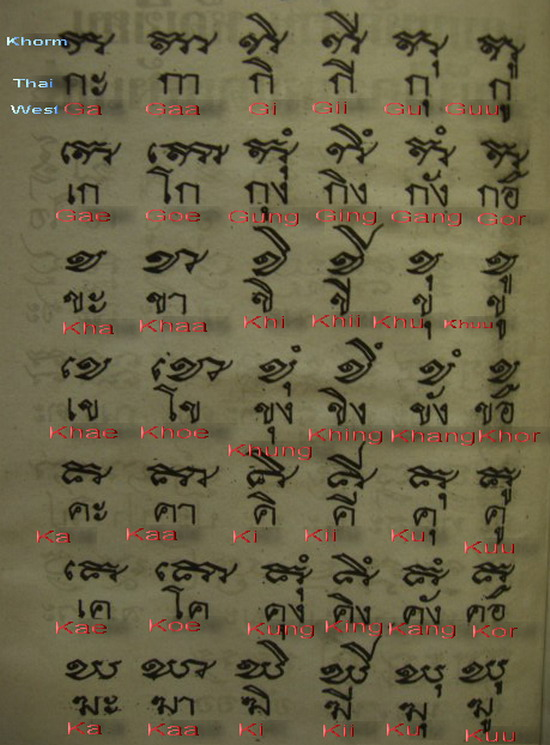
The Khom script, the lettering seen used in Sak Yant tattoos

Khatha is also used in Buddhist chanting by Thai Ruesi (hermit sage) practitioner for their magical spells, inscribed on Thai Buddha amulets and yantra cloths, as well as being the main body of content in Sak Yant tattooing. The sacred yantra tattoo designs are both filled with Pali Gāthā, as well as being used to embellish the spaces between each of the designs too. When a khatha is inscribed on paper, cloth, metal, skin, or any other surface for that matter, it is traditionally done using the Ancient Khmer script (known as "Khom" in Thailand). The ancient Khmer script is only permitted to be used for sacred or scriptural texts, and never for common speech or everyday matters. This alphabet is considered by some Thai people to be extremely sacred and to possess spiritual power within the letters.

== Contemporary practices ==
In contemporary Buddhist practice as popularized (and derived from the Zen and Theravādin traditions) by Zen Master Thich Nhat Hanh, a gatha is a verse recited, usually mentally, in rhythm with the breath as part of mindfulness practice, either in daily life, or as part of meditation or meditative study.

== Related links ==
- Kun Khmer Warrior
- Buddha Magic Ezine - The Importance of Chanting Pra Katha
