= Pchum Ben =

15-day religious festival in Cambodia

- Also called: Ancestor's Day
- Observed by: Khmer people
- Type: Religious
- Date: Last day (15th of waning day or new moon) of the 10th Khmer month
- Related to: Boun Khao Padap Din (in Laos); Mataka dānēs (in Sri Lanka); Sat Thai (in Thailand); Ghost Festival (in China); Tết Trung Nguyên (in Vietnam); Obon (in Japan); Baekjung (in Korea)

Pchum Ben (Khmer: ភ្ជុំបិណ្ឌ, Phchŭm Bĕnd [pʰcum bən], lit. 'balled rice gathering'), or Sen Don Ta (Khmer: សែនដូនតា, Sên Don Ta [saen ɗoːn taː], lit. 'offerings for ancestors') in the Khmer Surin and Khmer Krom communities, is a Cambodian 15-day religious festival, culminating in celebrations on the 15th day of the tenth month in the Khmer calendar, at the end of the Buddhist Lent, Vassa.

The day is a time when many Cambodians pay their respects to deceased relatives of up to seven generations. Buddhist monks chant the suttas in Pali language overnight (continuously, without sleeping - potentially but citation is needed for modern Cambodia in this instance) in prelude to the gates of hell opening, an event that is presumed to occur once a year, and is linked to the cosmology of King Yama. During this period, the gates of hell are opened and spirits of the ancestors are presumed to be especially active. In order to liberate them, food-offerings are made to benefit them, some of them having the opportunity to end their period of purgation, whereas others are imagined to leave hell temporarily, to then return to endure more suffering; without much explanation, relatives who are not in hell (who are in heaven or other realms of existence) are also generally expected to benefit from the ceremonies.

In temples adhering to canonical protocol, the offering of food itself is made from the laypeople to the (living) Buddhist monks, thus generating "merit" that indirectly benefits the dead. However, in many temples, this is either accompanied by or superseded by food offerings that are imagined to directly transfer from the living to the dead, such as rice-balls thrown through the air, or rice thrown into an empty field. Anthropologist Satoru Kobayashi observed that these two models of merit-offering to the dead are in competition in rural Cambodia, with some temples preferring the greater canonicity of the former model, and others embracing the popular (if unorthodox) assumption that mortals can "feed" ghosts with physical food.

Pchum Bun is considered unique to Cambodia. However, there are merit-transference ceremonies that can be closely compared to it in Sri Lanka, such as offering food to the ghosts of the dead. In its broad outlines, it also resembles the Taiwanese Ghost Festival in its links to the notion of a calendrical opening of the gates of hell, King Yama, and so on.

== See also ==
- Public holidays in Cambodia
- Kathina
- Transfer of merit
- Smot (chanting)
- Achar (Buddhism)
- Ullambana
