= Khanom la =

Thai dessert

Khanom la (Thai: ขนมลา, pronounced [kʰa.nǒm lāː]) is a traditional snack of Nakhon Si Thammarat Province in southern Thailand. It is made from rice flour deep fried in thin strands with egg yolk to a golden appearance, then gathered and shaped to various designs. Khanom la is one of five snacks and desserts used as traditional offerings to monks in the Sat Thai festival, which falls in September or October, an important traditional observance for the people of southern Thailand especially in Nakhon Si Thammarat Province. Khanom la represents offerings of clothes to the spirits of the dead.

Khanom la can be separated in two types: la chet and la krop. Khanom la chet is thick and has less oil. When it is cooked, it will be formed in to a semicircle. Meanwhile, khanom la krop is a crispy one. It is done by adding more sugar on top of the normal khanom la chet and drying it in the sun. Another way to cook khanom la is to add more flour, and more oil. When it is done, it will be rolled with a stick then let dry and pulled out.

Nowadays, khanom la is made and sold all year round and not limited to the festival period.

== History ==
In the past, khanom la was made using coconut shells. People would drill several small holes in the coconut shell, through which the flour mixture was poured. The name khanom la may have come from the Thai term for coconut shells, kala (กะลา). Now, they drill small holes into cans instead of coconut shells.

== Beliefs ==
From Nakhom Si Thammarat and Surat Thani period, Villagers in Pak Phanang knew how to make khanom la used for Tenth Lunar Month Festival (Sat Thai) of Nakhom Si Thammarat period. In the past, They believed the deceased ancestors to be dire in the grave will return to earth. To get a charitable donation given by grandchildren. Which are Khanom la same as clothes, food and facilities that necessary to use.

== See also ==
- Thai cuisine
- List of Thai desserts
