= Obon =

Japanese Buddhist custom

Obon Festival
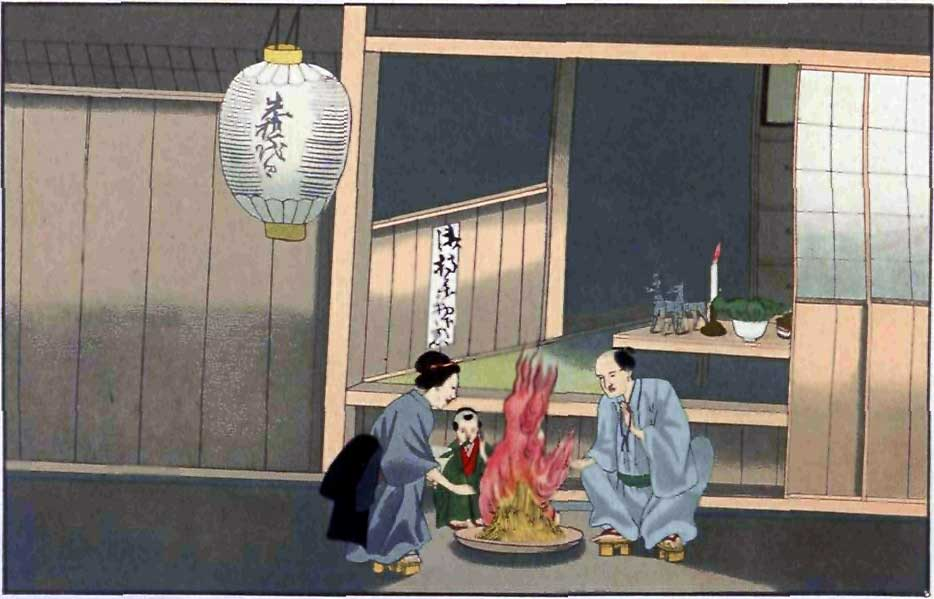
- A depiction of Obon in the late Edo period
- Also called: Bon
- Observed by: Japanese people
- Type: Religious, Cultural
- Significance: Honors the spirits of one's ancestors
- Date: August 15; July 15 (Kantō); 15th day of the 7th lunar month
- 2025 date: 6 September
- 2026 date: 27 August
- 2027 date: 16 August
- 2028 date: 3 September
- Duration: 4 days
- Frequency: Annual
- Related to: Ghost Festival (in China); Tết Trung Nguyên (in Vietnam); Baekjung (in Korea); Bun/Usōrō (in Ryukyu Islands); Pchum Ben (in Cambodia); Boun Khao Padap Din (in Laos); Mataka dānēs (in Sri Lanka); Sat Thai (in Thailand)

Obon (お盆; [ò̞.bó̞ɴ̀]) or just Bon (盆; [bó̞ɴ̀] (Note: Bon is a polysemous word. This accented pronunciation is specific to the festival. Its more common sense, "tray", goes with an unaccented pronunciation, [bò̞ɴ́, (ò̞.)bó̞ɴ́], instead.)) is a fusion of the ancient Japanese belief in ancestral spirits and a Japanese Buddhist custom to honor the spirits of one's ancestors. This syncretic folk Buddhist custom has evolved into a family reunion holiday during which people return to ancestral family places and visit and clean their ancestors' graves when the spirits of ancestors are supposed to revisit the household altars. It has been celebrated in Japan for more than 500 years and traditionally includes a dance, known as Bon Odori.

The festival of Obon lasts for three days; however, its starting date varies within different regions of Japan. When the lunar calendar was changed to the Gregorian calendar at the beginning of the Meiji era, the localities in Japan responded differently, which resulted in three different times of Obon. Traditionally, Obon was celebrated on the 15th day of the seventh month of the lunar calendar.

Obon is now observed during one of the following periods:

- July 15 of the Gregorian calendar (Shichigatsu Bon or "Bon in July"): Observed in Tokyo and some urban areas of the Tōhoku and Hokuriku regions where agricultural busy seasons do not overlap with the festival dates. This practice is sometimes referred to as "Tokyo Obon."
- August 15 of the Gregorian calendar (Hachigatsu Bon or "Bon in August"; Tsukiokure Bon or "Month Later Obon"): This is the most commonly celebrated time across Japan.

These days are not listed as public holidays, but it is customary for people to be given leave.

Within the Japanese diaspora, the obon is usually tied to a fundraising event for a temple, church, and even non-sectarian Japanese community organizations. As a result, Japanese organizations within a particular region will often coordinate their dates on different weekends throughout the summer as the participants were not expected to be given leave during the workweek if the date fell on a weekday, and to allow for the greater community to support each other's events. It isn't uncommon for families in regions with a larger Japanese emigrant population to visit multiple festivals in support of the greater community.

== History of Obon matsuri ==
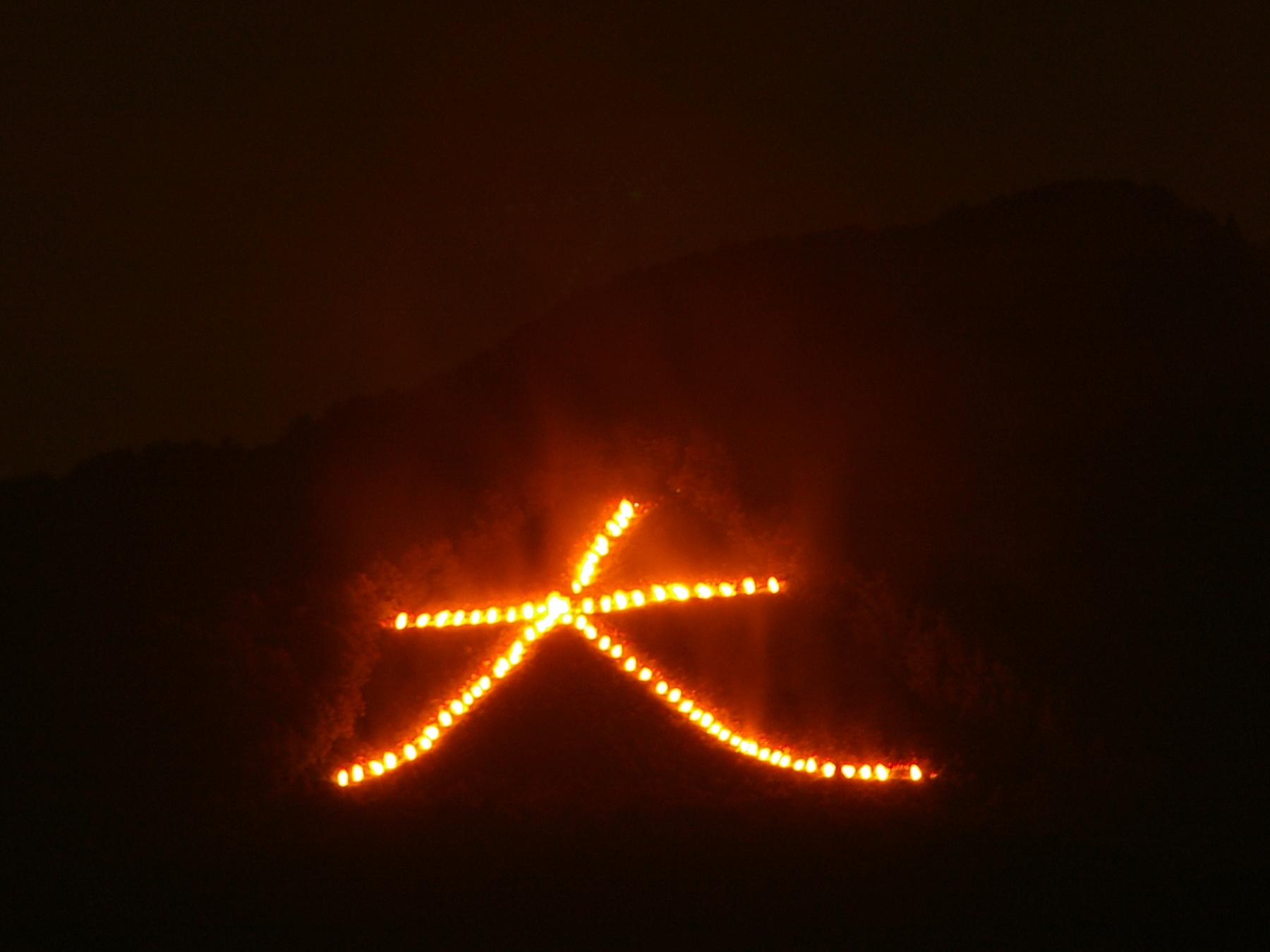
Kyoto's Gozan no Okuribi bonfire lit during the Obon festival

(video) Neighborhood Bon Odori festival in Adachi-ku, Tokyo (2014)

The Japanese Obon Festival is heavily influenced by the Ghost Festival of Buddhism and the Chinese Taoist Zhongyuan (中元) Festival.

Before Buddhism came to Japan, there was already a custom in place to beckon the deceased home to their families twice a year, both in spring and autumn, on the night of the full moon. This custom already had a close connection to the ancestor-veneration characteristic it has in modernity.

The Buddhist tradition originates from the story of Maha Maudgalyayana (Mokuren), a disciple of the Buddha, who used his supernatural powers to look upon his deceased mother only to discover she had fallen into the Realm of Hungry Ghosts and was suffering. Greatly disturbed, he went to the Buddha and asked how he could release his mother from this realm. Buddha instructed him to make offerings to the many Buddhist monks who had just completed their summer retreat on the fifteenth day of the seventh month. Mokuren did this and, thus, saw his mother's release. He also began to see the true nature of her past selflessness and the sacrifices she had made for him during her lifetime. The disciple, happy because of his mother's release from suffering and grateful for her many kindnesses, danced with joy. From this dance of joy comes the Bon Odori or "Bon Dance", a time during which ancestors and their sacrifices are remembered and appreciated. See also: Ullambana Sutra.

In recorded history, Obon was practiced as a Buddhist tradition first under the reign of Empress Suiko (592–628). By 733, it seems to have been introduced as a customary Buddhist holiday in Japan within the court.

=== Etymology ===
The Japanese word obon is composed of the honorific prefix o- and the word bon. The bon portion is from the longer Japanese names Urabon (盂蘭盆) or Urabon'e (盂蘭盆会), in turn from the Chinese terms 盂蘭盆 (Yúlánpén) or 盂蘭盆會 (Yúlánpénhuì).

The Chinese terms are often described as deriving from Sanskrit ullambana meaning "hanging upside down", in reference to souls suffering in hell. However, the Sanskrit word was sparse, if at all, attested; in addition, it would be the present participle of verb Sanskrit ullamb ("to hang", intransitive), with no inherent "upside-down" meaning.

Moreover, neither the purported meaning of "hanging upside-down" nor the verifiable meaning of "hanging" match the semantics very well, given that the urabon ceremonies are about helping the dead, closer in meaning to the "helping" sense of the Pali verb ullumpana ("raising, helping"), present participle of ullumpati ("to raise up, to help"). This suggests that explanations of the dead hanging upside-down in hell are more likely to be folk etymologies based on a mistaken connection to the Sanskrit verb, rather than a more direct semantic link to the Pali. Alternatively, Takakusu Junjiro propounded that the origin was in fact Pali ullumbana, a colloquial corruption of the Pali ullumpana ("raising up; saving; helping"), and that the etymology was mistakenly attributed to Sanskrit.

== Practices ==
=== Bon Odori ===
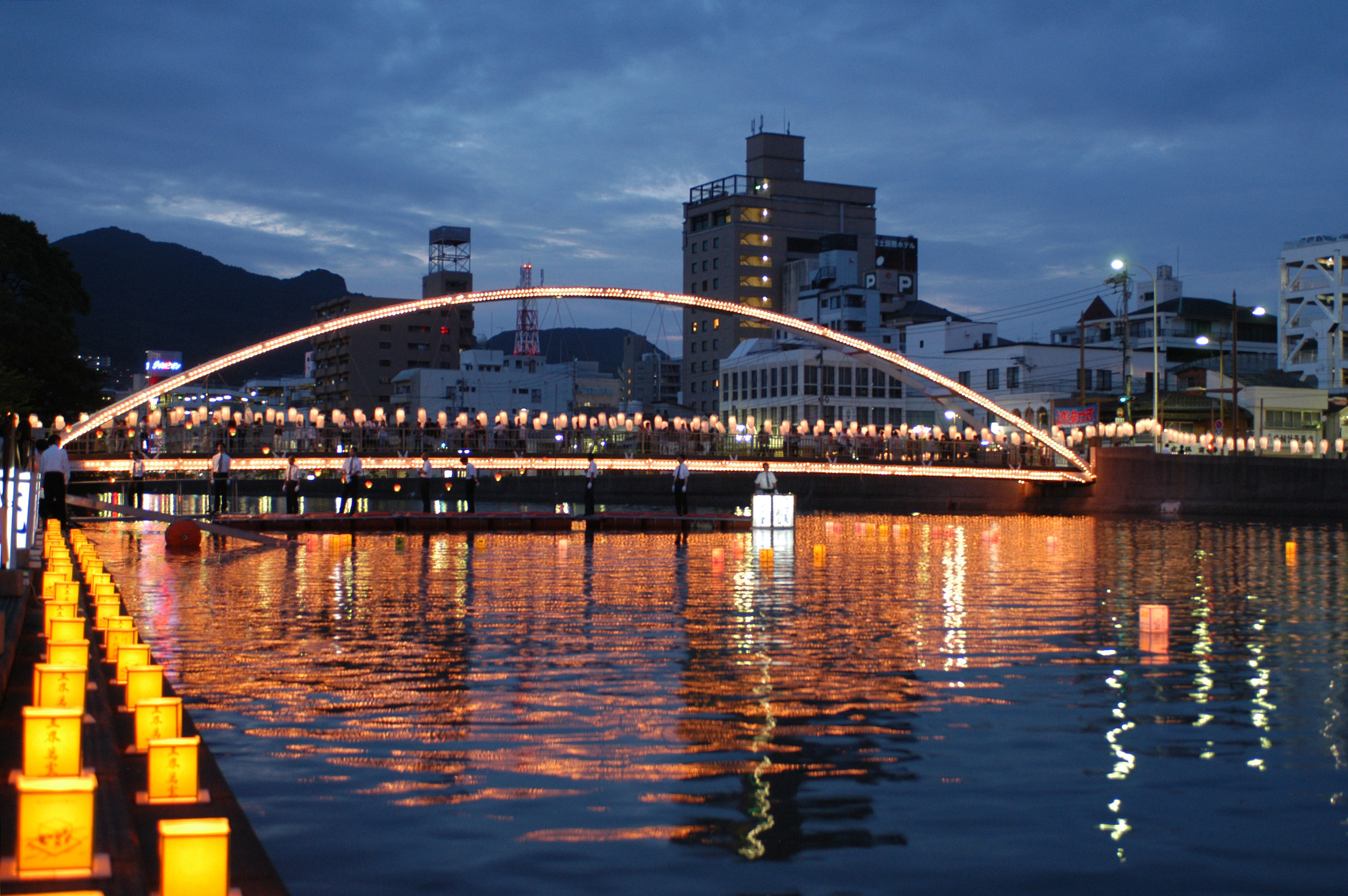
Participants place candlelit lanterns in the Sasebo River during Obon.

Bon Odori (盆踊り; [boɰ̃.oꜜ.do.ɾi], lit. 'Bon dance') is a style of dancing performed during Obon. It is a folk entertainment, which has a history of nearly 600 years. Originally a Nenbutsu folk dance to the spirits of the dead, the style of celebration varies in many aspects from region to region. Each region has a local dance, as well as different music. The music can be songs specifically pertinent to the spiritual message of Obon, or local min'yō folk songs. Consequently, the Bon dance appears different from region to region. Hokkaidō is known for the folk-song "Sōran Bushi". The song "Tokyo Ondo" takes its namesake from the capital of Japan. "Gujo Odori" in Gujō in Gifu Prefecture is famous for all night dancing. "Gōshū Ondo" is a folk song from Shiga Prefecture. Residents of the Kansai area will recognize the famous "Kawachi Ondo". Tokushima in Shikoku is very famous for its "Awa Odori", and in the far south, one can hear the "Ohara Bushi" of Kagoshima.

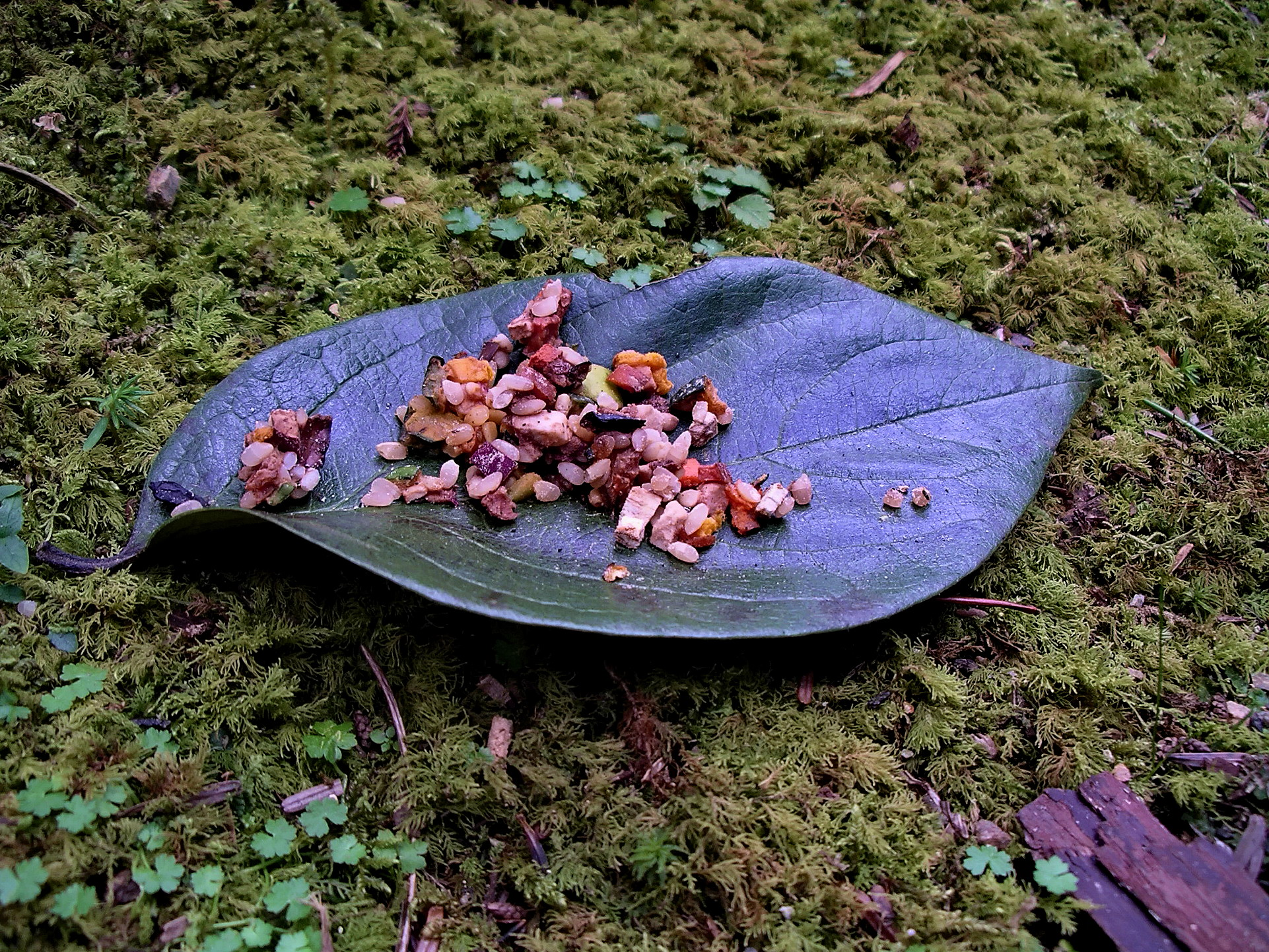
An Obon offering

The way in which the dance is performed is also different in each region, though the typical Bon dance involves people lining up in a circle around a high wooden scaffold made especially for the festival called a yagura. The yagura is usually also the bandstand for the musicians and singers of the Obon music. Some dances proceed clockwise, and some dances proceed counter-clockwise around the yagura. Some dances reverse during the dance, though most do not. At times, people face the yagura and move towards and away from it. Still some dances, such as the Kagoshima Ohara dance, and the Tokushima Awa Odori, simply proceed in a straight line through the streets of the town.

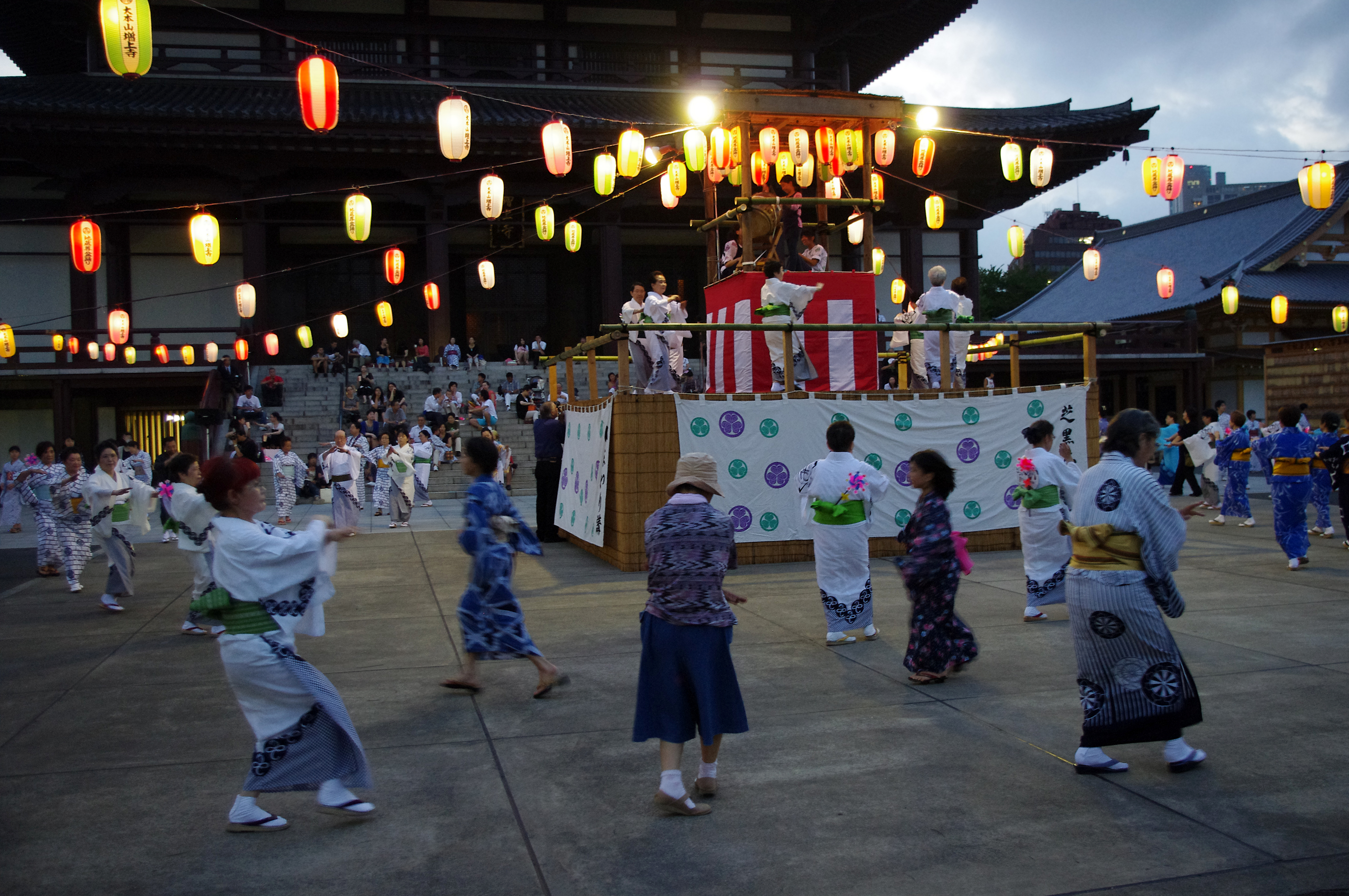
Bon Odori dancers (30 July 2010 at Zōjō-ji in Tokyo)

The dance of a region can depict the area's history and specialization. For example, the movements of the dance of the Tankō Bushi (the "coal mining song") of old Miike Mine in Kyushu show the movements of miners, i.e. digging, cart pushing, lantern hanging, etc.; the above-mentioned Soran Bushi mimics the work of fishermen such as hauling in the nets. All dancers perform the same dance sequence in unison.

There are other ways in which a regional Bon dance can vary. Some dances involve the use of different kinds of fans, others involve the use of small towels called tenugui which may have colorful designs. Some require the use of small wooden clappers, or "kachi-kachi", during the dance.

The music that is played during the Bon dance is not limited to Obon music and min'yō; some modern enka hits and kids' tunes written to the beat of the ondo are also used to dance to during Obon season.

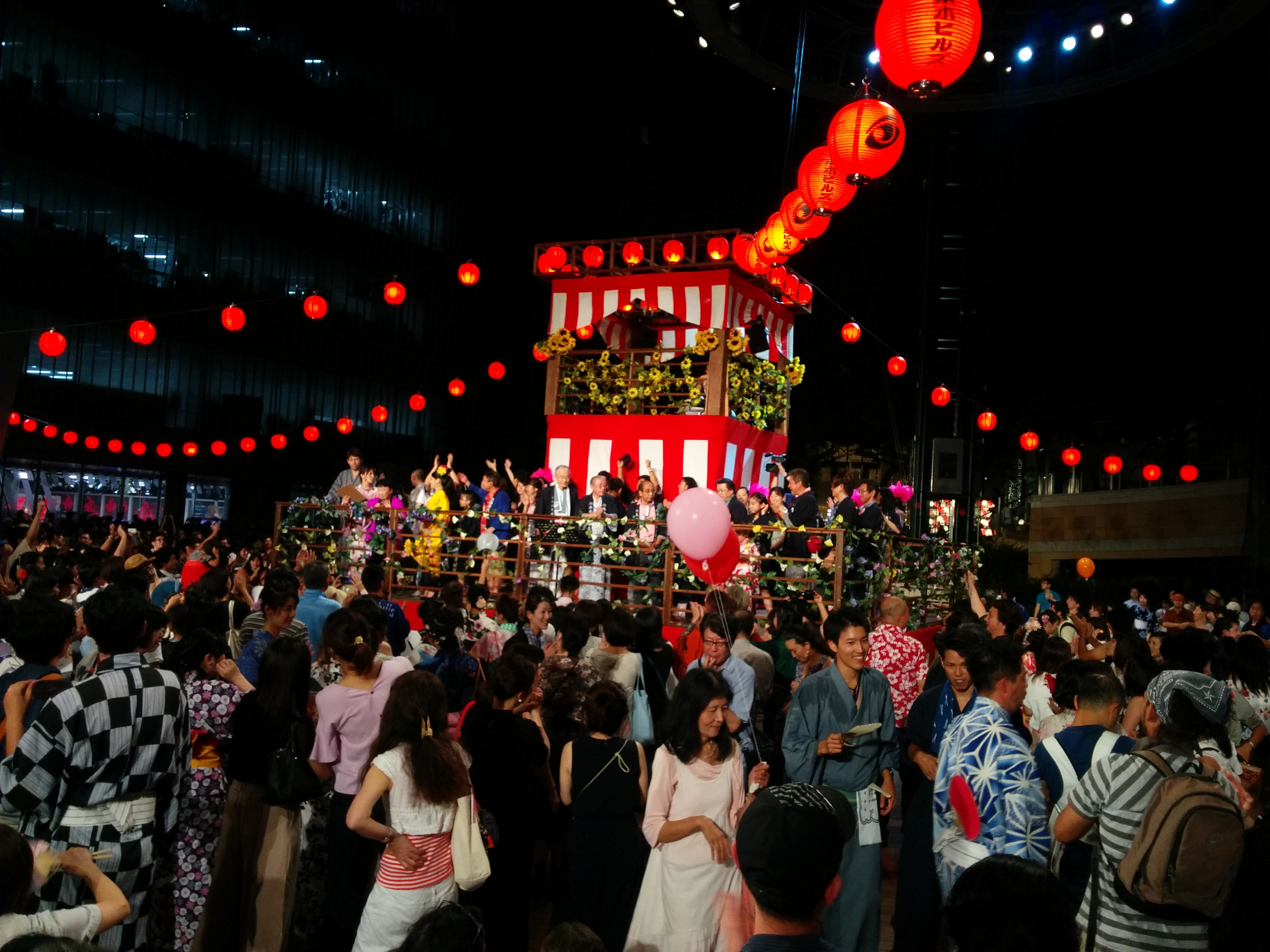
Bon Odori dancers (27 August 2017 at Roppongi Hills in Tokyo)

The Bon dance tradition is said to have started in the later years of the Muromachi period as a public entertainment. In the course of time, the original religious meaning has faded, and the dance has become associated with summer.

=== Altar ===
The altar in Japanese households, butsudan, are given care by the families with decorations and offerings such as flowers and straw figures of animals and food. They do this not only for their own deceased but for the souls of the households who no longer have relatives within their vicinity. The offerings are placed in front of the tablets with the deceased person's name on it.

=== Lights ===
Families who have lost a family member during a current year are known to give special attention to the preparations of Obon. They will light a small fire on the first evening of the festival to guide the souls back home. In the past people would light a line of lights towards the cemetery to make sure the souls would find their way.

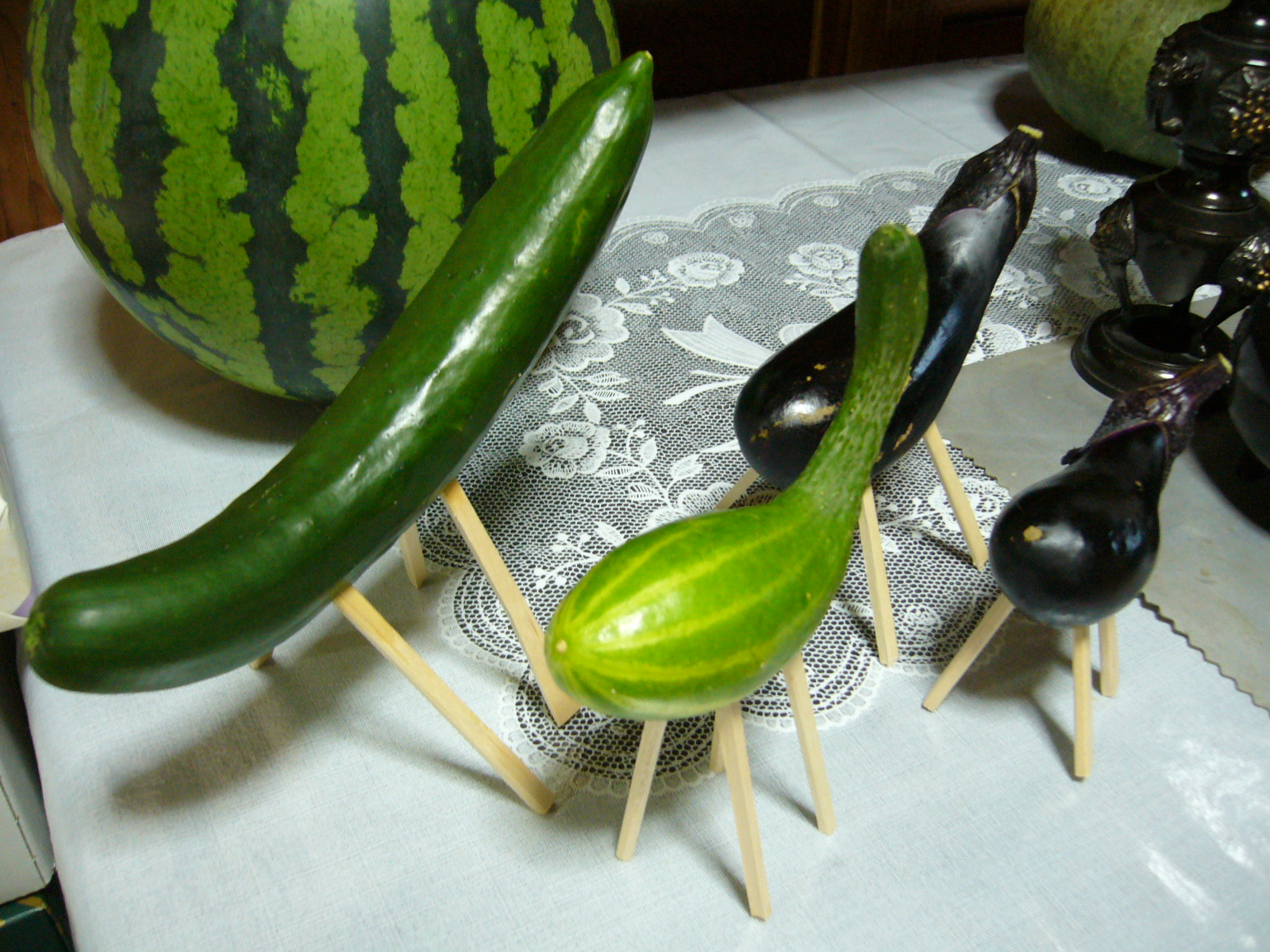
The shōryō uma (精霊馬, "spirit horse") or ushi uma (牛馬, "cow horse"), vegetable decorations made for O-bon

On the third day of the festivities the souls are sent back to the other side with fires to see them off, this is referred to as Okuribi ("sending fire"), or, in a larger scale, the Burning of the Character Big in the mountain. In this practice small lanterns are used that float down a river. This symbolises the way of the souls back to the world of the dead. Both these fires mark the commencement (mukaebi) as well of the closing of the festival.

=== Shōryō Uma and Ushi Uma ===
Another significant ritual practiced during the Obon festival in Japan is to craft a cucumber horse and eggplant cow, known as shōryō uma (精霊馬, "spirit horse") or ushi uma (牛馬, "cow horse"), that act as a vessel for the ancestors to come back home and return, respectively.

=== Clothing ===
As Obon occurs in the heat of the summer, participants traditionally wear yukata, a kind of light cotton kimono. Many Obon celebrations include a huge carnival with rides, games, and summer festival foods.

== Festivals of shared origin ==
=== Buddhism ===
==== Ryukyu Islands ====
Ryukyuans' version of the Obon celebration is known as Bun / Usōrō. Observed in Okinawa and the Amami Islands, this version follows the lunar calendar, so the dates change yearly on the Gregorian calendar, sometimes extending into September. The dance performed in the Okinawa Islands is known as eisā. Similarly, the Yaeyama Islands have Angama, Yonaguni Island have Suruburi.

==== Korea ====
The Korean version of the Obon celebration is known as Baekjung. Participants present offerings at Buddhist shrines and temples, and masked dances are performed. It is as much an agricultural festival as a religious one.

=== Hinduism ===
Pitri Paksha (literally "fortnight of the ancestors") is a 16–lunar day period in Hindu calendar when Hindus pay homage to their ancestors (Pitrs), especially through food offerings. Pitri Paksha is considered by Hindus to be inauspicious, given the death rite known as Śrāddha or Tarpana performed during the ceremony.

== Celebrations outside Japan ==
=== Philippines ===
In the Philippines, Filipinos of Japanese descent, with support from the Philippine Nikkei Jin Kai Inc., Philippine Nikkei Jin Kai International School, Mindanao Kokusai Daigaku, and various other Japanese Filipino-based organizations, hold an Obon festival every year along with other Japanese-based Filipino festivals, to celebrate the ancestors of Filipinos of Japanese descent, and to celebrate the friendship between Japan and the Philippines.

=== Argentina ===
In Argentina, the Obon Festival is celebrated by Japanese communities during the summer of the southern hemisphere. The biggest festival is held in Colonia Urquiza, in La Plata. It takes place on the sports ground of the La Plata Japanese School. The festival also includes taiko shows and typical dances.

=== Brazil ===
Obon Festival is celebrated every year in many Japanese communities all over Brazil, as Brazil is home to the largest Japanese population outside Japan. São Paulo is the main city of the Japanese community in Brazil, and also features the major festival in Brazil, with street odori dancing and matsuri dance. It also features taiko and shamisen contests. The festival also features a variety of Japanese food and drink, art and dance. Obon is also celebrated in communities of Japanese immigrants and their descendants and friends throughout South America: Obon festivals can be found in the states of Santa Catarina, São Paulo, Goiás, Amazonas, Pará (Tomé-Açu), Mato Grosso, Mato Grosso do Sul, Pernambuco, Bahia, Paraná, Rio Grande do Sul and Brasília.

=== Malaysia ===
In Malaysia, Obon Festival is also celebrated every year in Esplanade, Penang, Shah Alam Stadium in Shah Alam, Selangor, and also Universiti Malaysia Sabah at Kota Kinabalu, Sabah. This celebration, which is a major attraction for the state of Selangor, is the brainchild of the Japanese Expatriate & Immigrant's Society in Malaysia. In comparison to the celebrations in Japan, the festival is celebrated on a much smaller scale in Penang, Selangor and Sabah, and is less associated with Buddhism and more with Japanese culture. Held mainly to expose locals to a part of Japanese culture, the festival provides the experience of a variety of Japanese food and drinks, art and dance, with the vast number of Japanese companies in Malaysia taking part to promote their products.

=== United States and Canada ===
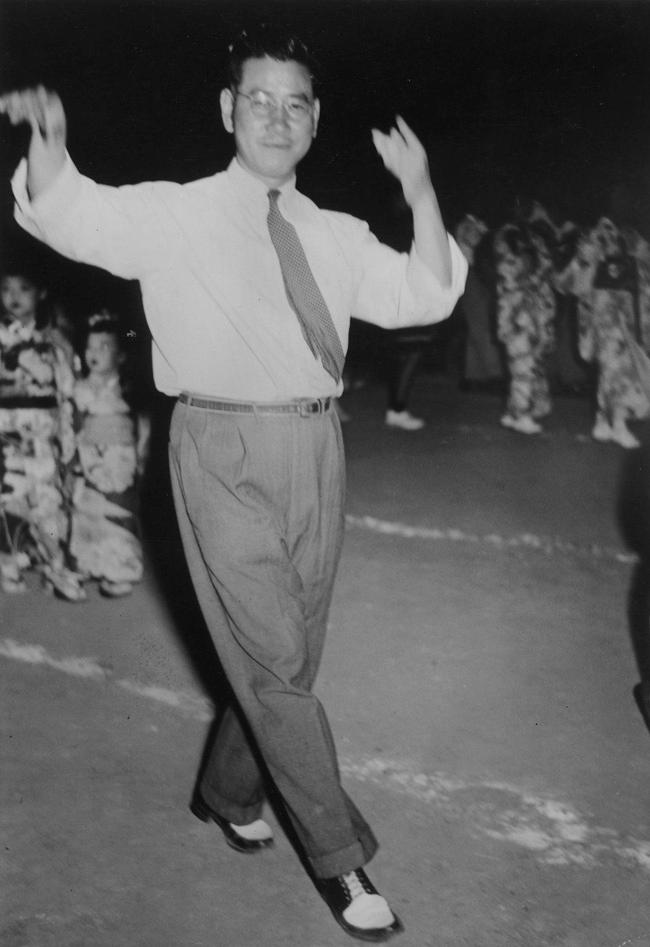
Yoshio Iwanaga demonstrates a bon odori.

Obon festivals have been celebrated in North America, particularly by Japanese-Americans or Japanese-Canadians affiliated with Buddhist temples and organizations. The first recorded obon in the U.S. was organized by Japanese emigrant laborers on a sugar plantation in Wainaku, Hawaii in 1885. Private obons were also organized by Japanese immigrant organizations in hotels and private residences on the West Coast with the first recorded event in 1923. Buddhist Reverend Yoshio Iwanaga has been credited with popularizing obon in America with the first public bon odori at the Buddhist Church of San Francisco in 1931. Iwanaga also organized the first major obon following WW2 in celebration of Buddhist Churches of America's (BCA) Golden Jubilee in 1948, with an bon odori at San Francisco's City Hall Plaza, attracting more than 1,000 participants.

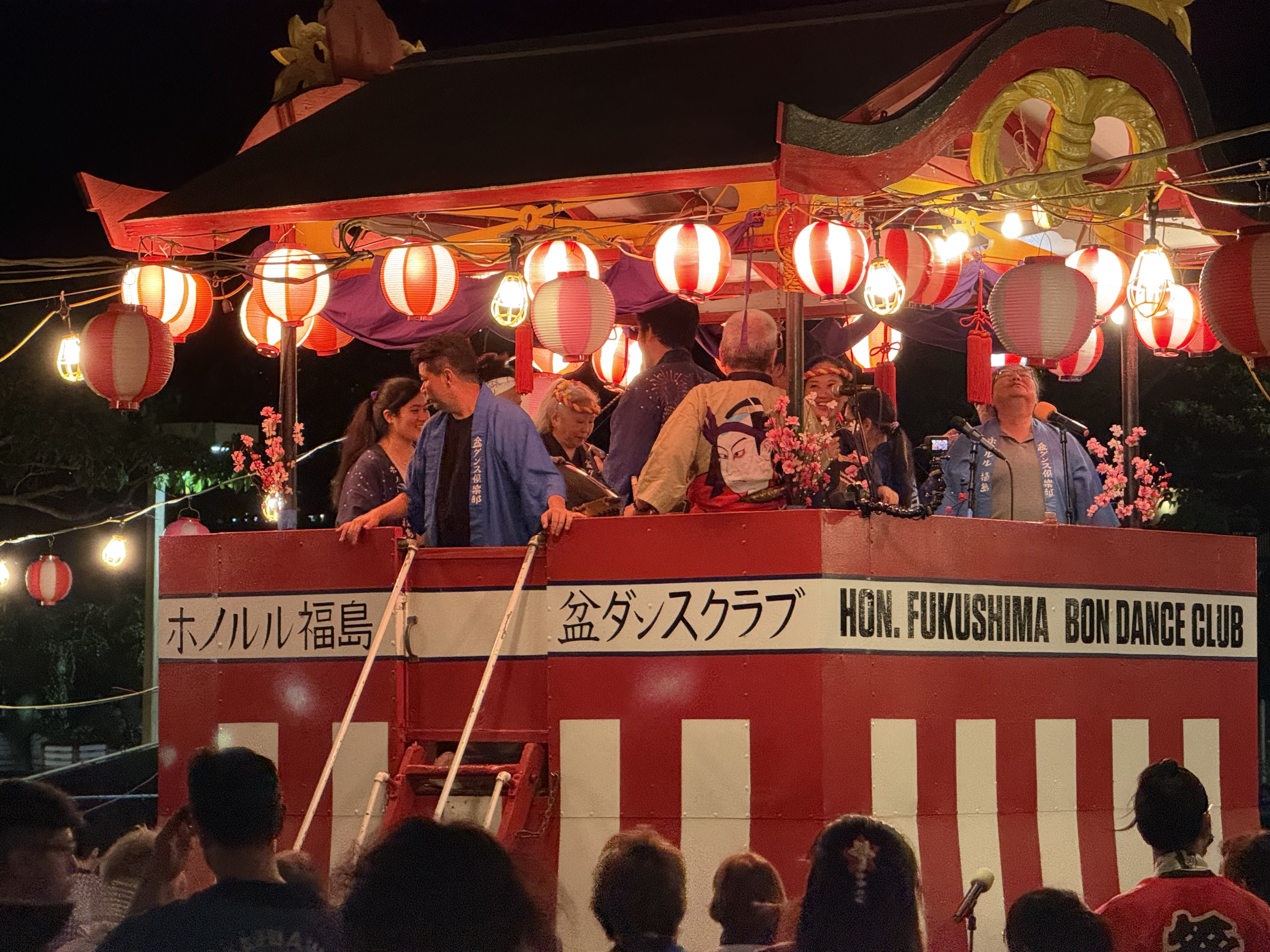
Bon dance yagura at the Honpa Hongwanji Mission of Hawaii

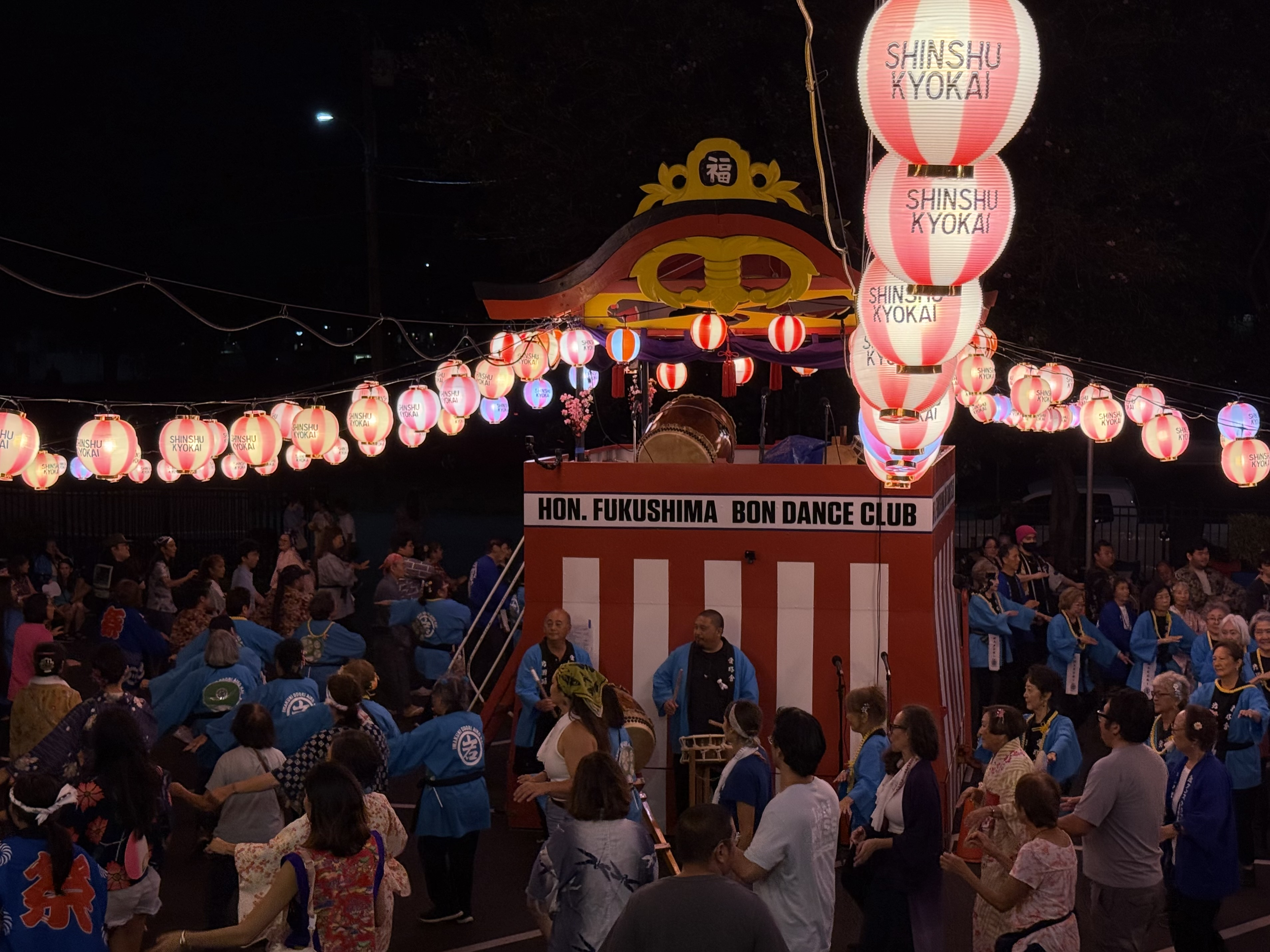
Bon dance yagura at Shinshu Kyokai

BCA temples in the U.S. typically celebrate Obon Festival with both religious obon observances and traditional Bon Odori dancing around a yagura. Many temples also hold a cultural and food bazaar providing a variety of cuisine, art, and taiko performances to display features of Japanese culture and Japanese-American history to the greater community. While obon festivals are usually coordinated between various organizations to allow participants to support fellow churches and temples within the Japanese-American community, as in Japan, regional variations to the dances can be found between different communities. Even some Japanese Christian churches in America have adopted some aspects of obon with cultural festivals in the spring tied to the Easter holiday.

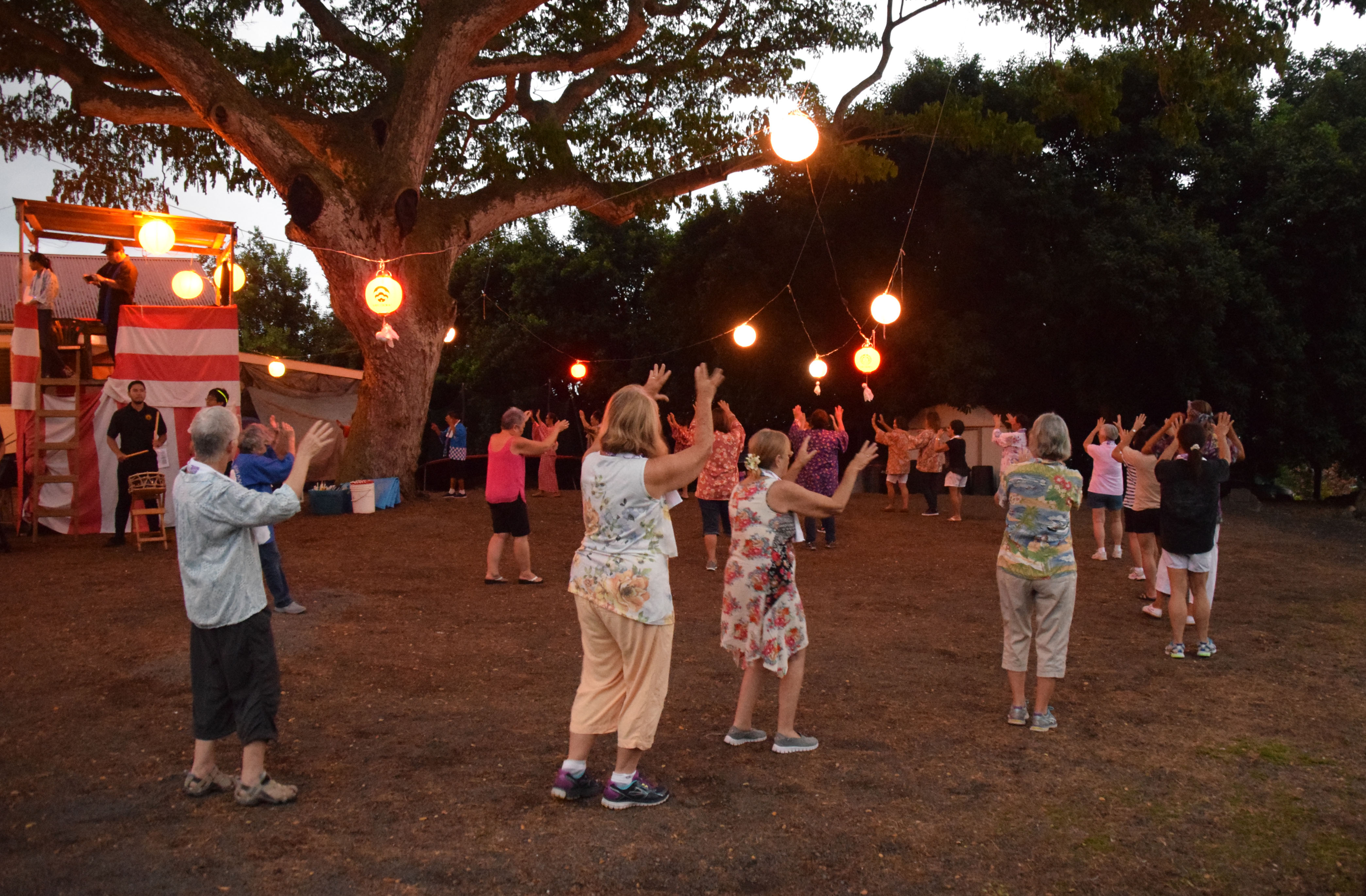
Bon dance in Ke'ei, Hawaii

The "Obon season" continues to play an important part of the present-day culture and life of Hawaii and are held among the five major islands on weekend evenings from June to August. They are held usually at Buddhist missions, but sometimes at Shinto missions or at shopping centers. At some Buddhist missions, the dance is preceded by a simple ritual where the families of the deceased in the past year burn incense for remembrance, but otherwise the event is non-sectarian. The songs played differ among the regions, however typically starts with Tankō Bushi from Kyushu, continues with songs such as Kawachi Otoko Bushi, Yukata Odori, Asatoya Yunta and Ashibina from Okinawa Prefecture, and modern dances such as the Baseball Ondo and Pokémon Ondo for children, and typically ends with Fukushima Ondo, celebrating abundant harvest. The participants, Japanese descendants and the people of all races, dance in a big circle around the yagura, the central tower set up for the dance, from which recorded songs are broadcast. As on the mainland, bon dance lessons are given by volunteers in larger cities before the actual events.

Japanese museums and other cultural organizations also hold summer festivals inspired by obon, such as the Morikami Museum in Florida, and the Japanese Botanical Garden in St. Louis, Missouri, which has hosted an Obon festival over Labor Day weekend every year since 1977. Known as the Japanese festival, it is a collaboration with several Japanese-American organizations, and hosts thousands of people over a three-day period.

== See also ==
- Awa Dance Festival
- Day of the Dead, a Mexican festival also revolving around the dead
- Ghost Festival, the Chinese counterpart of the Obon Festival.
- Japanese calendar
- Japanese culture
- Parentalia, a festival in ancient Rome to honor ancestors, including bringing offerings to them on the last day, known as Feralia
- Pitru Paksha, a Hindu festival that bears similarities to the Obon festival
- Qingming Festival
- Segaki, the concept of offering food to the hungry ghosts in Japanese Buddhism
- Śrāddha, a Hindu culture celebrated for half moon cycle to give the offerings and honor ancestors. Celebrated in all Indian State.
- Takeda Lullaby, a folk lullaby from the Kyoto region in which the Obon Festival is mentioned
- Veneration of the dead

== Bibliography ==
- Marinus Willem de Visser: Ancient Buddhism in Japan – Sutras and Ceremonies in Use in the 7th and 8th centuries A.D. and their History in Later Times, volume 1, Paul Geuthner, Paris 1928–1931; Brill, Leiden 1935, pp. 58–115
- Robert J. Smith: Ancestor Worship in Contemporary Japan, Stanford University Press, Stanford, California 1974. ISBN 0-8047-0873-8
- Ensho Ashikaga (1950), The Festival for the Spirits of the Dead in Japan, Western Folklore 9 (3), 217–228 (registration required)
