= Tankō Bushi =

Japanese folk song

The Tankō Bushi originated at Miike Mine, Kyushu, Japan.

Tankō Bushi (炭坑節) is a Japanese folk song. Despite the term "fushi/bushi" found in its name, the rhythm is in swung, ondo style. It is a song about coal mining, and it refers to old Miike Mine in Kyūshū (Omuta). It is a common song used in Bon dances during the Bon Festival, and the dance that accompanies it depicts actions in mines such as shoveling coal, throwing a bag of coal over the shoulders, shading the eyes from the sun, pushing a cart of coal and a ceremonial bow as captured on the notes by Folk Music International.

== Excerpt from Tankō Bushi ==
Japanese:

Tsuki ga deta deta
Tsuki ga deta, a yoi yoi
Miike Tankō no ue ni deta
Anmari entotsu ga takai no de
Sazoya otsukisan kemutakaro
Sa no yoi yoi

Rough English translation:

The moon, has come out,
Oh, the moon is out, heave ho (kakegoe)
Over Miike Coal Mine has the moon come out.
The chimney is so high,
I wonder if the moon chokes on the smoke...
Heave Ho!

Modern arrangements of Tankō Bushi replace the lyric "Miike Tankō" with "uchi no oyama," which in traditional mining dialect means "our coal mine" or "our coal pit," as Miike Mine is no longer in service, and the song is played at Bon dances outside of Kyūshū.

== History ==
The song was recorded in Japan in 1932. It was originally recorded on 78 RPM as Victor V-41543 featuring Suzuki Masao and Kikumaru. This recording features five verses, with Suzuki Masao singing verses 1, 3 and 5 and Kikumaru singing verses 2, 4 and 5.

A popular version is the 1963 commercial rerecording of Victor V-41543 featuring Suzuki Masao and Kikumaru with the Victor Orchestra. It was released as a 45 RPM as Victor of Japan, MV-1 (JES-1041). A second release of the 45 RPM was Victor of Japan MVK-1.

A very similar recording of Suzuki Masao and Kikumaru with Japanese musicians was made in 1950. It was the version of Tanko Bushi most commonly heard at the Bon Dances in Hawaii during the second half of the 1900's. It was recorded in Japan by Yoshio Nakayama and released by The Folk Dancer Record Service as a 78 RPM MH 2010a. This recording features five verses, with Suzuki Masao singing verses 1, 3 and 5 and Kikumaru on verses 2, 4 and 5. It lacks the four measure interlude after versus 2 and 4 from the JES-1041 version.

== Video ==
- Tanko Bushi - featuring the 1963 recording - Public Performance
