= Public holidays in Cambodia =

Cambodia has numerous public holidays, including memorial holidays and religious holidays of Buddhist origin. The Khmer traditional calendar, known as ចន្ទគតិ Chănteăkeătĕ, is a lunisolar calendar although the word itself means lunar calendar. While the calendar is based on the movement of the moon, calendar dates are also synchronized with the solar year to keep the seasons from drifting.

Therefore, some public holidays are subject to change every year based on the lunar calendar.

== Public holidays ==
Name	Date	Remarks
New Year's Day បុណ្យចូលឆ្នាំសកល	January 1	Celebrates the beginning of the Gregorian New Year
Victory over Genocide Day ទិវាជ័យជម្នះលើរបបប្រល័យពូជសាសន៍	January 7	Commemorates the end of the Khmer Rouge regime in 1979
International Women's Day ទិវានារីអន្តរជាតិ	March 8	Commemorates the history of women around the world
Khmer New Year ពិធីបុណ្យចូលឆ្នាំថ្មី ប្រពៃណីជាតិ	April 13-16	The traditional Cambodian solar New Year lasts three days mostly (14,15,16) and some years has 4 days (13,14,15,16) and is considered to be the most important festival on the calendar.
Labour Day ទិវាពលកម្មអន្តរជាតិ	May 1	Celebrates the economic and social achievements of workers
Visak Bochea Day ពិធិបុណ្យវិសាខបូជា	Moveable, April or May	Buddha's Birthday is celebrated as Visak Bochea where monks around the country carry the Buddhist flag, lotus flowers, incense, and candles to acknowledge Vesak.
Royal Ploughing Ceremony ព្រះរាជពិធីច្រត់ព្រះនង្គ័ល	Moveable, April or May	Corresponds to the start of the planting season
King Sihamoni's Birthday ព្រះរាជពិធីបុណ្យចម្រើនព្រះជន្មព្រះករុណាព្រះបាទសម្ដេចព្រះបរមនាថ នរោត្ដម សីហមុនី	May 14	Celebrates the birthday of King Norodom Sihamoni on May 14, 1953.
Queen Mother's Birthday ព្រះរាជពិធីបុណ្យចម្រើនព្រះជន្មព្រះមហាក្សត្រី នរោត្ដម មុនីនាថ សីហនុ	June 18	Celebrates the birthday of Queen Mother Norodom Monineath on June 18, 1936.
Constitution Day ទិវាប្រកាសរដ្ឋធម្មនុញ្ញ	September 24	Commemorates the signing of the Cambodian constitution by King Norodom Sihanouk.
Pchum Ben ពិធីបុណ្យភ្ជុំបិណ្ឌ	3 days Moveable, September or October	This national holiday was established for Buddhists to pay their respects to deceased relatives by cooking meals for monks and making offerings to the "ghost" of deceased relatives. It is also known as "Ancestor's Day".
Commemoration Day of the King's Father ព្រះរាជពិធីគោរពព្រះវិញ្ញាណក្ខន្ធព្រះករុណាព្រះបាទសម្ដេចព្រះ នរោត្ដម សីហនុ	October 15	Commemorates King Norodom Sihanouk, the founding father of independent Cambodia, who died on this day in 2012.
Coronation Day of King Sihamoni ព្រះរាជពិធីគ្រងព្រះបរមរាជសម្បត្តិរបស់ព្រះករុណាព្រះបាទសម្ដេចព្រះបរមនាថ នរោត្ដម សីហមុនី	October 29	Commemorates the 2004 coronation of King Sihamoni.
Independence Day ទិវាបុណ្យឯករាជ្យជាតិ	November 9	Celebrates Cambodia's independence from France in 1953.
Water Festival ពិធីបុណ្យអុំទូក បណ្ដែតប្រទីប អកអំបុក និងសំពះព្រះខែ	3 days Moveable, October or November	Commemorates ancient Cambodian navy soldiers under King Jayavarman VII during the Khmer Empire.
Peace Day ទិវាសន្តិភាព	December 29	Commemorates the formal surrender of all Khmer Rouge forces in 1998.

== Other festivals ==
Name	Date	Remarks
Dough Sokheng Festival	November or December	Exactly one month after the Water Festival, the Festival of Kite Flying follows and brings together kite makers to demonstrate their talents in the full-moon night of Maksir, the first month of the Khmer lunar calendar, which usually falls in November or December. For Khmers, the festival means an occasion to pray for good weather, good harvest of crops, and a favorable situation free from destruction by floods or heavy rains. In Khmer folklore, the kite has always symbolized many things. A good number of locals hold the Festival of Kite Flying annually and wish for peace, freedom, and happiness for everyone.
Silkworm Festival	September	The festival is held on a full-moon day in September every year. The traditions had been almost disappearing in the long civil war. And the traditions were revived by the hands of the experienced elderly women who slightly kept the memories. This is a festival to celebrate Cambodia's long history of silk textiles.
Chinese New Year Festival	January or February	Chinese New Year, or Spring Festival, has been broadly celebrated in Cambodia thanks to the country's respect for cultural diversity and close relationship between the peoples of the two countries. It is often celebrated by Cambodian citizens regardless of ethnic background as it if commonly believed that the festival brings luck. Lion dance or "Mong Say" as referred by the locals is often seen throughout the country and many businesses close down as family go home to spend time with their families.
Hei Neak Ta	January or February	Known as the Hei Neak Ta, or Spirit Parade, the festival is held each year to mark the official end of the Chinese New Year celebrations in a uniquely Khmer manner. While the holiday is known as the Lantern festival in other parts of Asia, and is celebrated solely on the 15th day of the lunar calendar, festivities in Cambodia can go on for three to four days and often feature elaborate parades with a wide range of spirit mediums.
Mid Autumn Festival	September or October	More commonly called "Full Moon Festival" by locals (as Cambodia does not have an Autumn season). Cambodians organize "the traditional festival of prostrating the moon". In that early morning, people start preparing sacrifices to worship the Moon, including fresh flowers, cassava soup, flat rice, and sugar cane juice. At night, people put the sacrifices into a tray, place on a big mat, and sit at ease waiting for the Moon. When the Moon rises up over the top of a branch, everyone whole-heartedly worships the Moon, implores blessings. After the ritual of worshipping the Moon, the old take flat rice to put into the mouths of children until they are entirely full in order to pray for perfection, and good things. Although this is a Chinese festival, many Cambodians celebrate this festival as it is believed that exchanging moon cake during this time is thought to bring luck and prosperity. Among Cambodians, this holiday is associated with Khmer beliefs of "Praying to the Moon" and the Buddhist legend of the rabbit.
Qingming Festival	April	The Qingming Festival, also known as Tomb Sweeping Day (or "Chheng Meng among the Khmer locals), is a Chinese festival when people bring food and drinks to the graves of their ancestors. In Cambodia, this festival is largely associated with Pchum Ben Festival and is mainly a chance for people to pray for happiness, success and promotion.
Siem Reap Puppet Parade	February	A festival celebrated in Siem Reap that commemorates the artistic ability of the locals in the area. It shows a large display of giant puppets as well as showcasing traditional shadow puppet plays. It first began in 2007 and has since then gained widespread popularity.
