= Ondo (music) =

Type of Japanese folk music genre

Ondo (音頭) is a type of Japanese folk music genre.

== Etymology and description ==
The literal translation of "ondo" is "sound head." Kanji, or the Chinese characters used in the Japanese language, often have literal and abstract meanings, here the kanji for "sound" (音-on) having a more abstract meaning of "melody" or "music," and the kanji for "head," (頭) having a more abstract meaning of "beat," "base pattern." Hence "ondo" probably refers to a kind of "sound" or "beat pattern."

There are other names used to describe older Japanese genres of music. For example, "fushi" or "bushi" (節), with its literal meaning of "node," "knuckle," or "joint," refers to the nodes found in bamboo, usually found at a steady sequence. Thus "fushi" can also have the abstract idea of "sequence" to refer to notes and beats in a sequence, i.e., a melody.

An "ondo," however, usually refers to a kind of song with a distinct swung 2/2 rhythm. This "swing" can be referred to as "ukare" in Japanese. "Ondo" is a term used in older Japanese genres, but it is still used today when referring to songs written in this swinging style. Sometimes the rhythm is not swung and it is played straight through. This is called "kizami".

Not every old Japanese melody with a swung rhythm is called an "ondo," as sometimes the term "fushi" or "bushi" is used to refer to a tune with a swung 2/2 rhythm, both of these having more or less the same meaning of "tune" or "melody." The folk song Goshu Ondo, for example, does not follow this rule, as the rhythm is not played in a swung fashion. The folk song Tankō Bushi has a swung 2/2 rhythm, even though it has "bushi" in its name.

In Japanese folk music, "fushi" and "ondo" follow the name of the song. For example, Tokyo Ondo, Mamurogawa Ondo, and Hanagasa Ondo all have "ondo" in their names. Kushimoto fushi, Burabura fushi, and Soran fushi all have a rendering of "fushi" in their names.

== Folk music and Obon ==
Part of the Japanese Obon celebration involves participating in the local community dance. The tradition of the Bon dance, or Bon odori (盆踊り), dates back a few hundred years, and it is usually accompanied by the local tune. In recent times, new music has been used for Bon dance accompaniment, including late enka hits and music written specifically for bon dancing. The "ondo" rhythm has always been common in Japanese folk music, but even the newer music written for Bon dances has been written in this style.

It is common to find names of newer music with the word "ondo" attached to it. For example, Japanese franchises such as anime, video games and tokusatsu TV series have their own ondo: Umamusume's Tracen Ondo, the "Pekopon Shinryaku Ondo" (from Sergeant Frog), the Pokémon Ondo, the Naruto Ondo, the Hunter x Hunter Ondo, the Doraemon Ondo, Ojamajo Doremi Ondo, Ondo of Puyo Puyo, Shiawase Kyoryu Ondo, the Love Live! Sunshine!! Sunshine Pikkapika Ondo, and even the Super Sentai series has several ondo songs such as Carranger Ondo, Bomb Dancing Megaranger, Hurricane Ondo, Bakuryu Kazoeuta, Let's Go On-do, Minna Summer DAY Ondo, Kyutama Ondo, Gyakuten Agesage Ondo and the Party People Ondo. There is fan-made Touhou Ondo and DoDonPachi Ondo. Ondo were commonly used as the opening themes for anime in the 1960s and 70s, especially with Tatsunoko Productions.

Even non-ondo music is starting to make the bon dance scene. The selection ranges from traditional sounding enka, such as Hikawa Kiyoshi's "Zundoko-bushi," to more modern non-Japanese hits, such as the Beach Boys' "Kokomo".

== Other uses ==
The Tokyo Ondo has been used by the Tokyo Yakult Swallows as part of their "Umbrella Dance" tradition every time a player scores a home run or during the "Lucky 7", in which they do the Umbrella Dance before they are up to bat in the 7th inning. The Tokyo Ondo would be the music that would be played while they do the Umbrella Dance, in which fans wave mini-umbrellas.
