= Ghost Festival =

Traditional Buddhist and Taoist festival

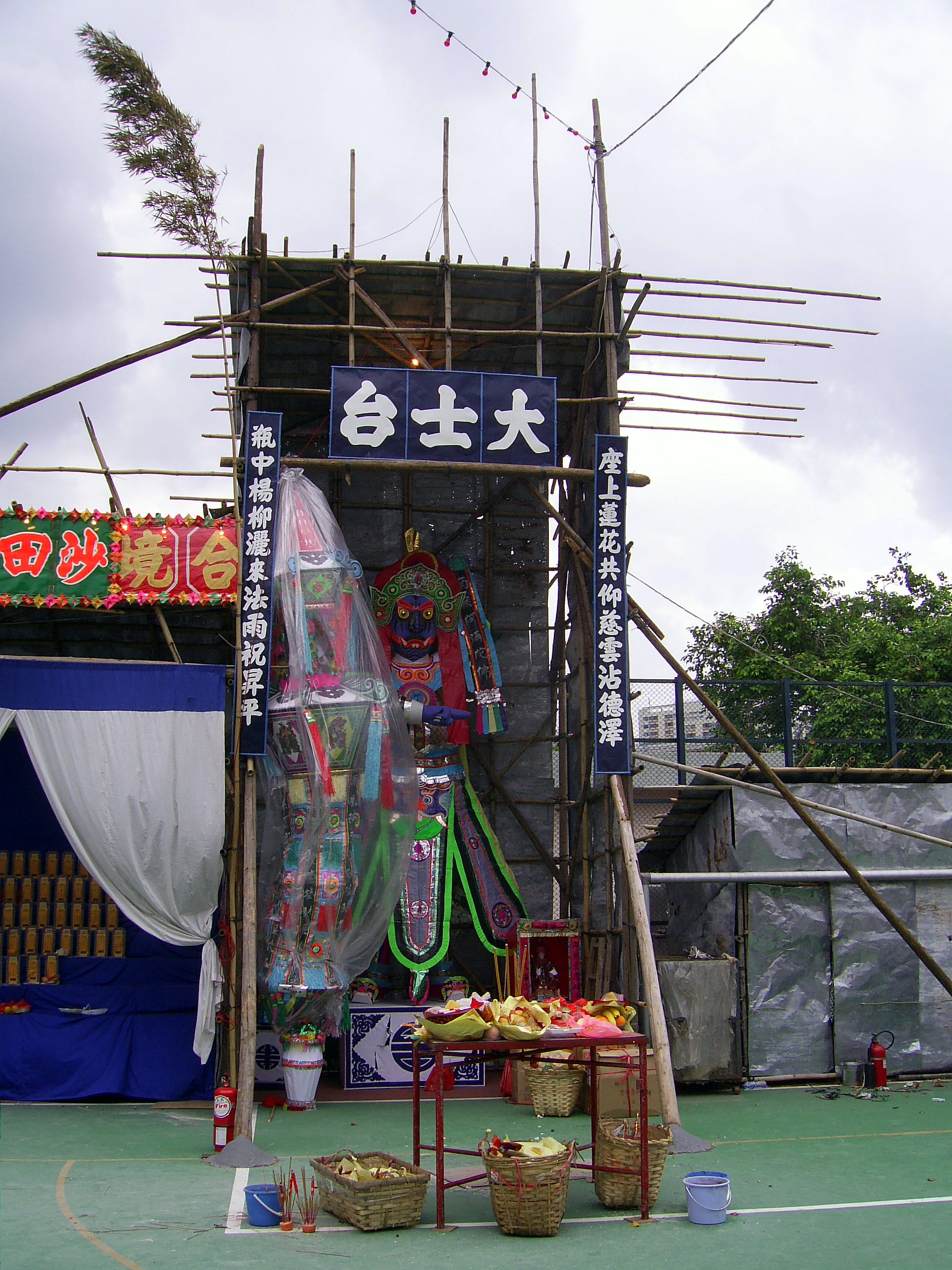
- A paper effigy of the Guanyin in Shatin, Hong Kong.
- Official name: Zhongyuan Festival (Taoism); Yulanpen Festival (Buddhism)
- Also called: Spirit Festival
- Observed by: Buddhists; Confucianists; Taoists
- Significance: To commemorate the opening of the gates of Hell and Heaven, and spiritual realm permitting all spirits and souls to receive sustenance, money, and other offerings.
- Observances: Ancestor worship, offering food, burning joss paper, chanting of scriptures
- Date: 15th day of the 7th Chinese lunisolar month
- 2025 date: 6 September
- 2026 date: 27 August
- 2027 date: 16 August
- 2028 date: 3 September
- Related to: Obon (in Japan); Baekjung (in Korea); Vu Lan (in Vietnam); Pchum Ben (observed by Khmer people) and Sen Kbal tek, សែនក្បាលទឹក (observed by Chinese-Cambodians) (in Cambodia); Boun Khao Padap Din (in Laos); Mataka dānēs (in Sri Lanka); Sat Thai (in Thailand)

Ghost Festival
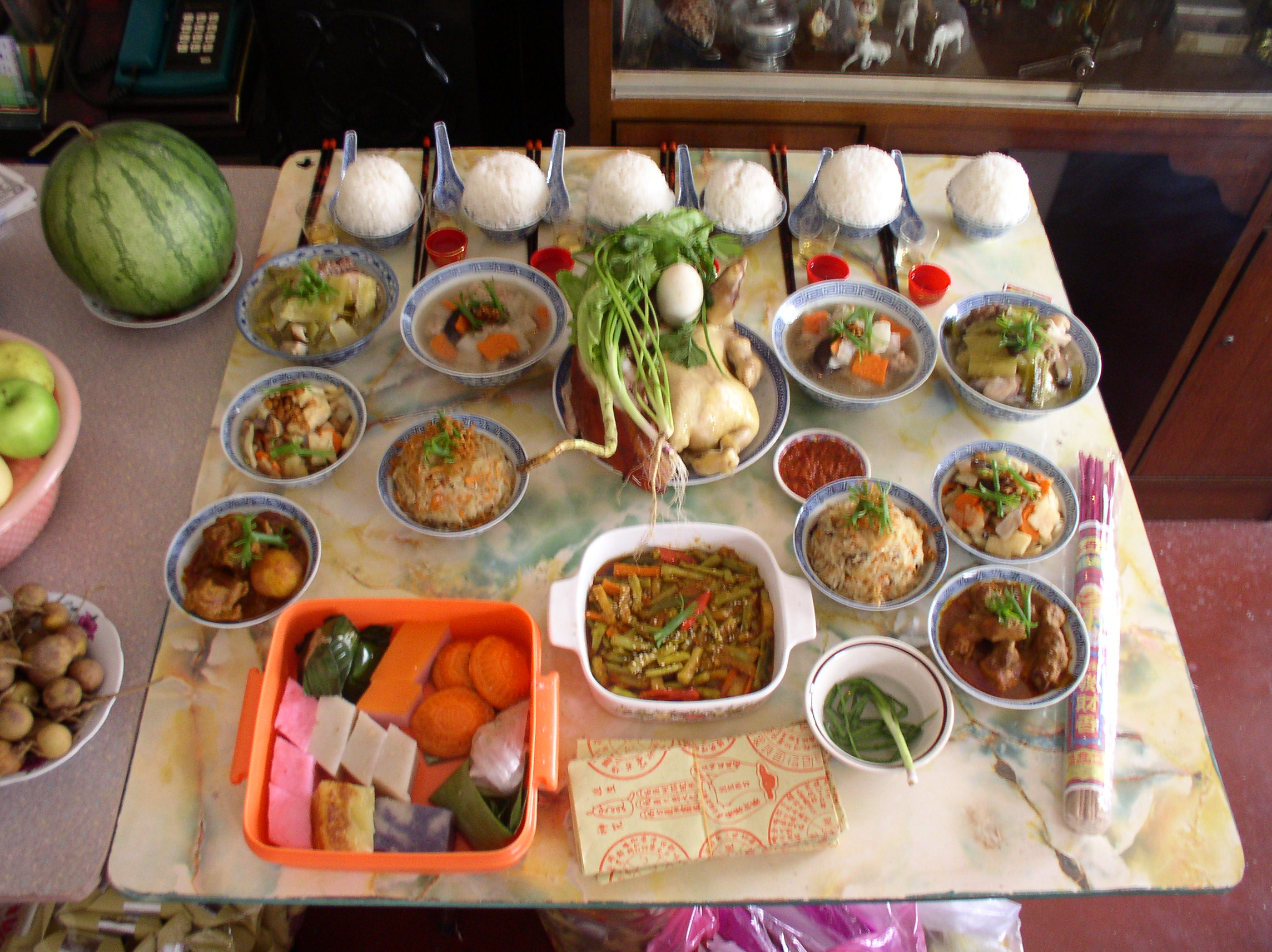
- Food offerings for the Ghost Festival
- Traditional Chinese: 中元節
- Simplified Chinese: 中元节
- Literal meaning: mid-origin festival
Transcriptions
Standard Mandarin
- Hanyu Pinyin: zhōng yuán jié
- Bopomofo: ㄓㄨㄥ ㄩㄢˊㄐㄧㄝˊ
- Wade–Giles: chung yüan^{2} chieh^{2}
- Yale Romanization: jūng ywán jyé
Hakka
- Pha̍k-fa-sṳ: Chûng-ngièn-chiet
Yue: Cantonese
- Yale Romanization: jūng yùhn jit
- Jyutping: zung^{1} jyun^{4} zit^{3}
Southern Min
- Hokkien POJ: Tiong-goân-cheh / Tiong-goân-choeh / Tiong-goân-chiat
- Tâi-lô: Tiong-guân-tseh / Tiong-guân-tsueh / Tiong-guân-tsiat
- Teochew Peng'im: Dong^{1} nguêng^{5}/nguang^{5} zoih^{4}
Eastern Min
- Fuzhou BUC: Dṳ̆ng-nguòng-cáik

Alternative Chinese name
- Traditional Chinese: 盂蘭盆節
- Simplified Chinese: 盂兰盆节
Transcriptions
Standard Mandarin
- Hanyu Pinyin: Yú lán pén jié
- Bopomofo: ㄩˊㄌㄢˊㄆㄣˊㄐㄧㄝˊ
- Wade–Giles: yü^{2} lan^{2} p'ên^{2} chieh^{2}
- Yale Romanization: yú-lán-pén-jyé
Yue: Cantonese
- Yale Romanization: yùh làahn pùhn jit
- Jyutping: jyu^{4} laan^{4} pun^{4} zit^{3}
Eastern Min
- Fuzhou BUC: Uò-làng-buòng

Second alternative Chinese name
- Chinese: 七月半
Transcriptions
Hakka
- Pha̍k-fa-sṳ: Chhit-ngie̍t-pan
Southern Min
- Hokkien POJ: Chhit-goe̍h-poàⁿ
- Tâi-lô: Tshit-gue̍h-puànn
- Teochew Peng'im: Cig^{4} ghuêh^{8} buan^{3}

The Ghost Festival or Hungry Ghost Festival, also known as the Zhongyuan Festival in Taoism and the Yulanpen Festival in Buddhism, is a traditional festival held in certain East and Southeast Asian countries. According to the traditional Chinese lunisolar calendar, the Ghost Festival is on the 15th night of the seventh month (14th in parts of southern China). (Note: Chow, page 4, quoting 1783 Qianlong era "Annals of Guishan County" (歸善縣志) Scroll 15 – Customs: '鬼節原是農曆七月十五，但元末明初之際，有言客家為了躲避元兵，提前一日過節，以便南下走難，自此鬼節就變成七月十四，流傳至今。' English translation: 'The Ghost Festival originally was on the 15th day of the 7th month in the Chinese calendar, but during the late Yuan to early Ming period, it's said that the Hakkas in order to escape the Yuan troops, celebrated the Ghost Festival one day earlier, in order to escape disaster they fled southward. Since that time and continuing today, the date of the Ghost Festival changed to the 14th day of the 7th [lunisolar] month' [in parts of Southern China].)

In Chinese culture, the fifteenth day of the seventh month in the traditional Chinese calendar is called Ghost Day or (especially in Taiwan) Pudu (Chinese: 普渡; pinyin: Pǔdù; Pe̍h-ōe-jī: Phó͘-tō͘) and the seventh month is generally regarded as the Ghost Month, in which ghosts and spirits, including those of deceased ancestors, come out from the lower realm (Diyu or Preta). Distinct from both the Qingming Festival (or Tomb Sweeping Day, in spring) and Double Ninth Festival (in autumn) in which living descendants pay homage to their deceased ancestors, during Ghost Festival, the deceased are believed to visit the living.

On the fifteenth day the realms of Heaven and Hell and the realm of the living are open, and both Taoists and Buddhists would perform rituals to transmute and absolve the sufferings of the deceased. Intrinsic to the Ghost Month is veneration of the dead, where traditionally the filial piety of descendants extends to their ancestors even after their deaths. Activities during the month would include preparing ritualistic food offerings, burning incense containing Styrax benzoin, and burning joss paper, a papier-mâché form of material items such as clothes, gold, and other fine goods for the visiting spirits of the ancestors. Elaborate meals (often vegetarian) would be served with empty seats for each of the deceased in the family, treating the deceased as if they are still living. Ancestor worship is what distinguishes Qingming Festival from Ghost Festival, because the latter includes paying respects to all deceased, including the same and younger generations, while the former only includes older generations. Other festivities may include buying and releasing miniature paper boats and lanterns on water, which signifies giving directions to the lost ghosts and spirits of the ancestors and other deities.

== Origins ==
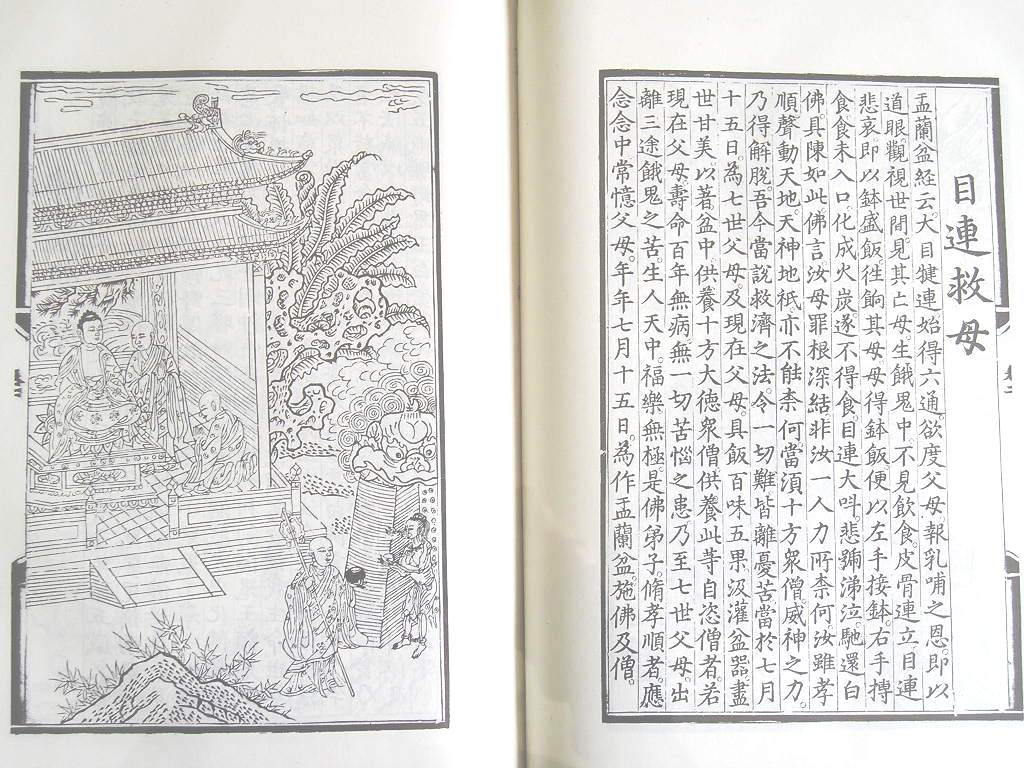
A Chinese wood cut of Mulian asking the Buddha to save his mother, who has turned into a hungry ghost from hell.

The name relates to the concept of the hungry ghost, the Chinese translation of the term preta in Buddhism. It plays a role in Chinese Buddhism and Taoism as well as in Chinese folk religion, and represents beings who were originally living people, who have died, and who are driven by intense emotional needs in an animalistic way.

As a Taoist festival: Taoism has the "Three Yuan" theory (representing the Three Great Emperor-Officials), which the name "Zhong Yuan" comes from. The festival flourished during the Tang dynasty, whose rulers were partial to Taoism; and "Zhongyuan" became well established as the holiday's name.

As a Buddhist festival: The origin story of the modern Ghost Festival, ultimately originated from ancient India, deriving from the Mahayana scripture known as the Yulanpen or Ullambana Sutra. (Note: Karashima: On p. 302 'Although this sutra has often been regarded as apocryphal [Japanese version has in recent times], the contents and ideas in it are well rooted in India as we have seen above. In addition to that, the vocabulary and usage of Chinese words are more archaic, compared with Kumārajīva's corpus (401–413 CE), while they resemble greatly the translations by Dharmarakṣa (fl. 265?–311 CE). Moreover, the transliteration 鉢和羅 (EH pat γwa la > MC pwât γwâ lâ} of Skt. pravāra (ṇā), which only occurs in this sutra and its adaptation, i.e. the Baoen Fengpen jing 報恩奉盆經 (T. 16, no. 686, 780a20), indicates clearly that this sutra is not apocryphal but a genuine translation, because only somebody who knew the original Indian form was able to transliterate it thus correctly into Chinese. In conclusion, I assume that [<-preceding 3 words missing in Japanese version] this sutra is not apocryphal, but a translation from an Indian text translated by Dharmarakṣa or somebody else in pre-Kumārajīva times [Japanese version has 3rd to 4th century CE]. [c.f. p 189 for equivalent in Japanese version] c.f. p 301 for derivation of Yulan from Middle Indic (Gandhari) *olana.) The sutra records the time when Maudgalyāyana achieves abhijñā and uses his newfound powers to search for his deceased parents. Maudgalyayana discovers that his deceased mother was reborn into the preta or hungry ghost realm. She was in a wasted condition and Maudgalyayana tried to help her by giving her a bowl of rice. Unfortunately as a preta, she was unable to eat the rice as it was transformed into burning coal. Maudgalyayana then asks the Buddha to help him; whereupon Buddha explains how one is able to assist one's current parents and deceased parents in this life and in one's past seven lives by willingly offering food, etc., to the sangha or monastic community during Pravarana (the end of the monsoon season or vassa), which usually occurs on the 15th day of the seventh month whereby the monastic community transfers the merits to the deceased parents, etc., (Note: Karashima: '東アジアの盂蘭盆と東南アジアのワン・オ一クパンサーなどは、いずれも、釈尊の時代に規定された様に七月十五日の自恣の日を祝っているのだが（日本ではこのことはすでに意識されていない）、東南アジアでは古代インドの暦に基づいて行われるのに対し、東アジアでは、中国の太陰暦に従っているので、ニケ月の差があり、これらが同一の行事ということに気付く人は少ない。' English Translation: 'Both the East Asian Urabon [Yulanpen] and Southeast Asian Wan Ok Phansa [Thai name for Pravāraṇā] are celebrated on the 15th day of the seventh month, the day of Pravāraṇā just as it was promulgated in Lord Buddha's time (in Japan, this matter is not known to people). In Southeast Asian countries, they use the ancient Indian calendar [or Buddhist calendar] as opposed to East Asian countries where they use the Chinese calendar. As there is a two month difference between the two calendars, few people realized that the two are [in fact] the same event.') (Note: Karashima: Pravāraṇā (Pāli Pavāraṇā) zizi 自恣 and suiyi 隨意 in Chinese, is a ceremony held at the end of the three-month rainy season retreat [also called vassa] by Buddhist monks. In Theravada Buddhism and in Nepal, it was and is still held on the full moon day of the seventh or eight month. i.e. Āśvina (September–October) or Kārttika (October–November) respectively.) (Note: Karashima: '對佛教徒來說，自古印度年曆（元旦相當於公曆三月中至四月中）四月十五日（公曆六至七月）或五月十五日（公曆七至八月）開始的三個月是雨安居。直至今天，西藏、尼泊爾、東南亞地區的僧人依然在此期間行雨安居。這一習俗也傳到沒有雨季的中國大陸中原地域，年曆和數字被原封不動地保留下來，但由印度年曆變為中國太陰曆。在中國、日本、朝鮮半島等東亞地區，雨安居從陰曆四月（公曆五月）開始，持續三個月。' English Translation: 'From the Buddhist viewpoint, based on the Ancient Indian calendar [or Buddhist calendar] (New Years is in the middle of March to the middle of April [in the Gregorian calendar]) the 15th day of the fourth month [Āṣāḍha] (June to July [in the Gregorian calendar]) or the 15th day of the fifth month [Śrāvaṇa] (July to August [in Gregorian calendar]) is the start of three month period called vassa. From ancient times to even today, the monastic community of Tibet, Nepal and Southeast Asia still follow this schedule to observe vassa. This custom was also transmitted to China which does not have a rainy season, the calendar and dates preserved unchanged from the original but instead of using the ancient Indian calendar, the lunisolar Chinese calendar is used. In China, Japan, the Korean peninsula and other East Asian regions, vassa starts on the fourth month of the lunisolar Chinese calendar (May (in the Gregorian calendar) and lasts 3 months.' [n.b. Since the start of vassa is fixed in East Asia in the fourth month, Pravāraṇā is also fixed to the 15th day of the seventh month].)

The Theravadan forms of the festival in South and Southeast Asia (including Cambodia's Pchum Ben) are much older, deriving from the Petavatthu, a scripture in the Pali Canon that probably dates to the 3rd century BC. The Petavatthu account is broadly similar to that later recorded in the Yulanpen Sutra, although it concerns the disciple Sāriputta and his family rather than Moggallāna.

== Observance ==
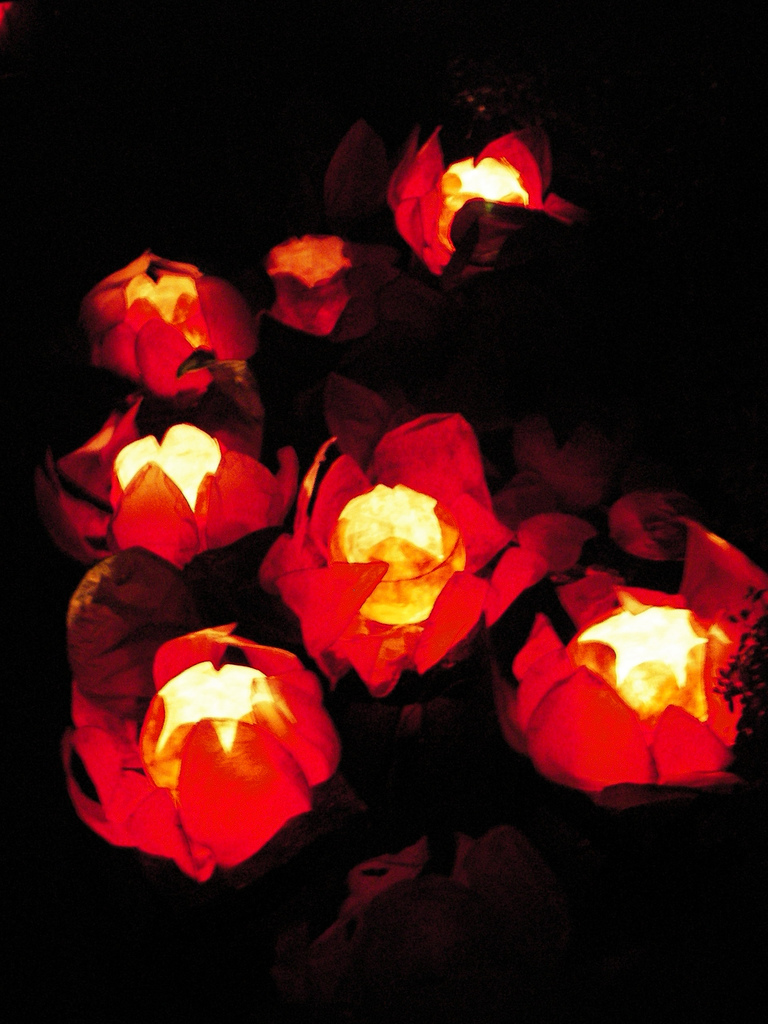
Chinese lotus lanterns floating in a river.

The Ghost Festival is held during the seventh month of the Chinese calendar. It also falls at the same time as a full moon, the new season, the fall harvest, the peak of Buddhist monastic asceticism, the rebirth of ancestors, and the assembly of the local community. During this month, the gates of hell are opened up and ghosts are free to roam the earth where they seek food and entertainment. These ghosts are believed to be spirits of those without descendants (or, traditionally, without descendants in the male lineage) or whose descendants did not pay tribute to them after they died. They are desperately hungry, thirsty, and restless as a result. Family members offer food and drink to the ghosts and burn hell bank notes and other forms of joss paper. Joss paper items are believed to have value in the afterlife, considered to be very similar in some aspects to the material world. Families pay tribute to wandering ghosts of strangers so that these homeless souls do not intrude on their lives and bring misfortune. A large feast is held for the ghosts on the day of the ghost festival or thereabouts, when people bring samples of food and place them on an altar or outside a temple or house, to please the ghosts and ward off bad luck. Lotus-shaped lanterns are lit and set afloat in rivers to symbolically guide lost souls to the afterlife.

In some East Asian countries today, live performances are held and everyone is invited to attend. The first row of seats are always empty as this is where the ghosts sit. The shows are always put on at night and at high volumes as the sound is believed to attract and please the ghosts. Some shows include Chinese opera, dramas, and in some areas, even burlesque shows. Traditionally Chinese opera was the main source of entertainment but the newer shows, concerts, dramas, wars, and so forth are referred to as Getai. These acts are better known as "Merry-making".

For rituals, Chinese Buddhists and Taoists hold ceremonies to relieve ghosts from suffering, many of them holding ceremonies in the afternoon or at night (as it is believed that the ghosts are released from hell when the sun sets). Altars are built for the deceased and priests and monks alike perform rituals for the benefit of ghosts. Monks and priests often throw rice or other small foods into the air in all directions to distribute them to the ghosts. An example of such a ritual is the Chinese Buddhist Yujia Yankou rite, which is performed to facilitate the physical and spiritual nourishment of all sentient beings in saṃsāra, including the hungry ghosts.

During the evening, incense is burnt in front of the doors of households. Incense stands for prosperity in Chinese culture, so families believe that there is more prosperity in burning more incense. During the festival, some shops are closed as they want to leave the streets open for the ghosts. In the middle of each street stands an altar of incense with fresh fruit and sacrifices displayed on it.

Fourteen days after the festival, to make sure all the hungry ghosts find their way back to hell, people float water lanterns and set them outside their houses. These lanterns are made by setting a lotus flower-shaped lantern on a paper boat. The lanterns are used to direct the ghosts back to the underworld, and when they go out, it symbolizes that they have found their way back.

== Celebrations in other parts of Asia ==
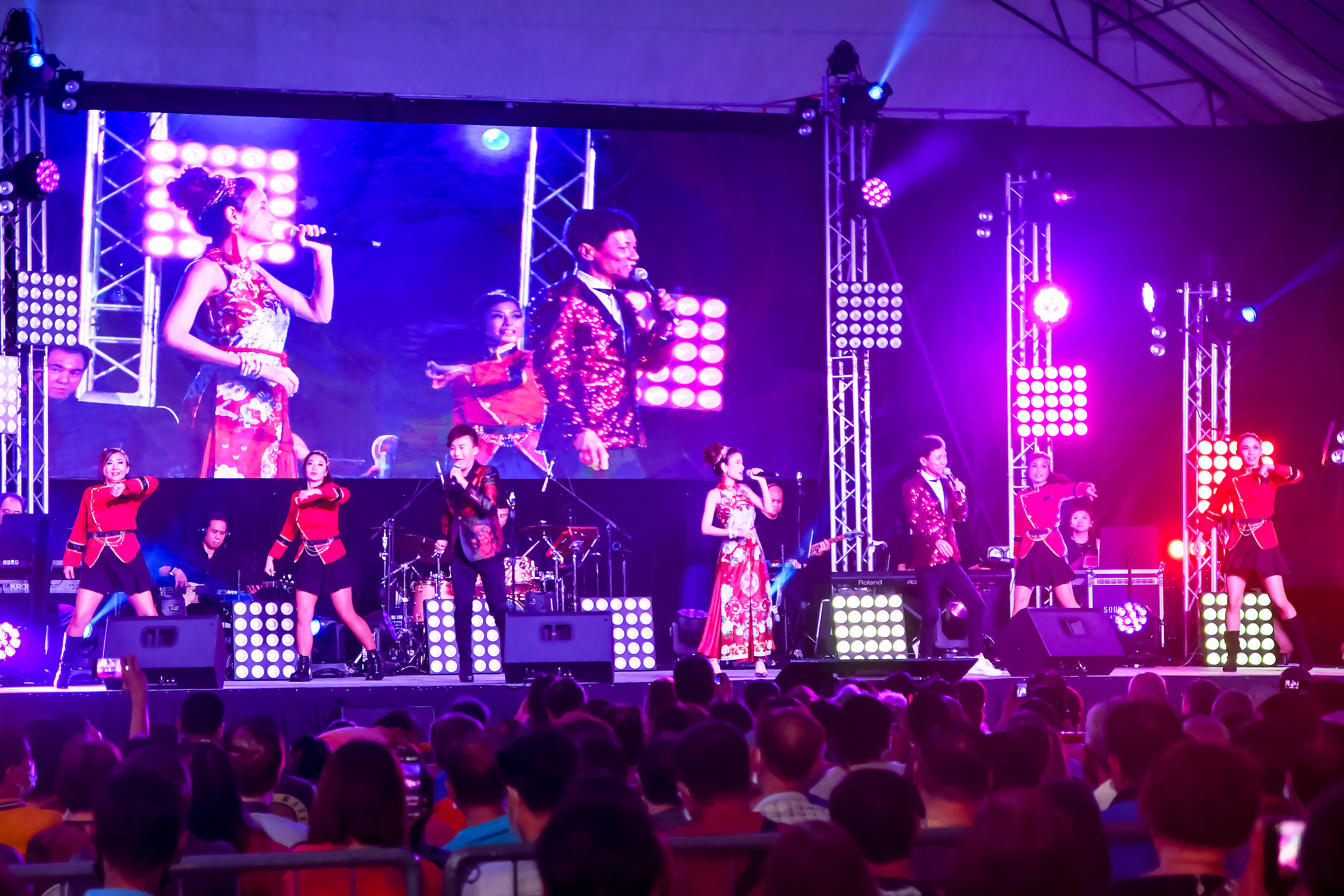
A Getai Performance in Singapore.

=== Singapore and Malaysia ===
During the 1800s to 1980s in Singapore, temples and various organisations would hire opera troupes to perform street opera for the wandering ghosts and residents alike. Malaysian Chinese would also celebrate the festival with street opera. With the decline of street opera in both Singapore and Malaysia, modern concert-like performances became a prominent feature of the Ghost Festival. Those live concerts are popularly known as Getai in Mandarin (simplified Chinese: 歌台; traditional Chinese: 歌臺; pinyin: gētái) or Koh-tai (Hokkien Chinese: 歌臺; Pe̍h-ōe-jī: ko-tâi) meaning song stages. They are performed by groups of singers, dancers, entertainers, and opera troops or puppet shows on a temporary stage that is set up within a residential district. The festival is usually funded by the temples or organisations of each individual district. During these Getai the front row is left empty for the special guests—the ghosts. It is known to be bad luck to sit on the front row of red seats, if anyone were to sit on them, they would become sick or similarly ailed.

=== Indonesia ===
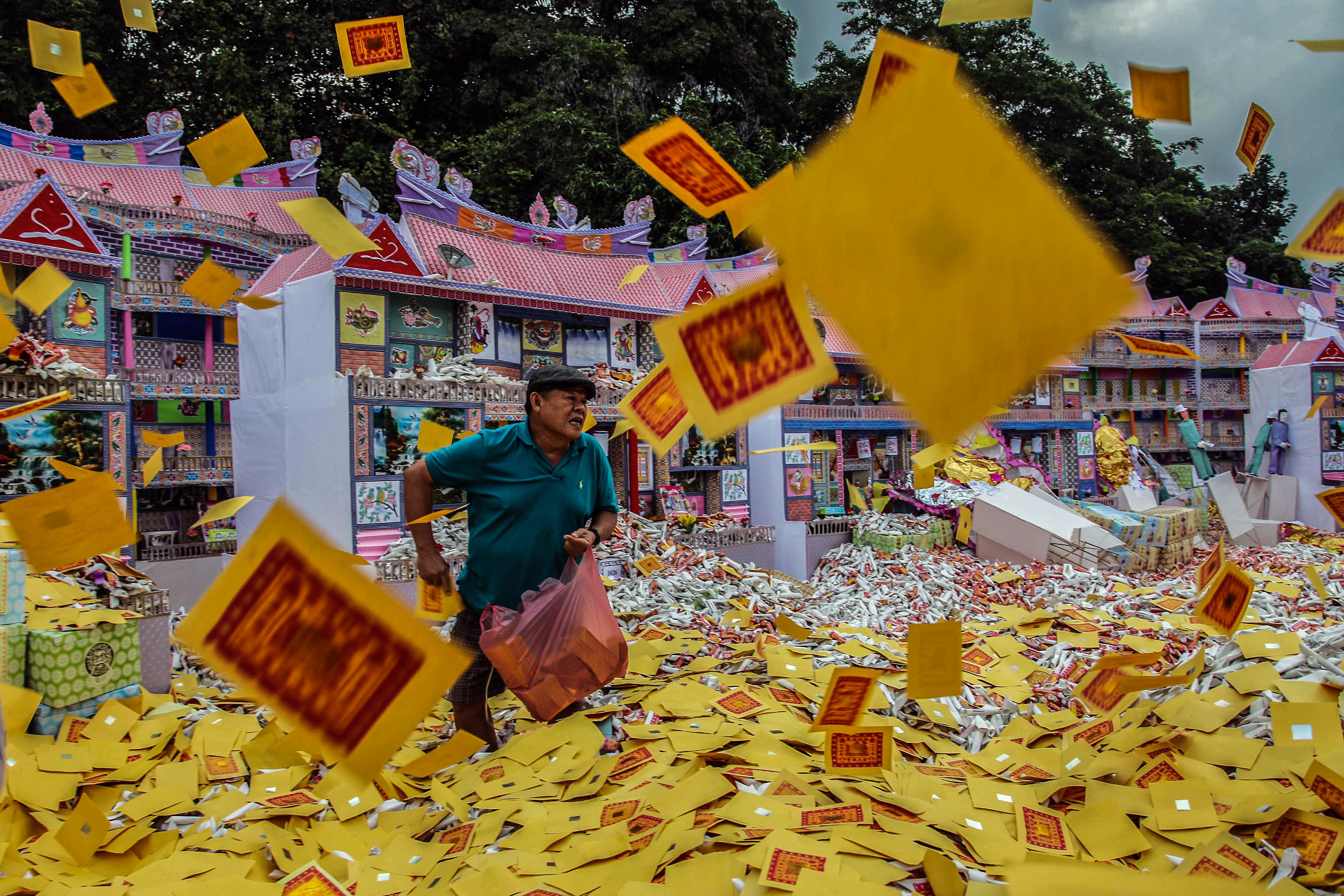
A man throws the Hell notes during Hungry Ghost Festival in Vihara Gunung Timur, Medan, Indonesia.

In Indonesia, the festival is popularly known as Chit Gwee Pua (Hokkien Chinese: 七月半; Pe̍h-ōe-jī: Chhit-goe̍h-pòaⁿ) or Chit Nyiat Pan (Hakka Chinese: 七月半; Pha̍k-fa-sṳ:Chhit-ngie̍t-pan), Cioko, or Sembahyang Rebutan in Indonesian (Scrambling prayer). Observers gather around temples and bring an offering to a spirit who died in an unlucky way, and after that, they distribute it to the poor. The way people scramble the offerings is the origin of the festival name, and the festival is mostly known in Java Island. Other areas like North Sumatra, Riau, and Riau islands also conduct live concerts known as Getai (Mandarin simplified Chinese: 歌台; traditional Chinese: 歌臺; pinyin: gētái) like those in Malaysia and Singapore, and there are also times when observers conduct Tomb sweeping known as Sembahyang Kubur to respect ancestor spirits and garner luck. This is done by buying hell notes or Kim Cua (Hokkien Chinese: 金紙; Pe̍h-ōe-jī: kim-chóa) and paper-based goods like paper house, paper horse, paper car, etc., which will end up being burned as it is believed that burned goods will be sent to help the spirits feel better in afterlife.

=== Philippines ===
In the Philippines, the occasion is more popularly known as Ghost Month, as it affects the entire seventh lunisolar month of the Chinese calendar around August to September (which coincided with the months of the Immaculate Heart of Mary and the Feast of Our Lady of Sorrows respectively). The month-long observances are mostly traditionally practiced and originated by Chinese Filipinos which its observance has since spread to other Filipinos that have become aware of it, since it reverberates economically through the stock market as a sizable amount of investors stop investing and put off their investments for later dates past the occasion.

Generally, those who observe it find it to be a very unlucky time of the year, as traditional belief states that the souls of dead relatives, wandering souls or vengeful spirits roam the earth during the month-long occasion. This means that practitioners take extra precautions and caution others of making important decisions when it comes to relationships, professions, businesses, and finances. People avoid practices like:

- Making life-changing decisions;
- Getting married or engaged;
- Starting new businesses;
- Moving to a new home;
- Traveling;
- Signing contracts;
- Making impulsive major financial decisions;
- Committing to big professional projects;
- Inaugurations;
- Buying or selling off high priced possessions, such as cars, phones, or real estate properties;
- Staying late out at night, especially kids and elderlies;
- Making noise or whistling at night;
- Leaving food or hanging clothes out after sunset and leaving them overnight, since their human-like shape may invite spirits;
- Taking pictures at night;
- Wearing black clothes;
- Tapping people on the head or shoulders, as it may affect their luck;
- Picking up coins or strange items one finds, since these may belong to the dead;
- Constantly talking to oneself;
- Going to cemeteries alone;
- Answering unknown whispers or sobbing;
- Being constantly close to bodies of water; or
- Constantly talking about ghosts or death.

Besides these many avoidances, practitioners also make offerings and prayers for the souls of the dead, such as burning spirit money, lighting incense, and laying out food like fruits and drinks on home or temple altars or cemetery tombs or graves or mausoleums of deceased relatives that people during this month also start to visit. Some people also start to hold memorial services to deceased relatives or ancestors held either at home or at a Chinese temple or funeral home.

Due to occasion being held around the months of the Immaculate Heart of Mary, the Feast of Our Lady of Sorrows and many feast days in the months of August to September, many Filipino Catholics and other Christians had tend to focus on the devotion of the Jesus, Virgin Mary and many other patron saints at home or at a church instead as a result of responsas by Catholic and Christian authorities. Filipino also offered masses for the souls of dead relatives, wandering souls or vengeful spirits. Filipinos even rename the occasion from "Ghost Month" to "Holy Ghost Month" and the climax for the occasion is Undas (All Saints' Day and All Souls' Day) and the climax is meant to represent the opening of the gates of heaven for the spirits.

=== Taiwan ===
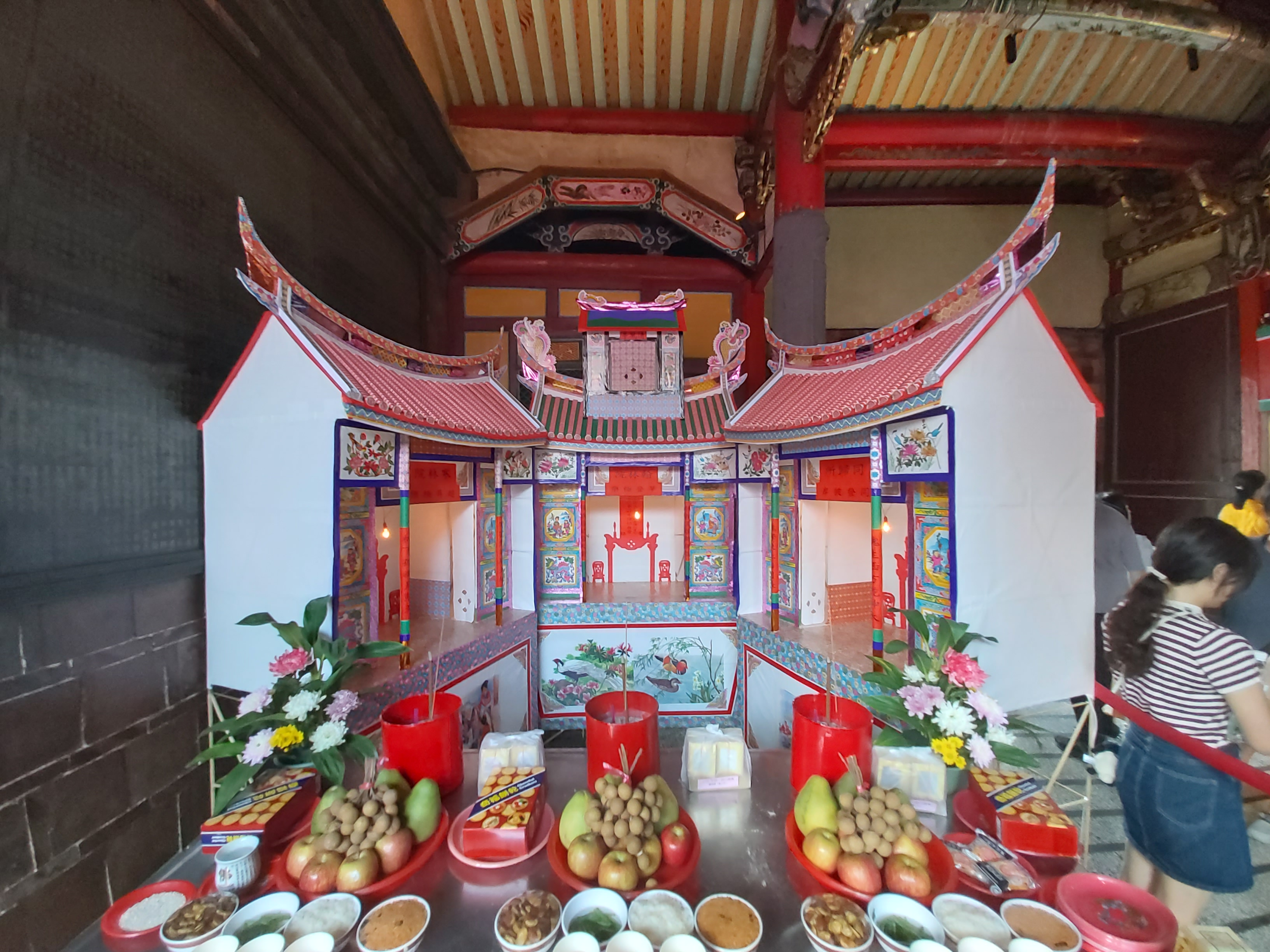
The Ghost Festival being celebrated in the Bangka Lungshan Temple in Taiwan.

Traditionally, it is believed that ghosts haunt the island of Taiwan for the entire seventh lunisolar month, when the mid-summer Ghost Festival is held. The month is known as Ghost Month. The first day of the month is marked by opening the gate of a temple, symbolizing the gates of hell. On the twelfth day, lamps on the main altar are lit. On the thirteenth day, a procession of lanterns is held. On the fourteenth day, a parade is held for releasing water lanterns. Incense and food are offered to the spirits to deter them from visiting homes and spirit paper money is also burnt as an offering. During the month, people avoid surgery, buying cars, swimming, moving house, marrying, whistling, and going out or taking pictures after dark.

=== Vietnam ===
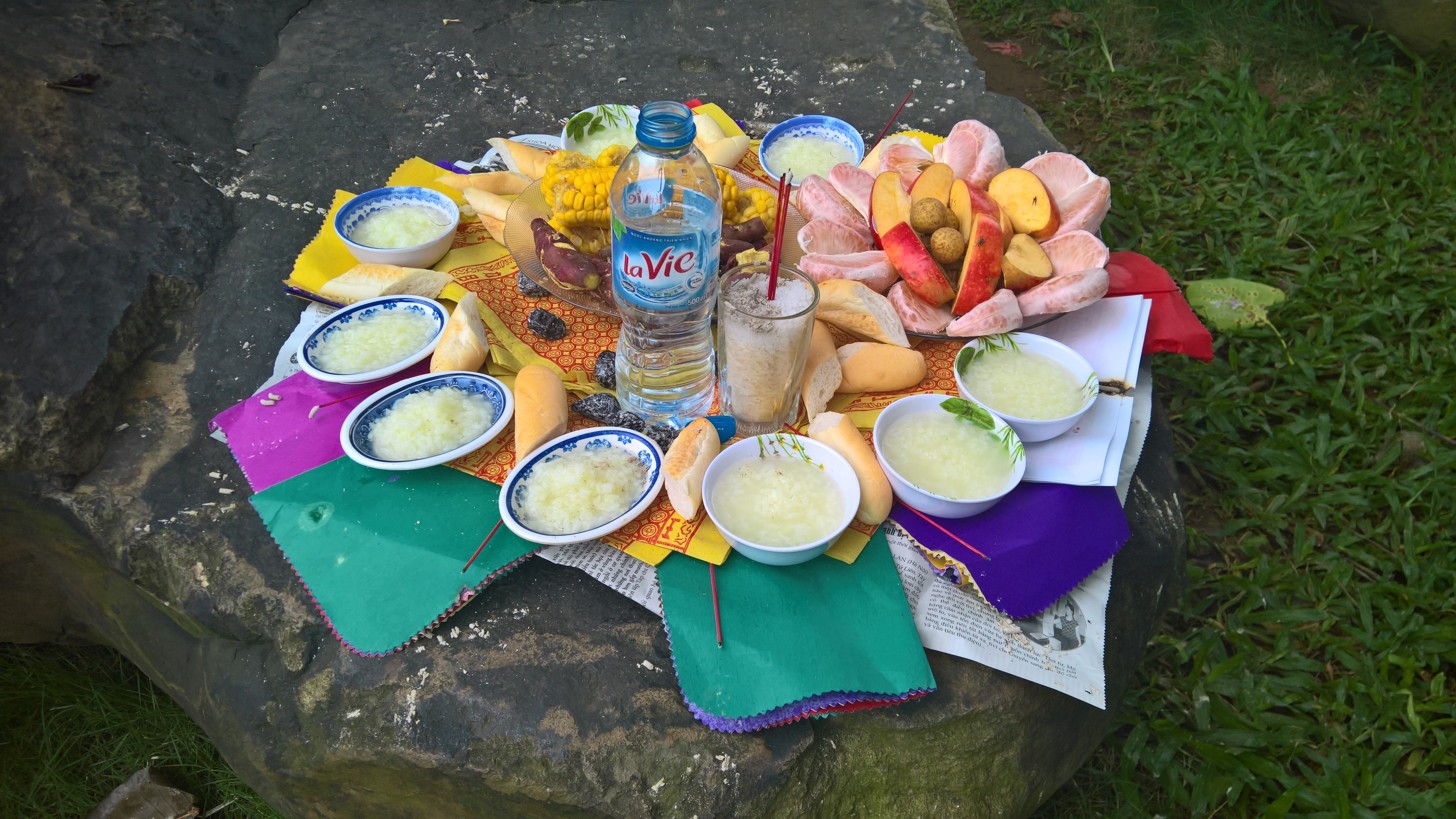
Various food items being offered for the wandering souls in Tháng Cô Hồn.

This festival is known as Tết Trung Nguyên and is viewed as a time for the pardoning of condemned souls who are released from hell. The "homeless" should be "fed" and appeased with offerings of food. Merits for the living are also earned by the release of birds and fish. The lunisolar month in which the festival takes place is colloquially known as Tháng Cô Hồn – the month of lonely spirits, and believed to be haunted and particularly unlucky.

Influenced by Buddhism, this holiday coincides with Vu Lan, the Vietnamese transliteration for Ullambana.

In modern times, Vu Lan is also seen as Parents' Day. People with living parents would bear a red rose and would give thanks while those without can choose to bear a white rose; and attend services to pray for the deceased.

== Related traditions ==
=== Buddhist traditions ===
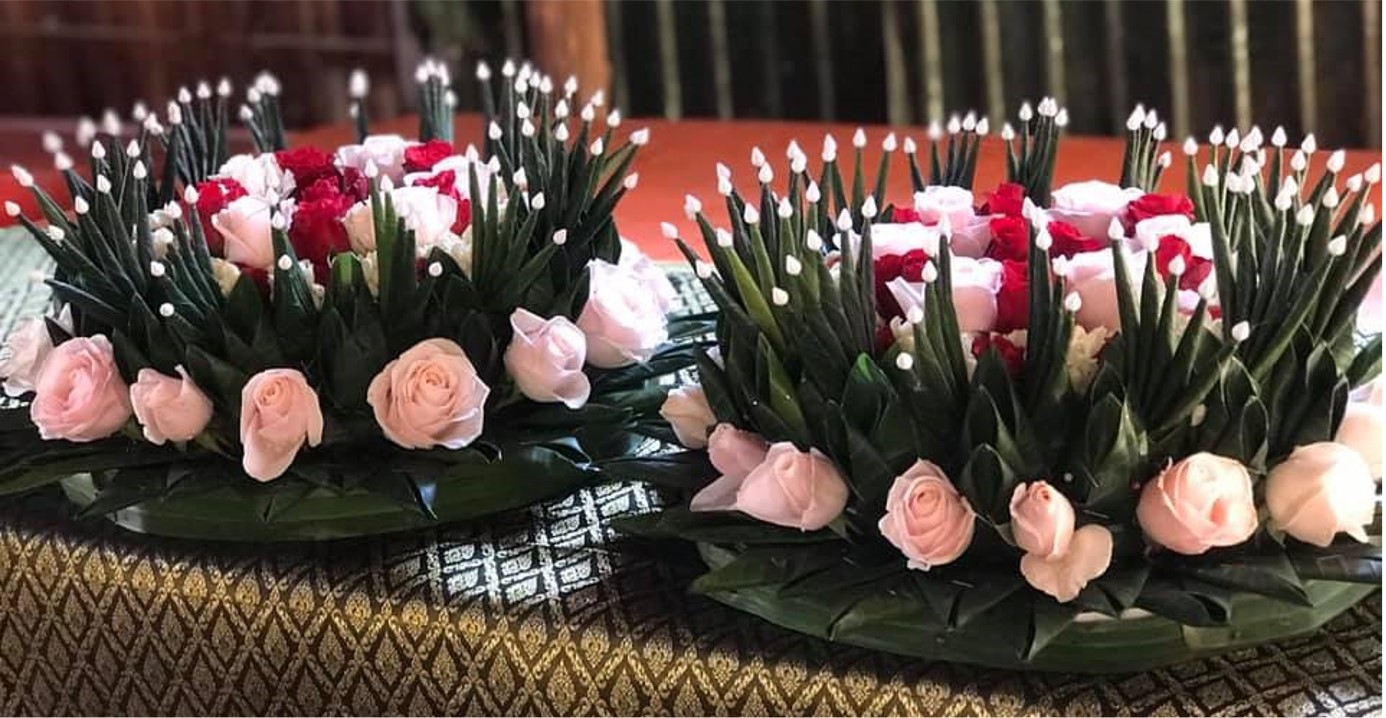
A kantong (container made from leaves with flowers and offering) for floating on water during Pchum Ben Day in Cambodia.

In Asian Theravadin Buddhist countries, related traditions, ceremonies, and festivals also occur. Like its Ullambana Sutra-origins in Mahayana Buddhist countries, the Theravada scripture, the Petavatthu gave rise to the idea of offering food to the hungry ghosts in the Theravada tradition as a form of merit-making. In stories published in the Petavatthu Maudgalyayana, who also plays the central role in the rise of the concept in the Mahayana tradition, along with Sariputta also play a role in the rise of the concept in the Theravada tradition. Similarly to the rise of the concept in Mahayana Buddhism, a version of Maudgalyayana Rescues His Mother, where Maudgalyayana is replaced by Sariputta is recorded in the Petavatthu and is in part the basis behind the practice of the concept in Theravadin societies. The concept of offering food to the hungry ghosts is also found in early Buddhist literature, in the Tirokudda Kanda.

==== Cambodia ====
In Cambodia, a fifteen-day-long annual festival known as Pchum Ben occurs generally in September or October. Cambodians pay their respects to deceased relatives up to seven generations. The gates of hell are believed to open during this period and many people make offerings to these hungry ghosts.

==== Laos ====
In Laos, a festival known as, Boun khao padap din usually occurs in September each year and goes on for two weeks. During this period, it is believed that hungry ghosts are freed from hell and enter the world of the living. A second festival known as Boun khao salak occurs directly after the conclusion of Boun khay padab din. During this period, food offerings are made to the hungry ghosts.

==== Sri Lanka ====
In Sri Lanka, food offerings are made to Buddhist monks as a way for indirectly offering them to their relatives who might have been born as a hungry ghost. This is typically offered on the seventh day, three months and one year after the death day of a deceased person. It is a ceremony conducted after death as part of traditional Sri Lankan Buddhist funeral rites and is known as mataka dānēs or matakadānaya. The offerings that are made acquire merit which are then transformed back into the equivalent goods in the world of the hungry ghosts. The offering that is offered on the seventh day, comes a day after personalized food offerings are given in the garden to the spirit of the deceased relative, which occurs on the sixth day. The deceased who do not reach the proper afterworld, the Hungry Ghost realm, are feared by the living as they are believed to cause various sicknesses and disasters to the living. Buddhist monks are called upon to perform pirit to ward off the floating spirits. The rite is also practiced in Thailand and Myanmar and is also practiced during the Ghost Festival that is observed in other Asian countries.

==== Thailand ====
In Thailand, a fifteen-day-long annual festival known as Sat Thai is celebrated between September and October in Thailand especially in southern Thailand, particularly in the province of Nakhon Si Thammarat. Like related festivals and traditions in other parts of Asia, the deceased are believed to come back to earth for fifteen days and people make offerings to them. The festival is known as Sat Thai to differentiate it from the Chinese Ghost Festival which is known as Sat Chin in the Thai language.

==== Japan ====
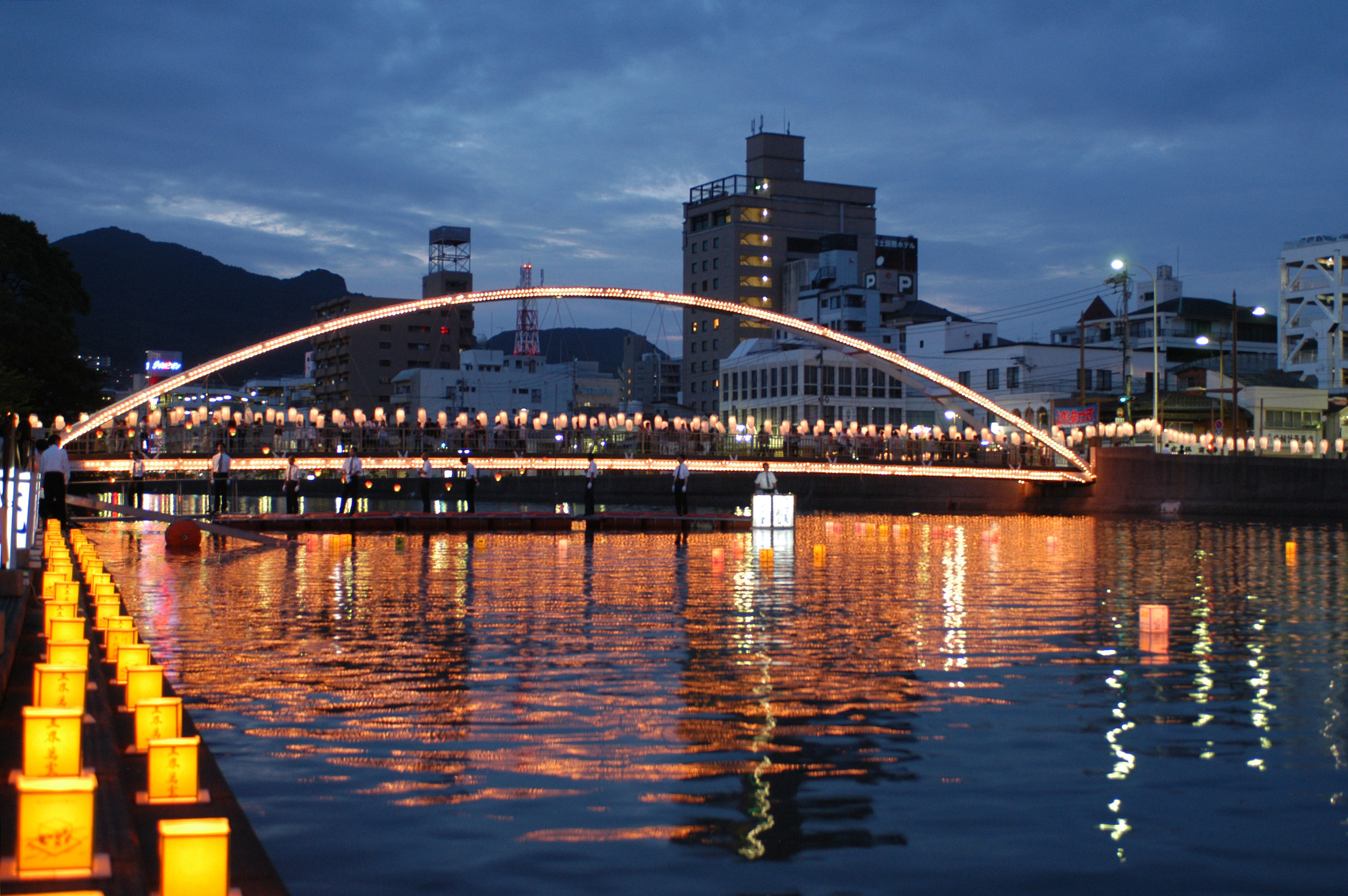
Japanese volunteers perform tōrō nagashi: placing candle-lit lanterns for the dead into flowing water during Obon, in this case into the Sasebo River.

===== Chūgen =====
Chūgen (中元), also Ochūgen (お中元), is an annual event in Japan on the 15th day of the 7th month, when people give gifts, especially to their superiors. Originally it was an annual event for giving gifts to the ancestral spirits.

One of the three days that form the sangen (三元) of Daoism, it is sometimes considered a zassetsu, a type of seasonal day in the Japanese calendar.

===== Bon =====
Obon (sometimes transliterated O-bon), or simply Bon, is the Japanese version of the Ghost Festival. It has since been transformed over time into a family reunion holiday during which people from the big cities return to their home towns and visit and clean the resting places of their ancestors.

Traditionally including a dance called Bon Odori, Obon has existed in Japan for more than 500 years. In modern Japan, it is held on July 15 in the eastern part (Kantō) and on August 15 in the western part (Kansai).

==== Ryukyu Islands ====
In Okinawa and the Amami Islands, it is celebrated as in China, on the 15th day of the 7th lunisolar month. This festival is known as Bun/Usōrō.

=== Hindu traditions ===
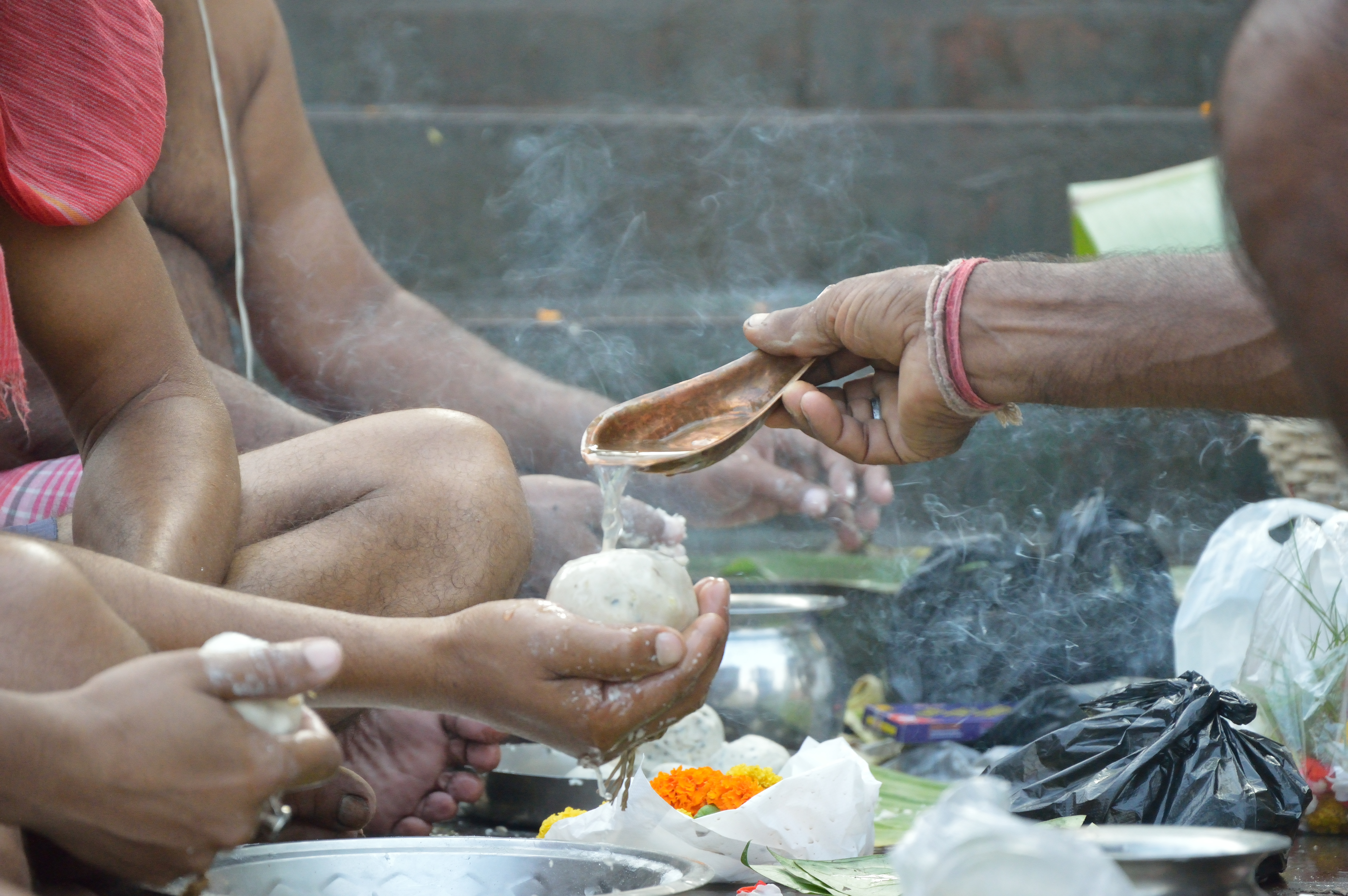
Pitri Paksha rites being performed on the banks of the Hooghly River at Jagannath Ghat in Kolkata.

==== India ====
The performance of Shraddha by a son during Pitru Paksha is regarded as compulsory by Hindus, to ensure that the soul of the ancestor goes to heaven. In this context, the scripture Garuda Purana says, "there is no salvation for a man without a son". The scriptures preach that a householder should propitiate ancestors (Pitris), along with the gods (devas), ghosts (bhutas), and guests. The scripture Markandeya Purana says that if the ancestors are content with the shraddhas, they will bestow health, wealth, knowledge and longevity, and ultimately heaven and salvation (moksha) upon the performer.

==== Indonesia ====
In Bali and some parts of Indonesia, particularly among the indigenous Hindus of Indonesia, ancestors who have died and cremated are said to return to visit their former homes. This day is known as Hari Raya Galungan and celebrations typically last over two weeks, often in the form of specific food and religious offerings along with festivities. The festival date is often calculated according to the Balinese pawukon calendar and typically occurs every 210 days.

== See also ==
- All Souls' Day
- Buddhist art
- Chinese ghosts
- Lantern Festival
- Nine Emperor God / Festival of Nine Emperor God (Chinese: 九皇, Hokkien: Kow Ong Yah, Cantonese: Kow Wong Yeh)
- Phi Ta Khon
- Tōrō nagashi
- Day of the Dead
- Samhain

== General and cited bibliography ==
- Bandō, Shōjun, ed. (2005), "The Ullambana Sutra (Taishō Vol. 16, No. 685)", Apocryphal Scriptures (PDF), Bukkyō Dendō Kyōkai English Tripitaka Series, Berkeley: Numata Center for Buddhist Translation and Research, pp. 17–44, ISBN 978-1-886439-29-0, archived from the original (PDF) on February 10, 2013.
- Chow, Shu Kai (周樹佳) (2015), 鬼月鉤沉-中元、盂蘭、餓鬼節 [Investigation of Ghost Month – Zhong Yuan, Ullambana and Hungry Ghost Festivals] (in Traditional Chinese), Hong Kong: Chung Hwa Books (Hong Kong), ISBN 9789888366392
- Langer, Rita (2007), Buddhist Rituals of Death and Rebirth: Contemporary Sri Lankan Practice and Its Origins, Abingdon: Routledge, ISBN 9781134158720.
- Karashima, Seishi (2013a), "The Meaning of Yulanpen 盂蘭盆 "Rice Bowl" On Pravāraṇā Day", Annual Report of the International Research Institute for Advance Buddhology at Soka University for the Academic Year 2012, XVI: 289–305
- Karashima, Seishi (辛嶋静志) (2013b), 「盂蘭盆」の本当の意味 ―千四百間の誤解を解く [The Real Meaning of Urabon [Yulanpen] –The Solution to a 1400 Year Misunderstanding], 大法輪 (The Great Wheel of the Dharma) (in Japanese): 182–189
- Karashima, Seishi (辛嶋静志)(in Chinese as 辛島靜志) (2014), 盂蘭盆之意-自恣日的"飯鉢" [The Meaning of Yulanpen 盂蘭盆 "Rice Bowl" On Pravāraṇā Day], 中華文史論叢 (Journal of Chinese Literature and History) (in Traditional Chinese) (114), translated by Qiu, Yun Qing (裘雲青): 279–301
- Mair, Victor H. (1989), T'ang Transformation Texts, Cambridge: Harvard University Press, ISBN 9780674868151.
- Teiser, Stephen F. (1988), The Ghost Festival in Medieval China, Princeton: Princeton University Press, ISBN 978-0-691-02677-0.
