= Sat Thai =

Festival in Thailand

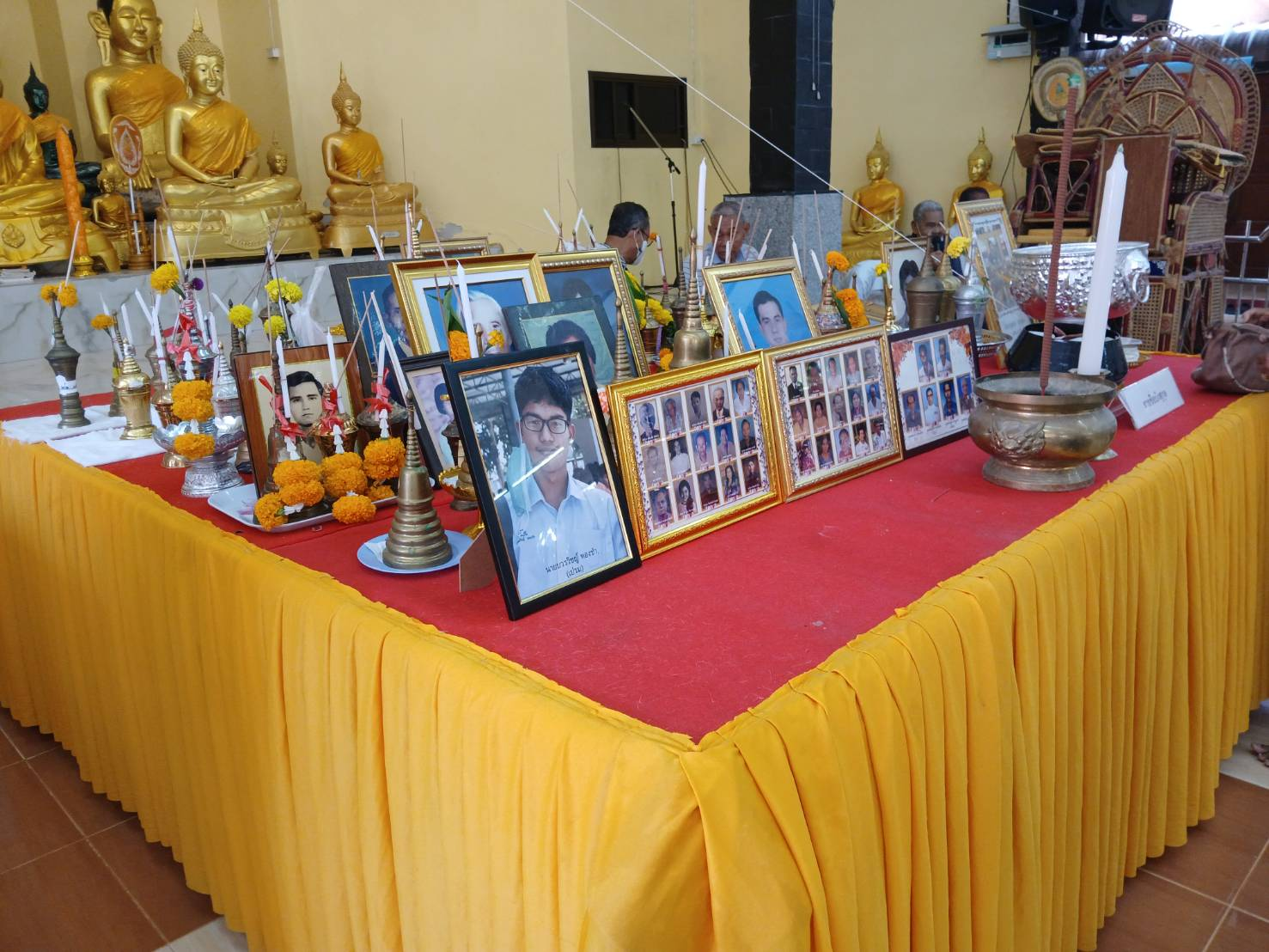
- Official name: วันสารทไทย (Wan Sat Thai)
- Observed by: Thailand, especially in Southern Thailand
- Type: Originally an animistic harvest festival, with later incorporation of Buddhist traditions
- Observances: Traditional mid-year festival; merit-making for ancestors and deceased relatives
- Date: New moon of the tenth Thai lunar month
- Related to: Pchum Ben (in Cambodia); Boun Khao Padap Din (in Laos); Mataka dānēs (in Sri Lanka); Ghost Festival (in China); Tết Trung Nguyên (in Vietnam); Obon (in Japan); Baekjung (in Korea)

Sat Thai (Thai: สารทไทย, pronounced [sàːt tʰāj]; also spelled Sart Thai) is a traditional Thai mid-year festival, held on the new moon at the end of the tenth lunar month. It has many features of animism, attributing souls or spirits to animals, plants and other entities.

== Etymology ==
Sat (ศารท or สารท (สาท), RTGS sat) comes from Pali sārada, which means 'autumnal'. It specifically refers to the season "when the grain is in the ear": rice grain panicles droop as seeds reach full size and fills with milky starch in the days before harvest time. Fruits also are in the bud. Sat Thai is known as such to differentiate it from the Ghost Festival, known in Thai as Sat Chin.

== Observance ==
Sat Thai Day occurs at the end of Thai lunar calendar Moon 10, that is, waning day 15, evening (วันแรม ๑๕ ค่ำ เดือน ๑๐). This is a New Moon and so is a Buddhist Sabbath; but not one of the Special Sabbaths, and not one of the secular public holidays in Thailand. It occurs midway past the traditional Thai New Year and near the autumnal equinox. It an occasion for making merit by honoring (บูชา buucha) the spirits of the season, as well as one's deceased relatives, according to local tradition, with various rites and ceremonies.

== Beginning of the Vegetarian Festival ==
Sat Thai Day usually corresponds with the beginning of the nine-day Vegetarian Festival, which is widely observed by Thai Chinese and some Thais. It appears on calendars as "Begin 9-day vegetarian festival" (roem thet-sa-gan kin-che 9 wan, เริ่มเทศกาลกินเจ ๙ วัน) — kin-che (กินเจ) is to vow in the manner of Vietnamese or Chinese Buddhists to eat a strict vegetarian diet.

== See also ==
- Mid-Autumn Festival
- Lughnasadh, a Celtic festival with many similar traditions
- Sat Duan Sip
