= Yulanpen Sutra =

Sutra in Mahāyāna Buddhism

- Mulian and his mother Madame Liu (19th century)
- Traditional Chinese: 《盂蘭盆經》
- Simplified Chinese: 《盂兰盆经》
- Literal meaning: Sutra of the Yulan Bowl
Transcriptions
Standard Mandarin
- Hanyu Pinyin: 《Yúlánpén jīng》
- Wade–Giles: Yü-lan-p'ên Ching

Alternative name
- Traditional Chinese: 《佛說盂蘭盆經》
- Simplified Chinese: 《佛说盂兰盆经》
- Literal meaning: Sutra of the Yulan Bowl Spoken by the Buddha
Transcriptions
Standard Mandarin
- Hanyu Pinyin: 《Fú shuō Yúlánpén jīng》
- Wade–Giles: Fo Shuo Yü-lan-p'ên Ching

The Yulanpen Sutra, also known as the Ullambana Sutra (traditional Chinese: 盂蘭盆經; ; pinyin: yúlánpén-jīng; Japanese pronunciation: urabon-kyō; Korean: 우란분경; Vietnamese: Kinh Vu Lan Bồn), is a Mahayana sutra concerning filial piety. It was translated from an Indic language (see History) and is found in Taisho 685 and Taisho 686 in Volume 16, the third volume of the Collected Sutra Section. Taisho 685 was translated by Dharmarakṣa from 265 to 311 and is entitled: 'The Buddha Speaks the Yulanpen Sutra'. Taisho 686 was translated by an unknown or lost translator during the Eastern Jin Dynasty and is entitled: 'The Buddha Speaks the Sutra of Offering Bowls to Repay Kindness'. According to Karashima, Taisho 686 is basically a more idiomatic adaptation of Taisho 685. It records the events which followed after one of the disciples of Shakyamuni Buddha, Maudgalyayana, achieves Abhijñā and uses his newfound powers to search for his deceased parents. In the end, Maudgalyayana finds his mother in the preta (hungry ghost) world and with the assistance of the Buddha, is able to save her. The East Asian Ghost Festival is based on this sutra.

== History ==
The Yulanpen Sutra has traditionally been regarded as being translated from the Sanskrit into Chinese by Dharmarakṣa under the Jin at some point between 265 and 311 CE. The subject matter of the Yulanpen Sutra is broadly similar to several accounts described in other sutras. The most ancient of those accounts (Petavatthu No. 14 - The Story of the Mother of Sariputta) describes how the disciple Sāriputta rescued his mother (from five past lives ago) who had become a preta or hungry ghost. Similar to the Yulanpen Sutra, Sariputta builds four huts and fills them with food and drink for the Sangha of the four quarters; with the Buddha present, he dedicates this donation on behalf of his suffering mother. The transference of merit enables Sariputta's mother to be reborn and released from the preta world. Another account can be found in the Avadanasataka, which is also very similar to the Yulanpen Sutra: Maudgalyayana communicates on the behalf of five hundred pretas with their relatives who make offerings on the pretas' behalf to the monastic community. Once the transference of merit is completed, the former pretas are reborn and released from their suffering.

== Contents ==
The sutra records the time when Maudgalyayana achieves abhijñā and uses his newfound powers to search for his deceased parents. Maudgalyayana discovers that his deceased mother was reborn into the preta or hungry ghost realm. She was in a wasted condition and Maudgalyayana tried to help her by giving her a bowl of rice. Unfortunately as a preta, she was unable to eat the rice as it was transformed into burning coal. Maudgalyayana then asks the Buddha to help him; whereupon Buddha explains how one is able to assist one's current parents and deceased parents in this life and in one's past seven lives by willingly offering food, etc., to the sangha or monastic community during Pravarana (the end of the monsoon season or vassa), which usually occurs on the 15th day of the seventh month whereby the monastic community transfers the merits to the deceased parents, etc..

== Legacy ==
The sutra was picked up almost immediately by Chinese festival guides like the Jingchu Suishiji and influenced the creation of the Ghost Festival in China, which in turn influenced other Ghost Festivals throughout East Asia, such as the Bon Festival in Japan.

== See also ==
- Dana (Buddhism)
- Filial piety in Buddhism
- Mulian Rescues His Mother, a Chinese legend concerning Maudgalyayana
- Petavatthu
- Transfer of merit
- Zhong Yuan Festival
