= Miryang Baekjung Festival =

Korean festival

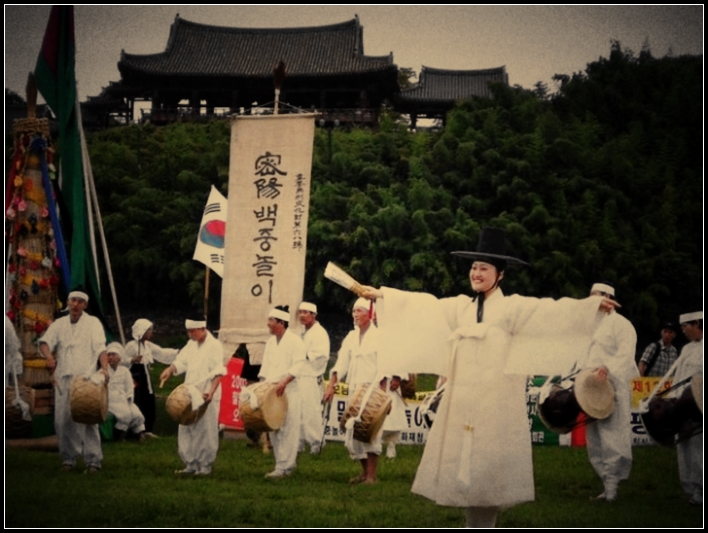
Miryang Baekjung Festival

The Miryang baekjung nori (Korean: 밀양백중놀이; Hanja: 密陽百中놀이) is a festival held in the Korean city of Miryang to celebrate the holiday of Baekjung. Whilst Baekjung is a national celebration, the specific festivities in Milyang are regarded as one of the Important Intangible Cultural Properties of Korea.

Baekjung is a Buddhist festival of the dead, originating from Zhong Yuan Jie (Ghost Festival) in China. But in Korea it also has elements of an agricultural holiday as well. It is characterised by prayers to the gods of agriculture; masked dances and "hoe-washing", a form of carnival in which the roles of landlord and labourer are reversed. Baekjung falls on the fifteenth day of the seventh month.

The festivities at Miryang begin with a shamanic ritual of supplication to the agricultural deities by the village elders, to purify the area and ensure a bounteous harvest in the coming autumn. This is accompanied by vigorous drum music (nong-ak). A pole called a nongshindae, similar to a maypole, is raised, and the participants circle it and offer prayers. The food and drink offerings are then shared among the celebrants, and a number of traditional dances are performed, including the Dance of the Aristocrat (Hallyangmu) and the Dance of the Cripple (Pyongshinchum). These dances tend to be comical satires of their subject, and often include improvisation and impersonation. Other activities also take place, including the gejuldarigi or "spider tug-of-war", which is unique to Miryang.

The festival closes with a performance of the Five Drums Dance (Obuk-chum), a traditional farmers dance which is also a prayer for good health and a good harvest.
