= Filial piety =

Virtue and practice in Chinese classics and society at large

Filial piety 孝
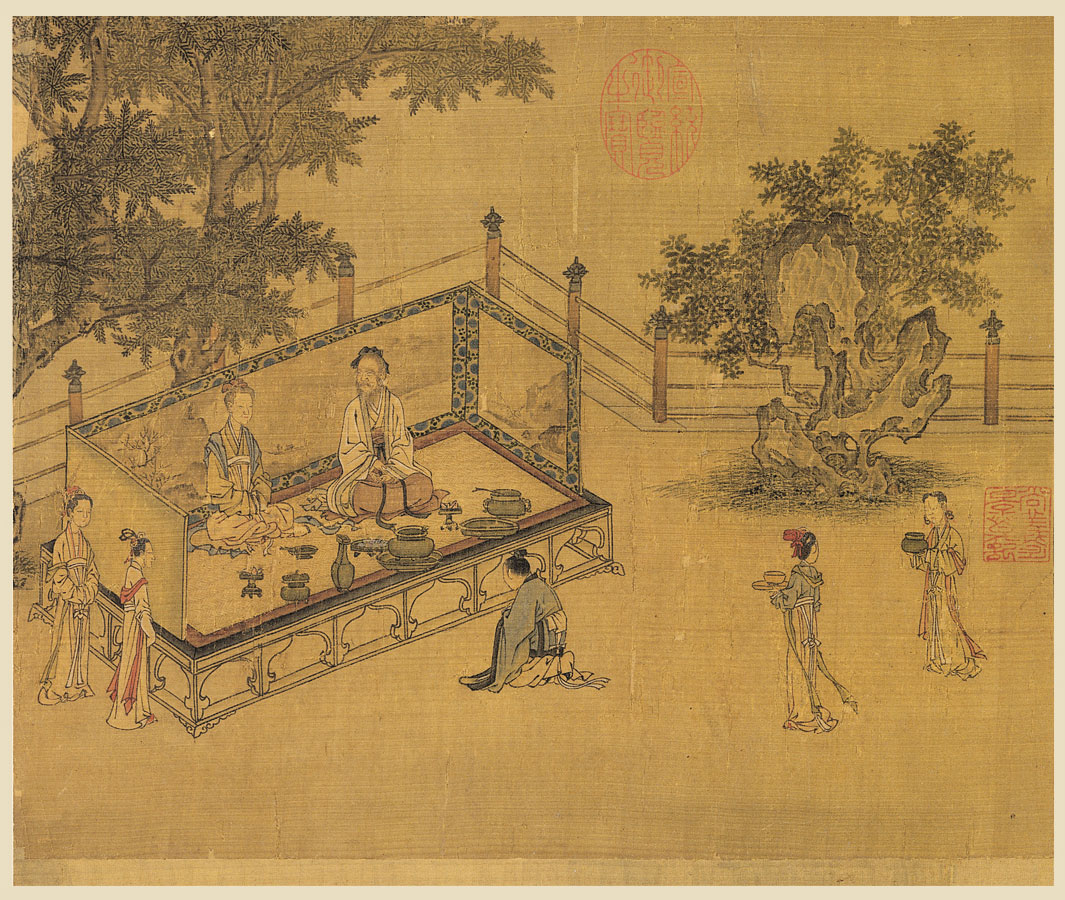
- Scene from Illustrations of the Classic of Filial Piety (detail), depicting a son kneeling before his parents

Chinese name
- Chinese: 孝
Transcriptions
Standard Mandarin
- Hanyu Pinyin: xiào
- Bopomofo: ㄒㄧㄠˋ
- Wade–Giles: hsiao^{4}
- Tongyong Pinyin: siào
- IPA: [ɕjâʊ]
Hakka
- Romanization: haau4
Yue: Cantonese
- Yale Romanization: haau
- Jyutping: haau3
- IPA: [haw˧]
Southern Min
- Hokkien POJ: hàu
Middle Chinese
- Middle Chinese: xaewH
Old Chinese
- Baxter–Sagart (2014): *qʰˤ<r>uʔ-s

Vietnamese name
- Vietnamese alphabet: hiếu
- Chữ Hán: 孝

Korean name
- Hangul: 효
- Hanja: 孝
Transcriptions
- Revised Romanization: hyo
- McCune–Reischauer: hyo

Mongolian name
- Mongolian Cyrillic: элбэрэл, тахимдуу
- Mongolian script: ᠡᠯᠪᠡᠷᠢᠯ᠂ ᠲᠠᠬᠢᠮᠳᠠᠭᠣ
Transcriptions
- SASM/GNC: elberil, takimtaɣu

Japanese name
- Kanji: 孝
- Hiragana: こう
Transcriptions
- Revised Hepburn: Kō
- Kunrei-shiki: Kô

Manchu name
- Manchu script: ᡥᡳᠶᠣᠣᡧᡠᠨ
- Möllendorff: hiyoošun

Filial piety is the virtue of exhibiting love and respect for one's parents, elders, and ancestors within the context of Confucian, Chinese Buddhist, and Daoist ethics. The Confucian Classic of Filial Piety, thought to be written around the late Warring States-Qin-Han period, has historically been the authoritative source on the Confucian tenet of filial piety. The book—a purported dialogue between Confucius and his student Zengzi—is about how to set up a good society using the principle of filial piety. Filial piety is central to Confucian role ethics.

In more general terms, filial piety means to be good to one's parents; to take care of one's parents; to engage in good conduct, not just towards parents but also outside the home so as to bring a good name to one's parents and ancestors; to show love, respect, and support; to display courtesy; to ensure male heirs; to uphold fraternity among brothers; to wisely advise one's parents, including dissuading them from moral unrighteousness; to display sorrow for their sickness and death; and to bury them and carry out sacrifices after their death.

Filial piety is considered a key virtue in Chinese and other East Asian cultures, and it is the main subject of many stories. One of the most famous collections of such stories is The Twenty-four Cases of Filial Piety. These stories depict how children exercised their filial piety customs in the past. While China has always had a diversity of religious beliefs, the custom of filial piety has been common to almost all of them; historian Hugh D.R. Baker calls respect for the family the one element common to almost all Chinese people.

== Terminology ==
The western term filial piety was originally derived from studies of Western societies, based on Mediterranean cultures. However, filial piety among the ancient Romans, for example, was largely different from the Chinese in its logic and enactment. Filial piety is illustrated by the Chinese character xiao (孝). The character is a combination of the character lao (old) above the character zi (son), i.e. an elder being carried by a son. This indicates that the older generation should be supported by the younger generation.

In Korean Confucianism, the character 孝 is pronounced hyo (효). In Vietnamese, the character 孝 is written in the Vietnamese alphabet as hiếu. In Japanese, the term is generally rendered in spoken and written language as 親孝行 (oyakōkō) adding the characters for parent and conduct to the Chinese character to make the word more specific.

The Manchu rendering of the term is hiyoošun (ᡥᡳᠶᠣᠣᡧᡠᠨ) from xiaoshun (孝順), while it was translated as elberil (ᠡᠯᠪᠡᠷᠢᠯ) in Classical Mongolian and takimtaɣu (ᠲᠠᠬᠢᠮᠳᠠᠭᠣ) in the Pre-classical Mongolian version of the Classic of Filial Piety.

== In traditional texts ==
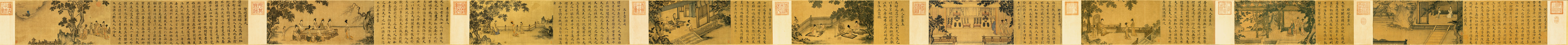
Illustrations of the Ladies' Classic of Filial Piety (detail), Song dynasty, depicting the section "Serving One's Parents-in-Law"

=== Definitions ===
Confucian teachings about filial piety can be found in numerous texts, including the Four Books, that is the Great Learning (大學), the Doctrine of the Mean (中庸), Analects (論語), and the book Mencius, as well as the works Classic of Filial Piety (孝經) and the Book of Rites (禮記). In the Classic of Filial Piety, Confucius (551–479 BCE) says that "filial piety is the root of virtue and the basis of philosophy" and modern philosopher Fung Yu-lan describes filial piety as "the ideological basis for traditional [Chinese] society".

For Confucius, filial piety is not merely a ritual outside respect to one's parents, but an inward attitude as well. Filial piety consists of several aspects. Filial piety is an awareness of repaying the burden borne by one's parents. As such, filial piety is done to reciprocate the care one's parents have given. However, it is also practiced because of an obligation towards one's ancestors.

According to some modern scholars, xiào is the root of rén (仁; "benevolence, humaneness"), but other scholars state that rén, as well as yì (義; "righteousness") and li (禮; "propriety") should be interpreted as the roots of xiào. Rén means favorable behavior to those whom we are close to. Yì refers to respect to those considered worthy of respect, such as parents and superiors. Li is defined as behaving according to social norms and cultural values. Moreover, it is defined in the texts as deference, which is respectful submission, and reverence, meaning deep respect and awe. Filial piety was taught by Confucius as part of a broad ideal of self-cultivation (君子; jūnzǐ) toward being a perfect human being.

Modern philosopher Hu Shih argued that filial piety gained its central role in Confucian ideology only among later Confucianists. He proposed that Confucius originally taught the quality of rén in general, and did not yet emphasize xiào as much. Only later Confucianists such as Tseng Tzu focused on xiào as the single most important Confucianist quality.

=== Detailed descriptions ===
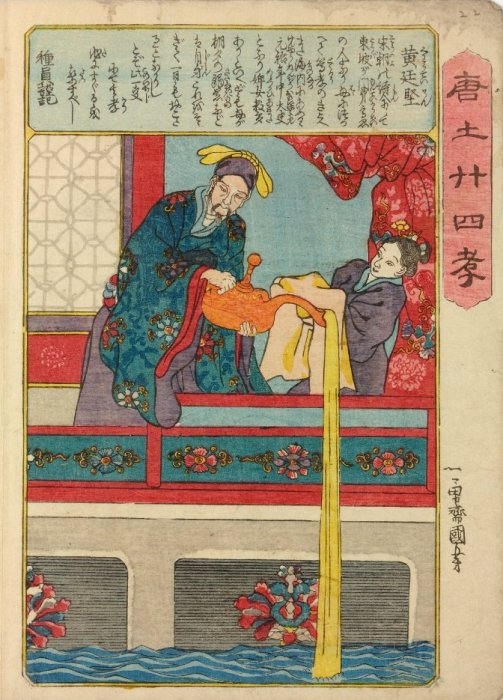
Koteiken, one of The Twenty-four Cases of Filial Piety, depicted emptying a chamber pot for his mother. Utagawa Kuniyoshi, 1848.

Confucian ethics does not regard filial piety as a choice, but rather as an unconditional obligation of the child. The relationship between parents and children is the most fundamental of the five cardinal relationships (五倫; wǔlún) described by Confucius in his role ethics. Filial piety, together with fraternal love, underlies this system. It is the fundamental principle of Confucian morality: Filial piety was seen as the basis for an orderly society, together with loyalty of the ministers toward the ruler, and servitude of the wife toward the husband. In short, filial piety is central to Confucian role ethics and is the cardinal virtue that defines, limits, or even overrides all other virtues.

According to the traditional texts, filial piety consists of physical care, love, service, respect, and obedience. (Note: See Kwan (2000, p. 24), Yee (2006) and Sung (2009a, p. 187). Only Kwan mentions love.) Children should attempt not to bring disgrace upon their parents. Confucian texts such as Book of Rites give details on how filial piety should be practiced. Respect is envisioned by detailed manners such as the way children salute their parents, speak to them (words and tone used), or enter and leave the room in which their parents are, as well as seating arrangements and gifts. (Note: See Sung (2001, p. 16) and Sung (2009a, p. 187). Only his 2001 article mentions the seats and gifts.) Care means making sure parents are comfortable in every single way: this involves food, accommodation, clothes, hygiene, and basically to have them "see and hear pleasurable things" (in Confucius' words) and to have them live without worry. But the most important expressions of, and exercises in, filial piety were the burial and mourning rituals to be held in honor of one's parents.

Filial piety means to be good to one's parents; to take care of one's parents; to engage in good conduct not just towards parents but also outside the home so as to bring a good name to one's parents and ancestors; to perform the duties of one's job well (preferably the same job as one's parents to fulfill their aspirations); to carry out sacrifices to the ancestors; to not be rebellious; to be polite and well-mannered; to show love, respect, and support; to be near home to serve one's parents; to display courtesy; to ensure male heirs; to uphold fraternity among brothers; to wisely advise one's parents, including dissuading them from moral unrighteousness; to display sorrow for their sickness and death; and to bury them and carry out sacrifices after their death. Furthermore, a filial child should promote the public name of its family, and it should cherish the affection of its parents.

Traditional texts essentially describe filial piety in terms of a son-father relationship, but in practice, it involves all parent-child relationships, as well as relationships with stepparents, grandparents, and ancestors.

Filial piety also involves the role of the parent to the child. The father has a duty to provide for the son, to teach him in traditions of ancestor worship, to find a spouse for him, and to leave a good heritage. A father is supposed to be "stern and dignified" to his children, whereas a mother is supposed to be "gentle and compassionate". The parents' virtues are to be practiced, regardless of the child's piety, and vice versa. Nevertheless, filial piety mostly identified the child's duty, and in this, it differed from the Roman concept of patria potestas, which defined mostly the father's authoritative power. Whereas in Roman culture, and later in the Judeo-Christian West, people in authority legitimized their influence by referring to a higher transcending power, in Chinese culture, authority was defined by the roles of the subordinates (son, subject, wife) to their superior (father, emperor, husband) and vice versa. As roles and duties were depersonalized, supremacy became a matter of role and position, rather than person, as it was in the West.

Anthropologist Francis Hsu argued that a child's obedience from a Confucian perspective was regarded as unconditional, but anthropologist David K. Jordan and psychologist David Yau-fai Ho disagree. Jordan states that in classical Chinese thought, "remonstrance" was part of filial piety, meaning that a pious child needs to dissuade a parent from performing immoral actions. Ho points out in this regard that the Confucian classics do not advocate "foolish filial piety" (愚孝; yúxiào). However, Jordan adds that if the parent does not listen to the child's dissuasion, the child must still obey the parent, and Ho states that "rebellion or outright defiance" is never approved in Confucian ethics.

Filial piety not only extends to behavior of children toward their parents, but also involves gratitude toward the human body they received from their parents, as the body is seen as an extension of one's parents. This involves prohibitions on damaging or hurting the body, and this doctrine has affected how the Confucianists regarded the shaving of the head by Buddhist monks, but also has created a taboo on suicide, regarded as "unfilial behavior" (不孝; bùxiào). (Note: See Sun, Long & Boore (2007, p. 256). Hamilton (1990, p. 102, note 56) offers this rendering in English.)

=== Relation with society at large ===
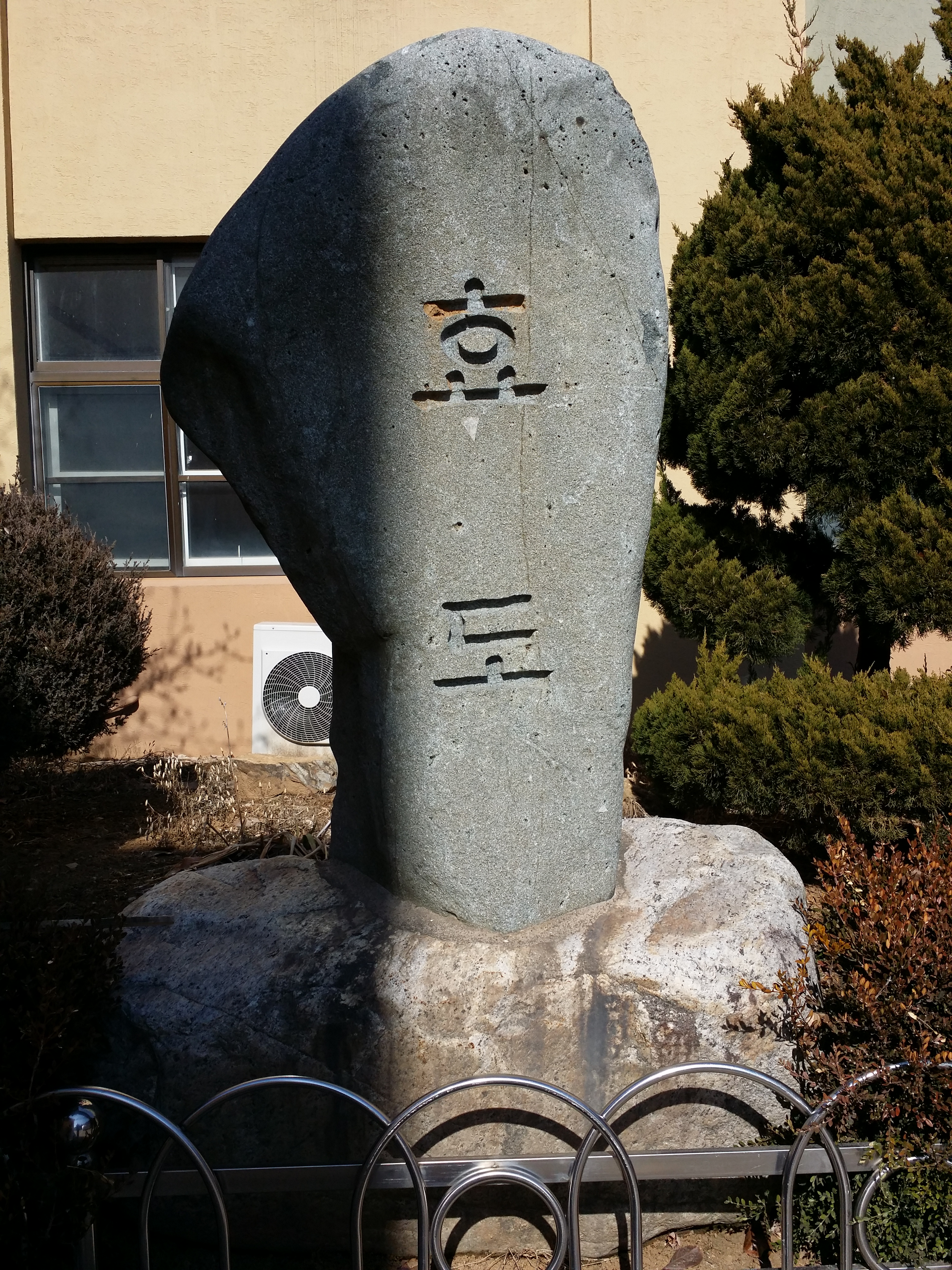
A memorial stone at a Korean elementary school, with the inscription "filial piety"

Filial piety is regarded as a principle that ordered society, without which chaos would prevail. It is described as "an inevitable fact of nature", as opposed to mere convention, and it is seen to follow naturally out of the father-son relationship. In the Chinese tradition of patriarchy, roles are upheld to maintain the harmony of the whole. According to the Neo-Confucian philosopher Cheng Hao (1032–1085 CE), relationships and their corresponding roles "belong to the eternal principle of the cosmos from which there is no escape between heaven and earth".

The idea of filial piety became popular in China because of the many functions it had and many roles it undertook, as the traditional Confucian scholars such as Mencius (4th century BCE) regarded the family as a fundamental unit that formed the root of the nation. Though the virtue of xiào was about respect by children toward their parents, it was meant to regulate how the young generation behaved toward elders in the extended family and in society in general. Furthermore, devotion to one's parents was often associated with one's devotion to the state, (Note: See Analects 1:2, Xiao Jing (chap.1)) described as the "parallel conception of society" or the "Model of Two". The Classic of Filial Piety states that an obedient and filial son will grow up to become a loyal official (chung)—filial piety was therefore seen as a truth that shaped the citizens of the state, and the loyalty of the minister to his emperor was regarded as the extension of filial piety. Filial piety was regarded as being a dutiful person in general.

Nevertheless, the two were not equated. Mencius teaches that ministers should overthrow an immoral tyrant, should he harm the state; the loyalty to the king was considered conditional, not as unconditional as in filial piety towards one parents.

== In East Asian languages and cultures ==
Confucian teachings about filial piety have left their mark on East Asian languages and culture. In Chinese, there is a saying that "among hundreds of behaviors, filial piety is the most important one" (百善孝为先; bǎi shàn xiào wéi xiān).

In modern Chinese, filial piety is rendered with the words xiào shùn (孝顺), meaning "respect and obedience". While China has always had a diversity of religious beliefs, filial piety has been common to almost all of them; historian Hugh D.R. Baker calls respect for the family the one element common to almost all Chinese people. Historian Ch'ü T'ung-tsu stated about the codification of patriarchy in Chinese law that "[i]t was all a question of filial piety". Filial piety also forms the basis for the veneration of the aged, for which the Chinese are known. However, filial piety among the Chinese has led them to be mostly focused on taking care of close kin, and be less interested in wider issues of more distant people: nevertheless, this should not be mistaken for individualism.

In Japan, devotion to kinship relations was and still is much more broadly construed, involving more than just kin.

In Korean culture, filial piety is also of crucial importance. However, filial piety in the later Joseon dynasty, created a tension for women on marriage, between "filial values" and "filial emotions" during the later Joseon dynasty, since women, on marrying, owed their filial piety to their husband's family and not to their birth family. These tensions and the normative values of this neo-Confucian patrilineal and patriarchal society are evidenced in pansori and the many versions of various moral tales. Books published on filial piety include Hyohaengrok (효행록) first published in late Goryeo times and revised and republished in 1428, and the Register of Loyalty and Filial Piety (1655-1788) (효행등제등록) a register of those receiving government rewards for filial piety from 1655 to 1788.

In Taiwan, filial piety is considered one of eight important virtues, among which filial piety is considered supreme. It is "central in all thinking about human behavior". Taiwan generally has more traditional values with regard to the parent-child relationship than the People's Republic of China (PRC). This is reflected in attitudes about how desirable it is for the elderly to live independently.

== In behavioral sciences ==
Social scientists have researched filial piety and related concepts. It is a highly influential factor in studies about Asian families and in intergenerational studies, as well as studies on socialization patterns. Filial piety is defined by several scholars as the recognition by children of the aid and care their parents have given them, and the respect returned by those children. Psychologist K.S. Yang defined it as a "specific, complex syndrome or set of cognition, affects, intentions, and behaviors concerning being good or nice to one's parents". As of 2006, psychologists measured filial piety in inconsistent ways, which makes it difficult to progress.

Filial piety is defined by behaviors such as daily maintenance, respect, and sickness care offered to the elderly. Although in scholarly literature five forms of reverence have been described, multi-cultural researcher Kyu-taik Sung added eight more to that, to cover the traditional definitions of elder respect in Confucian texts:

Care respect	making sure parents are comfortable in every single way
Victual respect	taking the parents' preferences into account, e.g. favorite food
Gift respect	giving gifts or favors, e.g. presiding meetings
Presentational respect	polite and appropriate decorum
Linguistic respect	use of honorific language
Spatial respect	having elders sit at a place of honor, building graves at respectful places
Celebrative respect	celebrating birthdays or other events in honor of elders
Public respect	voluntary and public services for elders
Acquiescent respect	listening to elders without talking back
Consultative respect	consulting elders in personal and family matters
Salutatory respect	bowing or saluting elders
Precedential respect	allowing elders to have priority in distributing goods and services
Funeral respect	mourning and burying elders in a respectful way
Ancestor respect	commemorating ancestors and making sacrifices for them

These forms of respect are based on qualitative research. Some of these forms involve some action or work, whereas other forms are more symbolic. Female elders tend to receive more care respect, whereas male elders tend to receive more symbolic respect.

Apart from attempting to define filial piety, psychologists have also attempted to explain its cognitive development. Psychologist R.M. Lee distinguishes a five-fold development, which he bases on Lawrence Kohlberg's theory of moral development. In the first stage, filial piety is comprehended as just the giving of material things, whereas in the second stage this develops into an understanding that emotional and spiritual support is more important. In the third stage, the child realizes that filial piety is crucial in establishing and keeping parent-child relationships; in the fourth stage, this is expanded to include relationships outside of one's family. In the final stage, filial piety is regarded as a means to realize one's ethical ideals.

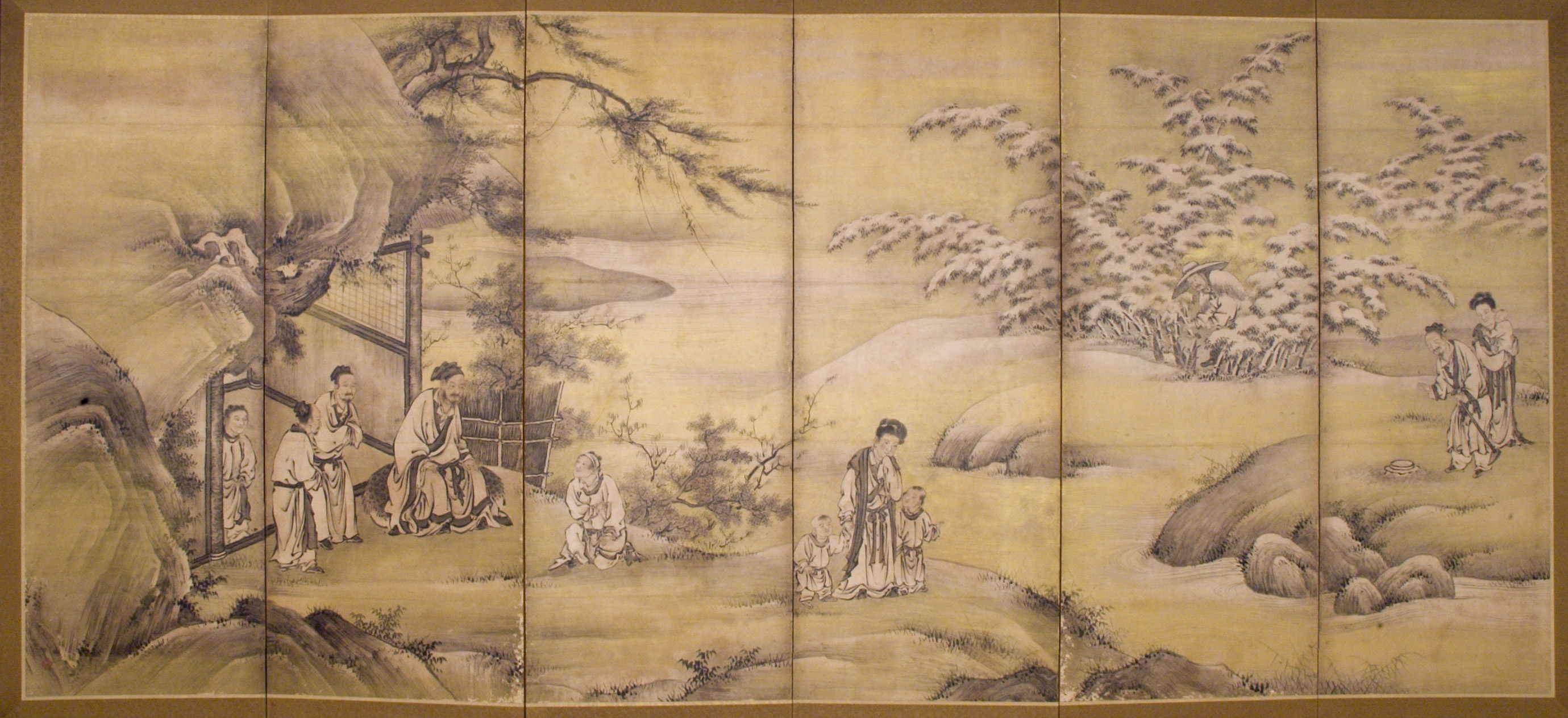
Painting with scenes from The Twenty-four Cases of Filial Piety. Kano Motonobu, 1550

Psychologists have found correlations between filial piety and lower socio-economic status, female gender, elders, minorities, and non-westernized cultures. Traditional filial piety beliefs have been connected with positive outcomes for the community and society, care for elder family members, positive family relationships, and solidarity. Filial piety has also been related to an orientation to the past, resistance to cognitive change, superstition and fatalism, dogmatism, authoritarianism, conformism, a belief in the superiority of one's culture, and a lack of active, critical, and creative learning attitudes. (Note: For the resistance to change and attitudes of superiority, see Kwan (2000, pp. 27, 34). For the other consequences, see Yee (2006). Ho (1994, p. 361) also describes the link with resistance to change, the learning attitudes, fatalism, dogmatism, authoritarianism and conformism.) Ho connects the value of filial piety with authoritarian moralism and cognitive conservatism in Chinese patterns of socialization, basing this on findings among subjects in Hong Kong and Taiwan. He defines authoritarian moralism as hierarchical authority ranking in family and institutions, and pervasive use of moral precepts as criteria of measuring people. Cognitive moralism he derives from social psychologist Anthony Greenwald, and is a "disposition to preserve existing knowledge structures" and resistance to change. He concludes that filial piety appears to have a negative effect on psychological development, but at the same time, partly explains the high motivation of Chinese people to achieve academic results.

In family counselling research, filial piety has been seen to help establish bonding with parents. Ho argues that filial piety brings along an obligation to raise one's children in a moral way to prevent disgrace to the family. However, filial piety has also been found to perpetuate dysfunctional family patterns such as child abuse: there may be both positive and negative psychological effects. Francis Hsu argued that pro-family attitudes informed by filial piety, when taken on the level of the family at large, can lead to nepotism and corruption, and are at tension with the good of the state as whole.

In Chinese parent-child relations, the aspect of authority goes hand-in-hand with the aspect of benevolence. For example, many Chinese parents support their children's education fully and do not allow their children to work during their studies, which allows them to focus on their studies. Because of this combination of benevolence and authoritarianism in such relations, children feel obliged to respond to parents' expectations, and internalize them. Ho found, however, that in Chinese parent-child relations, fear also contributed to meeting parents' filial expectations: children may not internalize their parents' expectations, but rather perform roles as good children in a detached way, through affect-role dissociation. Studying Korean family relations, scholar Dawnhee Yim argues that internalization of parents' obligations by children may lead to guilt, as well as suppression of hostile thoughts toward parents, leading to psychological problems. Jordan found that despite filial piety being asymmetrical in nature, Chinese interviewees felt that filial piety contained an element of reciprocity: "...it is easy to see the parent whom one serves today as the self who is served tomorrow." Furthermore, the practice of filial piety provides the pious child with a sense of adulthood and moral heroism.

== History ==
=== Pre-Confucian history ===
The origins of filial piety in East Asia lie in ancestor worship, and can already be found in the pre-Confucian period. Epigraphical findings such as oracle bones contain references to filial piety. Texts such as the Classic of Changes (10th–4th century BCE) may contain early references to the parallel conception of the filial son and the loyal minister.

=== Early Confucianism ===
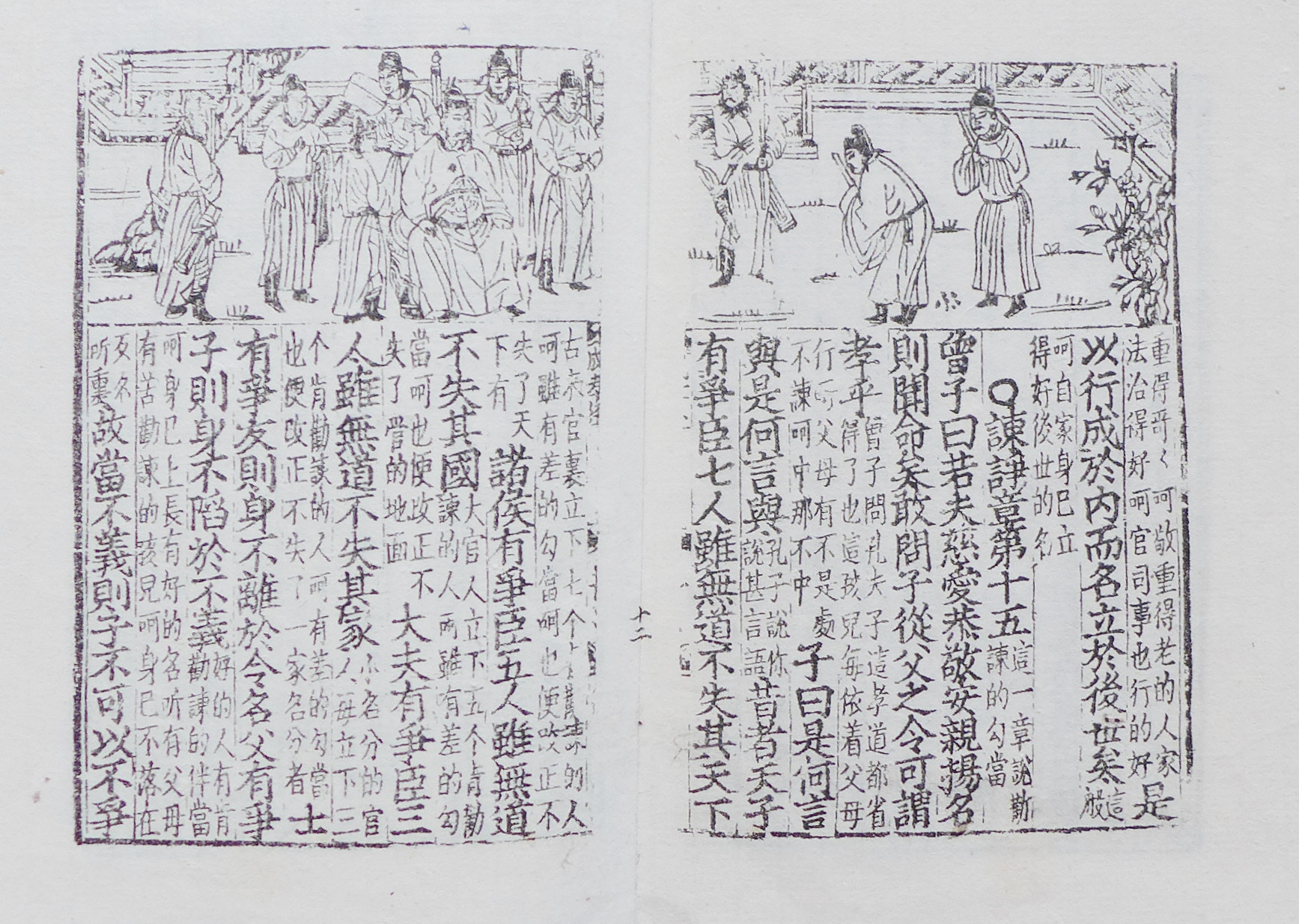
Page of the illustrated version of the Classic of Filial Piety, annotated by Kuan (1286–1324)

In the Tang dynasty (6th–10th century), not performing filial piety was declared illegal, and even earlier, during the Han dynasty (2nd century BCE–3rd century CE), this was punished by beheading. Behavior regarded as unfilial such as mistreating or abandoning one's parents or grandparents, or refusing to complete the mourning period for them, was punished by exile and beating, or worse.

From the Han dynasty onward, the practice of mourning rites came to be seen as the cornerstone of filial piety and was strictly practiced and enforced. This was a period of unrest, and the state promoted the practice of long-term mourning to reestablish its authority. Filial piety toward one's parents was expected to lead to loyalty to the ruler, expressed in the Han proverb "The Emperor rules all-under-heaven with filial piety". Government officials were expected to take leave for a mourning period of two years after their parents died. Local officials were expected to encourage filial piety to one's parents—and by extension, to the state—by behaving as an example of such piety. The king himself would express filial piety in an exemplary way, through the ritual of "serving the elderly" (yang lao zhi li). Nearly all Han emperors had the word xiào in their temple name. The promotion of filial piety in this manner, as part of the idea of li, was a less confrontational way to create order in society than resorting to law.

Filial piety was a keystone of Han morality.

During the early Confucian period, the principles of filial piety were brought back by Japanese and Korean students to their respective homelands, where they became central to the education system. In Japan, rulers gave awards to people deemed to practice exemplary filial conduct.

During the Mongolian rule in the Yuan dynasty (13th–14th century), the practice of filial piety was perceived to deteriorate. In the Ming dynasty (14th–17th century), emperors and literati attempted to revive the customs of filial piety. Though in that process, filial piety was reinterpreted, as rules and rituals were modified. Even on the grassroots level a revival was seen, as vigilante societies started to promote Confucian values. Members of this vigilance movement composed the book The Twenty-four Cases of Filial Piety.

=== Introduction of Buddhism ===
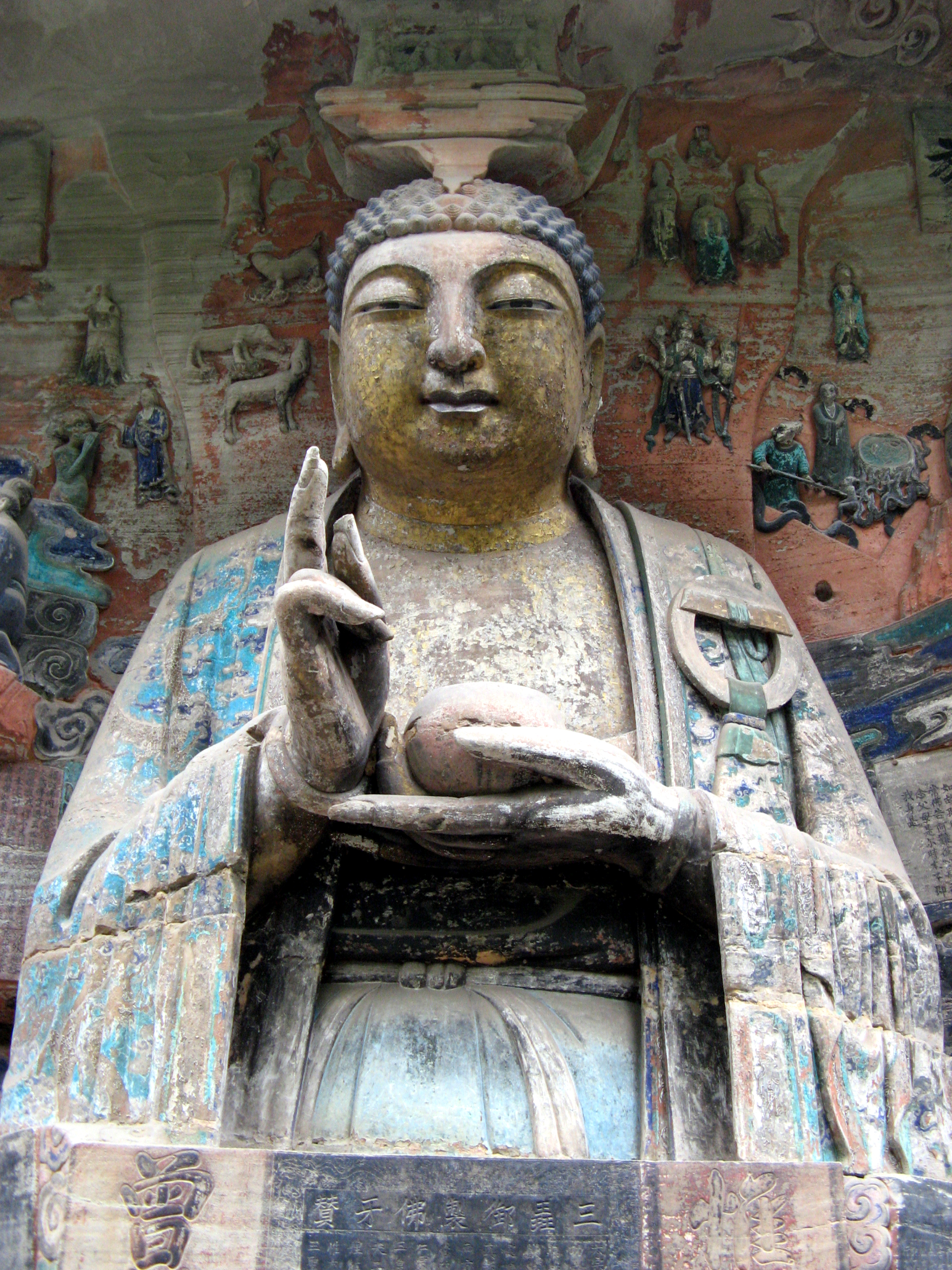
Buddha image with scenes of stories in which he repaid his parents. Mount Baoding Buddhist Sculptures, Dazu, China.

Filial piety has been an important aspect of Buddhist ethics since early Buddhism, and was essential in the apologetics and texts of Chinese Buddhism. In the Early Buddhist Texts such as the Nikāyas and Āgamas, filial piety is prescribed and practiced in three ways: to repay the gratitude toward one's parents; as a good karma or merit; and as a way to contribute to and sustain the social order. Buddhist scriptures portray the Buddha and his disciples practicing filial piety toward their parents, based on the qualities of gratitude and reciprocity.

Initially, scholars of Buddhism like Kenneth Ch'en saw Buddhist teachings on filial piety as a distinct feature of Chinese Buddhism. Later scholarship, led by people such as John Strong and Gregory Schopen, has come to believe that filial piety was part of Buddhist doctrine since early times. Strong and Schopen provided epigraphical and textual evidence to show that early Buddhist laypeople, monks, and nuns often displayed strong devotion to their parents, and concluded that filial piety was already an important part of the devotional life of early Buddhists.

When Buddhism was introduced in China, it had no organized celibacy. Confucianism emphasized filial piety to parents and loyalty to the emperor, and Buddhist monastic life was seen to go against its tenets. In the 3rd–5th century CE, as criticism of Buddhism increased, Buddhist monastics and lay authors responded by writing about and translating Buddhist doctrines and narratives that supported filial piety, comparing them to Confucianism and thereby defending Buddhism and its value in society. The Mouzi Lihuolun referred to Confucian and Daoist classics, as well as historical precedents to respond to critics of Buddhism. The Mouzi stated that while on the surface the Buddhist monk seems to reject and abandon his parents, he is actually aiding his parents as well as himself on the path towards enlightenment. Sun Chuo (c. 300–380) further argued that monks were working to ensure the salvation of all people and making their family proud by doing so, and Liu Xie stated that Buddhists practiced filial piety by sharing merit with their departed relatives. Buddhist monks were also criticized for not expressing their respect to the Chinese emperor by prostrating and other devotion, which in Confucianism was associated with the virtue of filial piety. Huiyuan (334–416) responded that although monks did not express such piety, they did pay homage in heart and mind; moreover, their teaching of morality and virtue to the public helped support imperial rule.

From the 6th century onward, Chinese Buddhists realized they had to stress Buddhism's own particular ideas about filial piety in order for Buddhism to survive. Śyāma, Sujāti, and other Buddhist stories of self-sacrifice spread a belief that a filial child should even be willing to sacrifice its own body. The Ullambana Sūtra introduced the idea of transfer of merit through the story of Mulian Saves His Mother and led to the establishment of the Ghost Festival. By this Buddhists attempted to show that filial piety also meant taking care of one's parents in the next life, not just this life. Furthermore, authors in China—and Tibet, and to some extent Japan—wrote that in Buddhism, all living beings have once been one's parents, and that practicing compassion to all living beings as though they were one's parents is the superior form of filial piety. Another aspect emphasized was the great suffering a mother goes through when giving birth and raising a child. Chinese Buddhists described how difficult it is to repay the goodness of one's mother, and how many sins mothers committed in raising their children. The mother became the primary source of well-being and indebtedness for the son, which was in contrast with pre-Buddhist perspectives emphasizing the father. Nevertheless, although critics of Buddhism did not have much impact during this time, this changed in the period leading up to the Neo-Confucianist revival, when Emperor Wu Zong (841–845) started the Great Anti-Buddhist Persecution, citing lack of filial piety as one of his reasons for attacking Buddhist institutions.

Filial piety is still an important value in some Asian Buddhist cultures. In China, Buddhism continued to uphold a role in state rituals and mourning rites for ancestors until late imperial times (13th–20th century). Sūtras and narratives about filial piety are still widely used. The Ghost Festival is still popular in many Asian countries, especially those countries which are influenced by both Buddhism and Confucianism.

=== Late imperial period ===
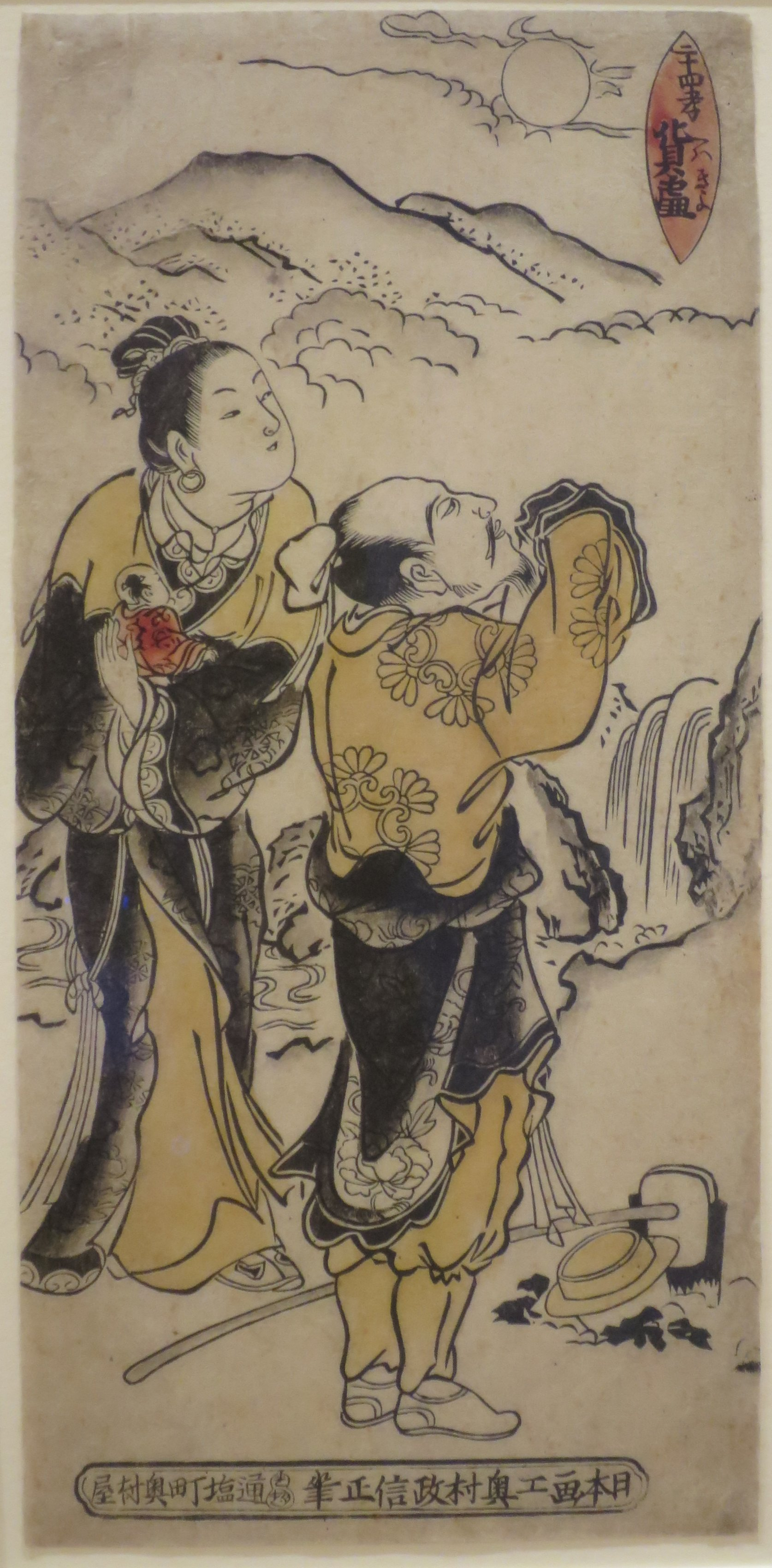
Woodblock print with illustration of The Twenty-four Cases of Filial Piety. Okumura Masanobu, early 1730s.

During the 17th century, some missionaries tried to prevent Chinese people from worshiping their ancestors. This was regarded as an assault on Chinese culture.

During the Qing dynasty, however, filial piety was redefined by the Kangxi Emperor, who felt it more important that his officials were loyal to him than that they were filial sons. Civil servants were often not allowed to go on extended leave to perform mourning rituals for their parents. The parallel conception of society therefore disappeared from Chinese society.

Patriarchalism and its enactment in law grew more strict in late imperial China. The duties of the obedient child were much more precisely and rigidly prescribed, to the extent that legal scholar Hsu Dau-lin argued about this period that it "engendered a highly authoritarian spirit which was entirely alien to Confucius himself". The late imperial Chinese held patriarchalism high as an organizing principle of society, as laws and punishments gradually became more strict and severe.

During the same time, in Japan, a classic work about filial practices was compiled, called Biographies of Japanese Filial Children (Japanese pronunciation: Fu San Ko Shi Dan).

=== 19th–20th century ===
During the rise of progressivism and communism in China in the early 20th century, Confucian values and family-centered living were discouraged by the state and intellectuals. During the New Culture Movement of 1911, Chinese intellectuals and foreign missionaries attacked the principle of filial piety, the latter considering it an obstruction of progress.

In Japan, filial piety was not regarded as an obstacle to modernization, though scholars disagree about why this was so. Francis Hsu believed that "the human networks through which it found concrete expressions" were different in Japan, and there never was a movement against filial piety as there was in China.

The late imperial trend of increased patriarchalism made it difficult for the Chinese to build strong patrimonial groups that went beyond kin. Though filial piety was practiced much in both China and Japan, the Chinese way was more limited to close kin than in Japan. When industrialization increased, filial piety was therefore criticized more in China than in Japan, because China felt it limited the way the country could meet the challenges from the West. For this reason, China developed a more critical stance towards filial piety and other aspects of Confucianism than other East Asian countries, including not only Japan, but also Taiwan.

In the 1950s, Mao Zedong's socialist measures led to the dissolution of family businesses and more dependence on the state; Taiwan's socialism did not go as far in state control.

Ethnographic evidence from the 19th and early 20th century shows that Chinese people still very much cared for their elders, who very often lived with one or more married sons.

== Developments in modern society ==
In 21st-century Chinese societies, filial piety expectations and practices have decreased. One cause for this is the rise of the nuclear family without much coresidence with parents. Families are becoming smaller because of family planning and housing shortages. Other causes are individualism, the loss of status of the elderly, emigration of young people to cities, and the independence of young people and women. (Note: See Fung & Cheng (2010, p. 315) for the nuclear family, individualism, loss of status, emigration and female independence. See Sung (2009a, p. 180) for the causes of the rise of the nuclear family and the independence of young people.) Amplifying this trend, the number of elderly people has increased quickly.

The relationship between husband and wife came to be more emphasized, and the extended family less so. Kinship ties between the husband and wife's families have become more bilateral and equal. The way respect to elders is expressed is also changing. Communication with elders tends to become more reciprocal and less one-way, and kindness and courtesy is replacing obedience and subservience.

=== Care-giving ===
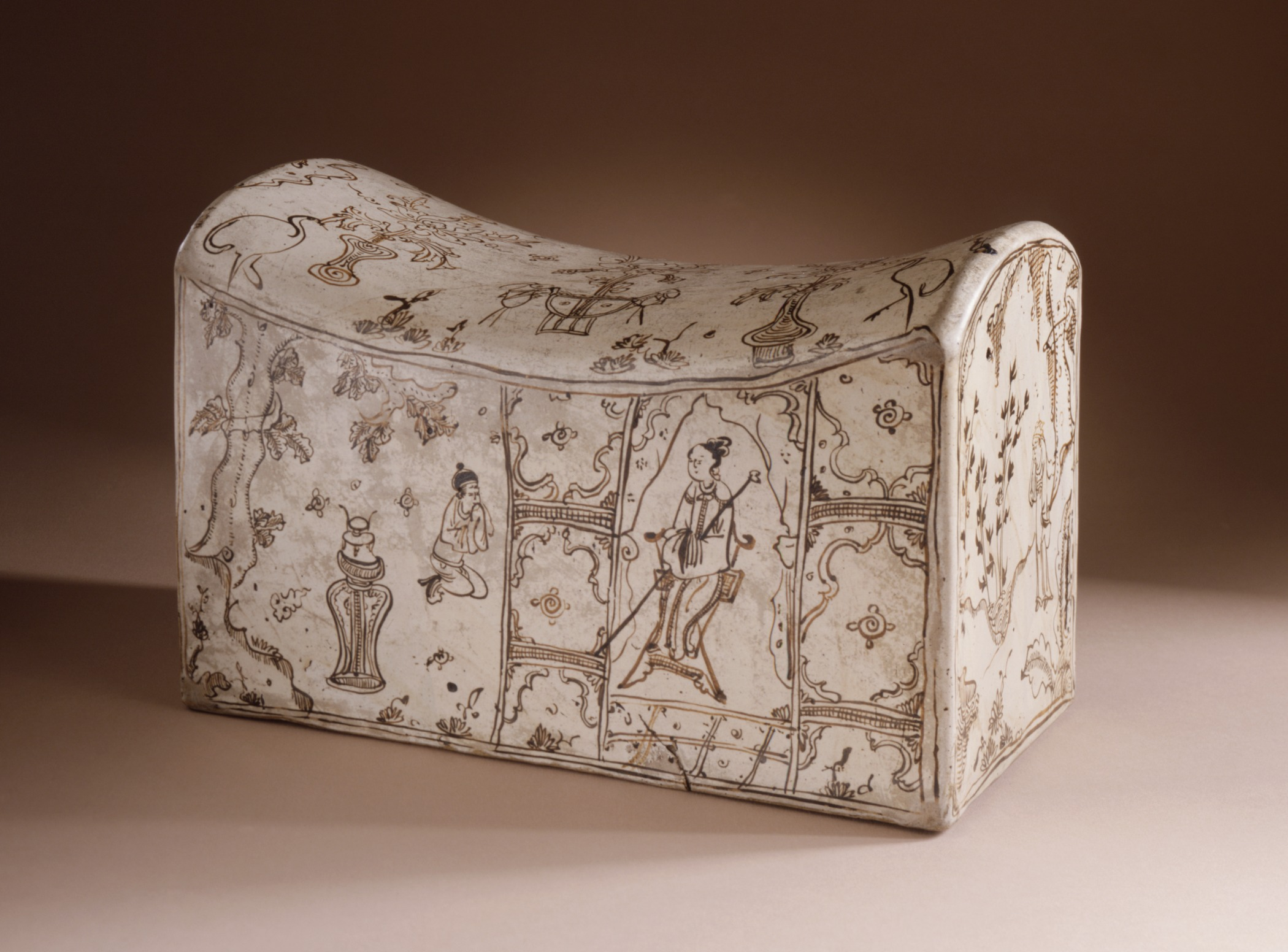
Stone headrest with scenes of filial piety, Ming dynasty (1368–1644)

In modern Chinese societies, elder care has changed. Studies show a discrepancy between parents' filial expectations and the behaviors of their children. The discrepancy with regard to respect shown by the children makes elderly people especially unhappy. Industrialization and urbanization have affected the practice of filial piety, with care being given more in financial than in personal ways. As of 2009, care-giving of elderly people by the young had not undergone any revolutionary changes in the PRC, and family obligations still remained strong, "almost automatic". Respect to elders remains a central value for East Asian people.

Comparing data from the 1990s from Taiwan and the PRC, sociologist Martin Whyte concluded that the elderly in Taiwan often received less support from the government, but more assistance from their children, than in China.

=== Work ethos and business practices ===
In PRC business culture, filial piety is decreasing in influence. As of 2003, western-style business practices and managerial style were promoted by the Chinese government to modernize the country. However, in Japan employees usually regard their employer as a sort of father, to which they feel obliged to express filial devotion.

=== Relation with law ===
In some societies with large Chinese communities, legislation has been introduced to establish or uphold filial piety. In the 2000s, Singapore introduced a law that makes it an offense to refuse to support one's elderly parents; Taiwan took similar punitive measures. Hong Kong, on the other hand, attempted to influence its population by providing incentives for fulfilling their obligations. For example, certain tax allowances are given to citizens who live with their elderly parents.

Some scholars argued that medieval China's reliance on governance by filial piety formed a society that was better able to prevent crime and other misconduct than societies that did so only through legal means.

== See also ==
- Child abuse in China
- Honour thy father and thy mother – One of the Ten Commandments

== Bibliography ==
- Baker, Hugh D. R. (1979), Chinese Family and Kinship, Columbia University Press
- Chan, Alan Kam-leung; Tan, Sor-hoon (2004), "Introduction", Filial Piety in Chinese Thought and History, Psychology Press, p. 1–11, ISBN 978-0-415-33365-8
- Ch'en, Kenneth (1968), "Filial Piety in Chinese Buddhism", Harvard Journal of Asiatic Studies, 28: 81–97, doi:10.2307/2718595, ISSN 0073-0548, JSTOR 2718595
- Chang, Wonsuk; Kalmanson, Leah (8 November 2010), Confucianism in Context: Classic Philosophy and Contemporary Issues, East Asia and Beyond, SUNY Press, ISBN 978-1-4384-3191-8
- Ch'en, K. (1973), The Chinese Transformation of Buddhism, Princeton University Press
- Chow, N. (2009), "Filial Piety in Asian Chinese Communities", in Sung, K.T.; Kim, B.J. (eds.), Respect for the Elderly: Implications for Human Service Providers, University Press of America, pp. 319–24, ISBN 978-0-7618-4530-0
- Cole, R. Alan (1994), Mothers and Sons in Chinese Buddhism, Stanford University Press, ISBN 978-0-8047-6510-7
- Cong, Y. (2004), "Doctor–family–patient Relationship: The Chinese Paradigm of Informed Consent", The Journal of Medicine and Philosophy, 29 (2): 149–78, doi:10.1076/jmep.29.2.149.31506, PMID 15371185
- Fu, P.P.; Tsui, A.S. (2003), "Utilizing Printed Media to Understand Desired Leadership Attributes in the People's Republic of China", Asia Pacific Journal of Management, 20 (4): 423–46, doi:10.1023/A:1026373124564, S2CID 150686669
- Fung, H.H.; Cheng, S.T. (2010), "Psychology and Aging in the Land of the Panda", Oxford Handbook of Chinese Psychology, Oxford University Press, pp. 309–26, ISBN 978-0-19-954185-0
- Hamilton, G.G. (1990), "Patriarchy, Patrimonialism, and Filial Piety: A Comparison of China and Western Europe", British Journal of Sociology, 41 (1): 77–104, doi:10.2307/591019, JSTOR 591019
- Ho, D. Y. F. (1994), "Filial Piety, Authoritarian Moralism and Cognitive Conservatism in Chinese Societies", Genetic, Social, and General Psychology Monographs, 120 (3): 349–65, hdl:10722/53184, ISSN 8756-7547, PMID 7926697
- Hsu, C.Y.; O'Connor, M.; Lee, S. (22 January 2009), "Understandings of Death and Dying for People of Chinese Origin", Death Studies, 33 (2): 153–174, doi:10.1080/07481180802440431, PMID 19143109, S2CID 1446735
- Hsu, F.L.K. (1998), "Confucianism in Comparative Context", in Slote, Walter H.; Vos, George A. De (eds.), Confucianism and the Family, SUNY Press, pp. 53–74, ISBN 978-0-7914-3736-0
- Hsu, J. (1985), "Family Relations, Problems and Therapy", in Tseng, W.S.; Wu, D.Y.H. (eds.), Chinese Culture and Mental Health, Academic Press, pp. 95–112
- Idema, Wilt L. (2009), Filial Piety and Its Divine Rewards: The Legend of Dong Yong and Weaving Maiden with Related Texts, Hackett Publishing, ISBN 978-1-60384-219-8
- Ikels, C. (2004), Filial piety: Practice and Discourse in Contemporary East Asia, Stanford University Press, ISBN 978-0-8047-4791-2
- Jordan, D.K. (1998), "Filial Piety in Taiwanese Popular Thought", in Slote, Walter H.; Vos, George A. De (eds.), Confucianism and the Family, SUNY Press, pp. 267–84, ISBN 978-0-7914-3736-0
- King, A.Y.; Bond, M.H. (1985), "The Confucian Paradigm of Man: A Sociological View", in Tseng, W.S.; Wu, D.Y.H. (eds.), Chinese Culture and Mental Health, Academic Press, pp. 2–45
- Knapp, K.N. (2014), "Chinese Filial Cannibalism: A Silk Road Import?", in Wong, D.C.; Heldt, Gusthav (eds.), China and Beyond in the Mediaeval Period: Cultural Crossings and Inter-regional Connections, Cambria Press, pp. 135–49, archived from the original on 2019-07-12
- Kohn, L. (2004), "Immortal Parents and Universal Kin: Family Values in Medieval Daoism", in Chan, A.K.; Tan, S. (eds.), Filial Piety in Chinese Thought and History, Routledge, pp. 91–109, ISBN 0-203-41388-1
- Kunio, M. (2004), "Filial Piety and "Authentic Parents"", in Chan, A.K.; Tan, S. (eds.), Filial Piety in Chinese Thought and History, Routledge, pp. 111–110, ISBN 0-203-41388-1
- Kutcher, N. (2006), Mourning in Late Imperial China: Filial Piety and the State, Cambridge University Press, ISBN 978-0-521-03018-2
- Kwan, K.L.K. (2000), "Counseling Chinese peoples: Perspectives of Filial Piety" (PDF), Asian Journal of Counseling, 7 (1): 23–41, archived from the original (PDF) on 2016-07-05
- Li-tian, Fang (2010), China's Buddhist Culture, Cengage Learning Asia, ISBN 978-981-4281-42-3
- Mann, S.; Cheng, Y.Y. (2001), Under Confucian Eyes: Writings on Gender in Chinese History, University of California Press, ISBN 978-0-520-22276-2
- Oh, Tai K. (February 1991), "Understanding Managerial Values and Behaviour among the Gang of Four: South Korea, Taiwan, Singapore and Hong Kong", Journal of Management Development, 10 (2): 46–56, doi:10.1108/02621719110141095
- Schopen, G. (1997), Bones, Stones, and Buddhist Monks: Collected Papers on the Archaeology, Epigraphy, and Texts of Monastic Buddhism in India, University of Hawaii Press, ISBN 978-0-8248-1870-8
- Smith, R.J. (1993), "Buddhism and the "Great Persecution" in China", in Keulman, Kenneth (ed.), Critical Moments in Religious History, pp. 59–76, archived from the original on 2019-06-24
- Strong, John (1983), "Filial Piety And Buddhism: The Indian Antecedents to a "Chinese" Problem" (PDF), in Slater, P.; Wiebe, D. (eds.), Traditions in Contact and Change: Selected Proceedings of the XIVth Congress Of The International Association for the History Of Religions, vol. 3, Wilfrid Laurier University Press, archived (PDF) from the original on 2017-05-06
- Sun, F.K.; Long, A.; Boore, J. (February 2007), "The Attitudes of Casualty Nurses in Taiwan to Patients Who Have Attempted Suicide", Journal of Clinical Nursing, 16 (2): 255–63, doi:10.1111/j.1365-2702.2005.01479.x, PMID 17239060
- Sung, K.T. (2001), "Elder Respect: Exploration of Ideals and Forms in East Asia", Journal of Aging Studies, 15 (1): 13–26, doi:10.1016/S0890-4065(00)00014-1
- Sung, K.T. (2009a), "Chinese Young Adults and Elder Respect Expressions in Modern Times", in Sung, K.T.; Kim, B.J. (eds.), Respect for the Elderly: Implications for Human Service Providers, University Press of America, pp. 179–216, ISBN 978-0-7618-4530-0
- Sung, K.T. (2009b), "Repayment for Parents' Kindness: Buddhist Way", in Sung, K.T.; Kim, B.J. (eds.), Respect for the Elderly: Implications for Human Service Providers, University Press of America, pp. 353–66, ISBN 978-0-7618-4530-0
- Truitt, Allison (2015), "Not a Day but a Vu Lan Season: Celebrating Filial Piety in the Vietnamese Diaspora", Journal of Asian American Studies, 18 (3): 289–311, doi:10.1353/jaas.2015.0025, S2CID 147509428
- Wang, K.T.; Yuen, M.; Slaney, R.B. (31 July 2008), "Perfectionism, Depression, Loneliness, and Life Satisfaction", The Counseling Psychologist, 37 (2): 249–74, doi:10.1177/0011000008315975, S2CID 145670225
- Wilson, Liz (June 2014), "Buddhism and Family", Religion Compass, 8 (6): 188–198, doi:10.1111/rec3.12107, S2CID 143311213, archived from the original on 2023-03-26
- Whyte, M.K. (2004), "Filial Obligations in Chinese Families: Paradoxes of Modernization" (PDF), in Ikels, Charlotte (ed.), Filial Piety: Practice and Discourse in Contemporary East Asia, Stanford University Press, pp. 106–27, ISBN 0-8047-4790-3, archived (PDF) from the original on 2022-01-25
- Xing, G. (2012), "Chinese Translation of Buddhist Sūtras Related to Filial Piety as a Response to Confucian Criticism of Buddhists Being Unfilial", in Sharma, Anita (ed.), Buddhism in East Asia: Aspects of History's First Universal Religion Presented in the Modern Context, Vidyanidhi Prakashan, pp. 75–86, ISBN 9789380651408, archived from the original on 2019-07-12
- Xing, G. (2016), "The Teaching and Practice of Filial Piety in Buddhism" (PDF), Journal of Law and Religion, 31 (2): 212–26, ISSN 1076-9005, archived (PDF) from the original on 2019-03-06
- Xing, G. (March 2018), "Filial Piety in Chinese Buddhism", Oxford Research Encyclopedia of Religion, doi:10.1093/acrefore/9780199340378.013.559, ISBN 978-0-19-934037-8, archived from the original on 2019-06-15
- Yee, B.W.K. (2006), "Filial Piety", in Jackson, Y. (ed.), Encyclopedia of Multicultural Psychology, SAGE Publications, p. 214, ISBN 978-1-4522-6556-8
- Yim, D. (1998), "Psychocultural Features of Ancestor Worship", in Slote, Walter H.; Vos, George A. De (eds.), Confucianism and the Family, SUNY Press, pp. 163–86, ISBN 978-0-7914-3736-0
- Zurcher, E. (2007), The Buddhist Conquest of China: The Spread and Adaptation of Buddhism in Early Medieval China (3rd ed.), Brill Publishers, ISBN 978-90-04-15604-3
