= Daniel Overmyer =

Daniel Overmyer may refer to:

- Daniel H. Overmyer (1924–2012), American businessman
- Daniel L. Overmyer (1935–2021), Canadian historian of Chinese religion
