= Daniel L. Overmyer =

Canadian historian of Chinese religion (1935–2021)

Daniel L. Overmyer FRSC (August 20, 1935 – November 24, 2021) was a Canadian historian of religion and academic who was Professor Emeritus in the Department of Asian Studies and the Centre for Chinese Research at the University of British Columbia. Overmyer was a pioneer in the study of Chinese popular thought, religion, and culture; popular religious sects of the late traditional and modern periods and their texts; and local rituals and beliefs practiced in villages, especially North China.

In 2002 colleagues and former students organized a conference in honor of his retirement. The essays and presentations were published in a festschrift, The People and the Dao, (Monumenta Serica Monograph Series LX). In 1988, he was elected Fellow in the Royal Society of Canada, and elected to the American Society for the Study of Religion and Honorary Professor in the Faculty of Arts at Shanghai Normal University. He has been a member of the editorial board of China Review International, Journal of Chinese Religions, Minsu Quyi (A Journal Of Chinese Folk Drama, Literature, And Religion), and Ching Feng, a Hong Kong journal of ecumenical Christianity.

== Early life and education ==
Overmyer was born on August 20, 1935, in Columbus, Ohio. His grandparents worked a farm south of the city. His parents went to China as Evangelical missionaries in 1940, during the Second Sino-Japanese War, and worked in Hunan province. Overmyer later recalled scenes of air battles between American Flying Tiger and Japanese planes. When American pilots were forced to land, Chinese villagers would bring them to the missionary compound. He spoke Chinese but he and his sister were home-schooled by his mother. The Japanese advance in 1944 forced the family to return to the States, but they returned to China briefly after the war.

He graduated in 1957 from Westmar College in Le Mars, Iowa, earning his B.A. in Biology. In 1960 he received a Bachelor of Divinity from Evangelical Theological Seminary in Naperville, Illinois.

He then earned a master's degree in the history of religions in 1966 and a PhD in Chinese religion in 1971 from the University of Chicago Divinity School, where he studied with Mircea Eliade, and Joseph Kitagawa among others. When he suggested folk popular sects as a topic for his dissertation, one of his advisers, Professor Ho Ping-ti said that these groups were only rebels and outlaws, but Professor Philip Kuhn encouraged him to pursue these heretics and bandits as a promising topic.

Overmyer then studied in Taiwan at the Inter-University Center for Chinese Language. He later described a turning point while in Taiwan when he discovered that the "heretics and bandits" were in fact popular religious sects much like those found in many parts of the world, including in some forms of Christianity. One evening while attending a scholarly lecture,

from across the street I heard the “tok tok” sound of a small wooden drum accompanying the chanting of scriptures, so I left the lecture room and found a small group of people wearing aqua colored jackets and pants dancing slowly in the street while thumping their chests. They appeared to be in trance; as taxis drove by, they were gently herded to the side by others, all of this in front of a small storefront chapel.

On an altar in the back of this chapel was the image of a female deity, Yaoji jinmu, “The Golden Mother of the Jasper Pond”, whom he recognized as a variant of Wusheng Laomu, “The Eternal Venerable Mother”, the chief deity of the groups he had been studying in traditional written texts.

== Academic career ==
Overmyer's teaching career began in the Department of Religion at Oberlin College, Ohio, in 1970. After three years, he was invited to the University of British Columbia. He was granted tenure in 1977 and taught Chinese religion and philosophy there until he retired in 2001. During that time he held visiting professorships at Princeton University (1983), University of Heidelberg (1993), and The Chinese University of Hong Kong (1996–98).

== Research interests and impact ==
Overmeyer's student Philip Clart wrote that Overmyer's scholarship was unique in its "attention to religion in its less well-known manifestations, religion located along paths less travelled by scholars," that is, the religious life of common people. Clart continues that Overmyer's "methodological choice to study religion as it was and is lived by real people rather than as an abstract system of ideas and doctrines is not limited to the study of popular religions, but has applicability across the sphere of Chinese religious traditions.

Overmyer's first book, Folk Buddhist Religion: Dissenting Sects in Late Traditional China, published by Harvard University Press in 1976, grew out of his doctoral dissertation. Paul Cohen's review of the field book, Discovering History in China says that Overmyer exploits new kinds of sources materials -- sectarian scriptures or "precious scrolls" (baojuan) -- to give a "bottom up" view and access an "interior view" of reality as experienced by participants rather than described by outsiders. Another scholar called the book's subject "the twilight world of the sect". The book was awarded the American Council of Learned Societies Prize in 1979 for "the best first book written by an historian of religions in the last three years."

His next monograph, The Flying Phoenix: Aspects of Chinese Sectarianism in Taiwan (Princeton, 1986), written with David K. Jordan, was followed by survey written for undergraduates and the general public, Religions of China: The World as a Living System (Harper & Row, 1986).

Precious Volumes: an Introduction to Chinese Sectarian Scriptures from the Sixteenth and Seventeenth Centuries (Harvard, 1999) expanded on his insight that texts play a major role in the religious life of commoners, not only the canonical texts of the great traditions. This volume took these texts as its sole focus, arguing for their value as documents of popular religious thought and windows into the religious experience of commoners.

After retiring from teaching in 2001, Overmyer continued to publish. He edited Local Religion in North China in the Twentieth Century: The Structure and Organization of Community Rituals and Beliefs. (E. J. Brill, 2009) and a special issue of The China Quarterly, "Religion in China Today." He was visiting scholar at the Graduate Institute of Religious Studies of National Chengchi University in Taipei, Taiwan, February to July 2002.

Among his students at Oberlin were Randall Nadeau and Stephen F. Teiser, and at British Columbia, Philip Clart and Paul Crowe.

== Personal life ==
He and his wife Estella had two children. He died after a brief bout of cancer in Vancouver, on November 24, 2021, at the age of 86.

== Selected publications ==
=== Books and edited volumes ===
- Folk Buddhist Religion: Dissenting Sects in Late Traditional China. Cambridge, MA, Harvard University Press, June, 1976. Harvard East Asian Series, #83.
- The Flying Phoenix: Aspects of Chinese Sectarianism in Taiwan, by David K. Jordan and Daniel L. Overmyer. Princeton, Princeton University Press, 1986. 329 pages.
- Religions of China: The World as a Living System. San Francisco, Harper & Row, Publishers, March, 1986. “Religious Traditions of the World”. 125 pages. Reprinted with its nine co-volumes in a single volume edited by Byron H. Earhart, Religious Traditions of the World, also by Harper, 1992.
- Chinese translation of Folk Buddhist Religion: Dissenting Sects in Late Traditional China. by Zhou Yumin and others (Dept. of History at the Shanghai Normal University), Zhong-guo min-jian zong-jiao jiao-pai yan-jiu [A study of Chinese folk-religious sects]. Shanghai, Chinese Classics Publishing House, 1993.
- Precious Volumes: An Introduction to Chinese Sectarian Scriptures from the Sixteenth and Seventeenth Centuries, Cambridge, MA, Harvard University Asia Center, 1999. 444 pages. Harvard-Yenching Monograph Series, 49.
- Fei Luan. Chinese translation of the Flying Phoenix, translated by Zhou Yumin, edited by Sung Kuang-yu. Hong Kong : Chinese University of Hong Kong Press, 2005.
- Ethnography in China Today: A Critical Assessment of Methods and Results. Edited, wrote Introduction and one chapter. Taipei, Taiwan, Yuan-liou Publishing Co. Ltd., 2002.
- Interpretations of Hope in Chinese Religions and Christianity, co-edited with Lai Chi Tim. Wrote one chapter. Hong Kong, 2005.
- Special Issue: “Religion in China Today”, The China Quarterly No.174 (June 2003). Edited, introduction. (re-published as Religion in China Today), Cambridge, Cambridge University Press, 2003.
- Chogoku minkan Bukkyo kyoha no kenkyu, Japanese translation of Folk Buddhist Religion book, translated by Rimbara Fumiko and Ito Michiharu. Tokyo, Kenbun shuppan, 2005.
- Edited, Huabei nongcun minjian wenhua yanjiu (Collection of studies of popular culture in north China villages), co-edited with Fan Lizhu and others, Tianjin: Tianjin guji chubanshe, 2006–2007.
- Local Religion in North China in the Twentieth Century: The Structure and Organization of Community Rituals and Beliefs. Leiden: Brill, 2009.
- Asian Religions in British Columbia, co-edited with Don Baker and Larry DeVries. Twelve reports by B.C. local scholars. Vancouver, B.C., University of British Columbia Press, 2010.
- “Special Issue, Women in Chinese Religions”, Min-su ch’u-i (Journal of Chinese Ritual, Theatre and Folklore), No. 168, June 2010, edited and wrote the Introduction.
- ——— (2016), My Life as I Remember It (PDF), Asian Studies, University of British Columbia
