= Role ethics =

Ethical theory based on family roles

Role ethics is an ethical theory based on family roles. Morality is derived from a person's relationship with their community. The ethics of Confucianism is an example of role ethics, in particular the Three Fundamental Bonds and Five Constant Virtues (Chinese: 三綱五常; pinyin: Sāngāng Wǔcháng; Jyutping: Saam1 Gong1 Ng5 Soeng4; Pe̍h-ōe-jī: Sam-kòng Ngó͘-siông).

== Confucianism ==
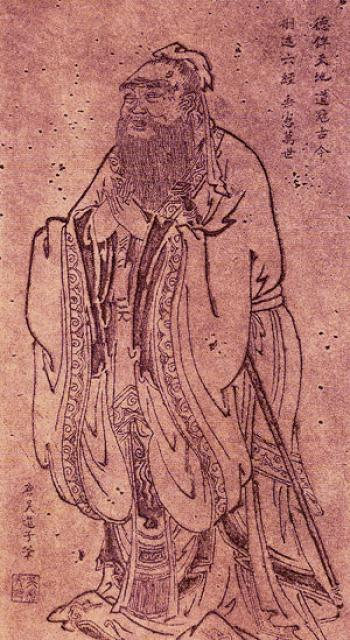
Tang Dynasty depiction of Confucius

Confucian role ethics centers around filial piety or xiao, a respect for family members. The concept is elaborated in the Confucian text Classic of Filial Piety: "In serving his parents, a filial son reveres them in daily life; he makes them happy while he nourishes them; he takes anxious care of them in sickness; he shows great sorrow over their death; and he sacrifices to them with solemnity." Filial duty requires the desire to be filial, and not just the act of filial piety. In Confucian societies, filial piety determines the "moral worth" of an individual in a community and acts as a form of social capital.

According to Roger T. Ames and Henry Rosemont, "Confucian normativity is defined by living one's family roles to maximum effect." In Confucian role ethics, morality is based on a person's fulfillment of a role, such as that of a parent or a child. These roles are established as relationships, and are not individualistic. Confucian roles are not rational, and originate through the xin, or human emotions.

The concept of li or ritual propriety is crucial to Confucian roles. Propriety reinforces family relationships, and binds together the community. The performance of li expresses a person's moral commitment as a human being.

In Japan, modern Confucian scholars like Uno Tetsuto and Ichimura Sanjiro have attempted to mix Confucian role ethics with concepts such as democracy and human rights.

== Stoicism ==
Epictetus developed and introduced role ethics into Stoicism, an approach to ethics based on taking seriously the different roles we all play in life. The roles are:

- the general role of a human being in society (the human cosmopolis) at large;
- roles that we choose for ourselves, being a father, or friend;
- roles that the circumstances assign to us, being a son or daughter.

Epictetus's role ethics was a development of a similar concept developed by Panaetius who was a philosopher of the middle Stoa.
