= Journal of Chinese Religions =

- Discipline: Chinese religions, Sinology
- Language: English
- Edited by: Philip Clart

Publication details
- Former names: Society for the Study of Chinese Religions Bulletin, Taoist Resources
- History: 1973-present
- Publisher: Johns Hopkins University Press on behalf of the Society for the Study of Chinese Religions (United States)
- Frequency: Semi-annual

Standard abbreviations
- ISO 4: J. Chin. Relig.

Indexing
- ISSN: 0737-769X
- LCCN: 83642745
- OCLC no.: 56018524

Links
- Journal homepage

The Journal of Chinese Religions (JCR) is a leading specialist journal in the field of Chinese religions. From 1975 to 1982, it was known as Society for the Study of Chinese Religions Bulletin. Since its founding, JCR has provided a forum for studies in Chinese religions from a great variety of disciplinary perspectives, including religious studies, philology, history, art history, anthropology, sociology, political science, archaeology, and literary studies.

== Abstracting and indexing ==
JCR is abstracted and indexed in the Bibliography of Asian Studies, EBSCOhost, Emerging Sources Citation Index, ProQuest, and Scopus.
