= David K. Jordan =

American academic (born 1942)

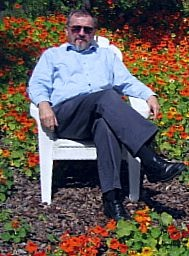
- Born: 1942 (age 83–84); Chicago, Illinois
- Education: University of Chicago, Stanford University
- Known for: Anthropology, Chinese studies, psycholinguistics, religion
- Scientific career
- Fields: Anthropology, Chinese studies, sociolinguistics
- Workplaces: University of California, San Diego, Harvard University
- Doctoral advisor: Nur Yalman (Harvard University)

David K. Jordan (born 1942) is an American anthropologist, educator, and academic administrator. He is a professor emeritus at the University of California, San Diego, since 2004. Jordan is known for his various service posts to the university. These positions include the chair for the department of anthropology, the director for the program of Chinese studies, provost of Earl Warren College, interim provost of Sixth College, as well as one of the founders of the UCSD department of anthropology with psychological anthropologist Melford Spiro. Jordan participated in the university Academic Senate committees including the UCSD Graduate Council and the Council of Provosts.

== Early life ==
Jordan was born in 1942 in Chicago, Illinois to Dorothy F. Jordan and Earnest K. Jordan. Jordan spent most of his childhood in the United States.

He received his Ph.D. from University of Chicago in 1969.

== Anthropology career ==
=== Overview ===
His academic interests center in cultural and psychological anthropology, sociolinguistics, and the cross-cultural study of religion. Regional interests focus on Chinese society, especially in Taiwan, with a secondary interest in pre-Columbian Mexico.

Jordan has published on language, social structure, folk religion, and sectarianism in Taiwan and China and has written in and about Esperanto and the social movements associated with it and the associated area of interlinguistics.

Jordan is a researcher in Chinese anthropology as well as Ethnographic Christianity research. Even after retirement, Jordan continued to work at the university with his last post as the Interim Provost of Sixth College. Jordan continues to teach both undergraduate and graduate courses at his home institution in the Departments of Anthropology as well as Eleanor Roosevelt College's "Making of the Modern World" sequence.

=== Chinese anthropology ===
Jordan's research focused on Chinese Popular Religion, and Traditional Chinese Culture. Jordan also teaches and founded these courses in the Department of Anthropology at University of California, San Diego.

=== Chinese studies ===
Jordan was one of the founders of the Chinese Studies Program at UC San Diego, where he served as the Program Director and still remains as an affiliated faculty. He also created a very large database on Chinese culture and society with an emphasis on an anthropological view on his personal website which includes detailed contents on almost all aspects of the traditional Chinese life.

Jordan's research in Chinese Studies focused on an ethnographic study in Taiwan, in which he produced a general integrated picture of rural Taiwanese religious life for the first time in English. He also produced ethnographically based accounts of Chinese sworn siblinghood and traditional matchmaking, long-term Chinese traditions that had had little ethnographic study.

Jordan is also known for his research on the topic of Chinese Ghost Marriage.

=== Ethnographic Christianity ===
Jordan also did much research in the field of Ethnographic Christianity. He teaches the course to the Ph.D. students at UC San Diego in preparation for these students' field work in Christianized portions of the world. His research in this field include:

- Christianity as a Religious Organization
- The Historical Jesus
- The Early Church
- The Mythological Traditions
- Historical & Ethnographic Variations: (General Histories, Comparative Studies, Asia, Latin America, Anglophone America, Africa, Europe)
- The "Scientific Study" of Religion

== Visiting professorships ==
Jordan was a visiting professor at Harvard University in the summer of 1974 and at San Francisco State University several summers. He was also a visiting faculty at the University of Washington for one term in 1991 as well as a visiting faculty at the Hong Kong University of Science & Technology in Spring of 2007.

== Invited plenary lectures ==
Jordan is consistently invited to deliver guest lectures on an international basis. In the past, he has delivered invited lectures at Sun Yat-Sen University in Guangzhou, China in 2007, and was the keynote speaker at the 2001 Pacific Neighborhood Conference in Hong Kong.

== Awards and honors ==
Jordan has won multiple awards throughout his career, the most recent one is the UCSD Alumni Excellence in Teaching Award 2008 by the UCSD Alumni Association. He is also a member of the Society for Medical Anthropology.

== Bibliography ==
- 2004 Minor Arts of Daily Life: Popular Culture in Taiwan. Honolulu: University of Hawai'i Press. (Edited with Andrew D. Morris and Marc L. Moskowitz.)
- 1986 The Flying Phoenix: Aspects of Sectarianism in Taiwan. Princeton: Princeton University Press. (With Daniel L. Overmyer)
- 1972 Gods, Ghosts, and Ancestors: The Folk Religion of a Taiwanese Village. Berkeley: University of California Press.
- 1990 Personality and the Cultural Construction of Society: Papers in Honor of Melford E. Spiro. Tuscaloosa: University of Alabama Press.(Edited with Marc J. Swartz.)
- 1976 Anthropology: Perspective on Humanity. New York: Wiley. (With Marc J. Swartz.)
- 1999 Being Colloquial in Esperanto: A Reference Guide. El Cerrito: Esperanto League for North America.
- 1996 Rakontoj prapatraj pri nia lando antau multaj jarcentoj kiam okazemis mirindaj aferoj
