= Mount Baoding Buddhist Sculptures =

Buddhist site in Chongqing, China

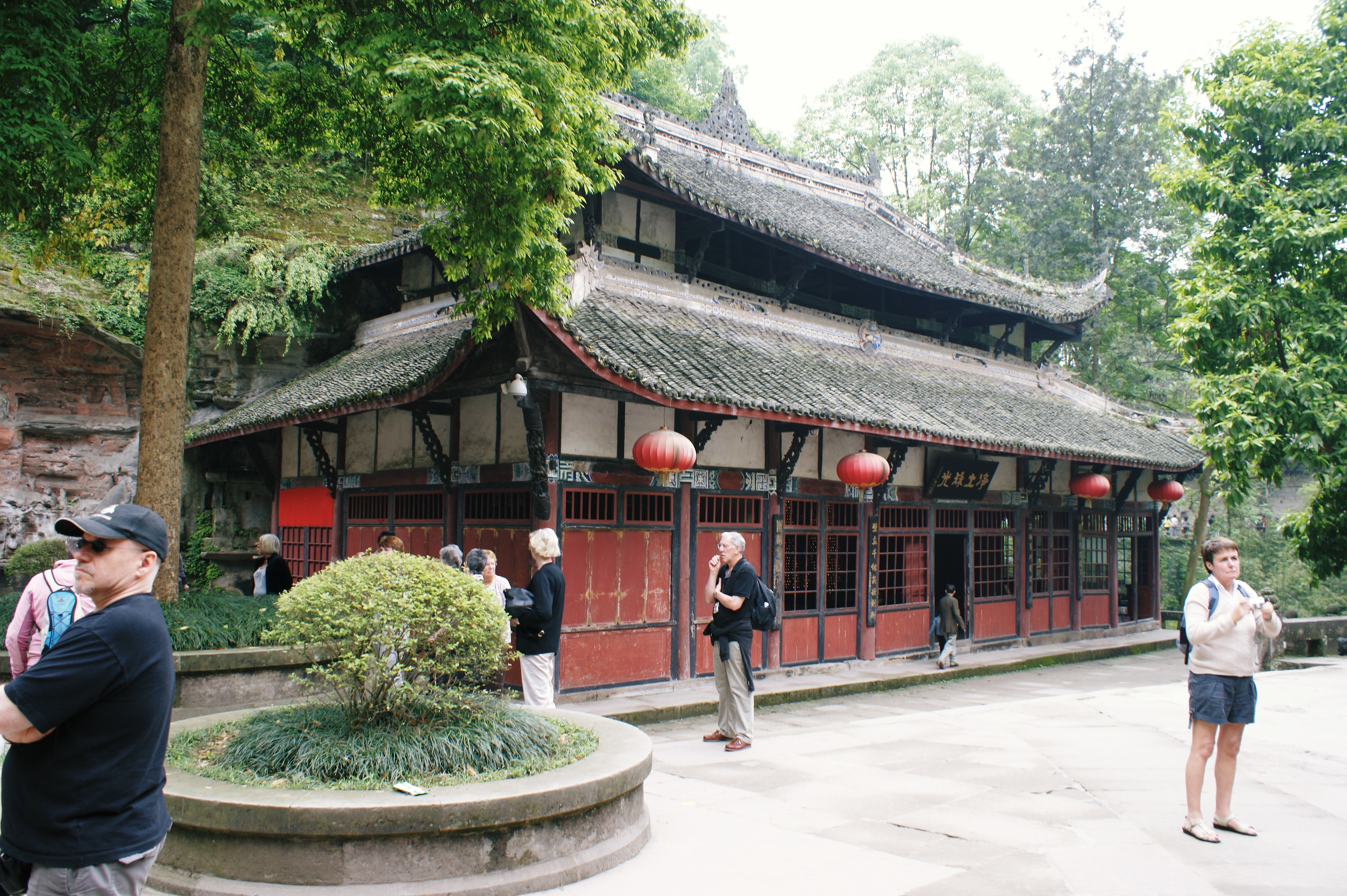
Longevity Pavilion at the Baodingshan Cliff Carvings.

Baodingshan (simplified Chinese: 宝顶山; traditional Chinese: 寶頂山; also known as Mount Baoding, Precious Summit Mountain, and Summit of Treasures) is a Buddhist site in Chongqing. The site is located on a limestone outcropping at an elevation of 500 meters, fifteen kilometers north of the center of Dazu District, a market town that dates to 758 CE and the city is ringed by religious sites dating from 892 to 1249 CE. Primary construction at Baodingshan took place during the Southern Song dynasty (1127–1279 CE) but it remained largely unknown to the outside world until its reopening to the public in the 1980s, the earliest documented research on the site dating to 1944. The site has since been designated a World Heritage Site since 1999, falling within the collective grouping of Dazu Rock Carvings, a reference to the district in which Baodingshan is located. Dazu County covers 1400 square kilometers northwest of Chongqing on the road to Chengdu. During the Song dynasty (960–1279 CE), this area of the Chengdu plain was considered one of the wealthiest regions in China.

== Description ==
Consisting of a mile and a half of carvings, numbering over 6000 total, Baodingshan is an atypical Chinese Buddhist site for a variety of reasons: it includes both large scale iconic works as well as intricate narrative tableaux; it represents a variety of Buddhist schools of thought – Huayan, Chan, Pure Land, and Esoteric; it has copious amounts of Buddhist texts carved in conjunction with imagery; and it was constructed within 70 years under the supervision of one man, Zhao Zhifeng. Baodingshan consists of two main parts joined by a temple, Shengshousi [Sagacious Longevity Temple 圣寿寺 / 聖壽寺]. Best known to the outside world is Great Buddha Bend [Dafowan 大佛弯 / 大佛彎] due to its impressive collection of 31 tableaux featuring imagery such as the parinirvana of the historical Buddha, the hells scenes, the Peacock Queen and numerous other narrative tableaux, the most widely reproduced being the Taming the Wild Ox. Great Buddha Bend also claims some of the biggest Chinese versions of certain Buddhist works – in particular the Hell tableau and the 1000-Armed 1000-Eyed Avalokitesvara or Guanyin figure. This area of Baodingshan follows the natural contours of the landscape, a rocky semi-circle formed by the nearby river. At Great Buddha Bend, the carved works flow from one tableau into another—large, deeply cut reliefs reaching dimensions as great as 26 feet high by 66 feet wide. Visitors encounter an uninterrupted series of carvings totaling 30 connected tableaux punctuated by two caves, giving the illusion of a handscroll. Several authors have even likened Baodingshan’s Great Buddha Bend to “an illustrated storybook." The most obvious difference between Great Buddha Bend and other Chinese cave sites is the lack of caves, or even cave-like niches, in which the statues would normally be positioned. Caves at Buddhist sites such as Dunhuang and Yungang were seen as a necessary part of the religious process. They were places where the worshipper entered into a “Buddha-world” and performed rites of circumambulation or made offerings to an icon.

The other area of Baodingshan is Little Buddha Bend [Xiaofowan 小佛弯 / 小佛彎], a smaller area situated above and behind the temple where some scholars have argued initiation rituals were carried out. It is within Little Buddha Bend that one finds the Founder’s Pagoda, a carved work on which is seen images of the Tang dynasty local layman Master Liu – famous for his ten austerities that are depicted at Baodingshan as well as at other sites in Sichuan – as well as an image of Zhao Zhifeng, the monk credited with Baodingshan’s creation. Equally important is the inclusion of a carved Buddhist scriptural catalogue on the lower levels of the pagoda, with some scholars noting that the catalogue’s presence points to perhaps a different function for the text seen at the site as a whole. Other areas of Baodingshan include the Vimalakirti Hall, situated at the pinnacle of the summit, and the Longevity Pavilion located just above the Oxherding sequence of texts and images in Great Buddha Bend.

Baodingshan has seen considerable growth in the last decade, with a new highway being built to Dazu from Chongqing to speed up access and new buildings and roads being constructed at Baodingshan itself. Scholarship on the site has also increased, from only minimal treatment of the site by Chinese scholars in the form of archaeological assessment being done up until the 1980s to volumes of essays being published annually. Early Western language work by H. Sorensen, A. Howard and K. Kucera has since been augmented by increasing interest among foreign scholars brought on by Baodingshan’s movement onto the global stage and its subsequent acquisition of World Heritage status. The Dazu Academy of Rock Carvings now holds an international conference every five years to commemorate that landmark bringing together scholars from all over the world, the last of which was held in fall 2014.

== Gallery ==
Baodingshan

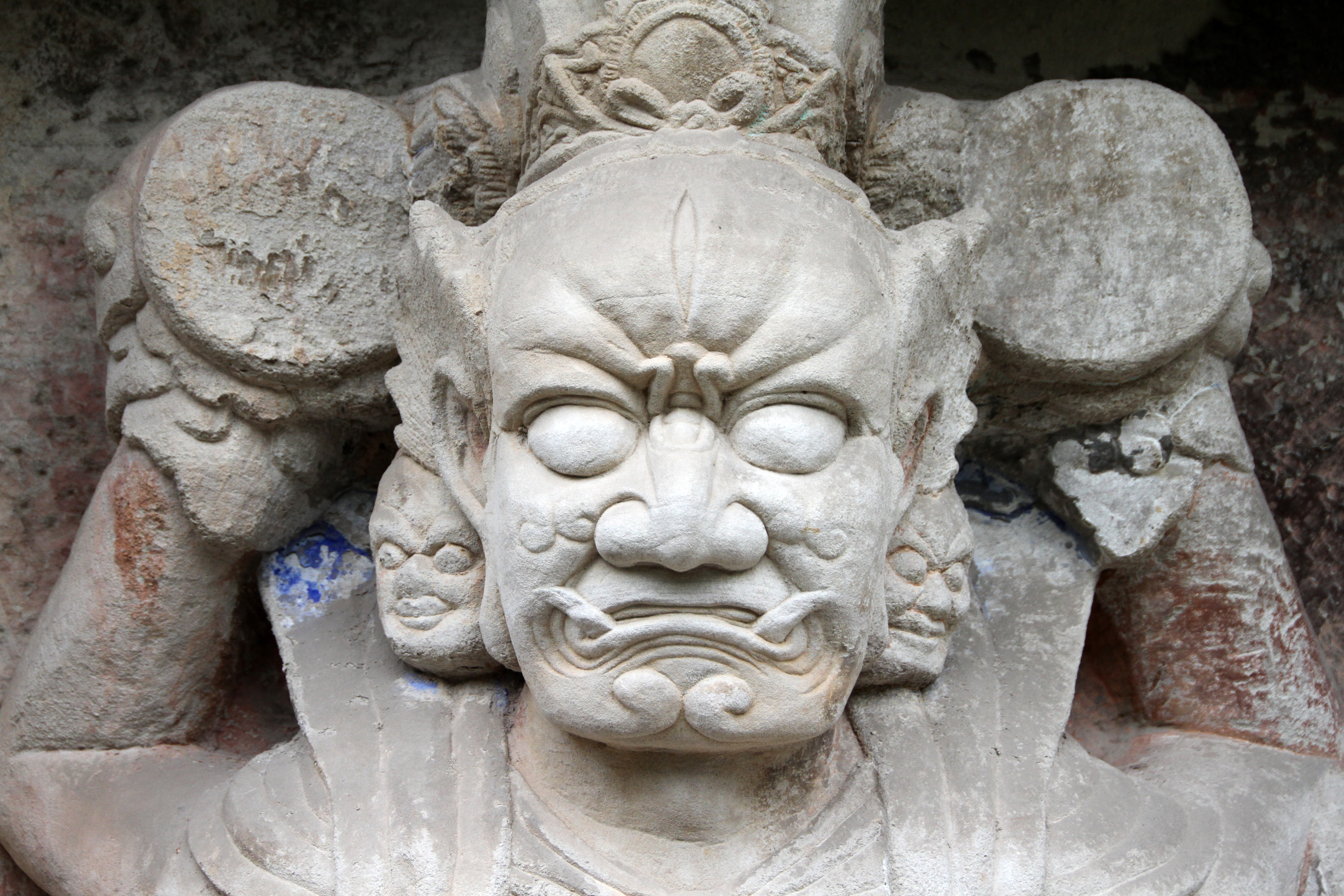

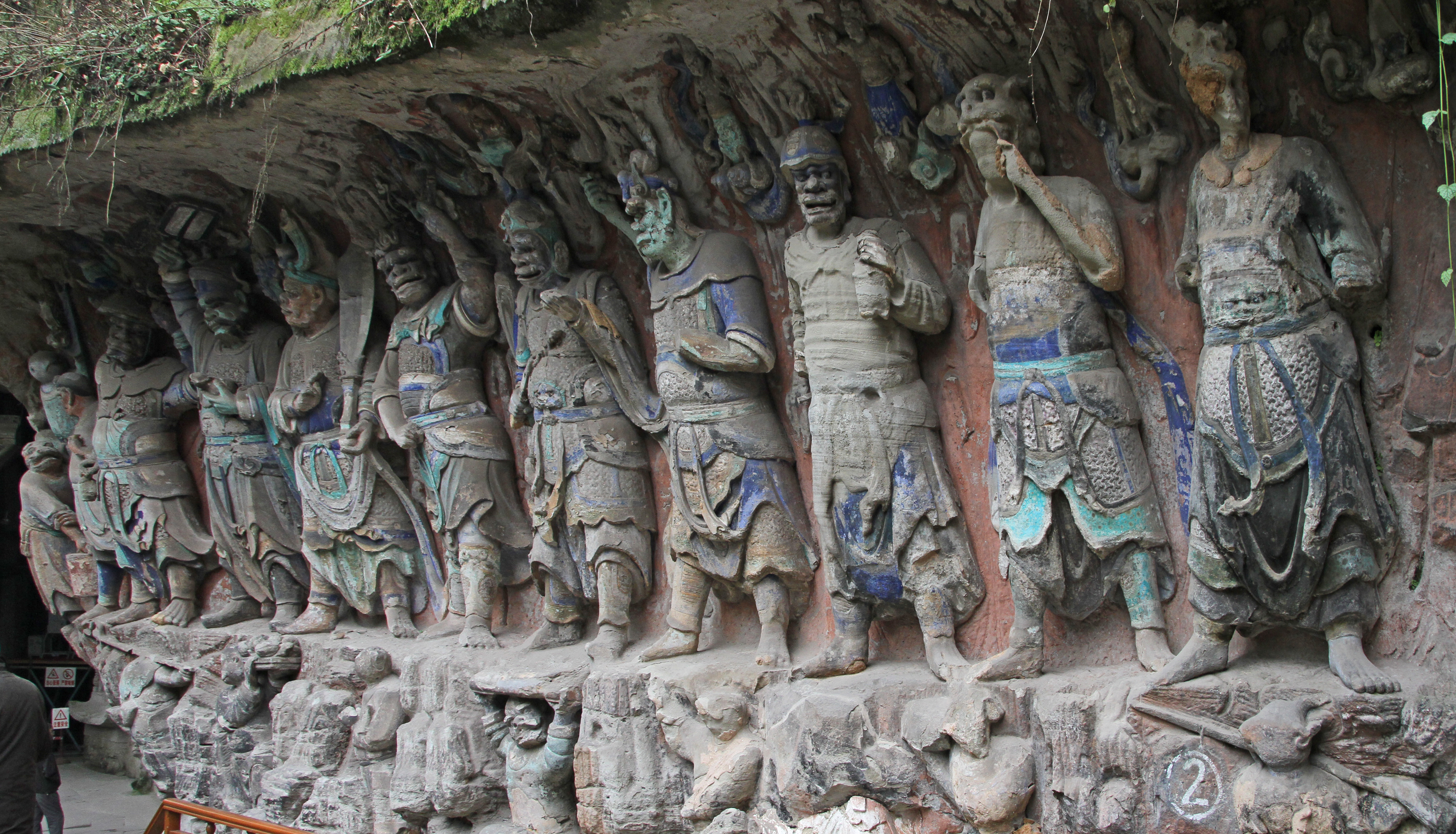

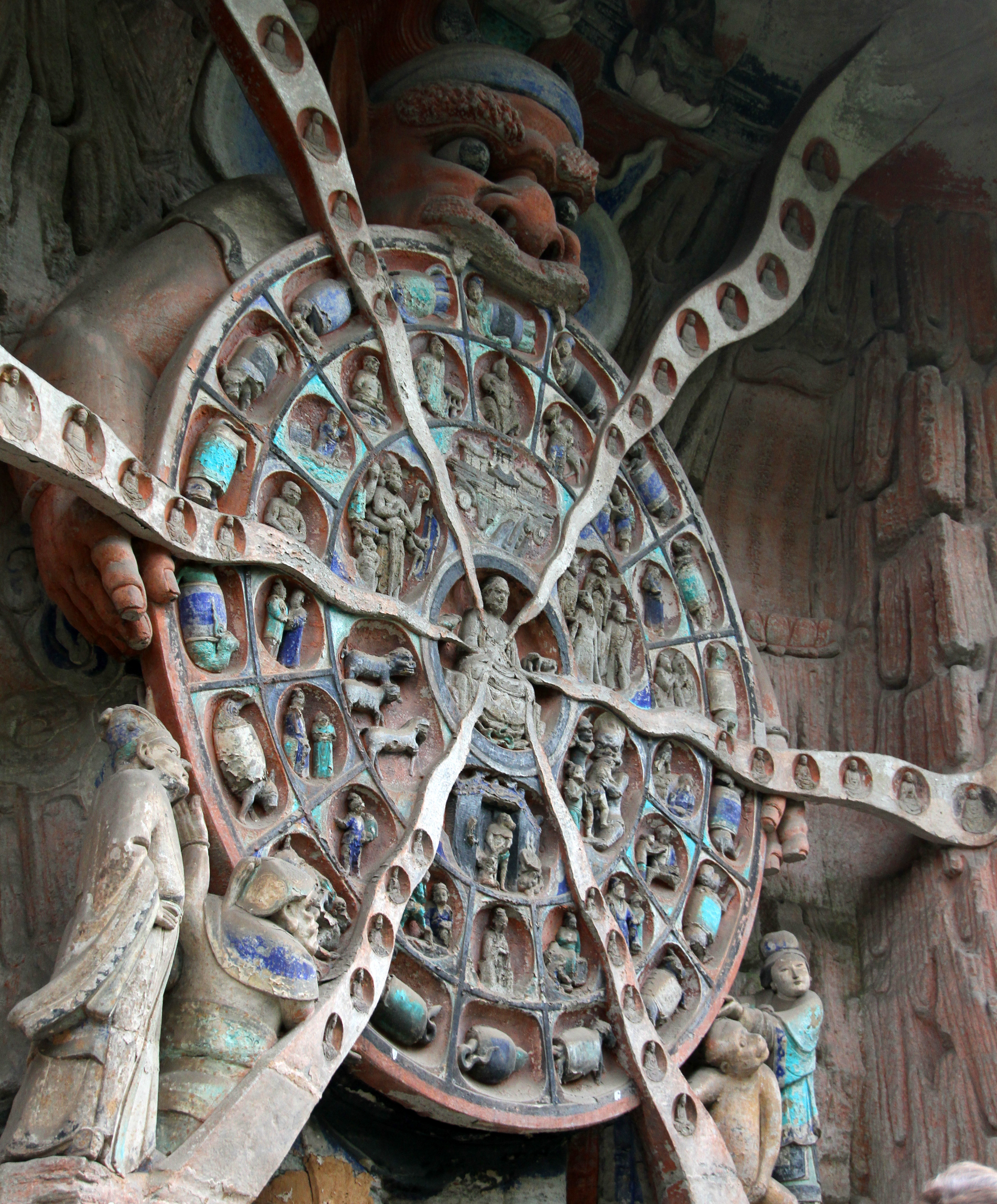

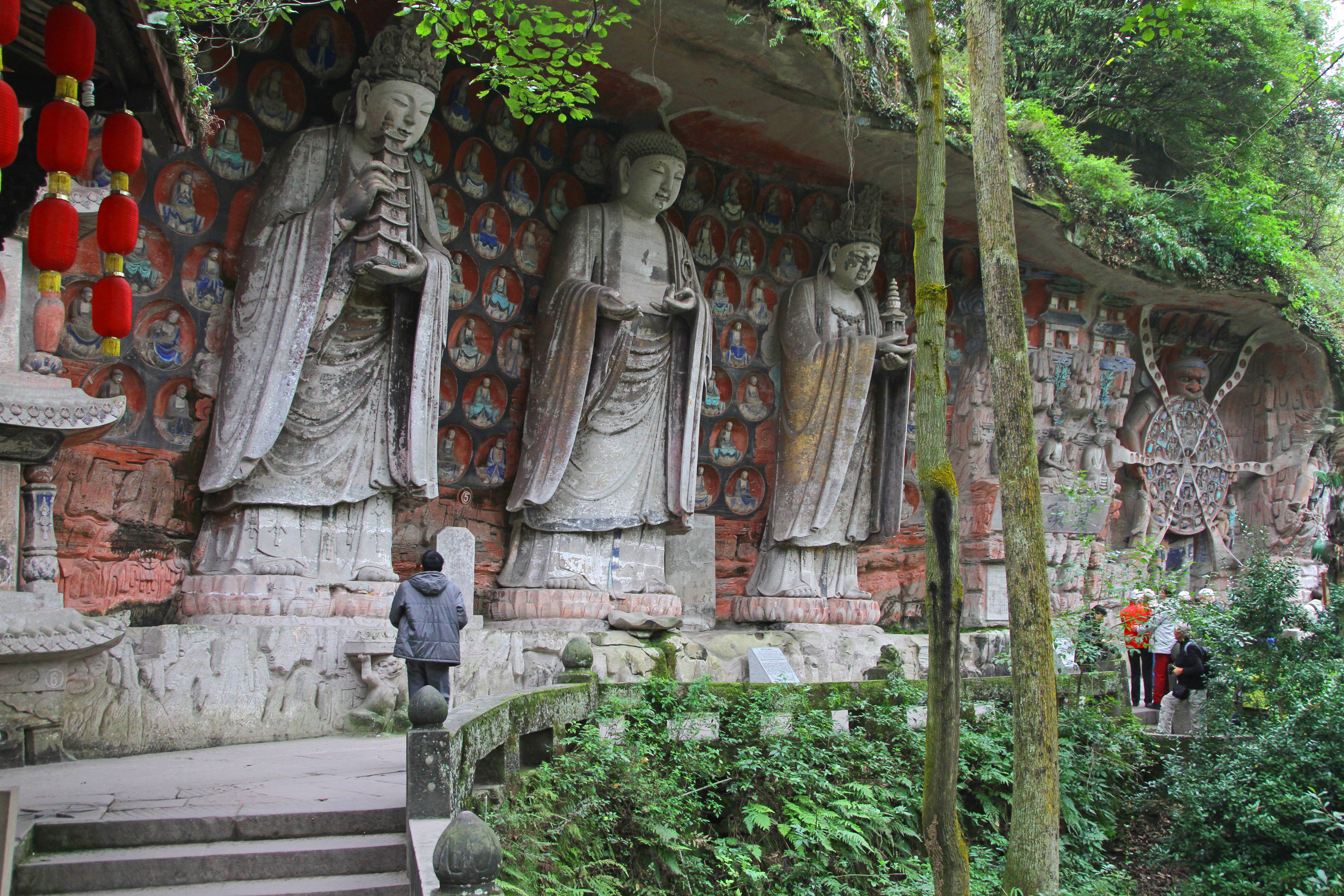

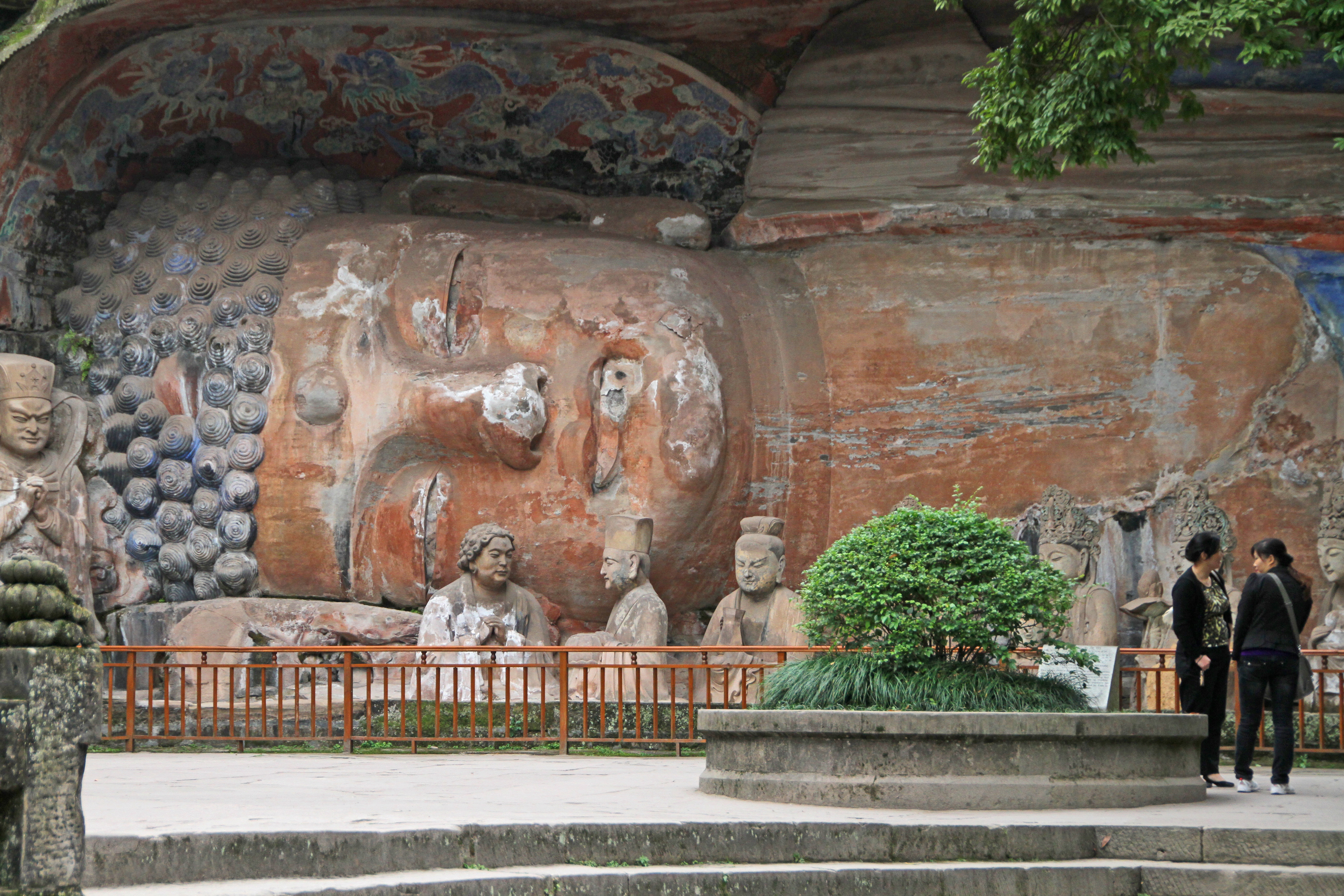

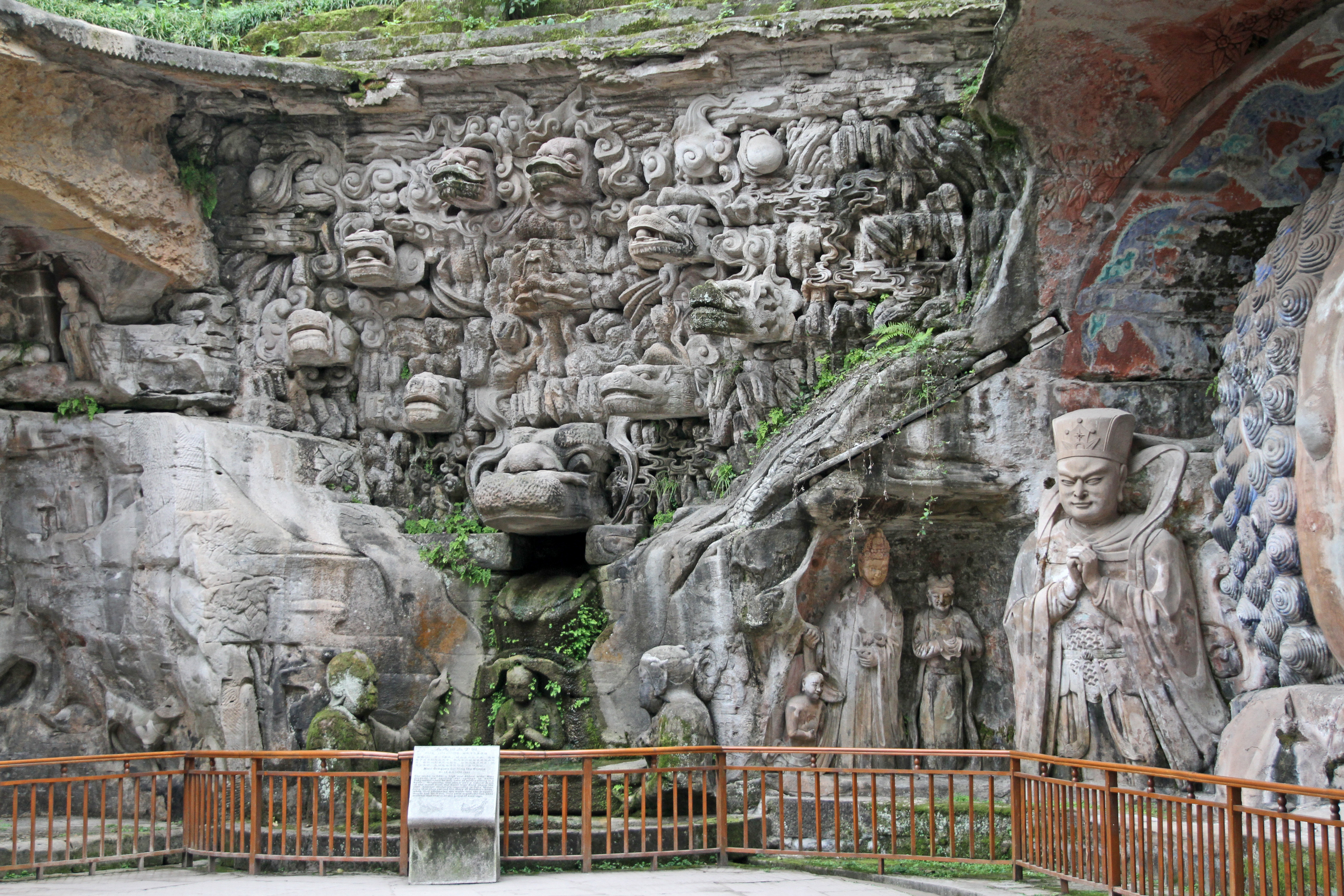

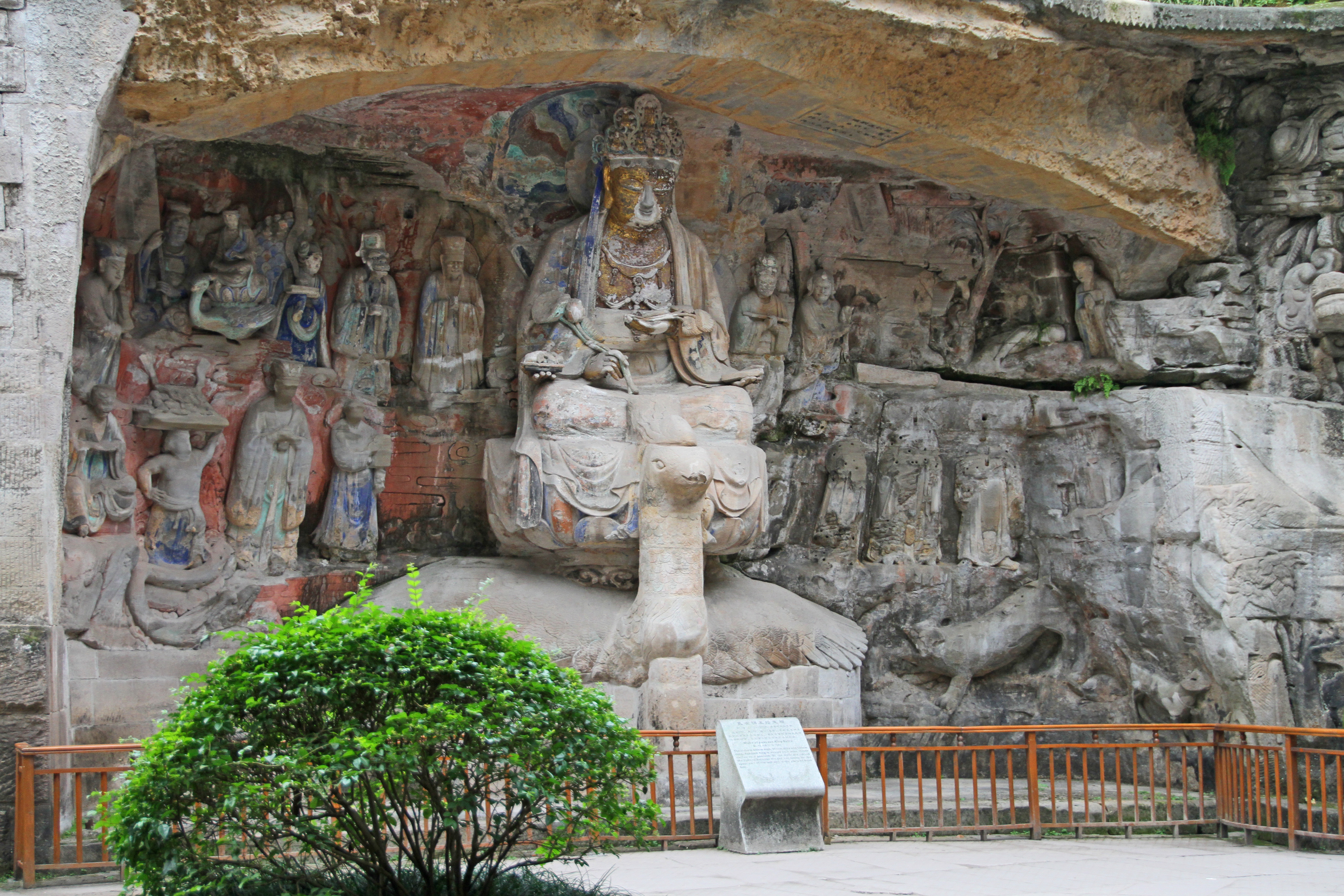

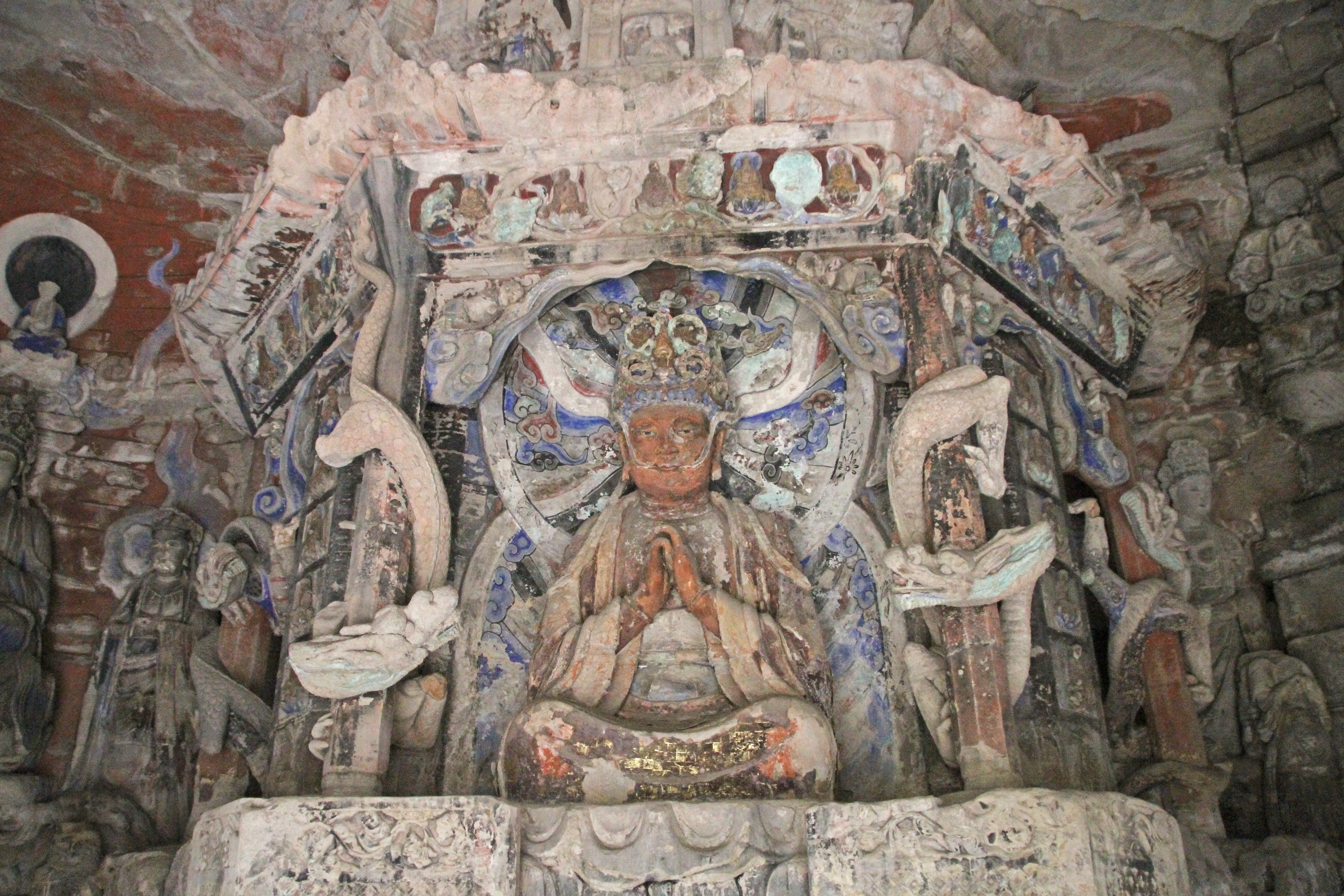

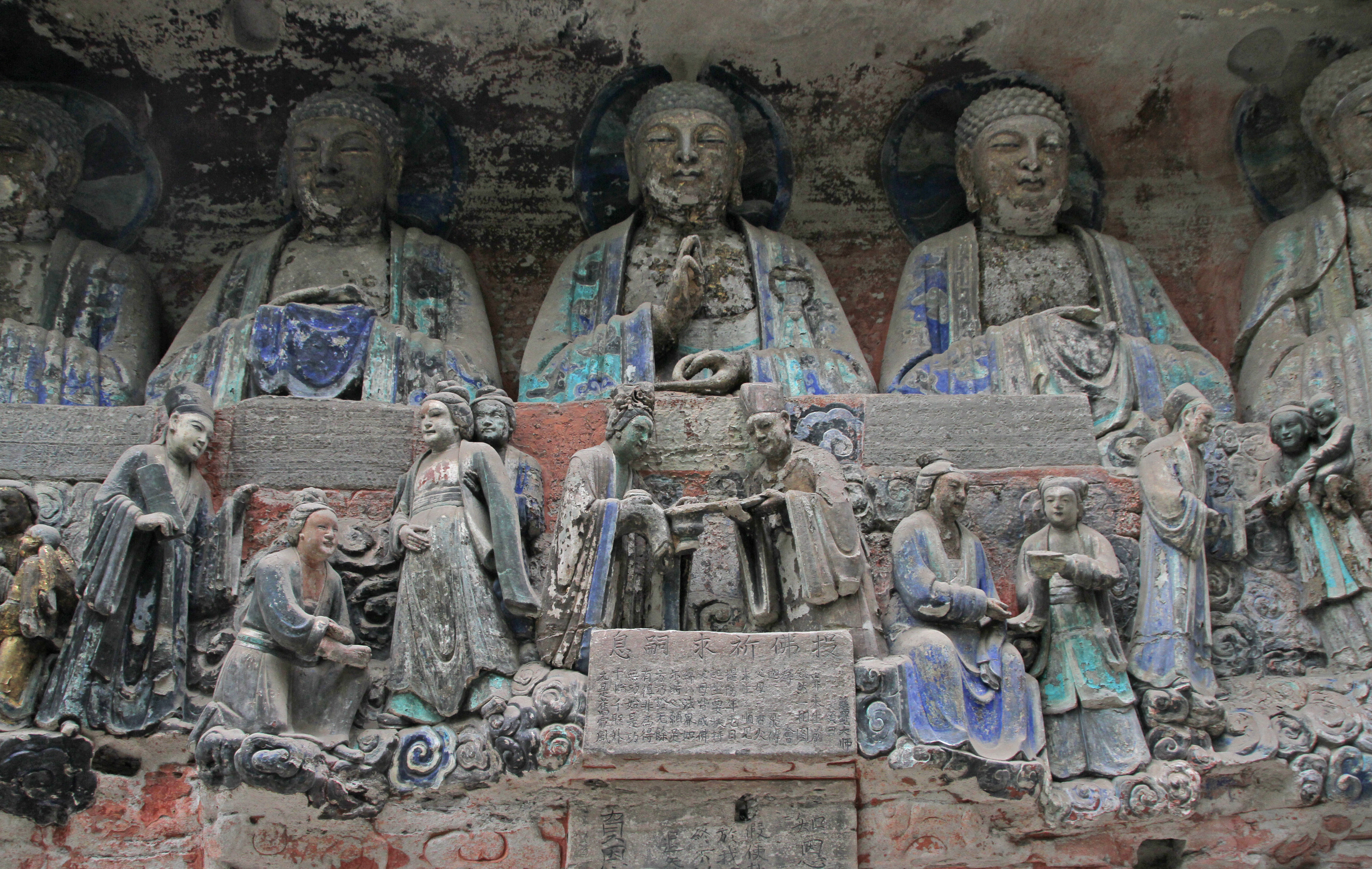

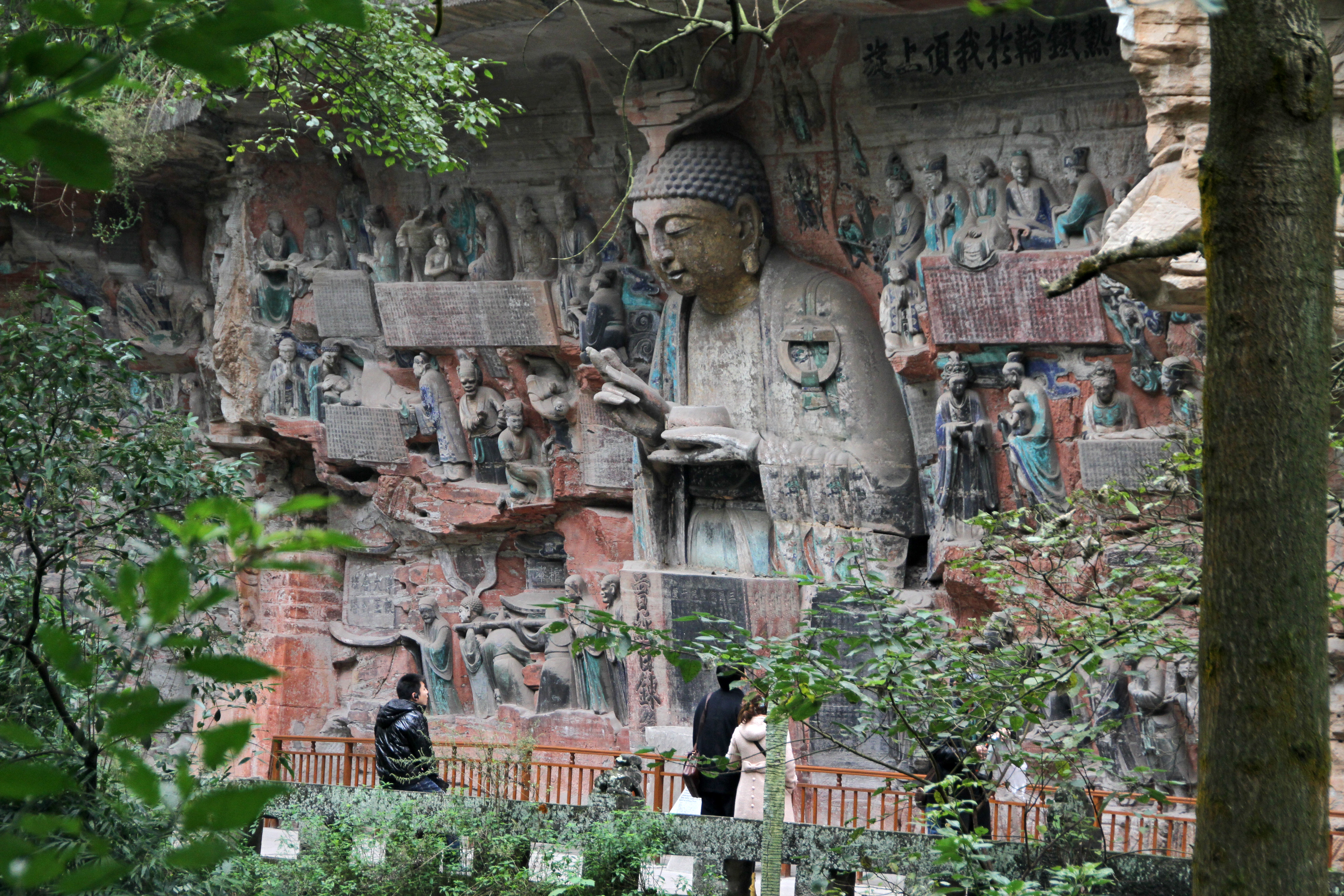

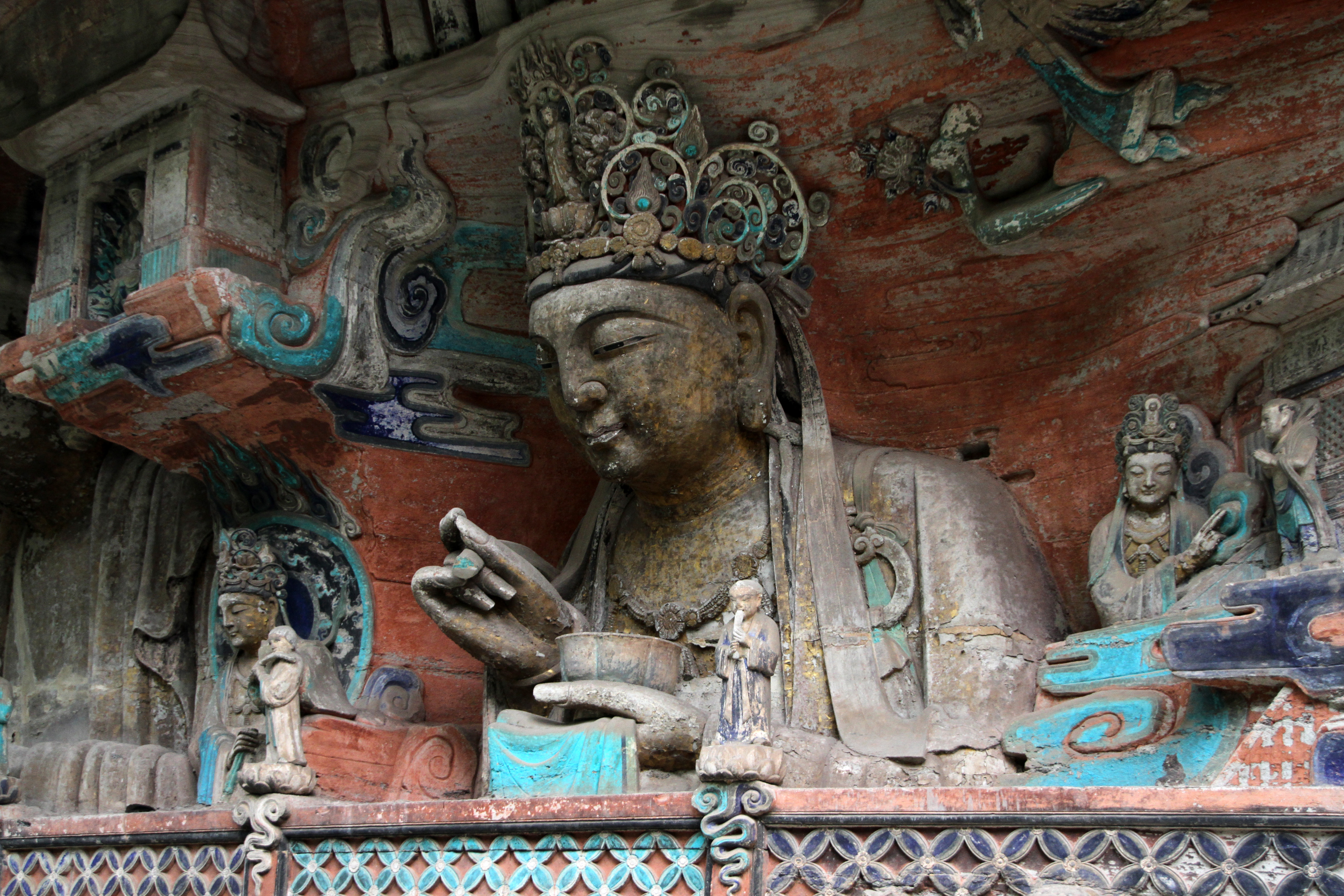

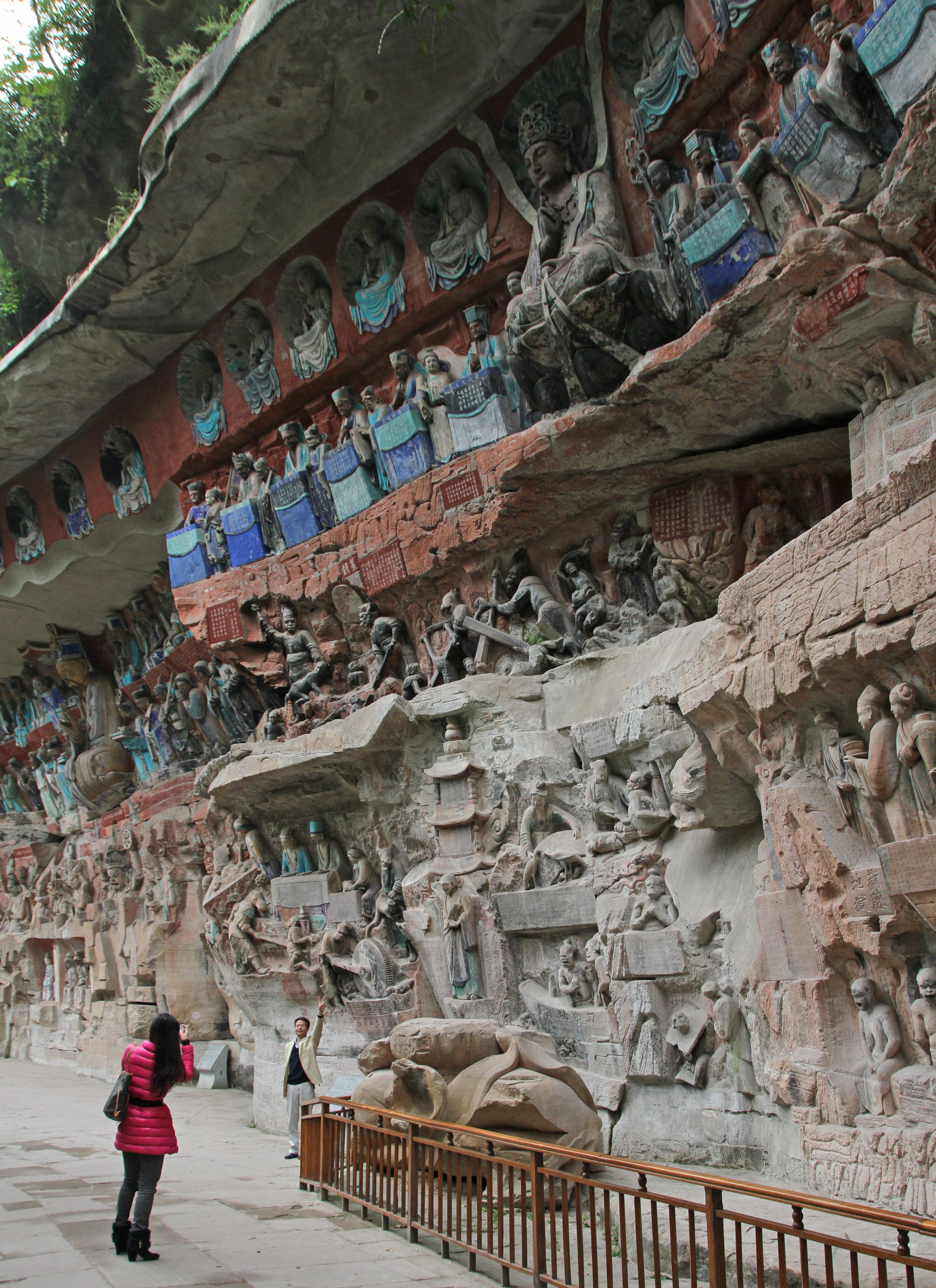

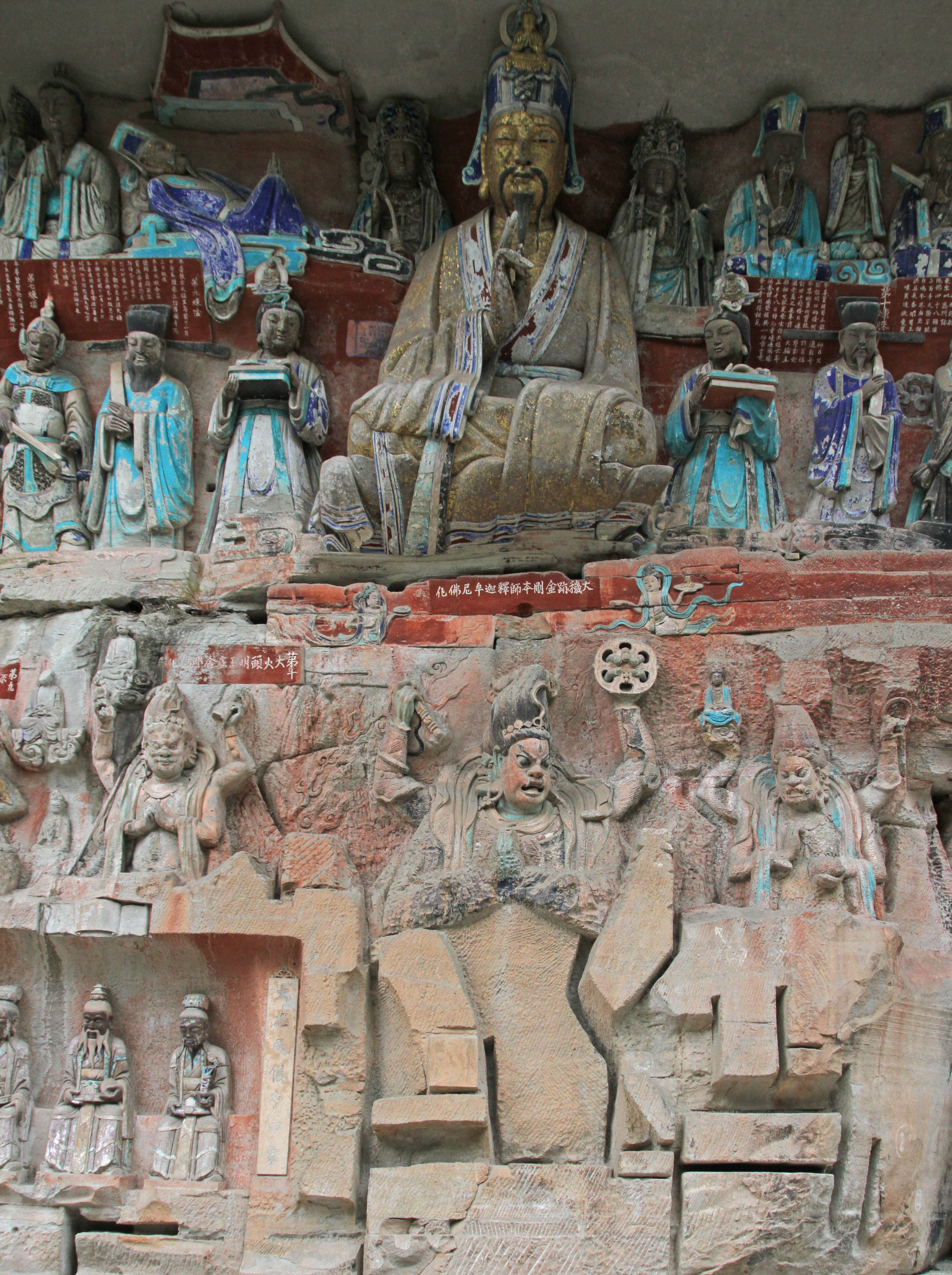

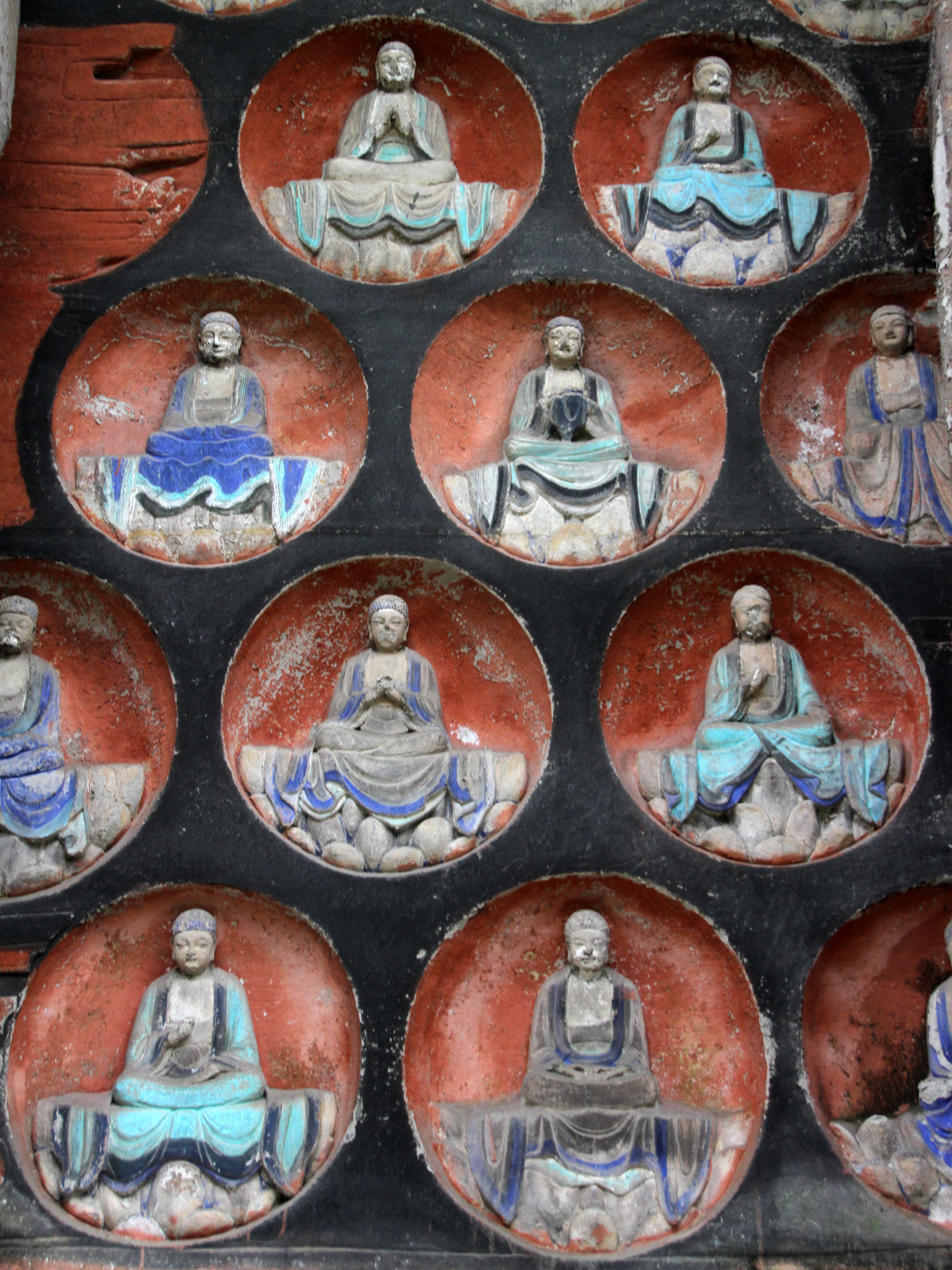

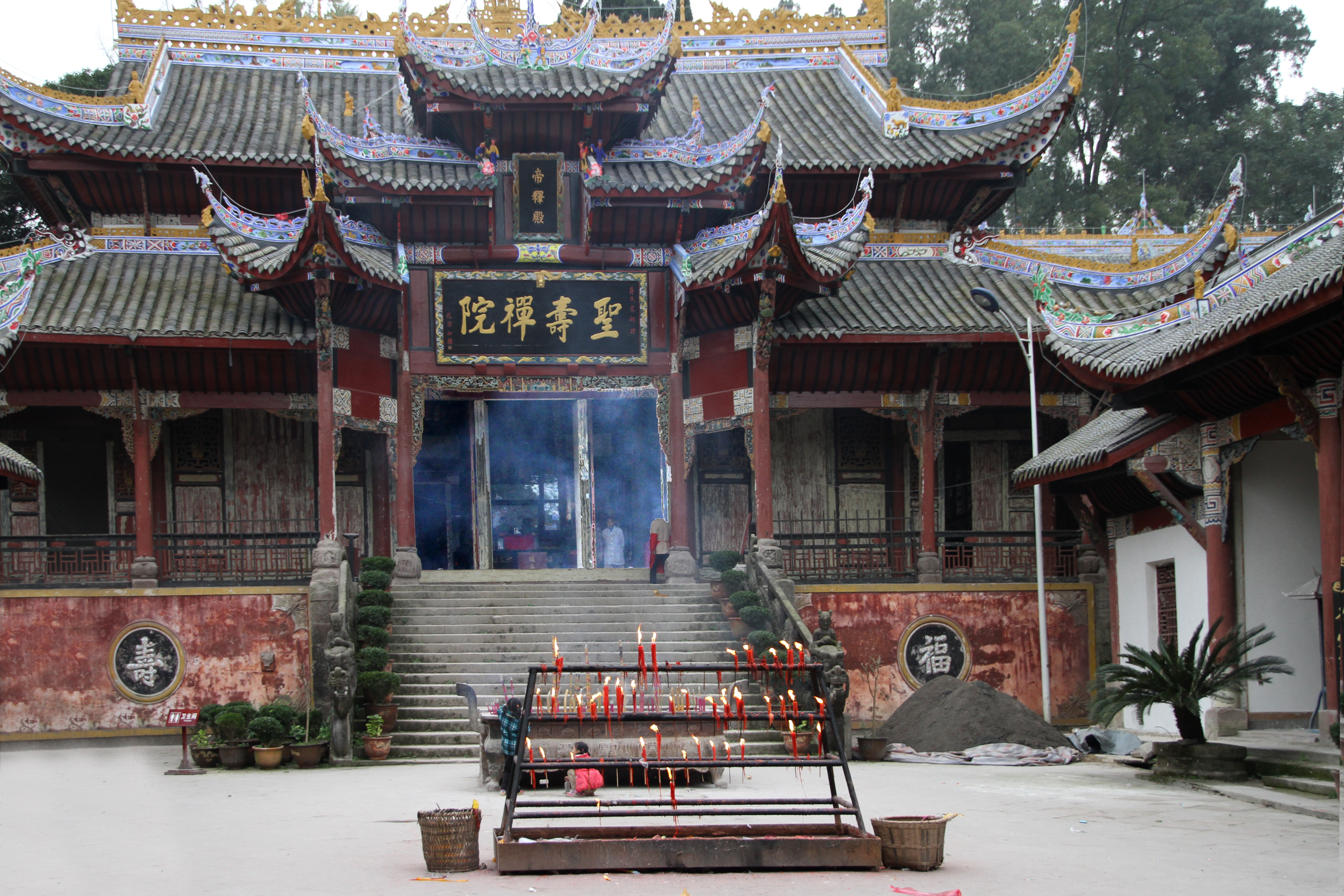
