= Gregory Schopen =

American scholar Buddhist studies

Gregory Schopen is Professor of Buddhist Studies at University of California, Los Angeles. He received his B.A. majoring in American literature from Black Hills State College, M.A. in history of religions from McMaster University in Ontario, Canada, and Ph.D. in South Asian and Buddhist studies from the Australian National University in Canberra. His Ph.D thesis is titled "Bhaisajyaguru-sutra and the Buddhism of Gilgit."

== Awards ==
- 1985 MacArthur Fellows Program

== Works ==
- Bones, stones, and Buddhist monks: collected papers on the archaeology, epigraphy, and texts of monastic Buddhism in India, University of Hawaii Press, 1997, ISBN 978-0-8248-1870-8
- Buddhist monks and business matters: still more papers on monastic Buddhism in India, University of Hawaii Press, 2004, ISBN 978-0-8248-2774-8
- Figments and fragments of Mahāyāna Buddhism in India: more collected papers, University of Hawaii Press, 2005, ISBN 978-0-8248-2548-5
- Buddhist Nuns, Monks, and Other Worldly Matters: Recent Papers on Monastic Buddhism in India, University of Hawaii Press, 2014, ISBN 978-0-8248-3881-2
