= Syama Jataka =

Buddhist tale of a former life of the Buddha

Translations of Syama Jataka
- Sanskrit: śyāma jataka
- Pali: Suvaṇṇa Sāma Jātaka
- Burmese: သုဝဏ္ဏသာမဇာတ်
- Khmer: សុវណ្ណសាមជាតក; Sovannasam Cheadok
- Thai: สุวรรณสามชาดก; RTGS: Suwannasam Chadok

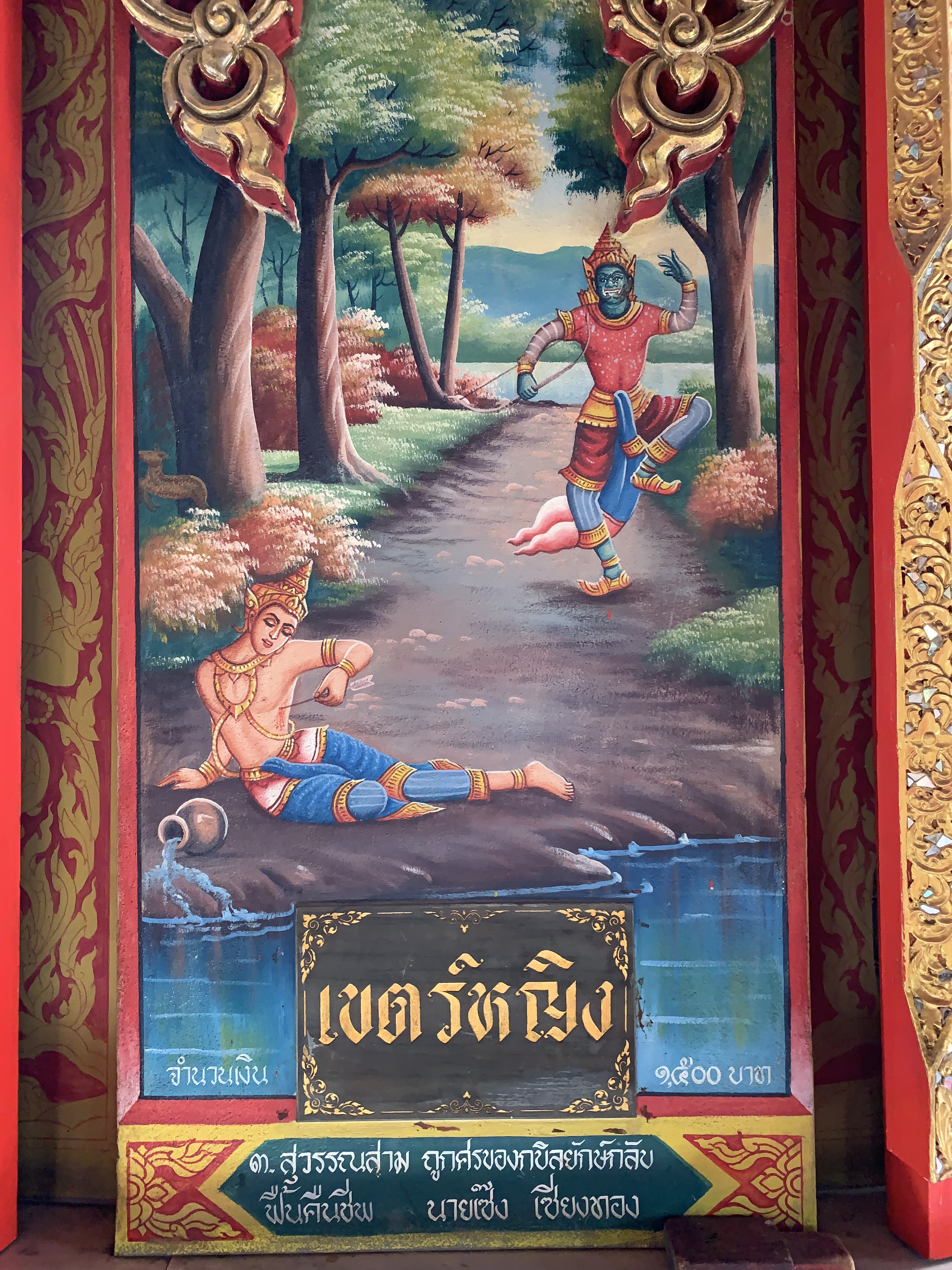
Mural at Wat Chomphu Wek, Thailand depicting the scene as Syama got shot with an arrow.

The Syama Jataka (sanskrit: śyāma), also known as Sāma Jataka or more popularly as Suvaṇṇa-sāma Jataka( "Golden-complexioned Boy") in Pali, is the third of the Jataka tales in the collection of Ten Jataka or Mahanipata Jataka, which tell of the last ten lives of the Buddha prior to the life in which he achieves enlightenment. The Syama Jataka tells the story of the Bodhisattva who descends to earth to be born as the child of two pious hermits. As a young man, Sovannasam becomes a hermit as well, and then dedicates himself to the care of his parents who have been blinded in an example of filial piety. Followers of Buddhism believe that the Buddha told the story in a sermon at Wat Chetapun (Jetavana) to explain the virtues of Sovannasam's conduct to a monk who was uncertain whether it was appropriate for a monk to take care of his parents.

Dukūlaka is identified with Kassapa, Pārikā with Bhaddā Kāpilānī, Piliyakkha with Ananda, Sakka with Anuruddha, and Bahusodarī with Uppalavannā.

== Similarity to Shravana story in the epic Ramayana ==
The story of Suvarna Syama (Suvaṇṇa-sāma) is very similar to the story of Shravana in the Sanskrit epic Ramayana. Shravana's tale is about a pious son taking care of his blind parents, who gets killed while fetching water by a hunting king. But the endings are different, in Shravana's story, the king gets cursed by the blind parents who lost their son and serves as a backstory for the cause of the king's son Rama's exile and his journey, the epic poem Ramayana, whereas in Syama's story there is Indra's intervention, revival of Syama and restoration of his parent' sight. There is no definitive scholarly evidence on whether the Jataka inspired the story in the Ramayana or the other way around. It is possible that they both drew from existing pool of itinerant folkloric tradition that glorified virtues towards one's parents.

== Iconography ==
=== Narrative ===
The single scene from the Sovannasam Cheadok most often represented, both in new temple paintings and in temple paintings dating to the early 20th century, is the scene in which Sovannasam goes to draw water for his parents and is mortally wounded by King Belayeak's arrow. Sovannasam is generally depicted lying with an arrow sticking out of him while all the wild animals who have accompanied him to the river run away in fright. King Belayeak is depicted either in the pose of still shooting his arrow, or holding his bow in his hand. In some paintings of this scene, the ashram with Sovannasam's parents is added, a little way off in the distance. Another image from the Sovannasam story which is frequently found on temple walls shows Sovannasam carrying both his parents, one on each side, in a traditional hanging carrier. This scene is not mentioned in any text of the Sovannasam Jataka that we could find, and it might have been copied from printed images imported into Cambodia from Thailand and India during the 1980s. The scene is not found in older temple paintings.

=== Characters ===
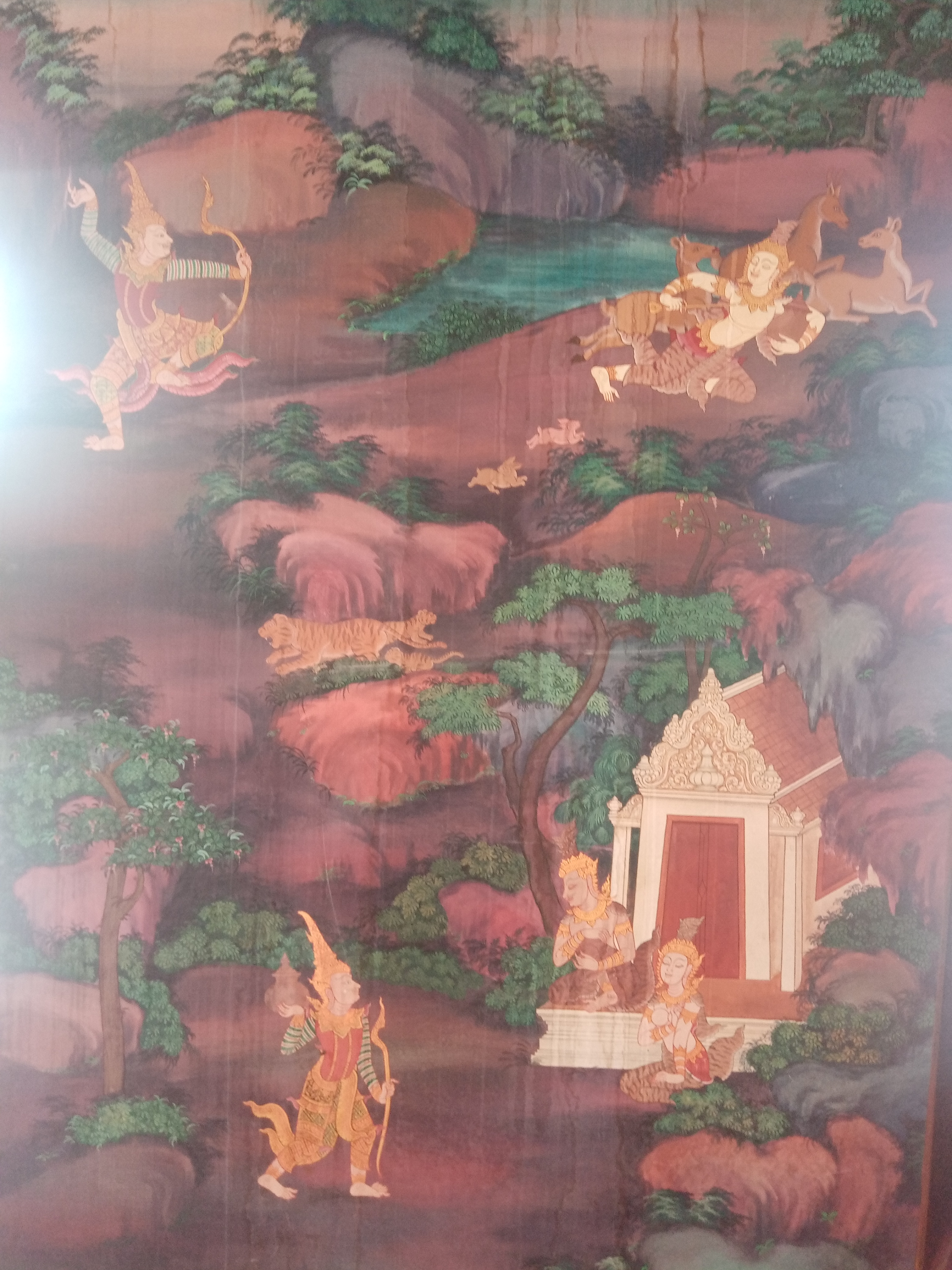
Mural at Wat Jinavararam, Thailand depicting the scene as Suvannasama got shot with an arrow from king Piliyakkha and the king take care Suvannasama' parents.

==== Sovannasam ====
Sovannasam (Pali: suvaṇṇa sāma) is generally depicted as a 16 to 20 year old youth. Individual temple painters depict Sovannasam in a variety of costumes. Generally, he is depicted with his hair coiled in a bun, wearing a tiger skin which is the standard costume of a hermit. He can also be seen represented as a Brahmin wearing white clothes or in an orange costume similar to those worn by monks.

==== King Belayeak ====
Belayeak ( Pali: Piliyakkha), king of Benares, is usually depicted as a monarch, with a headdress, a crossed ornamental chest strap, and various other jewelry. In Wat Saravan Decho (Phnom Penh), Belayeak is depicted as an ordinary hunter, wearing short pants, a short-sleeved shirt, and carrying a bow. In some temples, King Belayeak is depicted with the face of a yeak (demon), influenced by the later part of his name.

==== Dukol and Bareka ====
Sovannasam's parents, Dukol and Bareka ( Pali: Dukūlaka and Pārikā), are generally represented as an elderly couple, sometimes with black hair, sometimes with gray hair. Some temple painters represent Dukol with a moustache and beard as well. The clothing in which the couple is depicted shows a similar variety to that of Sovannasam, and includes tiger skins and varying color “sampot". The elderly couple is not however represented in the kingly costume in which Sovannasam is sometimes rendered.

== Sanchi relief ==
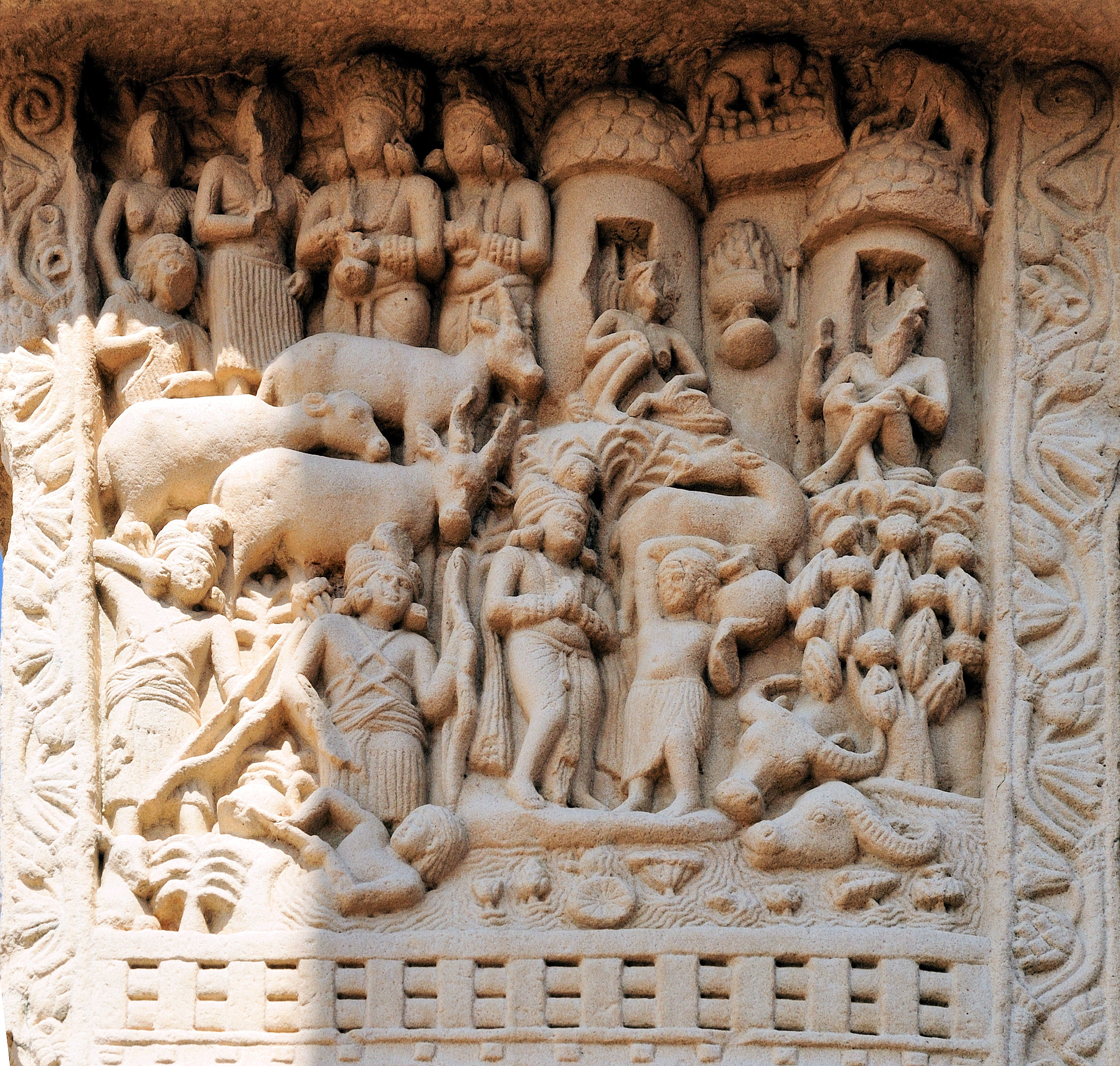
Syama Jataka, Sanchi Stupa 1 Western Gateway.

The Jataka appear on a relief at Sanchi, Stupa No1, Western Gateway. At the right hand top corner of the panel arc the two hermitages with the father and mother seated in front of them. Below them their son Syama is coming to draw water from the stream.

Then, to the left, we see the figure of the King thrice repeated, first shooting the lad in the water, then with bow in hand, then standing penitent with bow and arrow discarded; and in the left top corner are the father, mother and son restored to health, and by their side the god Indra and the king.

== See also ==
- Shravana Kumara
- Jataka (Pali Canon)

== Sources ==
- Public Domain text of "A Guide to Sanchi" published in 1918 in India, John Marshall (1876-1958)
