= Filial piety in Buddhism =

Aspect of Buddhist ethics, story-telling traditions, apologetics and history

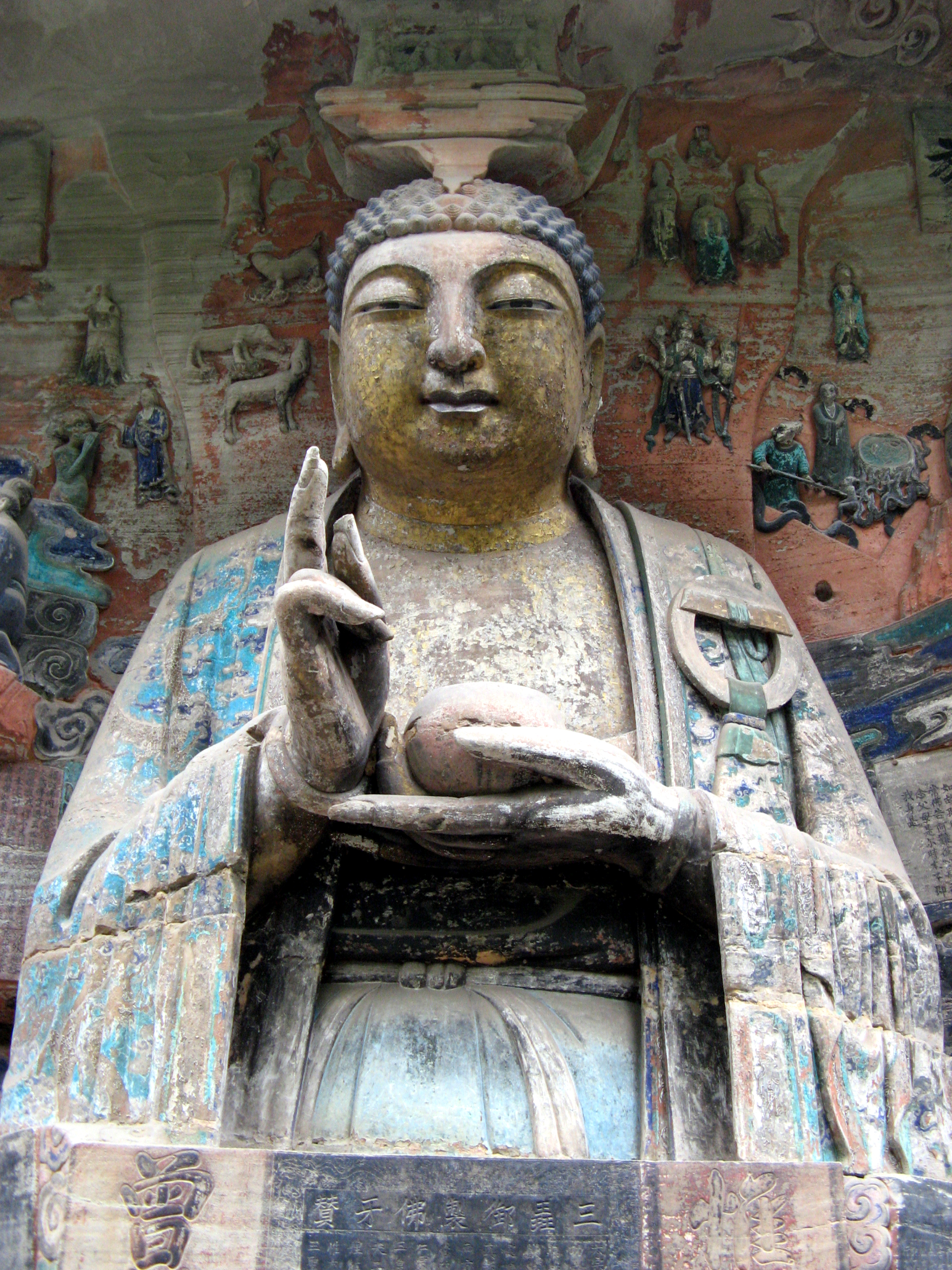
Buddha image with scenes of stories in which he repaid his parents. Mount Baoding Buddhist Sculptures, Dazu, China.

Filial piety has been an important aspect of Buddhist ethics since early Buddhism, and was essential in the apologetics and texts of Chinese Buddhism. In the Early Buddhist Texts such as the Nikāyas and Āgamas, filial piety is prescribed and practiced in three ways: to repay the gratitude toward one's parents; as a good karma or merit; and as a way to contribute to and sustain the social order. In Buddhist scriptures, narratives are given of the Buddha and his disciples practicing filial piety toward their parents, based on the qualities of gratitude and reciprocity. Initially, scholars of Buddhism like Kenneth Ch'en saw Buddhist teachings on filial piety as a distinct feature of Chinese Buddhism. Later scholarship, led by people such as John Strong and Gregory Schopen, has come to believe that filial piety was part of Buddhist doctrine since early times. Strong and Schopen have provided epigraphical and textual evidence to show that early Buddhist laypeople, monks and nuns often displayed strong devotion to their parents, concluding that filial piety was already an important part of the devotional life of early Buddhists.

When Buddhism was introduced in China, it had no organized celibacy. Confucianism emphasized filial piety to parents and loyalty to the emperor, and Buddhist monastic life was seen to go against its tenets. In the 3rd–5th century, as criticism of Buddhism increased, Buddhist monastics and lay authors responded by writing about and translating Buddhist doctrines and narratives that supported filiality, comparing them to Confucianism and thereby defending Buddhism and its value in society. The Mouzi Lihuolun referred to Confucian and Daoist classics, as well as historical precedents to respond to critics of Buddhism. The Mouzi stated that while on the surface the Buddhist monk seems to reject and abandon his parents, he is actually aiding his parents as well as himself on the path towards enlightenment. Sun Chuo (c.300–380) further argued that monks were working to ensure the salvation of all people and making their family proud by doing so, and Liu Xie stated that Buddhists practiced filial piety by sharing merit with their departed relatives. Buddhist monks were also criticized for not expressing their respect to the Chinese emperor by prostrating and other devotion, which in Confucianism was associated with the virtue of filial piety. Huiyuan (334–416) responded that although monks did not express such piety, they did pay homage in heart and mind; moreover, their teaching of morality and virtue to the public helped support imperial rule.

From the 6th century onward, Chinese Buddhists began to realize that they had to stress Buddhism's own particular ideas about filial piety in order to for Buddhism to survive. Śyāma, Sujāti and other Buddhist stories of self-sacrifice spread a belief that a filial child should even be willing to sacrifice its own body. The Ullambana Sūtra introduced the idea of transfer of merit through the story of Mulian Saves His Mother and led to the establishment of the Ghost Festival. By this Buddhists attempted to show that filial piety also meant taking care of one's parents in the next life, not just this life. Furthermore, authors in China—and to some extent Japan—wrote that in Buddhism, all living beings have once been one's parents, and that practicing compassion to all living beings as though they were one's parents is the more superior form of filial piety. Another aspect emphasized was the great suffering a mother goes through when giving birth and raising a child. Chinese Buddhists described how difficult it is to repay the goodness of one's mother, and how many sins mothers often committed in raising her children. The mother became the primary source of well-being and indebtedness for the son, which was in contrast with pre-Buddhist perspectives emphasizing the father. Nevertheless, although some critics of Buddhism did not have much impact during this time, this changed in the period leading up to the Neo-Confucianist revival, when Emperor Wuzong (841–845) started the Great Anti-Buddhist Persecution, citing lack of filial piety as one of his reasons for attacking Buddhist institutions.

Filial piety is still an important value in a number of Asian cultures. In China, Buddhism continued to uphold a role in state rituals and mourning rites for ancestors, up until late imperial times (13th–20th century). Also, sūtras and narratives about filial piety are still widely used. The Ghost Festival is still popular in many Asian countries, especially those countries which are influenced by both Buddhism and Confucianism. Furthermore, in Theravādin countries in South and Southeast Asia, generosity, devotion and transfer of merit to parents are still widely practiced among the population.

== In Buddhist texts ==
In the Early Buddhist Texts such as the Nikāyas and Āgamas, filial piety is prescribed and practiced in three ways: to repay the gratitude toward one's parents; as a good karma or merit; and as a way to contribute to and sustain the social order.

=== Repaying the debt of gratitude ===
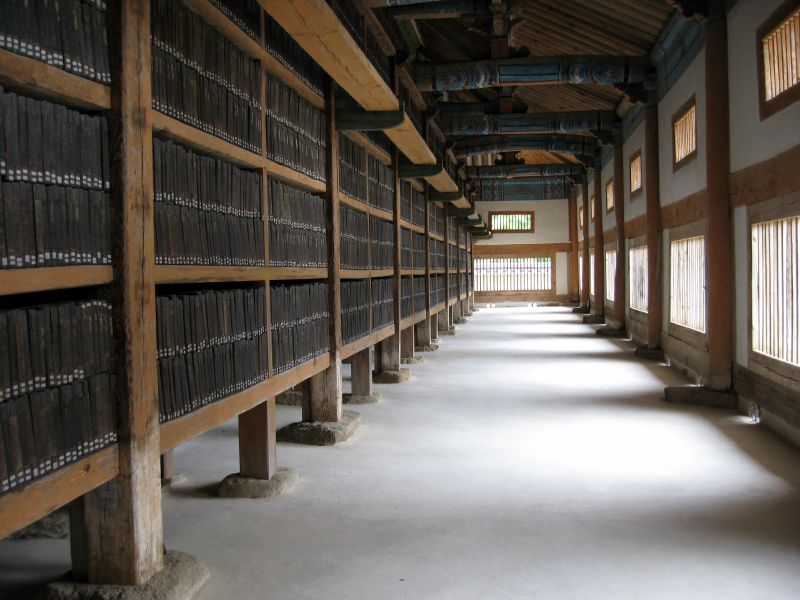
In the Early Buddhist Texts such as the Nikāyas and Āgamas, filial piety is prescribed and practiced.

In the Nikāyas, two qualities are often named in pair: kataññuta and katavedita. Whereas the first word refers to acknowledgement of the indebtedness towards others, the second quality is interpreted as repaying such debt. Buddhist texts often encourage children from the age of discretion to take care of their parents, remember their gratitude to them, honor them and do everything they can to repay their gratitude to them. The care and attention the parents have given the child is seen to deserve full acknowledgment from the child. In a discourse called the Sigalaka Sutta, several ways are mentioned in which a child can repay its parents: "I will perform duties incumbent on them, I will keep up the lineage and tradition (Pali: kula vaṃsa) of my family, I will make myself worthy of my heritage." The deity Sakka is reported to have had seven rules of conduct according to which he lived his life, the first of which being "As long as I live, may I maintain my parents". This rule is also cited in the commentary to the Dhammapada, indicating the impact of filiality during that period.

However, in the early discourse called Kataññu Sutta, the Buddha describes through several metaphors the difficulty in repaying the gratitude of one's parents through material means only. The discourses say that even if children were to carry their parents on their backs their entire lives, or let them be kings and queens of the country, they would still not have repaid the large debt to their parents. Eventually, he concludes that it is only possible to repay one's gratitude by teaching them Buddhism through spiritual qualities, such as faith in Buddhism, morality, generosity and wisdom. (Note: See Horner (1930, p. 11) and Xing (2016, p. 214). The latter author mentions the qualities.) Though this discourse was translated and cited in many Buddhist traditions and schools, it came to be more emphasized with the arising of Mahāyāna Buddhism in India in the 1st century CE.

In a third early discourse called Sabrahmā Sutta, parents are described as worthy of respect and gifts, because they have created their children, and were the ones who educated their children in their formative years. Furthermore, parents have provided the basic requirements for the child to survive. Children who attempt to pay back their debt to their parents by providing for them, are considered "superior people" (Pali: sappurisa) expected to go to a heavenly rebirth in their afterlife, whereas people who are negligent in this, are called "outcasts" (Pali: vasala). (Note: For the typology of people, see Ohnuma (2012, p. 11). For the rebirth in heaven, see Horner (1930, p. 9) and Berkwitz (2003, p. 592 note 19).) Buddhist studies scholar Guang Xing believes a comparison is drawn here between the devotion to Brahma, and the devotion toward one's parents, of which the latter is considered better, because they are considered the real creators. Parents are also compared to "Worthy Ones" and Buddhas, which is similar to the filial devotion expressed in the Hindu Taittirı̄ya Upaniśad.

In a fourth discourse Mahāyañña ('great sacrifice') in the Aṅguttara Nikāya, the Buddha compares reverence toward one's parents, family and religious leaders to fire worship, and concludes that those people are much more useful and meaningful to tend to than the fire. (Note: See Xing (2013, p. 15) and Xing (2016, p. 217). The 2013 study mentions the Aṅguttara Nikāya and the translation of the title.) The parents are mentioned here as first and foremost.

Buddhist studies scholar Reiko Ohnuma does point out, however, that Buddhist texts describe the ideal monk as a person who detaches himself from his parents, which is seen as a hindrance to his spiritual progress. He is to develop even-mindedness, feeling the same for his loved ones and foes. On a similar note, the texts say a monk should see all women as his mother, not only his biological mother. This is considered a helpful method to practice the celibate life.

=== Other early discourses ===
Some early Buddhist texts describe the children's devotion toward their parents as a good deed that will reap religious merit, lead to praise by the wise, and finally, a rebirth in heaven. It is described as a fundamental good deed, and is in some Āgama texts compared to making offerings to a Buddha-to-be (Sanskrit: bodhisattva). By contrast, killing one's parents is considered one of the gravest deeds that could possibly be committed, leading to an immediate destiny to hell. According to Buddhist texts, people who had done so were not allowed to become members of the monastic community, and if they already were but were found out later to have killed a parent, they were expelled. This sentiment is echoed in the later Milindapañhā, which states that a person who committed matricide or patricide cannot attain to insight in Buddhist teachings.

Apart from merit, in many Āgama texts, filial piety is said to lead to an orderly and harmonious society. In Pāli texts, the belief that children are indebted to their parents is a form of right view, part of the Buddhist Noble Eightfold Path.

=== In canonical and post-canonical narratives ===
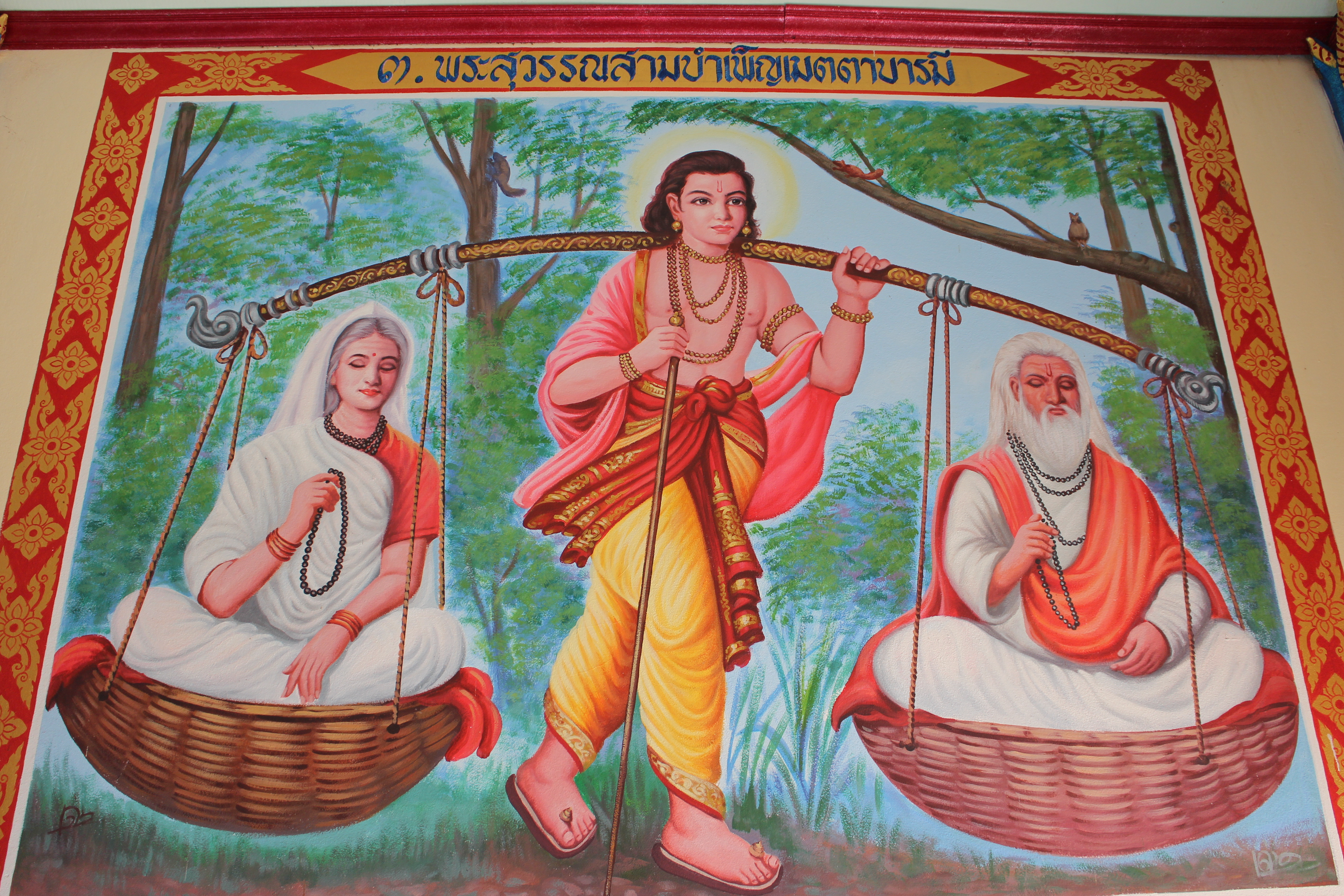
Wall painting of Śyāma carrying his parents, Saphan Sam Temple, Phitsanulok, Thailand

A well-known story that expresses filial piety is the Buddha's journey to the second Buddhist heaven to teach his mother, who died when giving birth to him. It is found in both the Pāli commentaries Aṭṭhasālinī and the commentary to the Dhammapada, as well as the Ekottarika Āgama and Saṃyukta Āgama. (Note: See Xing (2016, p. 219) and Xing (2012, pp. 81–2). The 2012 study specifies the texts.) On a similar note, the Pāli tradition relates how the Buddha teaches his father Suddhodana on several occasions, eventually helping his father to attain enlightenment. Further, the Mahāyāna tradition has it that the Buddha organizes a funeral ceremony for his father out of piety. The Buddha is not only depicted as showing filial piety to his natural parents, but also his foster mother Mahāpajāpatī. Ohnuma has argued that a major reason for the Buddha to allow his foster mother to become a full-fledged Buddhist nun, and thereby starting the order of nuns, was gratitude toward her.

In stories of the previous lives of the Buddha, there are several examples that illustrate filial piety. In one life found in several Buddhist collections, the Buddha-to-be is Śyāma, a filial son who takes care of his blind parents in their old age. This story was very popular in Buddhist India, as derived from epigraphical evidence from the first centuries CE, and can be found in both the Pāli and Chinese Buddhist scriptures. In the Pāli version of the story, it is prefaced by the life of a man who is ordained as a monk. After having been a monk for 17 years, he discovers his parents are abused by their servants and are starving. He then feels he needs to choose between the monastic vocation and taking care of his destitute parents as a lay person, since he assumes he cannot do so as a monk. The Buddha is able to prevent him from disrobing, however, and teaches him he can take care of his parents while still in monk's robes. The monk then decides to share gifts of food and cloth with them regularly, for which he is criticized by his fellow monks. His fellow monks consider this inappropriate for a Buddhist monk and report this to the Buddha. The Buddha, however, speaks high praise of the monk's filial piety, and he relates a discourse called the Mātuposaka Sutta, as well his own previous life as Śyāma. (Note: See Wilson (2014, pp. 191) and Strong (1983, p. 175). For the cloth, see Strong.) In this previous life, the Buddha-to-be was taking care of his blind parents, but was accidentally shot by a king hunting. Whilst his last thoughts went out to his parents who would no longer have any one to take care of them, a deity intervened and Śyāma came back to life. In some versions of the story, it is the mother who makes an "act of truth" referring to the virtue of her son, and by doing so magically revives him.

There is also a story of the elder Maudgalyayāna, one of the main disciples of the Buddha, who is described saving his mother from hell by sharing his religious merits. In this story, Maudgalyayāna sees through meditative vision that his mother who has just died is reborn in hell. Shocked by this, he tries to use his meditative psychic powers to help his mother, but to no avail. Then the Buddha advises him to do meritorious acts toward the monastic community on behalf of his mother, which does help.

=== In Mahāyāna texts ===
Early Buddhist texts, such as the Māta Sutta of the Saṃyutta Nikāya, mention that every living being has once been one's relative in a previous life in the cycle of birth and rebirth. In Mahāyāna Buddhism, therefore, helping to liberate other living beings from suffering came to be seen as a form of filial piety, since it was believed that all beings could have once been one's parents. This doctrine has affected Buddhist practice as well. For example, in some forms of Tibetan meditation, practitioners are instructed to develop loving-kindness to all living beings by remembering that all could have been their mother in previous lifetimes. Just as in Pāli texts, Mahāyāna texts compare particularistic love negatively to universal love, which is seen as superior.

== History ==
=== Early Buddhist history ===
In the early days of Western Buddhist scholarship, a number of scholars, among which Indologist I.B. Horner (1896–1981) and linguist Jean Przyluski (1885–1944), emphasized the role of filial piety in Indian Buddhism. However, in later years, scholars such as Hajime Nakamura, Michihata Ryōshū, Miyakawa Hasayuki and Kenneth Ch'en developed the perspective that filial piety was unique for the period in which Buddhism was introduced in China, and had not been part of Indian Buddhism before that. (Note: For Horner, Ryōshū and Hasayuki, see Hinsch (2002, p. 51). For Ch'en, see Schopen (1997, p. 57) and Xing (2016, pp. 212–3). For Przyluski, see Strong (1983, p. 172). For Nakamura, see Nakamura (1991, p. 269).) But in a more recent development, starting with Buddhist studies scholars such as John Strong and Gregory Schopen, it has been shown that filial piety was part of Buddhist teaching since early times, though Strong did regard it as a compromise to Brahmanical ethics. In early Buddhism, filial piety was an important part of Buddhist ethics, though not as fundamental to ethics as it was in Confucianism.

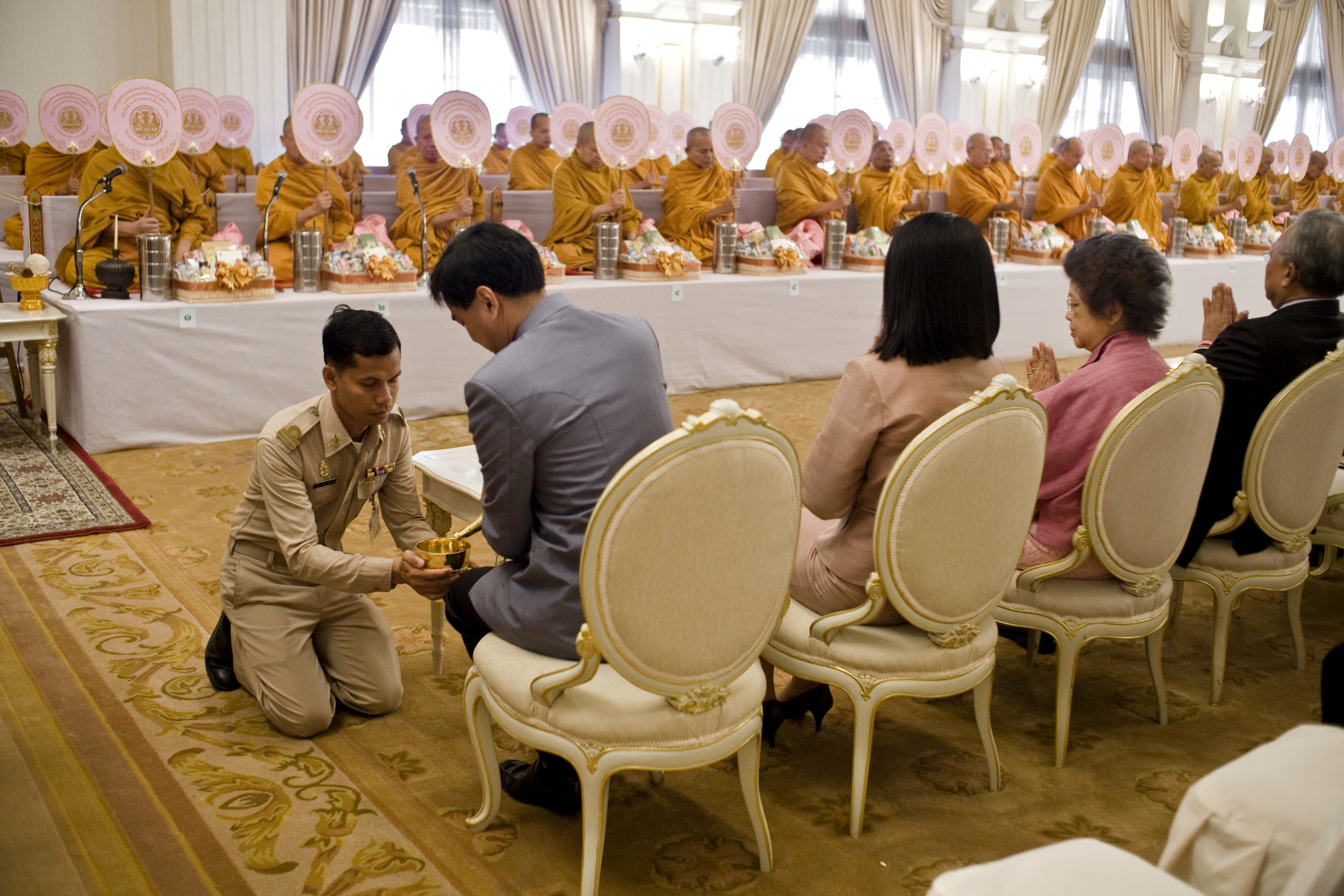
Ceremony for transfer of merit.

At the time when Buddhism developed in India, there was criticism that Buddhist otherworldly ideals did not fit in with expectations of filial piety. Devotion to the mother was seen as a fundamental virtue, and early Buddhists had to reconcile Buddhist doctrine and practice with Indian social institutions. Schopen found much epigraphic evidence and some textual evidence showing that early Buddhist laypeople, monks and nuns often displayed strong devotion to their deceased parents, concluding filial piety was already an important part of the devotional life of early Buddhists. Contrary to the general scholarly view, devotional practices like dedicating the merit of a building to one's parents were common among Buddhist monastics, even more so than among laypeople. There is also textual evidence to suggest that the ties monastics had with their parents were not absolutely severed as ideally prescribed. For example, in some texts of monastic discipline there are anecdotes that suggest monastics regularly kept contact with their parents, expressed concern for them, and even borrowed money to support them. (Note: See Ohnuma (2012, pp. 184–7). For the borrowing of money, see Schopen (2004, pp. 138–9).) Also, in many Jātaka stories monks are mentioned that take care of their parents, sometimes financially. Lastly, John Strong and Kenneth Ch'en have argued that the doctrine of the transfer of merit, so much emphasized in the filial story of Mulian Saves His Mother, originated in Indian Buddhism, within the context of ancestor worship and offerings to hungry ghosts. (Note: For the relation with ancestor worship, see Strong (1983, p. 185). For the relation with hungry ghosts, see Ch'en (1968, p. 90 note 23).) Scholar of religion Stephen F. Teiser has stated, however, that there is no evidence of an Indian predecessor to the Chinese Ghost Festival with its emphasis on salvation of ancestors.

Although many similarities can be found between the contexts in which Indian and Chinese Buddhism arose, it was only in China that Buddhism would, in Strong's words, "systematically and self-consciously" develop its response to the question of filial piety.

=== Introduction of Buddhism in China ===
Buddhism stressed individual salvation, which went against the Confucian tenets, that mostly focused on family life and society. Buddhism advocated monasticism and celibacy, and emphasized the suffering inherent in family life, which was unacceptable in the Confucian world view. Confucianism considered it a child's duty to continue the parental line. Moreover, celibacy did not exist in China before the arrival of Buddhism. Therefore, in early medieval China (c. 100–600), Buddhism was heavily criticized for what Confucianists perceived as a disregard for Confucian virtues and role ethics among family members. In addition, Buddhist monks were without descendants, and therefore did not create the offspring necessary to continue the ancestor worship in next generations. Furthermore, Buddhist monks shaved their heads, which was perceived as a lack of filial piety, because Confucianism saw the human body as a "living monument of filial piety" and considered tonsure a form of mutilation. (Note: There were also more literal forms of self-mutilation among some Buddhists, such as applying burn marks and self-immolation. Confucianists also took issue with Buddhists changing their surname to a religious name when becoming a monk.)

Another problem was that early Chinese Buddhist monks did not formally pay homage to the emperor, which was seen as going against social propriety and was connected with the idea that Buddhism did not adhere to filial piety. This already became a problem in the Eastern Jin dynasty (266–420). Furthermore, during the Wei (386–550) and Jin Dynasties, many Chinese women became ordained as nuns and left their families behind, which was very disturbing for Buddhism's critics.

Nevertheless, many Chinese Buddhists still adhered strongly to Confucian values, and attempted to reconcile the two value systems. In the process of introducing and integrating Buddhism in China, historian Kenneth Ch'en distinguished three stages. In the first stage, Buddhism actively advocated filial piety as a Confucian virtue. In the second stage, Buddhists referred to their own tradition to make an argument that filial piety had always been part of it. In the last stage, they argued that Buddhist ethics were more universal and therefore more superior than Confucian kinship-oriented filial piety. Over time, the debate between critics and Buddhists became more refined as more Buddhist texts were translated and Buddhism became better known in China.

==== Apologetics and adaptation (3rd–5th century) ====
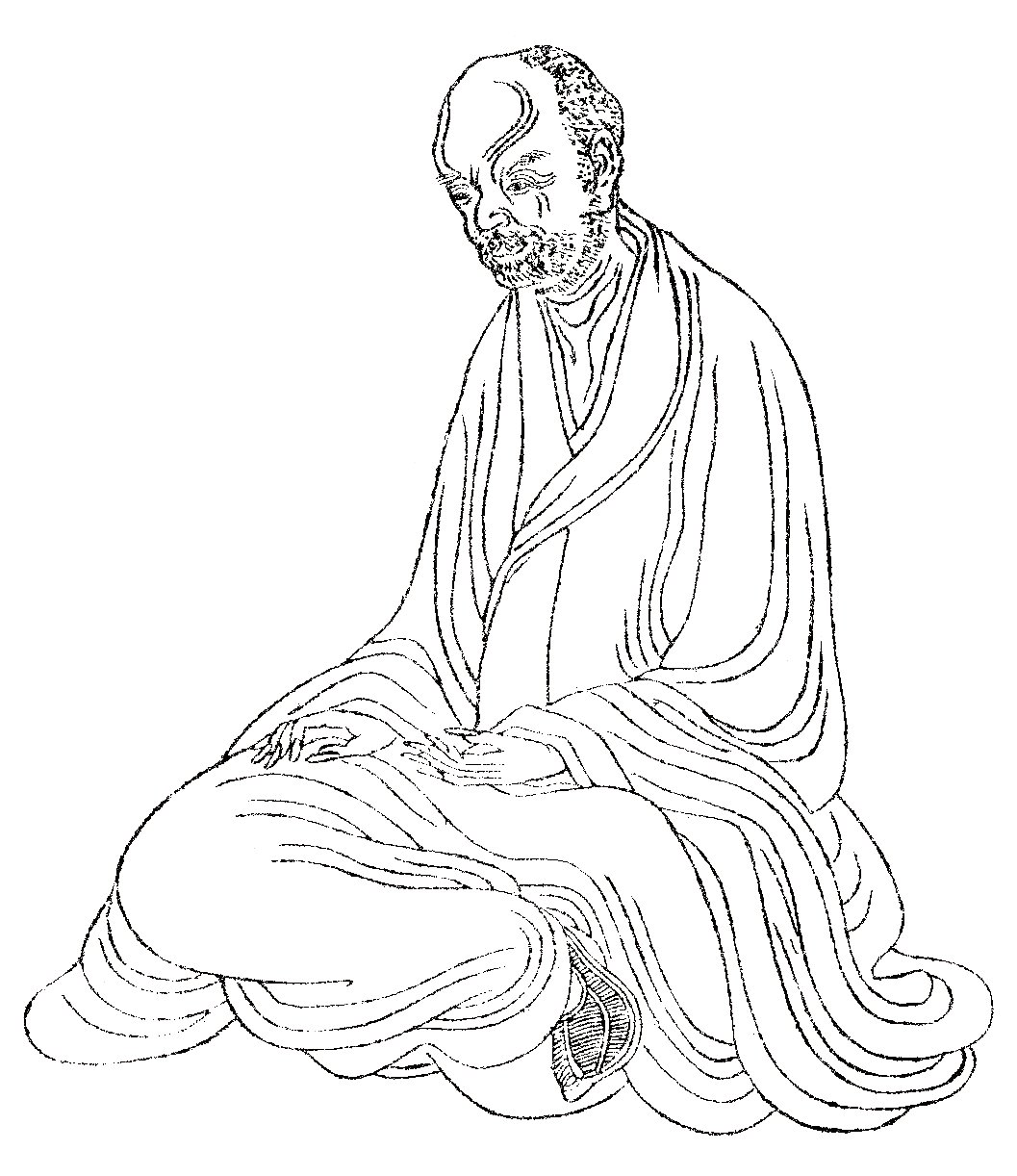
Huiyuan (334–416) argued that Buddhist monks did not have to show homage externally, in order to be pious to the emperor.

When Buddhism was introduced to China, it was redefined to support filial piety. Many elements of Buddhist teaching were once secondary in Indian Buddhism, but now gained new importance and a new function in a process of apologetics.

For example, the Mouzi Lihuolun (牟子理惑論) presented arguments why Buddhist practices did not go against Confucius, but were actually praised by him. The Mouzi does this by referring to the Confucian and Daoist classics, as well as historical precedents. (Note: It is disputed who the author of the Mouzi was.) In one passage, the text compares the life of a Buddhist monk with a pious son who saves his father from drowning:

"A long time ago, the Ch'i people crossed a large river in a boat and it happened that their father fell into the water. His sons rolled up their sleeves, seized his head, and turned him upside down, forcing the water out of his mouth, thus bringing their father back to life. Now, to seize one's father's head and turn him upside down is certainly not very filial. Yet they could have done nothing better to save their father's life. If they had folded their hands and practiced the norm of filial sons, their father's life would have been lost in the waters."

The behavior of a Buddhist monk is similar. While on the surface the Buddhist seems to reject and abandon his parents, the pious Buddhist is actually aiding his parents as well as himself on the path towards enlightenment. In this regard, the Mouzi cites Confucius saying that judgments should be made appropriately, weighing circumstances. In a way, Buddhists claimed therefore that a Buddhist monk benefited his parents, and in superior ways than Confucianism, because their renunciation was the "height of self-giving".

The Mouzi Lihuolun also attempted to counter charges that not having children was a violation of good ethics. It was pointed out that Confucius himself had praised a number of ascetic sages who had not had children or family, but because of their wisdom and sacrifice were still perceived as ethical by Confucius. The argument that Buddhist filial piety concerns itself with the parent's soul is the most important one. Later, Sun Chuo (c.300–380), made an even stronger argument, by stating that Buddhists monks (far from working solely for their own benefit) were working to ensure the salvation of all people and making their family proud by doing so. (Note: See Zurcher (2007, p. 134). Kunio (2004, p. 116) specifies that monks make their families proud, and Xing (2018, p. 12) argues that this is a better argument than those of the Mouzi.) Any change in the son's status would reflect on the parent, therefore the spiritual achievements of the monk were at the same time a form of filial piety toward his parents. In that sense, Sun Chuo claimed that Buddhism teaches what amounts to a perfect form of filial piety, which he further amplified by referring to the Buddha's conversion of his father. Sun Chuo also responded to criticism with regard to the story of Sudāna (Sanskrit: Viśvantara), a previous life of the Buddha, in which a prince becomes an ascetic and gives away his father's possessions, his own wife and children as a practice of generosity. Sun Chuo's opponent critic described Sudāna as an "inhuman creature", but Sun Chuo argued that Sudāna had realized the highest form of filial piety, because in his final lifetime as Gautama Buddha he would eventually help his family to attain enlightenment. Sun Chuo concluded: "If this is not filial piety and humanity, then what is piety and humanity?"

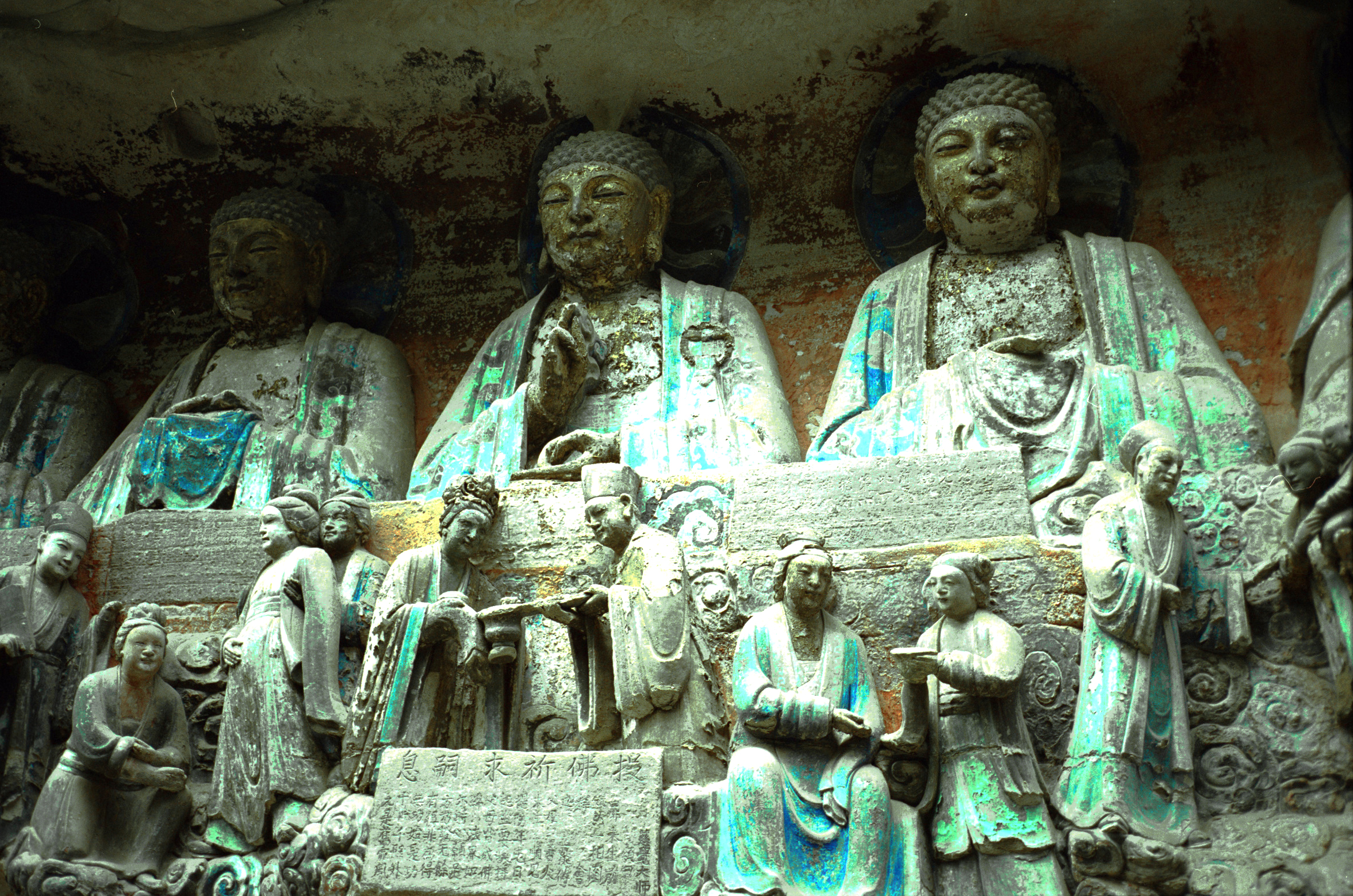
Seven Buddhas and the deeds of filial piety they performed in previous lives. Mount Baoding Buddhist Sculptures, Dazu, China, 12th–13th century.

Responding to criticism from emperor Huan Xuan (369–404), Huiyuan (334–416) argued that Buddhist monks did not have to pay homage to the emperor in "a manifested way", but just in heart and mind. Buddhist monks did in fact support imperial rule, he continued, but do so by teaching virtue to the people and in that way "all the six relationships, father and son, older and younger brother, husband and wife, will be benefited". (Note: See Xing (2016, p. 224). Xing (2018, p. 12) mentions the part on supporting imperial rule. The quote is from Ch'en (1968, p. 94).) He further stated that in order to become a monk, a devotee had to ask permission from his parents and emperor first—ordination as a monk was therefore not against filial piety, he argued. This argument was supported by certain rules in the Indian Buddhist monastic discipline, but the intention behind these rules was redefined to show that Buddhism was congruent with traditions of piety and loyalty. In his arguments Huiyuan was supported by some government officials and prominent lay people. His writings effectively stopped the debate with regard to monks not prostrating for the emperor, but the more general issue of the Buddhist monastic order being exempt from certain duties and obligations still remained. (Note: See Xing (2018, p. 12) and Poceski (2017, p. 57). Poceski explains how the discussion after Huiyuan's rebuttals proceeded.)

During the Northern and Southern dynasties (420–577), Buddhism developed much in China, and conflicts arose with Daoists and Confucianists. A Daoist wrote a polemic called the Sanpo Lun attacking Buddhism for destroying the nation and the family. He argued that monks did not do anything productive, and resources were wasted on building Buddhist monasteries. He also criticized the shaving of hair as "destructive to the person". Again, Buddhist writers responded in defense. Sengshun replied that Buddhist supported imperial rule by promoting virtuous behavior, referring to the Shanshengzi Jing (Chinese: 善生子經, i.e. the Chinese translation of the Sigalaka Sutta) to show that Buddhists observed social norms. In addition, Liu Xie argued that Buddhist monks and lay people did practice filial piety, but monks did so by sharing merit with their departed relatives. Responding to the criticism that monks shave their hair, Liu Xie stated they abandoned minor filial acts in order to perform greater ones. (Note: See Xing (2018, p. 12). Xing (2010b, p. 256) mentions the Shanshengzi Jing.)

The adaptation of Buddhism to fit in with Confucian expectations of filial piety did not only take place on an academic level. Even on the grassroots level, in folk religion, Buddhism was adapted to fit in with Confucian values, as evidenced in the 5th-century text Tiwei Boli Jing.

==== Reinvention (6th–13th century) ====
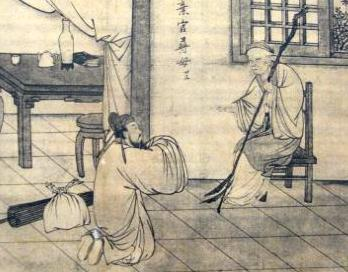
Drawing in a 1846 version of The Twenty-four Filial Exemplars, of which the story of Śyāma eventually became part.

In the process of integrating Buddhism in Chinese culture, Buddhists soon realized that refutation of criticism by Confucianists was not sufficient to hold their own. Chinese Buddhism had to stress its own ideas about filial piety. To more directly point out the Buddhist's filial nature, passages and parables about filial piety in Northwest Indian and Central Asian Buddhism became very prominent in Chinese Buddhism. (Note: See Ch'en (1973, p. 18). Knapp (2014, pp. 137, 140) specifies the region in India.) The story of Śyāma (Chinese: 晱子; pinyin: Shanzi or Yamuku) was an example of this. The story was often mentioned in the Chinese canon of Buddhist texts, was included in a number of different anthologies such as the Liudu Jijing and even the Confucian tradition of twenty-four stories of filial piety (1260–1368). (Note: In the process of the appropriation of this story by Confucianists, however, Śyāma was remodeled as a Confucian from the Zhou dynasty: "... the story of Sāma, told to convince Chinese of Buddhism's support for filiality, instead ended up convincing them that Sāma was no Buddhist but a Confucian".) A similar story of Sujāti (Chinese: 須闍提; pinyin: Xusheti) relates that she cut off her own flesh to feed her parents, to keep them alive. During the Tang dynasty (618–907), the story gained much popularity and it was eventually transformed into a Confucian classic tale as well. Furthermore, it was a way for Chinese Buddhists to make a statement that Buddhist filial piety was superior to Confucian filial piety. Sujāti and other Buddhist stories of self-sacrifice spread a belief that a filial child should even be willing to sacrifice its own body.

As for the story of Maudgalyayāna, this was incorporated in the Ullambana Sūtra, and led to the establishment of the Ghost Festival in China in the 6th century. (Note: See Xing (2016, p. 221) and Wilson (2014, p. 194). Xing mentions the Sūtra.) The festival was held in the seventh moon of the Chinese calendar, and commemorated Maudgalyayāna (pinyin: Mulian) saving his mother. The festival became very popular throughout Chinese society, even to the point of imperial families and government officers becoming involved. The story also became very popular: though already part of the Indian Buddhist tradition, East Asian Buddhism raised it from a peripheral role to a central one. Buddhists attempted to show that filial children could still take care of their parents in the afterlife, a concept which they believed Confucianists overlooked. Some Buddhist authors like Ch'i-sung proclaimed that Buddhists not only practiced filial piety, but also did so at a more deeper level than Confucianists, because they took care of their parents in both this life and the next. The Sutra on a Filial Son stated in this regard that the best way to repay one's parents' kindness was by helping them to develop faith in Buddhism, not just by taking care of them materially. On a similar note, the monk Zongmi (780–841) argued that the main motivation for Prince Siddhārtha leaving his parents and becoming a monk was so he could teach them later on and thereby repay his debt of gratitude to them. Zongmi described the Ghost Festival as the highest expression of filial piety, in which Buddhist and Confucian doctrine could meet.

Apart from religious texts, the first generations of Buddhists in China responded to criticism from Confucianists by emphasizing the lay life more and the monastic life less in their teachings, and for those who did become ordained as monastics, they decided to erect monasteries in populated areas, instead of retreating to the remote wilderness. This also helped to contribute to the social expectations of Chinese Confucian culture. By the end of the 6th century, Buddhist monks were paying homage to the Chinese emperor through rituals and services, which also helped to stop the argument whether monks should prostrate themselves. Nevertheless, in 662 emperor Gaozong issued decrees obliging monks to prostrate before their parents and the emperor. Dao Xuan and Fa Lin, standing in the tradition of Huiyuan, argued that monks paid respects internally, and that such internal respect was more important than outward expression. There was so much opposition that Gaozong had to adjust the decree and eventually fully rescind it.

Later, in the middle of the Tang dynasty, Han Yu attempted to criticize Buddhism for lack of filial piety in a memorandum, but his protests were suppressed by emperor Xianzong and not much responded to. Han Yu was nearly executed and banished. His popularity later rose, however. During the 10th-century neo-Confucianist revival, Han Yu's writings were rediscovered and he became a saintly figure. Already in the 9th century, Emperor Wuzong took Han Yu's arguments to heart and began a campaign to extinguish Buddhism (841–845), citing as one of the justifications that Buddhists would "abandon their rulers and parents for the company of teachers". Monastics were defrocked and monasteries were destroyed at a large scale. Although Wuzong's successor Emperor Xuanzong (810–859) attempted to recover the damage done, since that time Chinese Buddhism has never completely recovered to its former status. It did continue to uphold a role in state rituals and mourning rites for ancestors, up until late imperial times (13th–20th century). Monasteries were given names like "Monastery for Honoring Loyalty [to the State]" and "Monastery for the Glorification of Filial Piety".

Neo-Confucianism upheld the principle of "gradational love" (pinyin: ren-yi), which argued that good people should develop filial piety for their parents and neighbors first, and only in a later stage develop love for humankind. Although this idea was influenced by Mahāyāna Buddhist doctrine, the principle was eventually used as a criticism against Buddhism, which was seen to disregard filial piety in favor of universal kindness.

===== New elements =====
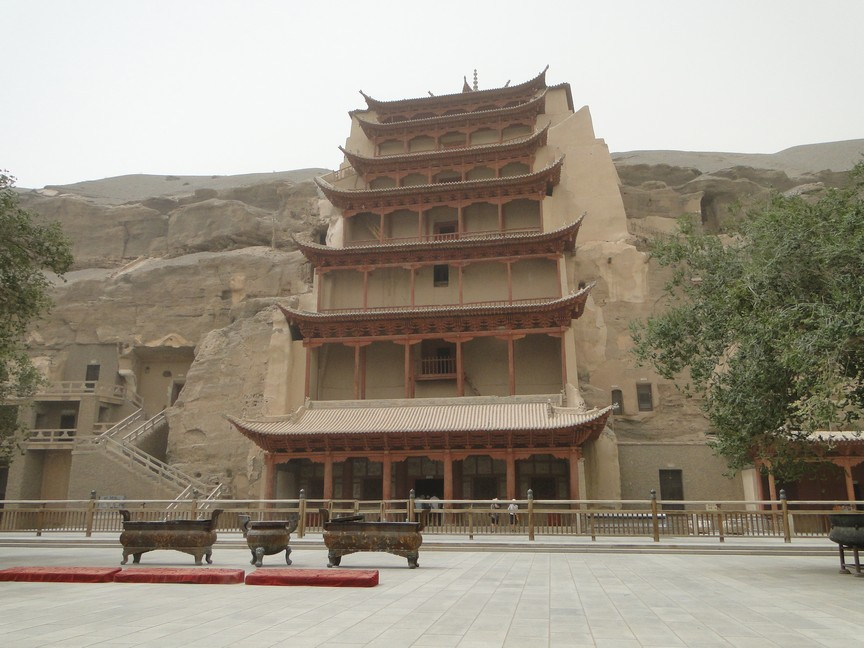
In the Dunhuang grottoes illustrations were found of the Discourse on the Difficulty in Paying the Debt to Parents

During this period, in response to attacks from Confucianists and Daoists, works written in defense of filial piety in Buddhism reflected a higher level of maturity. For example, in response to Daoist criticism that Buddhism teaches abandonment of one's parents, Fa Lin responded by referring to the Buddhist idea that all living beings might have been our parents, but also our enemies. A wise man therefore practices impartiality and seeks enlightenment. This is the Buddhist way to benefit one's parents and all living beings. The Chan/Zen master Qisong (1007 – 1072) criticized Han Yu's writings for not conforming to Confucian doctrine. Also, during this time some Buddhist writers started to argue that the five moral precepts in Buddhism were an expression of filial piety. Although the promotion of the five precepts by Buddhist monks had previously been referred to as a way to support imperial rule and therefore a form of filial piety, Buddhist writers now took this further. In particular, Qisong in his work the Xiaolun equated each of the precepts with a Confucian virtue (known as "five constants"), but argued that Buddhist ethics were superior to Confucian ethics, because of the virtue of compassion for all living beings. This is a higher form of filial piety, he argued, because one presumes that all living beings have once been our parents and tries to repay the debt of gratitude to them. Qisong summarized his argument by stating that "[f]ilial piety is venerated in all religious teachings, but it is especially true in Buddhism". On a similar note, the Fanwang Jing (Chinese: 梵網經) contained a phrase stating that "filial piety is called precepts", which inspired writings by Buddhist scholars on the subject and made the Fanwang Jing very popular.

Furthermore, in order for Confucianists to accept Buddhism more easily, new elements were introduced in the Buddhist doctrine. During the Han dynasty (202 BCE–9 CE), Chinese Buddhist leaders introduced the teaching of the four debts that a person should repay: the moral debt to one's parents, to all living beings, to one's ruler and to the Triple Gem (the Buddha, his teaching and the monastic community). Perhaps inspired by Brahmanical teachings, Chinese Buddhists hoped that edifying people about the four debts would help for Buddhism to become more accepted in China. However, the teaching of the four debts only gained much popularity during the 8th century, when the Mahāyāna Discourse on the Concentration of Mind Ground was translated in Chinese (pinyin: Dacheng Ben Shengxin Di Guan Jing) by Prajñā.

In the 2nd century CE, another text was composed based on the Kataññnu Sutta (Sanskrit: Katajña Sūtra), called the Fumuen Nanbao Jing, the Discourse on the Difficulties in Repaying Parents' Debts. The text emphasized the compassion parents have towards their children. It later became highly popular in East Asian countries, as it was cited in at least ten Chinese translations of Indian texts. Based on this text, the more popular Fumu Enzhong Jing was composed (Chinese: 父母恩重經, title has similar meaning). The Fumu was depicted in illustrations found in the Dunhuang caves dating back to the Tang (618–907) and Song dynasties (960–1279). (Note: See Xing (2012, p. 79) and Xing (2016, p. 224) The 2016 study dates the murals.) Popular preaching and lectures, mural and cave paintings and stone carvings indicate that it once was very popular among the common people.

==== The role of women ====
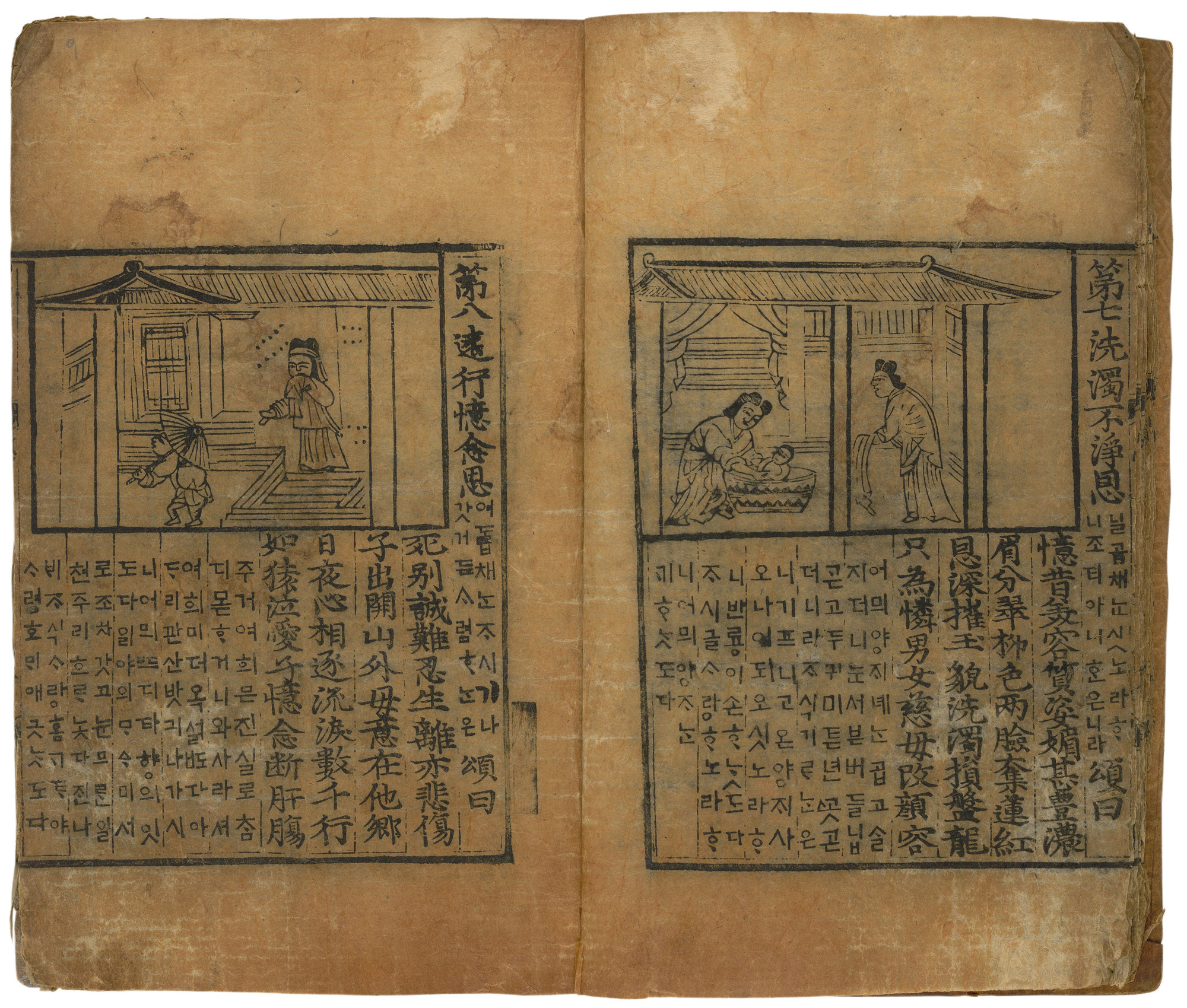
Sūtra of Filial Piety, Korean woodblock, 16th century

When Buddhism developed in China, not only filial piety itself was redefined, but also the role of women in Chinese culture: in texts such as the Yuyenü Jing women, especially daughters-in-law, were described as pious children, a description that had hardly been used for women. This changed all genres of writing from the early medieval period onward. Buddhist doctrine helped fulfill the need for changing post-Han society to deal with daughters-in-law perceived as unruly, (Note: From the 3rd century onward, women had a more dominant role in Chinese society. There was much criticism of this trend, as women's behavior was perceived as unruly and shameless.) by providing a role for her as a filial daughter where indigenous tradition was silent or ambiguous. In edifying stories about virtuous daughters-in-law, women were given a pivotal role in creating harmony in the family, which was unprecedented. However, although daughters' expression of filial piety was basically the same as that of sons, daughters expressed it in more extreme forms, including infanticide or suicide. Often their role only became important in the absence of any sons.

On a similar note, in 517, the monk Shi Baochang wrote a number of hagiographies of virtuous nuns. In these stories, a new ideal Chinese woman was constructed, who was both filial yet also practiced Buddhist virtues. In Baochang's stories, he depicted women that excelled at both Confucian and Buddhist virtue and practices, by either combining such practices, practicing them at different periods in life (e.g. being a filial daughter and later choosing the nun's life), or by transforming Confucian practices in Buddhist practices. Though the ideal of self-sacrifice agreed with Confucian values, such sacrifice was redefined fitting with Buddhist values. Through these writings, Chinese Buddhists attempted to connect the family with the monastery in a mutually supportive relationship. Inscriptions show that female donors of Buddhist monasteries often dedicated their generosity to their parents, effectively helping to establish a new ideal of female filial piety. Also, the legend of Miaoshan became quite popular, which related how the bodhisattva Guanyin is born as a princess and refuses to marry following her father's wishes. She eventually manages to find salvation for herself and her father, when she heals her father from his illness by sacrificing some of her body parts to be used for medicine. This story is still used by Buddhist women in Singapore to justify their resistance to marriage. Another story that connects filial piety with the bodhisattva figure is that of Dizang's previous lives, both as filial daughters.

Buddhist writings on filial piety influenced Confucianism and Chinese culture at large. In India, where Buddhism originated, women had different social roles than in China, and devotion of the child to the mother was an important virtue. The debt of a child to its mother was seen as more important than the debt to its father, and hurting one's mother was considered more severe than hurting one's father. Although a child was seen to be indebted to both parents, "[t]he obligation to the father is a call of duty, whereas the obligation to the mother is a pull of love". In Tang dynasty China, a number of apocryphal texts were written that spoke of the Buddha's respect for his parents, and the parent–child relationship. The most important of these, the Sūtra of Filial Piety, was written early in the Tang dynasty. This discourse has the Buddha make the argument that parents bestow kindness to their children in many ways, and put great efforts into ensuring the well-being of their child. The discourse continues by describing how difficult it is to repay one's parents' kindness, but concludes that this can be done, in a Buddhist way. The Fumu Enzhong Jing contained a similar message.

The Sūtra of Filial Piety was not only a way for Chinese Buddhists to adapt to Confucian ideals, it added its own Buddhist contribution to the concept of filial piety. It added the role of women and poor people in practicing filial piety, and regarded filial piety as a quality to be practiced toward all living beings in this and the next life. Therefore, the sūtra served not only as an adaptation to Confucian values, but also served Buddhist ideals of edification. In their teachings about filial piety, Chinese Buddhists emphasized the great suffering a mother goes through when giving birth and raising a child. They described how difficult it is to repay one's parents, and how many sins the mother often would commit in raising her children. They even went so far that she might even go to hell as a result of the sins she committed. The mother became the primary source of well-being and indebtedness for the son, which was in contrast with pre-Buddhist perspectives. This emphasis on the son's obligation to the mother was a new addition to the Chinese concept of filial piety, as the bond between mother and son became the primary relationship. (Note: A common idea found in Chinese Buddhist texts was that a mother breast-fed her child for three years, and the breast milk originated from the mother's blood: "For three years you drank your mother's white blood". See also Andaya (2002, p. 21) for similar motives in South-East Asian vernacular texts.) According to scholar Nomura Shin'ichi, the ideal of the son repaying the gratitude to his mother played an important part in uniting two contrasting ideas in East Asian culture at the time, that is, the concept of feminine impurity on the one hand and the ideal of pure motherhood on the other hand. The son was taught to deal with this indebtedness to his mother by making donations to the local monastery. The monastery would then perform recitation of texts and dedicate the merit to the mother, which would help her. In other words, to be a good son, one also had to be a good Buddhist. Religious studies scholar Alan Cole has attempted to describe the role of women in Chinese Buddhism using a Freudian framework. Cole states that Chinese Buddhist texts depicted women as examples of virtue and sacrifice, but also as lustful and greedy people. However, Cole's monograph about the family in Chinese Buddhism has received mixed reviews and his conclusions are disputed.

Chinese Buddhists urged people to stop killing animals for ancestor worship, because this would create only bad karma; rather, people were encouraged to practice devotion and make merit, especially making donations to the Buddhist clergy and in that way to help their mothers from a bad rebirth in hell. (Note: See Idema (2008, p. 209 n.66), Idema (2009, p. xvii) and Berezkin (2015, Ch. 1). Berezkin mentions the devotional practices.) The traditional ancestral sacrifices were therefore discouraged by Chinese Buddhists.

=== Development in other parts of Asia ===
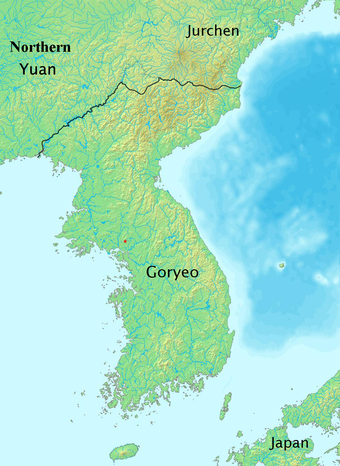
The Discourse on the Difficulty in Paying the Debt to Parents was introduced in Korea in the Goryeo period.

The Discourse on the Difficulty in Paying the Debt to Parents was introduced and translated in Korea in the Goryeo period, in the 17th century. In the 18th and 19th centuries, the Confucian value of filial piety toward parents and emperor became strongly associated with Buddhism. Important in this process was the spread of edifying vernacular songs, in which filial children were encouraged to chant invocations of the Buddha Amitabha for their parents' rebirth in a Pure Land. Further, the songs, meant for Buddhists, urged people to respectfully serve social relationships including parents, in agreement with Confucian social ethics. In an 18th-century shaman song informed by Buddhist principles, a princess called Pari kongju is abandoned by her parents because they want a male heir. She is later saved by the Buddha and raised by others. Despite being abandoned, she later finds medicine for her ill royal parents and cures them out of filial piety.

During the Edo period in Japan (1603–1868), large quantities of biographies of filial people were written, as Japanese authors were inspired by Ming dynasty Chinese texts and started writing extensively about filial piety. Some of these works were written by Japanese Buddhist monks, writing about filial Buddhist lay people or monks. Others were written by Chinese Buddhist monks that had moved to Japan as part of initiatives to revitalize Buddhism for Chinese residents in Japan. Bankei Yōtaku (1622–1693) emphasized filial piety in his teachings, considering it part of Buddhahood. In the 18th-century, filial piety was reinterpreted by Japanese writers such as Fórì and Tōrei Enji. Just like in Song dynasty China, filial piety was not seen as just a virtue to be practiced towards parents, relatives and ancestors, but to all living beings. Since all living beings were seen to have been one's parents from previous lives, the filial role of the individual was more broadly construed, and blood lines were interpreted in a more spiritual sense rather than only blood relations. With this, Tōrei meant to emphasize the role of religion and its lineage. Therefore, in Japan, Buddhists regarded the position of Buddhism on filial piety as either the same as in Confucianism, or as broader and deeper than in Confucianism.

In South and Southeast Asia, the example of the Buddha maintaining a loving relationship with his family, as depicted in a wide range of narratives, had a profound effect in countries where Theravāda Buddhism took hold. In devotional texts, parents were mentioned in the same list with the Triple Gem as object of devotion. Vernacular narratives warned of the dangers of treating one's parents with disrespect and encouraged the listeners a life-long respect for mothers and mother-like figures. Buddhist rituals marking the period of adulthood of a young male emphasized gratitude and honor to the mother. A common metaphor found in popular Sinhalese verse and religious prose dating from medieval times is that of the Buddha as a caring, loving mother. In another example, vernacular post-canonical Pāli texts in several Theravādin countries mention a previous life of the Buddha in which he first conceived the idea of becoming a Buddha (Sanskrit: manopraṇidhānaya). The story depicts the Buddha-to-be as a filial and grateful son, which the text says is a habit of Buddhas-to-be in general. The mother is part of the reason the Buddha-to-be aspires to become a Buddha in a future life.

== Practice in the present day ==
The Discourse on the Difficulty in Paying the Debt to Parents is still popular in East Asia and is often referred to in preaching by monks. The story of the monk Mulian saving his beloved mother is still depicted in Chinese opera to this day, which is especially popular in the countryside. Throughout Asia, the Ghost Festival is still celebrated, though its importance is most felt in countries which have been influenced by both Buddhism and Confucianism.

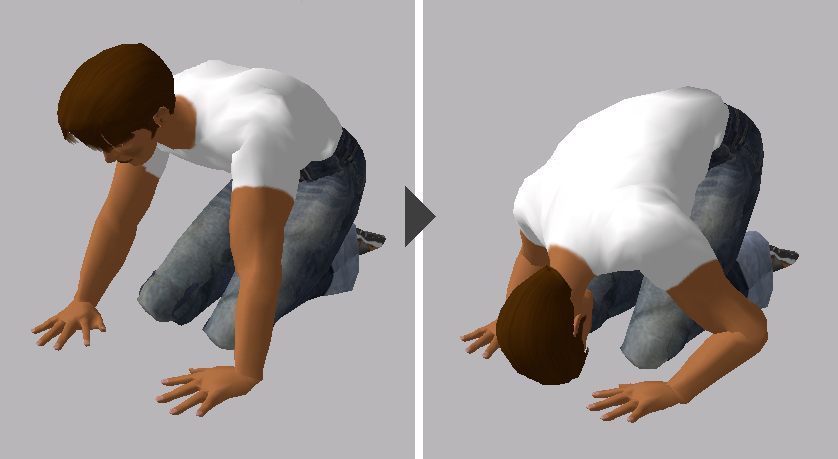
Among some Buddhists, there is a custom of prostrating to parents.

Filial piety is still an important part of moral education in Buddhist countries. It is an important value in a number of Asian cultures, some of which are based on Buddhism, such as Thailand. In the context of care-giving in Thailand, the parents of a child are compared to an enlightened Buddhist monk from the perspective of the family. The children of a parent are seen to have a relationship of bunkhun with the parents, which is a value that informs their filial piety, and gives it a sense of "respect, honor, fidelity, devotion, dutifulness, and sacrifice". Furthermore, there is a custom among Theravādin Buddhists in Asia for male children to temporarily become ordained as a Buddhist monks in order to dedicate the religious merit to their parents. (Note: For Thai Buddhists, see Falk (2007, p. 84). For other communities, see Bhikkhu (2010, pp. 251–2).) Having passed this rite is regarded by the Thai as a sign of maturity and as an expression of filial piety. in Thailand, women cannot receive full ordination, however, and therefore practice their filial role mostly economically. Even Thai women who emigrate abroad tend to still send money to their aging parents. The custom of sending money to one's parents is common among rural Thai, who often work in big cities to earn money. During the Thai New Year festival, gratitude is widely and publicly expressed as elderly parents are honored by gifts. Among Sri Lankans, commemoration of one's deceased parents is an important part of daily routine of many people. This may be done by a simple daily act of lighting incense. There still is a common expression among Sri Lankans that "the mother is the Buddha of the home".

Among some Buddhists, there is a custom of prostrating to parents. In a 2015 study among British teens who self-identify as Buddhist, 78% of heritage (ethnic) Buddhists indicated they prostrated to their parents, and 13% of convert Buddhist teens.
