= Mankeshwar Nath Mahadev Mandir =

Lord Shiva temple in Mithila

- मनकेश्वर नाथ महादेव मंदिर

Religion
- Affiliation: Hinduism
- Deity: Shiva

Location
- Location: Madhia Math, Sonbarsa block, Sitamarhi
- State: Bihar
- Country: India
- Interactive map of Mankeshwar Nath Mahadev Mandir
- Coordinates: 26.7623687°N 85.5920212°E

Architecture
- Founder: Shravan Kumar
- Established: Treta Yuga

Mankeshwar Nath Mahadev Mandir (Maithili: मनकेश्वर नाथ महादेव मंदिर) is a Hindu temple dedicated to Shiva in Madhia Math, also known as Madhia Dham, Sonbarsa block, Sitamarhi district, Bihar, India. It is a legendary temple associated with the epic Ramayana. According to legend, the temple was established by Shravana Kumara before the birth of Rama. It is said that Shravana Kumara installed a Shivalinga in the temple known as Baba Mankeshwar Nath Mahadev. The temple is popular among Shiva devotees for performing Jalabhisheka on the Shivalinga during the festival of Sawan Sombari.

== Etymology ==
The name Mankeshwar of the temple is derived from the Indic term Manokamna. The term Manokamna translates to "wishes from the heart". According to the Pandit Mukesh Giri of the temple, it is believed that the wishes of the devotees coming here are fulfilled, hence the Shivalinga installed here is known as Mankeshwar Nath Mahadev.
