= Shravana Kumara =

Ramayana character

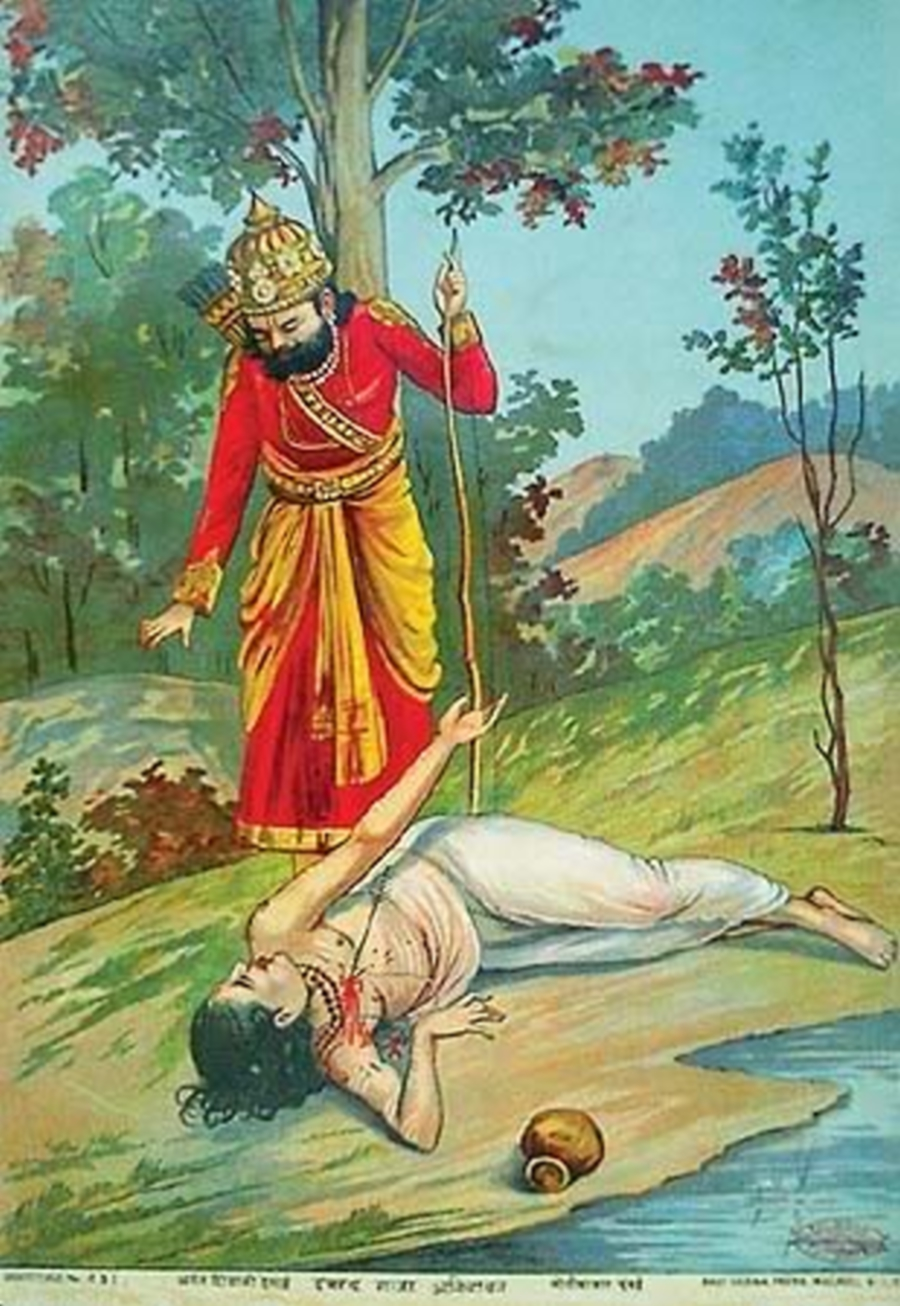
- A fallen Shravana and King Dasharatha
- Texts: Ramayana

Genealogy
- Parents: Shantanu (father); Jnanavanti (mother)

Shravan Kumara (Sanskrit: श्रवण कुमार) is a character mentioned in the ancient Hindu text Ramayana. He is best known for his filial piety towards his parents. He was killed accidentally by King Dasharatha.

== Life ==
Shravana Kumara's parents, Shantanu and Jnanavanti (Malaya), were hermits. They were both blind. When they became aged, Shravana wanted to take them to the four most sacred places of Hindu pilgrimage to purify the soul. Since Shravana Kumara could not afford the transport, he decided to put each parent in a basket and tie each basket to an end of a bamboo pole, which he would carry on his shoulder while on their pilgrimage.

According to Punjabi folklore, Shravana's mother was distantly related to King Dasharatha.

== Death ==
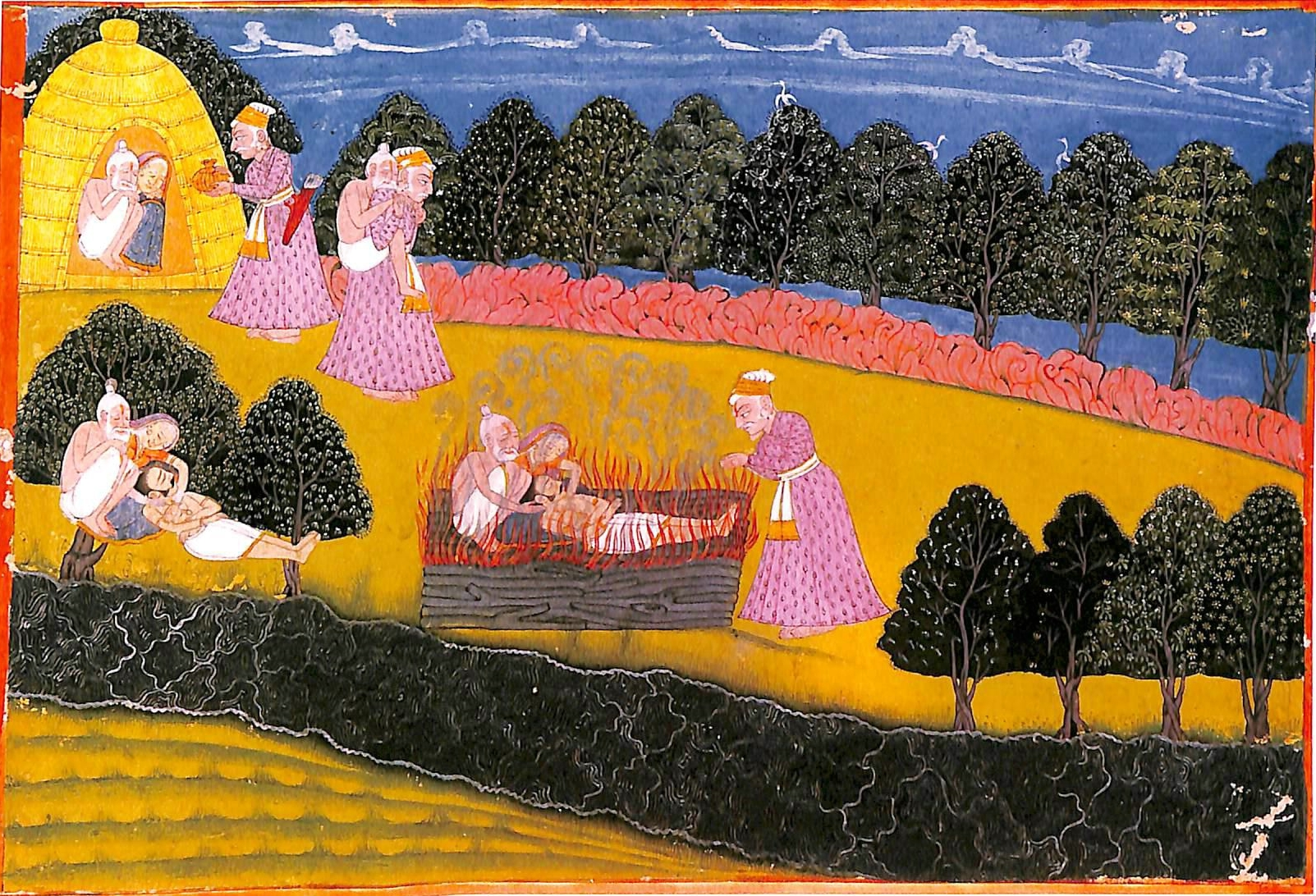
Dasharatha cremates Shravana and his parents (painting by Laharu of Chamba)

According to the Ramayana, while hunting in the forest of Ayodhya, King Dasharatha heard a sound near a lake and shot an arrow, hoping to hit an animal. When he crossed the lake to collect his kill, he found that his arrow had fatally struck a teenage boy who was bleeding. The injured boy was Shravana, who then told Dasharatha he had come to the lake to collect water for his sick and aged parents, who were both blind and whom he had been carrying on a sling. With his dying breath, Shravana requested Dasharatha to take water to his parents and to tell them what happened.

Shravana then succumbed to his wounds. When Dasharatha took water for his parents and told them of his tragic mistake, they were unable to bear the shock. Despite acknowledging that it was an accident, they cursed Dasharatha that he too would experience 'Putrashoka' (Sanskrit, 'putra' is child/son and 'shoka' is sorrow, or grief; grief due to loss of a son). Thus, Shravana's sick and thirsty parents died without drinking water.

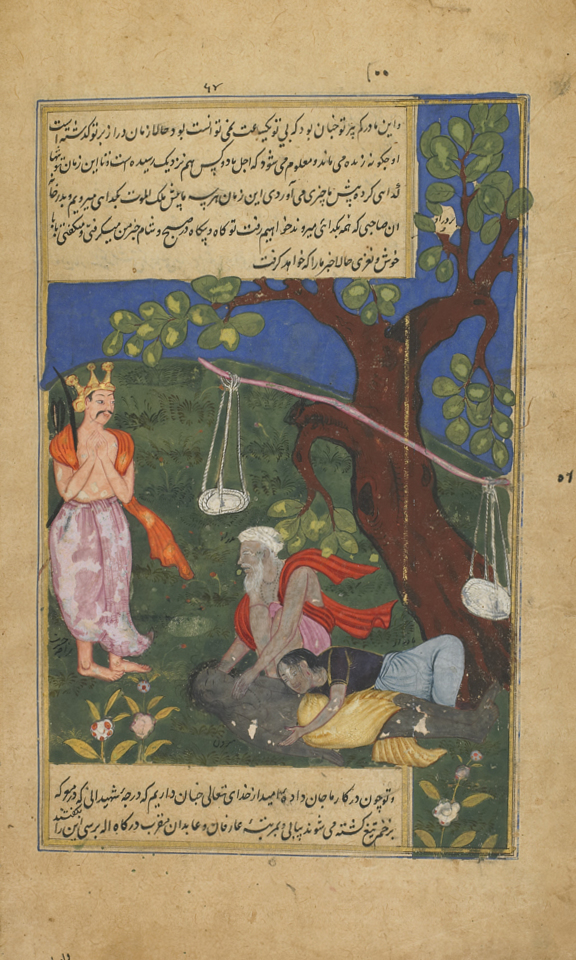
The blind hermit and his wife mourn their son, who was slain accidentally by Dasarath.

This curse came true when King Dasharatha died without seeing his eldest and most beloved son, Rama, who had to be exiled at the former's own orders (upon the wishes of the latter's step-mother, queen Kaikeyi).

== Legacy ==
Local tradition holds that the place where Shravana died was named Sarvan in Unnao district of Uttar Pradesh in India, and the spot where Dasharatha shot his arrow came to be known as Sarwara and the place where Shravana's parents died is called Samadha. An old and dilapidated memorial for Shravana on the banks of the lake is now withering away.

While local tradition holds that the place where Shravana died was named Sarvan in Unnao district of Uttar Pradesh, another significant tradition places the event around the Darvan Lake in Ambedkar Nagar district, approximately 80 kilometers from Ayodhya. Nearby villages like Serva and Savana are believed to be the spots associated with the story. This region also has a notable site called Shravan Dhaam, which is being developed to commemorate the legend. Unlike the Unnao location which lacks a significant body of water, the presence of the Darvan Lake aligns with the classical narrative where Shravana went to fetch water for his blind parents.

== Shrine ==
Mukhed in Nanded district of Maharashtra has a samadhi dedicated to Shravana. In the region of Mithila in India, there is a legendary temple associated with Shravan Kumar. The temple is known as Mankeshwar Nath Mahadev Mandir.

== See also ==
- Hindu text
- Kosala kingdom
- Sarayu
- Syama Jataka
