= Mouzi Lihuolun =

Classic Chinese Buddhist work

The Mouzi Lihuolun (simplified Chinese: 牟子理惑论; traditional Chinese: 牟子理惑論; pinyin: Móuzǐ lǐhuòlùn; Wade–Giles: Mou-tzu Li-huo-lün; lit. 'Master Mou's Treatise Settling Doubts') is a classic Chinese Buddhist text. It comprises a purportedly autobiographical preface by Master Mou, a late 2nd-century Confucian scholar-official who converted to Buddhism, and an imaginary dialogue of questions and answers about Buddhist practices. The date and Authorship of the text is widely debated, historians proposing dates ranging from the early centuries of Buddhism in China to the later Six Dynasties period.

== Title ==
The Mouzi lihuolun is known under several names, including the abbreviated title Mouzi.

Mouzi compounds the uncommon Chinese surname Mou 牟 "seek; obtain" with the suffix -zi 子 "Master" (compare Laozi). The Japanese title Bōshi riwakuron 牟氏理惑論 (Chinese Moushi lihuolun) replaces shi (zi) "Master" with shi (shi) 氏 "Mister; a certain person." Lihuolun combines li 理 "manage; put in order; acknowledge"; huo 惑 "confusion; delusion; doubt; suspicion"; and lun 論 "discourse; opinion; dissertation; essay."

According to Yu Jiaxi 余嘉錫, the original title Mouzi jihuolun 牟子治惑論 – with zhi 治 "rule; research; manage; cure; eliminate" instead of li – was changed to avoid the naming taboo on Emperor Gaozong of Tang's personal name Zhi 治.

English translations of Mouzi lihuolun include:

- "Mou-tzu on the Settling of Doubts"
- "Mou-tzu's Treatise on the Removal of Doubt" or "…Elimination of Delusion"
- "Master Mou’s Treatise for the Removal of Doubts"
- "Mouzi's Correction of Errors"

Some renditions of shortened Lihuolun are:

- "Disposing of Error"
- "Dispelling Doubts"
- "The Removal of Doubts"

== Content ==
The received Mouzi Lihuolun text contains a supposedly autobiographical Introduction, thirty-seven articles of Dialogue between Mouzi and an unnamed Chinese critic (or critics) questioning Buddhist practices, and a Postscript in which the critic converts to Buddhism.

The Introduction identifies the author as an Eastern Han dynasty Confucian scholar who is not mentioned in any Han-era historical records. (Later editions give the name of Mou Rong 牟融. Compare the Tang dynasty scholar also named Mou Rong 牟融.) After the death of Emperor Ling of Han in 189 CE, scholars, especially specialists of immortality fled the chaotic Yellow Turban Rebellion and moved to the extreme south of the empire, where Mouzi argued with them. Although very admirative of the Laozi, Mouzi, as he appears in the autobiographical introduction, was very hostile to immortality practices. He himself was born in Cangwu in Jiaozhou (present day Tonkin), where he studied the Confucian Classics, the Laozi and Buddhism.

The 37 Mouzi Dialogues treat early Chinese objections to Buddhism, such as coming from a foreign "barbarian" culture, not being mentioned in the Chinese classics, and the doctrine of reincarnation negating Daoist "immortality".

Haircutting exemplified Chinese/Buddhist cultural problems. Buddhist tonsure required monks to shave their heads – but Confucian filial piety prohibited Chinese adults from cutting their hair (because it was ultimately a gift from one's parents). In Article 9, "Filial Piety and Buddhist Practice", the interlocutor quotes the Classic of Filial Piety, as does Master Mou along with the Analects.

The questioner said, "The Classic of Filiality says, 'Our body, limbs, hair, and skin are all received from our fathers and mothers. We dare not injure them.' When Zengzi was about to die, he bared his hands and feet [to show them intact from harm]. But now the monks shave their heads. How this violates the sayings of the sages and is out of keeping with the way of the filial! …"
Mouzi said, … "Confucius has said, 'There are those with whom one can pursue the Way … but with whom one cannot weigh [decisions].' This is what is meant by doing what is best at the time. Furthermore, the Classic of Filiality says, 'The early kings ruled by surpassing virtue and the essential Way.' Taibo cut his hair short and tattooed his body, thus following of his own accord the [foreign] customs of Wu and Yue and going against the spirit of the 'body, limbs, hair, and skin' passage. And yet Confucius praised him, saying that his might well be called the ultimate virtue."

The Mouzi text frequently explains Buddhism in Daoist terms; for instance, it calls Buddhism the Fodao 佛道 "Buddha Dao". Keenan said the author's rhetorical strategy was "to graft the new branch of the Buddha Tao onto the trunk of classical Chinese culture, which is represented for him by the Confucian classics and the works of classical Taoism." To Mouzi, Daoism included the philosophical Daodejing and Zhuangzi but excluded Xuanxue "Neo-Daoism" and xian "transcendent; immortal" practices. For example, Article 30, "Fasting: Buddhist and Daoist", dismisses bigu 辟穀 "abstention from grains (in order to gain immortality)".

A critic asked: Among the Taoists, some abstain from eating grain, yet they drink their wine and eat their meat. They claim that this is the method of Lao-tzu. But the Buddha Tao considers wine and meat to be absolutely prohibited, while it does allow one to eat grain. Why such a stark difference?
Mou-tzu said: Such doctrines are trivial and trifling. None of their ninety-six teachings surpasses the Buddha in tranquility and nonaction. I have inspected the two sections of the Lao Tzu and have heard of his prohibition against the five tastes, but I have never found any place where he says that we should stop eating the five grains. The sage [i.e., Confucius] has arranged the text of the Seven Classics, but they contain no method of abstaining from grains. Lao wrote the Five Thousand Words but there is no mention of avoiding grains. The sage says, "Those who eat grain are wise; those who eat grasses are fools. Those who eat meat are violent. Those who feed on the air are long-lived."

"Ninety-six teachings" refers to the Buddhist Anguttara Nikaya's reckoning of heterodox teachings. The Five Grains and Five Tastes are aspects of Wuxing "Five Phases" theory.

In the Postscript ("The Thirty-seven Factors"), the interlocutory critic decides to take Buddhist lay vows because Mouzi's answers had resolved all doubts. The Postscript relates the 37 Mouzi articles with the 37 Buddhist Bodhipakkhiyādhammā factors of enlightenment and Daoist chapters 1–37 of the Daodejing (known as the Daojing section).

A critic asked: Your understanding is truly comprehensive, and assuredly we have never heard the like. But why do you limit yourself to these thirty-seven articIes? Do you have a model?

Mou-tzu said: Tumbleweeds drifted about and cartwheels were invented. Hollow wood floated and boats and oars were made. A spider spun his web and fine nets were woven. Bird prints were seen and written words were devised. Thus it is easy to complete a task with a model but difficult to do so without one. I have examined how the essence of the Buddha's scriptures have thirty-seven factors of awakening and how Lao-tzu's classic on the Tao also has thirty-seven chapters. These are my models.

When the doubters heard this, they became nervously deferential, paled, clasped their hands together, and backed away from their mats. Shrinking back in humility and prostrating themselves, they said, "We are really backward and blind persons, born into a benighted backwater. We have presumed to utter foolish words and have not distinguished happiness from sorrow. But now, upon hearing your pronouncements, as suddenly as hot water melts the snow, we beg to change our feelings, cleanse our minds, and reform ourselves. May we please receive the five precepts and become lay followers?"

Upāsaka and Upāsikā male and female Buddhist lay devotees take vows to follow the Five Precepts code of ethics.

== History ==
Scholars disagree over the historicity of Mouzi and the Lihuolun. According to the Dutch sinologist Erik Zürcher, "The early history of the text (if it had one) is wholly obscure; the treatise is neither mentioned nor quoted anywhere before the second half of the fifth century."

The earliest catalog of Buddhist literature, Dao An's (374) Zongli zhongjing mulu 總理眾經目錄 "Bibliographical Catalog Comprehensively Arranging the Sutra", does not mention the Mouzi Lihuolun. It was first recorded in the (c. 465) Falun 法論 "Dharma Discourse", Lu Cheng 陸澄's collection of Buddhist literature compiled for the devout Emperor Ming of Liu Song. Although the Falun is lost, its table of contents is included in Sengyou's (515) Chu sanzang jiji 出三藏記集 "Collection of Records on the Translated Tripitaka". Sengyou also edited the (517) Hongmingji 弘明集 "Collection Aggrandizing and Clarifying [Buddhism]", which is the earliest source for the transmitted Mouzi text. Another early Mouzi Lihouhun reference is found in the Shishuo Xinyu commentary by Liu Chun 劉峻 (426–521). The text was later canonized as part of the Chinese Buddhist Canon.

Scholars have expressed diverse opinions about the Mouzi lihuolun date of composition.

Many considered the text authentic and accepted that Mouzi composed it sometime between the final years of the Later Han dynasty (25–220 CE) and the middle of the Three Kingdoms period (220–280). They include eminent scholars such as Sun Yirang, Hu Shih, Paul Pelliot, and Henri Maspero. Maspero dated the Mouzi from around 250 because its story of the Buddha's life (Article 1) was probably copied from that of Zhi Qian's (c. 229) Taizi ruiying benqi jing 太子瑞應本起經 translation. The Japanese scholar Fukui Kōjun 福井康順 (1898–1991) reexamined these various theories and concluded that the Mouzi lihuolun text was written around the middle of the 3rd century.

Other scholars have rejected the Mouzi as a spurious work that was falsely attributed to Mouzi. Hu Yinglin 胡應麟 (1551–1602) was first to deny the textual authenticity, and suggested that a scholar forged it during the Six Dynasties period (222–589). Liang Qichao considered it a falsification dating from the Eastern Jin dynasty (317–420) or Liu Song dynasty (420–479). The Japanese Buddhologist Tokiwa Daijō 常盤大定 (1929–1945) argued that the text was concocted by the monk Huitong 慧通 (c. 426-c. 478), who is mentioned in Gu Huan 顧歡's Yixia lun 夷夏論 Daoist criticism of Buddhism. Tokiwa believed that Huitong or another later author created "Mozi" as an imaginary figure with a historical background linking him with some events and personalities known from other sources. Zürcher supported Tokiwa's argument by pointing out that the Preface's tone was too eulogistic to be autobiographical. "Who could believe that a Chinese scholar would … claim that he 'has a complete understanding of civil as well as military affairs, and the talent to react independently (to any situation)'?" He concluded that the Preface is "an idealized description of the scholar-official who leads a retired life far from the bustle of the world."

Most Chinese and foreign academics have interpreted the Mouzi lihuolun as an early Chinese Buddhist apologetic, for instance Maspero called Mouzi the "first apologist for Buddhism." Keenan controverted this apologistic assumption because the text focuses more upon reinterpreting Chinese traditions than upon defending Buddhist teachings.

The argument is not over Buddhism itself, but over the validity of a Buddhist interpretation of the Chinese classics. The Li-huo lun is not, then, a Buddhist apologetic arguing for the doctrinal truth of Buddhism over against the Chinese traditions, but rather a culturally Chinese hermeneutic about how to interpret China's classical tradition, about the validity of a Buddhist hermeneutic of its classics. It is hermeneutics, not apologetics.

Chan and Lo noted the treatise's ultimate reason for adhering to Buddhism "lies in a deliberate calculation of moral reward, rather than a genuine faith in Buddhist dharma per se."

Western language translations of the Mouzi lihuolun include French by Paul Pelliot and English by John P. Keenan, who employed reader-response criticism.

== Historical Context ==
Succeeding the fall of the Han dynasty, China experienced significant changes in its intellectual and religious landscapes, including the development of new philosophical Ideas such as Xuanxue beside traditional Confucianism and Taoism. Buddhism also grew in this changing environment, interacting with Chinese traditions and intellectuals being framed through concepts recognized by Chinese audiences. The Mouzi Lihuolun depicts this intellectual environment through its connection with Chinese classical traditions. Rather than just displaying Buddhist doctrine, the text replies to common questions and worries about Buddhism by drawing upon traditional Chinese intellectual concepts.

== See also ==
- Filial piety in Buddhism
- Milinda Pañha
