= Wat Chomphuwek =

Buddhist temple in Thailand

Coordinates: 13°53′12.12″N 100°29′47.04″E

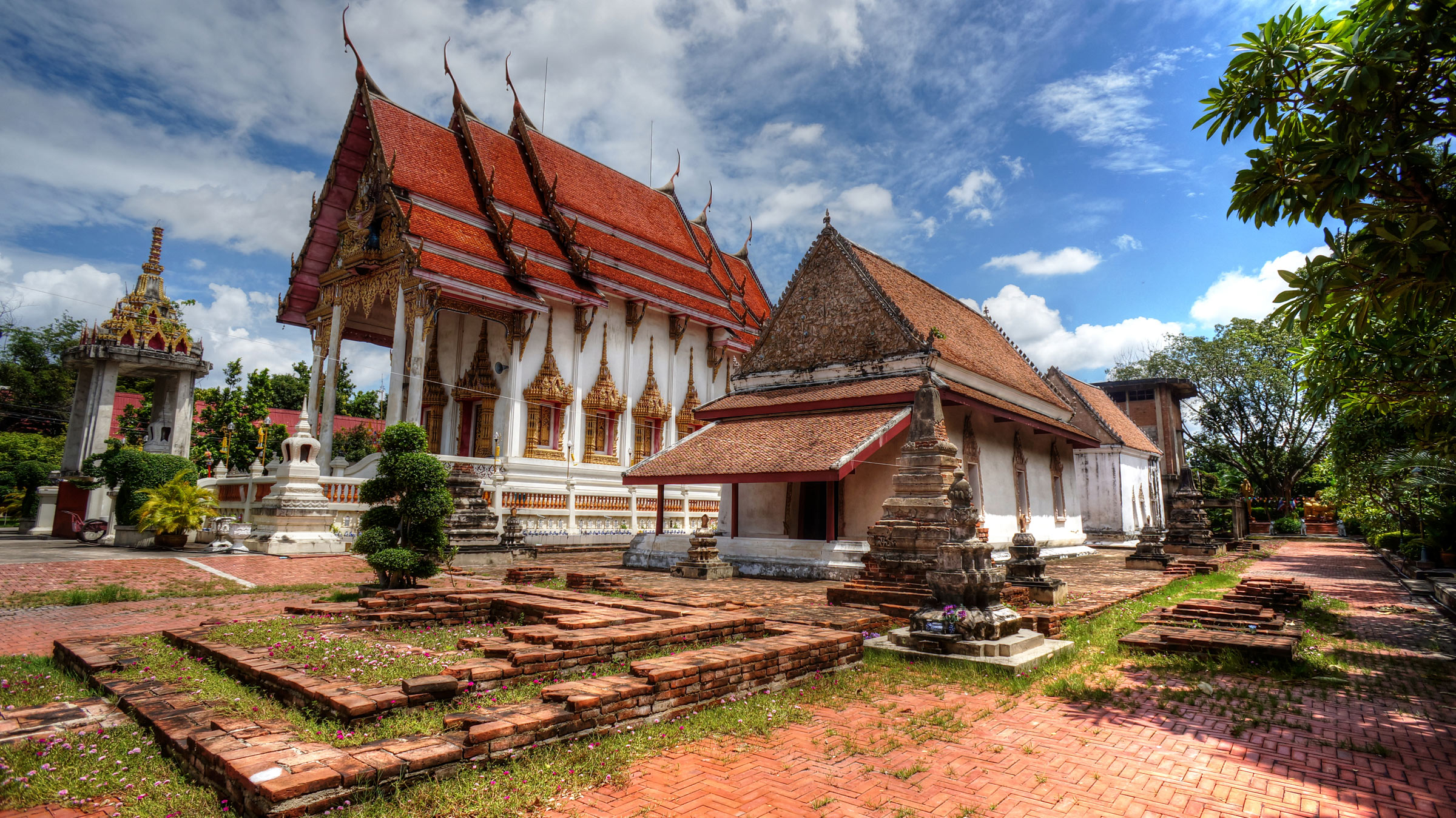
The old ordination hall.

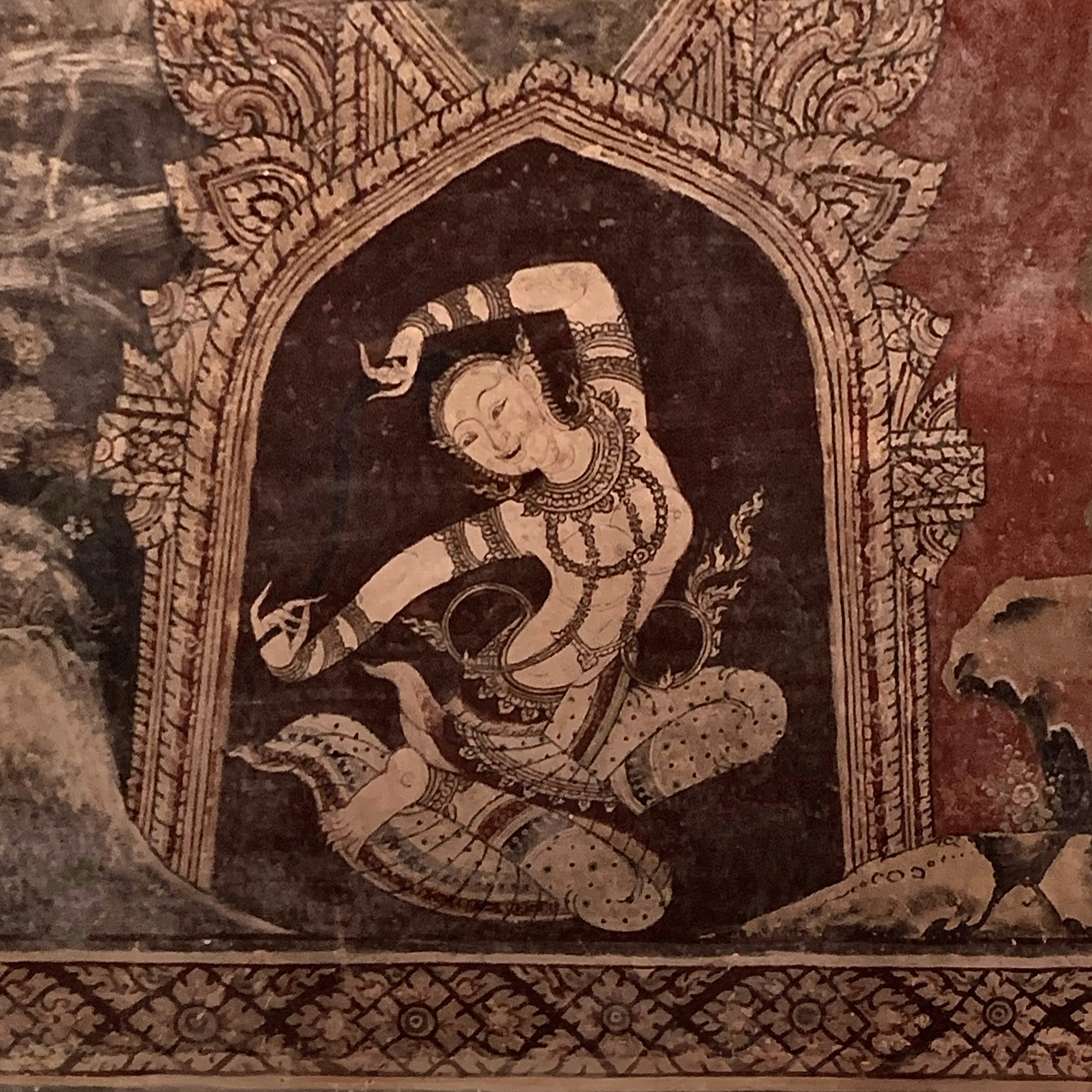
Mural of Phra Mae Thorani.

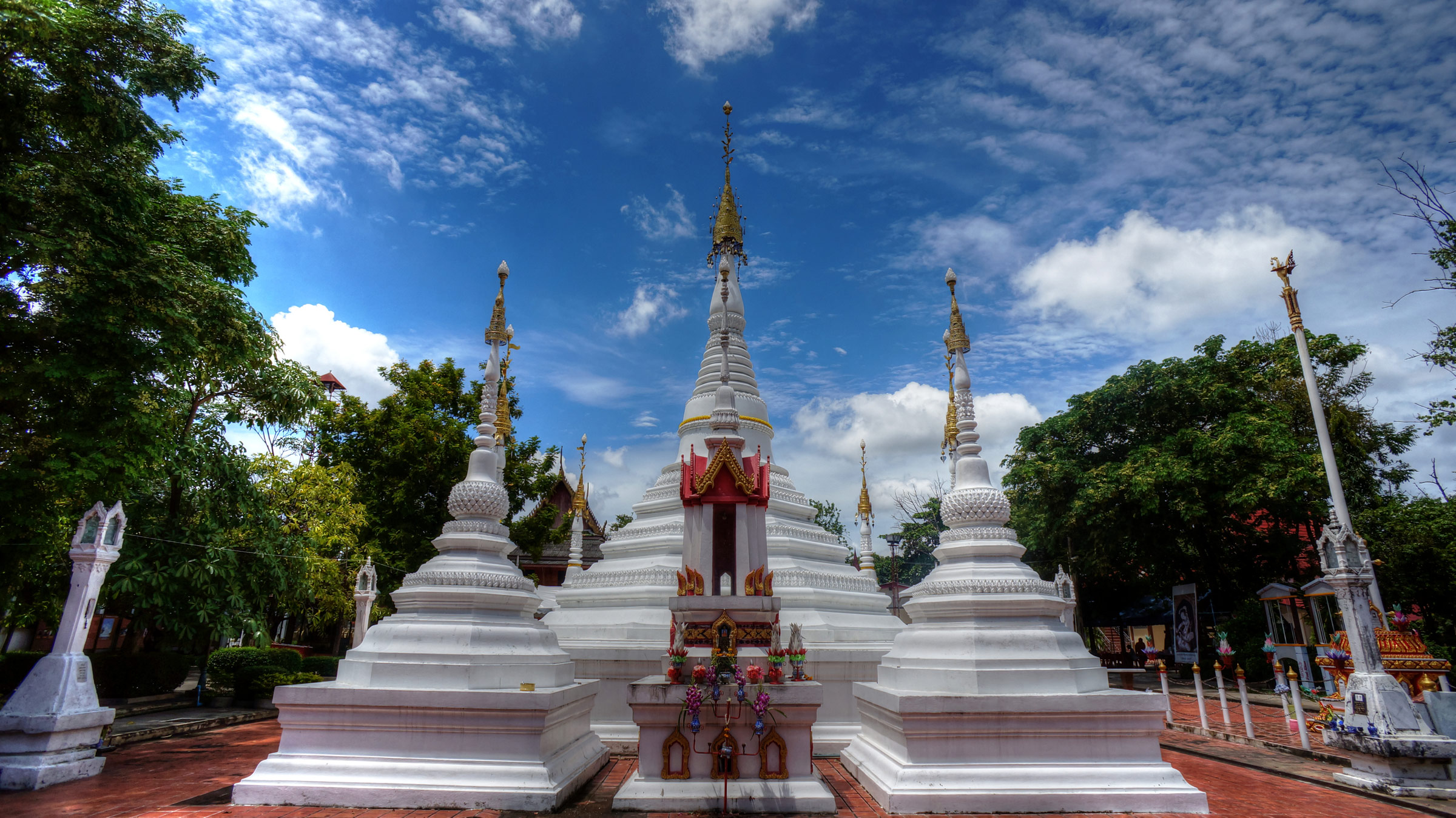
Phra Mu Tao (center) with two minor other chedi.

Wat Chomphuwek (Thai: วัดชมภูเวก, pronounced [wát t͡ɕʰōm.pʰūː wêːk]; also spelled: Wat Chumpoo Wek) is a civil Thai Buddhist temple in Mahā Nikāya sect, located on Soi Nonthaburi 33, Sanam Bin Nam Road, Tambon Tha Sai, Amphoe Mueang Nonthaburi, Nonthaburi Province, central Thailand. It is considered one of the oldest and most prominent temples in Nonthaburi, that it is over 350 years old as well as the murals and architectures are considered very beautiful.

== History ==
Wat Chomphuwek is a monastery that was believed to have been built by a Mon monk named "Poh Phu Si Chomphu" (พ่อปู่ศรีชมภู) in the late Ayutthaya period corresponding to the reign of King Narai the Great around the year 1682. Originally, it was called "Wat Chomphuwiwek" (วัดชมภูวิเวก) but later people popularly called "Wat Chomphuwek" until now.

Its name means "Lonely Temple of Chomphu", or may translate as "High Temple of Chomphu" because it is located on upland.

== Highlights ==
The wall in the old ordination hall is decorated with mural painting describing the Ten Great Birth Stories of the Buddha. The highlight is mural painting of Phra Mae Thorani (goddess of the earth according to Buddhist beliefs) twisting her hair above the entrance, which is praised to be the most beautiful Phra Mae Thorani mural in the world with Nonthaburi school.

Another highlight is chedi (Buddhist pagoda) built with Mon-style called "Phra Mu Tao" (พระมุเตา), it is assumed to be constructed in year 1917. Buddha relics are believed to be found inside.

The Fine Arts Department registered the temple as a national ancient monument in 1974 and is considered a learning center for the historic sites of Nonthaburi Province as well.
