= Buddhist devotion =

Devotional practices of Buddhists

Devotion, a central practice in Buddhism, refers to commitment to religious observances or to an object or person, and may be translated with Sanskrit or Pāli terms like saddhā, gārava or pūjā. Central to Buddhist devotion is the practice of Buddhānussati, the recollection of the inspiring qualities of the Buddha. Although buddhānussati was an important aspect of practice since Buddhism's early period, its importance was amplified with the arising of Mahāyāna Buddhism. Specifically, with Pure Land Buddhism, many forms of devotion were developed to recollect and connect with the celestial Buddhas, especially Amitābha.

Most Buddhists use ritual in pursuit of their spiritual aspirations. Common devotional practices are receiving a blessing, making merit, making a resolution, prostrating, making offerings, chanting, confession and repentance, and pilgrimage. Moreover, many types of visualizations, recollections and mantras are used in Buddhist meditation in different traditions to devote oneself to a Buddha, bodhisattva, or a teacher / guru. The often politically motivated practice of self-immolation is a less common aspect of devotion in some Buddhist communities.

Buddhist devotional practices can be performed at home or in a temple, in which images of Buddhas, bodhisattvas and enlightened disciples are located. Buddhist devotion is practiced more intensively on the uposatha observation days and on yearly festivals, which are different depending on region and tradition.

== Definition ==
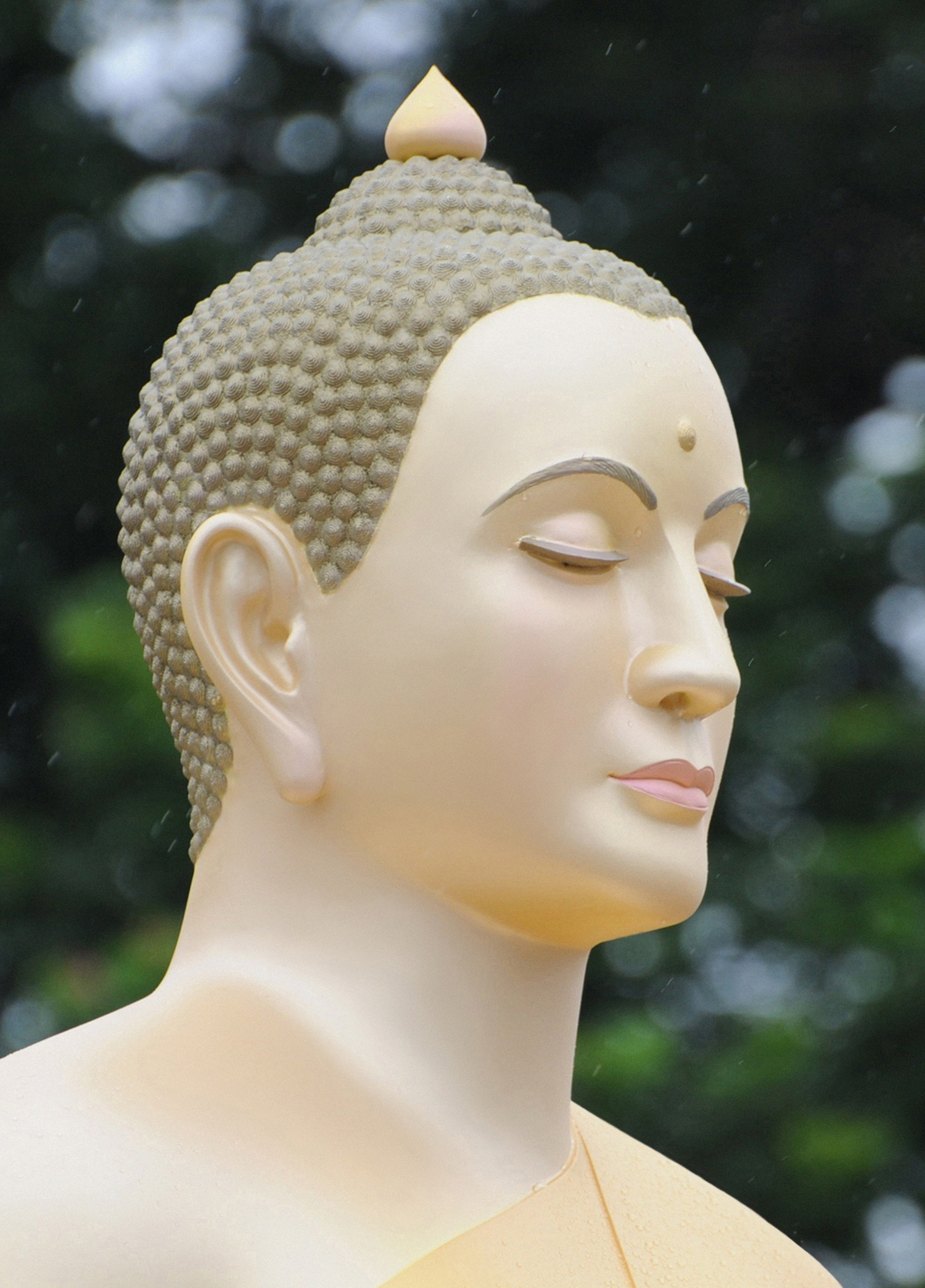
Head of a Buddha statue

The term devotion in the context of Buddhism is defined by Sri Lankan scholar Indumathie Karunaratna as "the fact or quality of being devoted to religious observances or a solemn dedication to an object or a person". It is covered in the Pali language by terms such as pema (affection), saddhā (faith or belief), pasāda (serene confidence), bhatti (faith) and gārava (respect). Pema is often used in the initial attraction a student feels for his spiritual teacher; saddhā is deeper, although still considered an initial step on the spiritual path. Saddhā and gārava might inspire a layperson to ordain as a monk, whereas saddhā and pema may help a devotee to attain a good afterlife destination. Bhatti in early Buddhism has the meaning of 'faithful adherence to the [Buddhist] religion', but in later texts, it develops the meaning of an advanced form of devotion.

Apart from these terms, the term pūjā is also used for expressions of "honor, worship and devotional attention". Pūjā is derived from the Vedic root pūj-, meaning 'to revere, to honor'. According to the Pāli Studies scholar M.M.J Marasinghe, in the Theravāda Pāli Canon, it did not have the meaning of ritual offering yet. It did include honoring through physical, verbal and mental ways. The term pūjā originated with Dravidian culture, in which it may have been used for a ritual or an element of ritual procedure, and these ritual connotations may have affected Buddhism at a later period. According to anthropologist William Tuladhar-Douglas, however, the root pūj- had a ritual meaning from the early Buddhist period.

Devotion is expressed through the three doors of action (body, speech and mind).

=== Goal ===
Although in traditional texts devotional acts are sometimes not considered part of the path to enlightenment itself, they are considered a way to prepare oneself for the development of this path. It is regarded as a form of giving, which is done for both one's own benefit and that of the other. In many Buddhist societies, devotional practices are engaged in because of this-life benefits (healing, exorcism of malevolent spirits), because of karmic pursuits (accumulating good karma for the next lives to come) and because the devotee would like to attain Nirvana.

== History ==
In early Buddhism, it was a common practice to recollect the qualities of the Buddha, known as buddhānussati. In the period of the arising of Mahāyāna Buddhism, there was a growing sense of loss in Buddhist communities with regard to the passing away of the Buddha, and a growing desire to be able to meet him again. These developments led to the arising of faith-based forms of Buddhism such as Pure Land Buddhism, in which the practice of buddhānussati involved celestial Buddhas such as the Amitābha Buddha. Devotional practices became commonplace, as new techniques were developed to recollect the qualities and magnificence of the celestial Buddhas, such as visualization and chants. Scholars have identified Buddhaghosa, who played a major role in shaping the Pali canon, as steering the tradition away from bhakti and image use in favor of meditation. However, by the 7th century, devotional practices were standardized in at least one institution: Nalanda.

In modern times, Buddhist devotion has changed in many ways. Traditional days of observance can no longer be maintained in the same way due to the introduction of a seven-day workweek, and chants and other practices have been abridged or standardized to adapt to modern society. Goods offered in devotion have been commercialized. Nevertheless, devotional practices still continue to exist and evolve. Today, most Buddhists use ritual in pursuit of their spiritual aspirations.

== Object of devotion ==
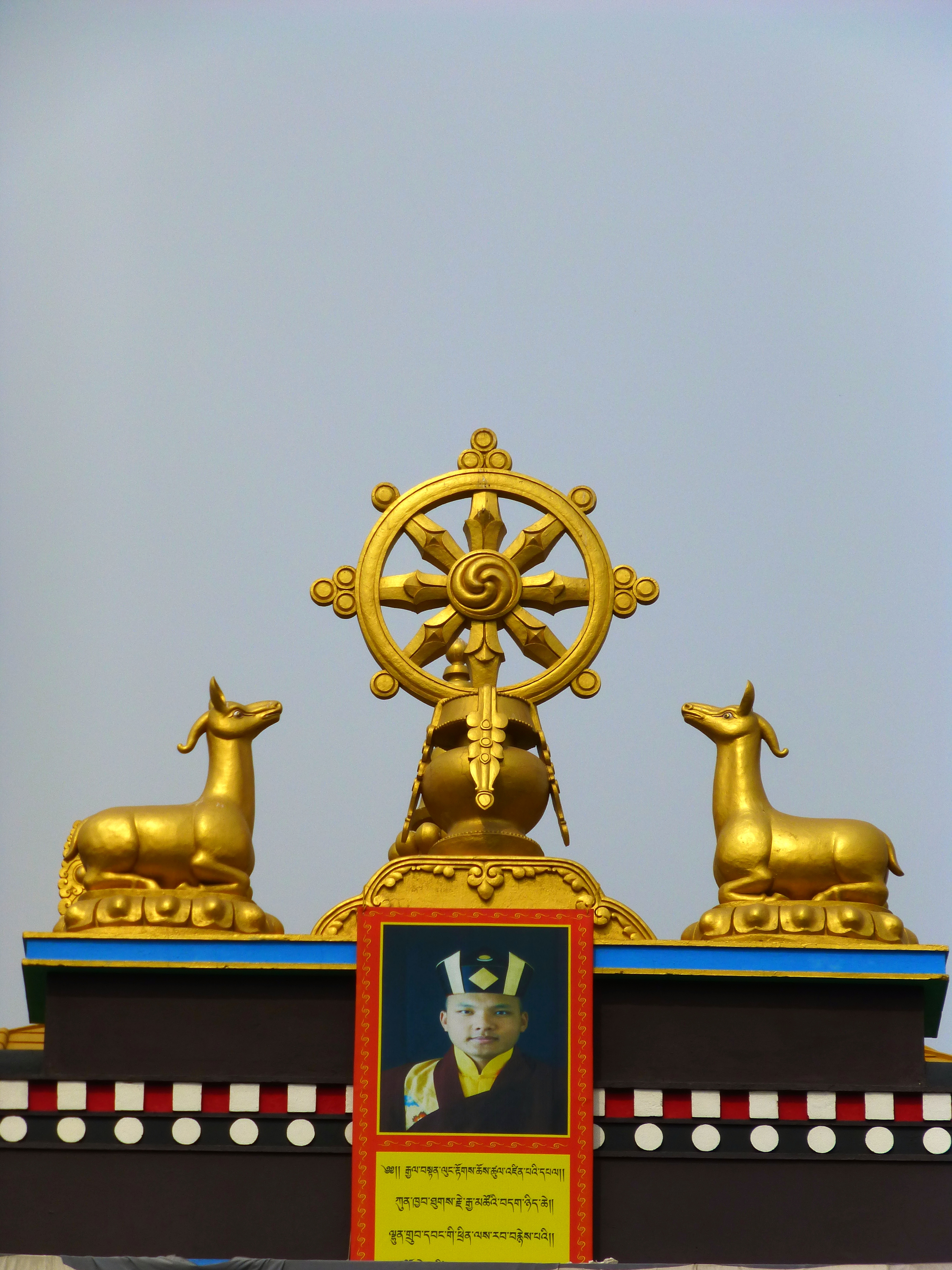
Symbols for the Triple Gem have been used throughout Buddhist history, including the Wheel of the Dhamma.

An important idea in Buddhist devotional practice is that good qualities of mind can be developed by association with someone or something linked to high spiritual attainment. In Buddhist devotion the Triple Gem, that is the Buddha, his teaching (Sanskrit: Dharma, Pali: Dhamma), and his community (Sanskrit: Saṃgha, Pali: Saṇgha) are mostly honored. Other symbols have also been used throughout Buddhist history, including the lotus flower, the Wheel of the Dhamma, the Bodhi Tree and the stupa. Sometimes, devotees also pay honor to foot prints believed to have been left behind by Gautama Buddha or a previous Buddha. Buddhist devotion is also directed to inanimate objects considered sacred such as stūpas (hemispherical structures containing relics) or Buddhist texts (Sanskrit: sūtra; Pali: sutta). Sutras are Buddhist texts seen as the body of the Dharma or the body of the Buddha. In Burmese Buddhism, devotion to the Buddha is seen to bear fruits, not because the Buddha is seen to respond to the devotion, but rather because of the spiritual power inherent in his words or relics, and because of the merit of the worship itself.

However, this does not mean that deities have no role in Buddhist devotion: they do, but are usually put on a subordinate level with the Buddha at the top of the spiritual hierarchy. In Tibetan Buddhism, the devotional life has significantly been influenced by pre-Buddhist devotion to deities and spirits.

Early Buddhist literature includes stories of kings using images of the Buddha as substitutes for the Buddha's form. There are many tales that reflect a desire to similarly see the Buddha's body. Buddhists texts link creating images of the Buddha to gaining benefits such as majesty, large families, merit, and nirvana.

== Practices ==
Devotion has an important place in Buddhism. Devotion is developed through several practices, expressed through physical movement, speech, and mind.

In Theravāda Buddhism, devotional ceremonies can be classified as ceremonies for making merit (doing good deeds, e.g. offerings to monks), ceremonies to ward off danger (e.g. chanting certain Buddhist texts) and ceremonies adapted from folk religion. Almost all lay practices are focused on making merit, and gaining a personal spiritual benefit is, therefore, an important part of Buddhist devotion.

In Mahāyāna Buddhism, it is common to combine several devotional practices in one three-fold or seven-fold ceremony. In the threefold ceremony, practitioners will confess their wrongdoings and rejoice in the goodness that others have done. Thirdly, either merits are dedicated to other living beings, or the Buddhas are requested to keep on teaching for the benefit of the world. In the seven-fold series, all four of these practices are also engaged in, plus an obeisance and an offering are given, and the Buddhas are requested to not yet leave the world to go to final Nirvana. These ceremonies, whether three- or sevenfold, often precede a meditation session. Several elevenfold series are also known, which also include going for refuge, upholding the five ethical precepts and reminding oneself of the aim of enlightenment for all living beings. The ceremonies are described in several Mahāyāna sūtras, among which the Avataṃsaka Sūtra and the Gandavyūha.

=== Blessing ===
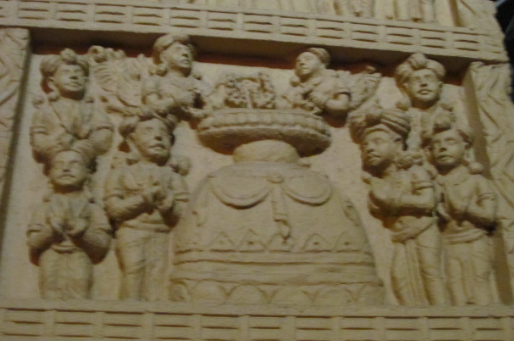
Replica of an image at the Sanchi gate at Chaitya Bhoomi, which shows a devotion scene involving a Buddhist stupa

In Buddhism, ceremonies are meant to provide a blessing. A Buddhist practitioner may engage in devotional practices to ask for blessings from a Buddha or enlightened being. Monks and nuns are also believed to be able to convey spiritual power by giving a blessing (Sanskrit: adhiṣṭhāna, Pali: adhiṭṭhāna) through chanting, a blessed object or some other means. The spiritual power of monastics is considered to come from their ordination lineage and virtue. In expressing faith and devotion to a Buddha or other spiritually advanced being, devotees may also ask for repentance to help free themselves from the retribution of bad karma or as an exercise for self-improvement.

Sometimes a distinction is made between the direct, visible help a Buddha gave to a disciple, for example, by giving encouragement, and the hidden powers that a Buddha had and still has, which he also uses to help living beings. These hidden powers can refer to psychic powers, or it can also refer to the power gained when a practitioner invokes the Buddha's name.

=== Merit-making and resolve ===
Merit is an energy that can be accumulated through merit-making practices, often performed with people who are considered to have the spiritual power to give blessings, like monastics. This energy can also be directed at a goal chosen, through a resolve (Sanskrit: praṇidhāna, Pali: paṇidhāna) often made. Such a resolve may be focused on this-worldly goals such as health, intelligence, protection from harm, but also goals that are less mundane, such as rebirth in heaven, rebirth in a Pure Land, and enlightenment. Throughout history, these resolves have often been recorded on materials like stone.

It is also believed that merit can be transferred to other living beings to help them, or transferred to a deity, who is expected to help in return. Finally, it is believed merit can help to weaken the effects of bad karma.

=== Prostration ===
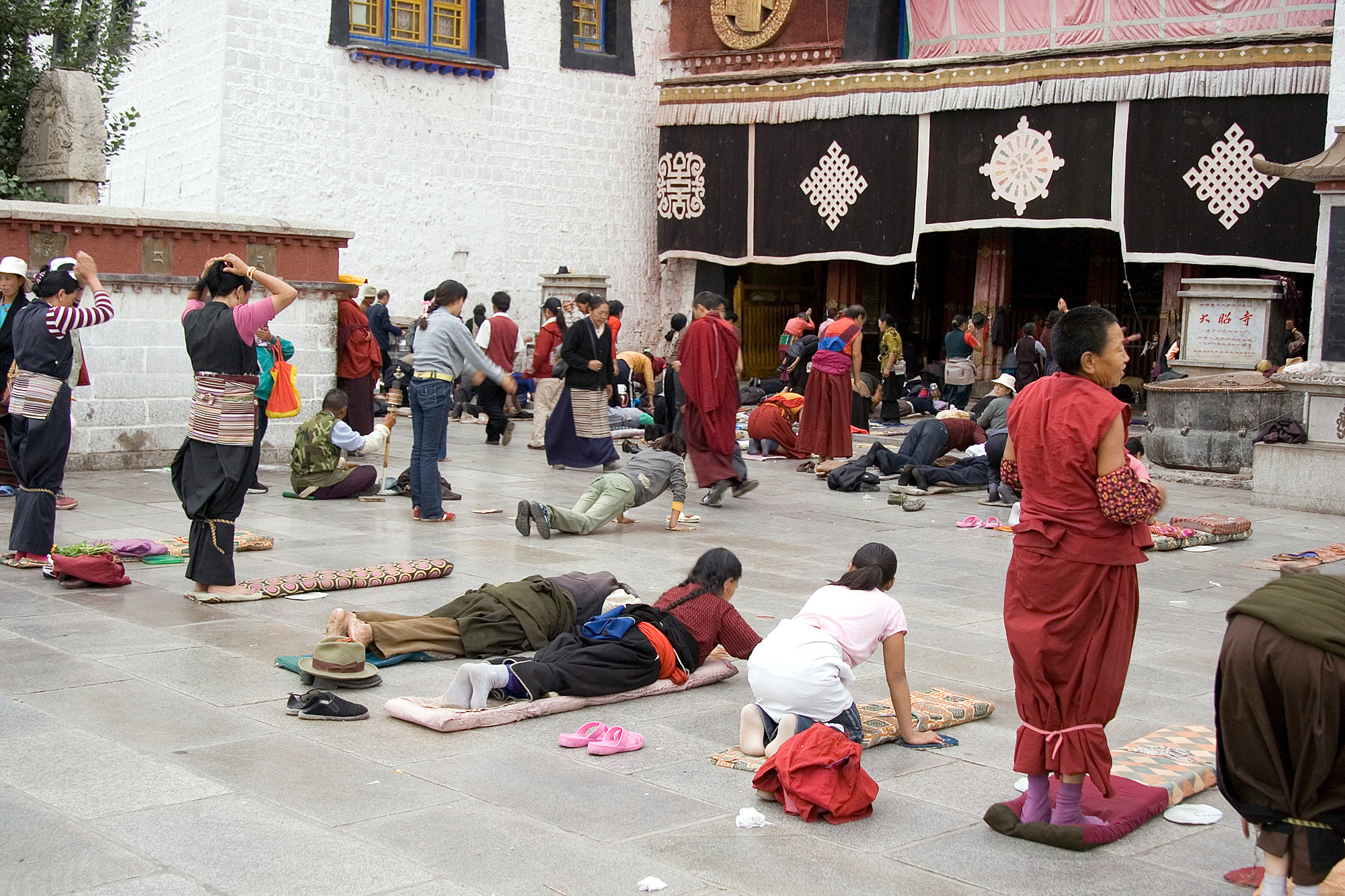
Prostration is done as an expression of humility and an acknowledgement of the other's spiritual experience.

In Buddhism, prostration is performed in several situations. Buddhists may prostrate for images of Gotama Buddha, and in Mahāyāna Buddhism also to other Buddhas and bodhisattvas. Devotion towards bodhisattvas is focused on their compassion, their skill and extraordinary powers. Apart from that, lay devotees may prostrate for a stūpa or a Bodhi Tree (a tree of the same type that the Buddha became enlightened under), but also to a monastic, or sometimes a religious teacher of some kind. They may also prostrate to their parents or to their elders. Monastics will prostrate for a monk ordained earlier, but female monastics are expected to prostrate to all male monastics, regardless of date of ordination.

Prostration is done as an expression of humility and an acknowledgement of the other's spiritual experience. It is usually done three times, to pay respect to the Buddha, the Dharma and the Saṁgha. The prostration is done by holding the hands in front of the chest and bringing them to the different parts of the upper body, to indicate paying respect by the three gates of action, or to indicate the spiritual realization of the truth by a Buddha, realized through body, speech and mind. After that, one either bows with the elbows and head onto the ground, or by fully outstretching one's entire body. Apart from such threefold prostrations, prostrations may also be done continuously as a form of repentance, or as part of the ritual of circumambulating (walking around) a stūpa or other holy place. Finally, sometimes a pilgrimage is completely or partly done by prostrating oneself forward.

At a more basic level, respect may be shown by a gesture of clasped hands held against the chest (añjali) and raising the hands to one's head or chin, depending on the position and level of respect at which the other person is.

=== Offering ===
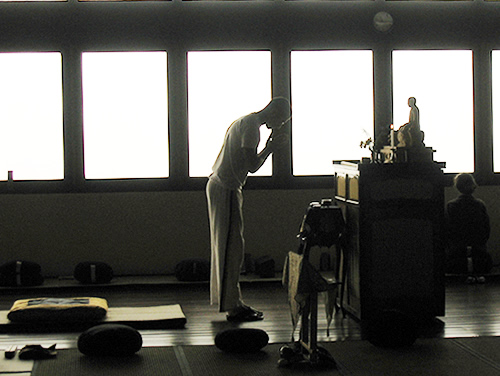
Buddhist offering incense to an image

Another important practice is the giving of offerings (pūjā) out of respect and humility to a Buddha image or other artifact. This is often combined with chanting. Buddhists may offer flowers as a symbol of growth, or incense to remind themselves of the "odor of sanctity" of the Buddha. Candles and lights may also be offered, symbolizing the dispelling of the darkness of ignorance. In Mahāyāna Buddhism, a set of seven offerings is often given, in which the first two offerings represent hospitality, and the other five the senses. Such an offering indicates respect through one's entire being, as represented by the five senses. When an offering is given in a temple, the devotees will normally take off their shoes, wash the object to be offered, approach the image or stūpa holding their hands in añjali and perform the actual offering, after which they prostrate.

The offering of flowers and other offerings and care that is given to a holy place are not only signs of respect, but they also are meant to change the environment of the devotee in a place where the Buddha would be at home. Sacrificial cakes made of cereals and butter are offered by Tibetan monastics.

Offerings given to the monastic community are also considered a form of devotion, and offerings of food are often given to the Buddha image first, after which offerings are given to the monks for their breakfast or mid-day meal.

=== Recitation ===
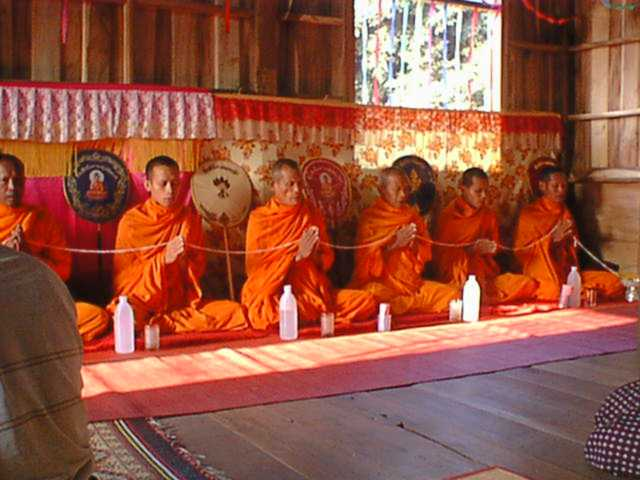
Recitation of traditional texts is encouraged in many Buddhist traditions.

Recitation of traditional texts is encouraged in many Buddhist traditions. A very basic form that is very important is the recitation of Three Refuges, of which every phrase is repeated three times. This is called taking refuge, and it is done by a naming the Buddha, the Dharma and the Saṃgha as refuges. The anussatis or recollections can also be chanted, as well as a review of the five precepts. Protective chantings (Pali: paritta) are also widespread. Many forms of protective chanting exist in Buddhism, among which the well-known Karaṇīyamettā Sutta. Whereas some of these chants are used to ward of specific dangers, such as that during childbirth, or meant for specific occasions, such as weddings, others are considered to be beneficial in a more general sense. They are believed to affect only the life of the practitioner who recites them with a mind of faith. They are considered to bring benefits to mental health and well-being, and are a form of practicing loving-kindness in thought. Moreover, they are considered to speed up the fruits of good karma, please the devas (deities) and are expressions of the truth of the Buddha's teachings.

In Mahāyāna Buddhism mantras and dhāraṇīs are also used, which include the Heart Sutra and the mantra Om Maṇi Padme Hum. Dharanis are often summaries of teachings that function like mnemonic aids. Besides these, there are also chantings in homage to Amitābha in Pure Land Buddhism, chantings in homage to the Lotus Sutra in Nichiren Buddhism and chantings in homage of the Bodhisattva Avalokiteśvara in East Asian and Tibetan Mahāyāna Buddhism. In Nichiren Buddhism, the Lotus Sūtra is honored through a seven-syllable mantra, the title of the sūtra, which is engraved on a plaque called the gohonzon. This plaque is the central focus of Nichiren devotion, and chanting the mantra in honor of the sūtra is considered of great benefit to the practitioner. In Tibetan and other forms of Mahāyāna Buddhism, the name of Avalokiteśvara is called upon through the Om Maṇi Padme Hum mantra, which is done by using praying wheels, by printing the mantra on prayer flags and carving it on stones and other materials. But this mantra is not the only form of chanting which is preserved in ritual ways: other mantras and Buddhist verses are also kept in the form of tiny scrolls kept in ornaments, amulets and even tattoos.

Chanting of Buddhist texts is the most widespread mental cultivation practice for lay people. It is believed to help overcome hindrances and negative emotions in the mind and cultivate positive ones. Buddhist chants are reflections on the good spiritual qualities of the Three Refuges or an enlightened teacher, and aspirations of spiritual perfection. Furthermore, chanting texts is considered a way to manifest the healing power of the Buddhist teaching in the world, and to benefit and protect the nation and the world. In early Buddhism, recitation of texts was done mainly for its mnemonic purpose, in a time period when religious texts were not written down. Later on, even though writing became widespread, recitation was still continued out of devotion and to commit the teachings to memory out of respect. Some elements of chanting in Buddhism, such as the monotonous style, still indicate its original mnemonic nature.

Although much chanting is done in ancient ritual languages such as Sanskrit or Pali, chants in vernacular languages also exist. A common Pali chant starts with Namo tassa..., and is often chanted to introduce a ceremony. In many Buddhist traditions, prayer beads are used during the chanting. Apart from being a tool to count the number of recitations chanted, in some traditions, the beads are a symbol of the Buddhist faith. Moreover, in Pure Land Buddhism, the beads are a reminder of the Buddha Amitābha's greatness and one's own limited capacities compared to him.

Apart from chanting, in some traditions, offerings of music are given in honor of the Triple Gem, consisting of traditional music performed by specialists, or just the ritual music that accompanies the chanting. Recitation of texts need not always be in the form of ritual chanting: in Tibet, it is considered meritorious to invite monks to read from Buddhist texts, sometimes for days on end. Devotion can also be expressed in lofty forms of everyday speech, as in the verbs used when talking about a Buddha image in some Southeast Asian languages.

=== Meditation ===
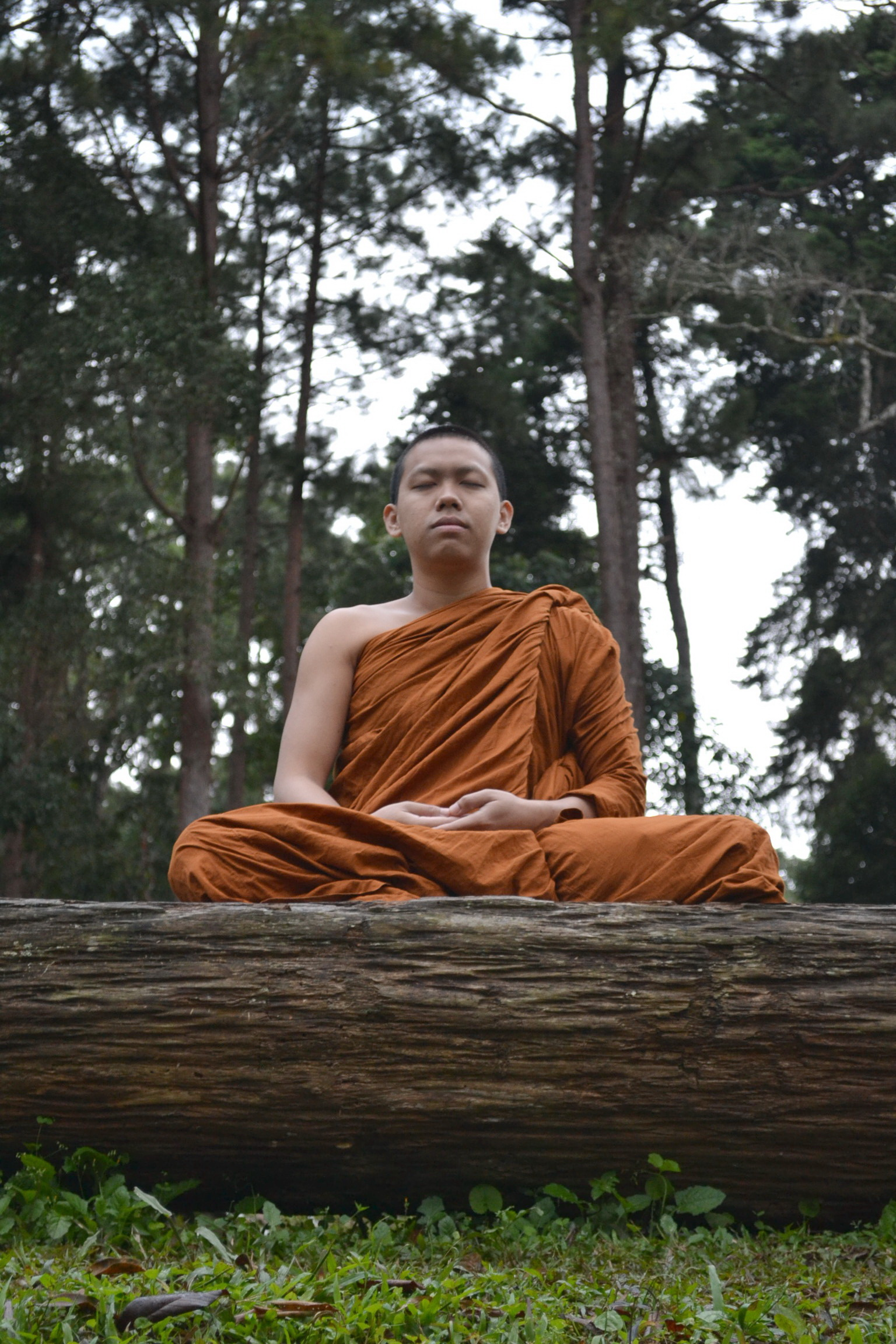
In many Buddhist traditions, faith is attributed an important role in the preparation process for meditation practice.

In many Buddhist traditions, faith is attributed an important role in the preparation process for meditation practice. Faith is often mentioned hand-in-hand with moral discipline, which practitioners require to improve their mindfulness and energy. This mindfulness and energy will then help practitioners move forward in meditation practice, culminating in wisdom and understanding.

More specifically, in the Theravāda meditation manual called the Visuddhimagga, several personality types are distinguished, among them the faith type. Each personality type requires its own approach in meditation practice. People of the faith type have some similarities with the greedy personality type, but differ in that they cling to what is beneficial and wholesome. For this type, several anussati are recommended, which means 'recollection of'. Examples are the recollection of the qualities of the Triple Gem, recollection of the benefits of moral discipline or giving, or reflection on the good qualities of devas. In texts such as the Visuddhimagga, devotion to the Triple Gem was developed into several forms of meditation: buddhānussati, dhammānusati and saṅghānusati, respectively. In these recollections, practitioners reflect on the attributes of the Triple Gem following the stock formulas found in many places in the Tipiṭaka, the early Pali scriptures. The recollection is believed to lead the practitioner to joy, inner peace and concentration. Sometimes practitioners internalize a Buddha image as a mental image used in meditation.

In Mahāyāna Buddhism, especially in Pure Land Buddhism, faith-based meditations can also be found: five recollections are used to remind oneself of the goodness of Amitābha Buddha. The first three represent body, speech and mind: practitioners honor Amitābha Buddha through physical action, e.g. by prostrating; through speech, by chanting in praise of him; and by resolving to be reborn with him in the Pure Land. The fourth recollection is a series of visualizations, similar to the faith-based meditations from the Visuddhimagga and descriptions in the Pāli Canon. In these visualizations, practitioners imagine Amitābha Buddha, the Pure Land, and after that, themselves being reborn there. The fifth "recollection" is the practice of skillful means to help others to achieve rebirth in the Pure Land as well. Apart from these visualizations, the chant in honor of Amitābha Buddha can also be recited in a meditative way, silently in one's mind or through the rhythm of one's breath. Pure Land meditations were also practiced in Tibetan Buddhism. Although there was less focus on Amitābha Buddha, some Nyingma masters did teach Amitābha visualizations. Furthermore, in Kagyu tradition a technique was taught which was believed to help cross over to a Pure Land at the time of death, called 'pho ba.

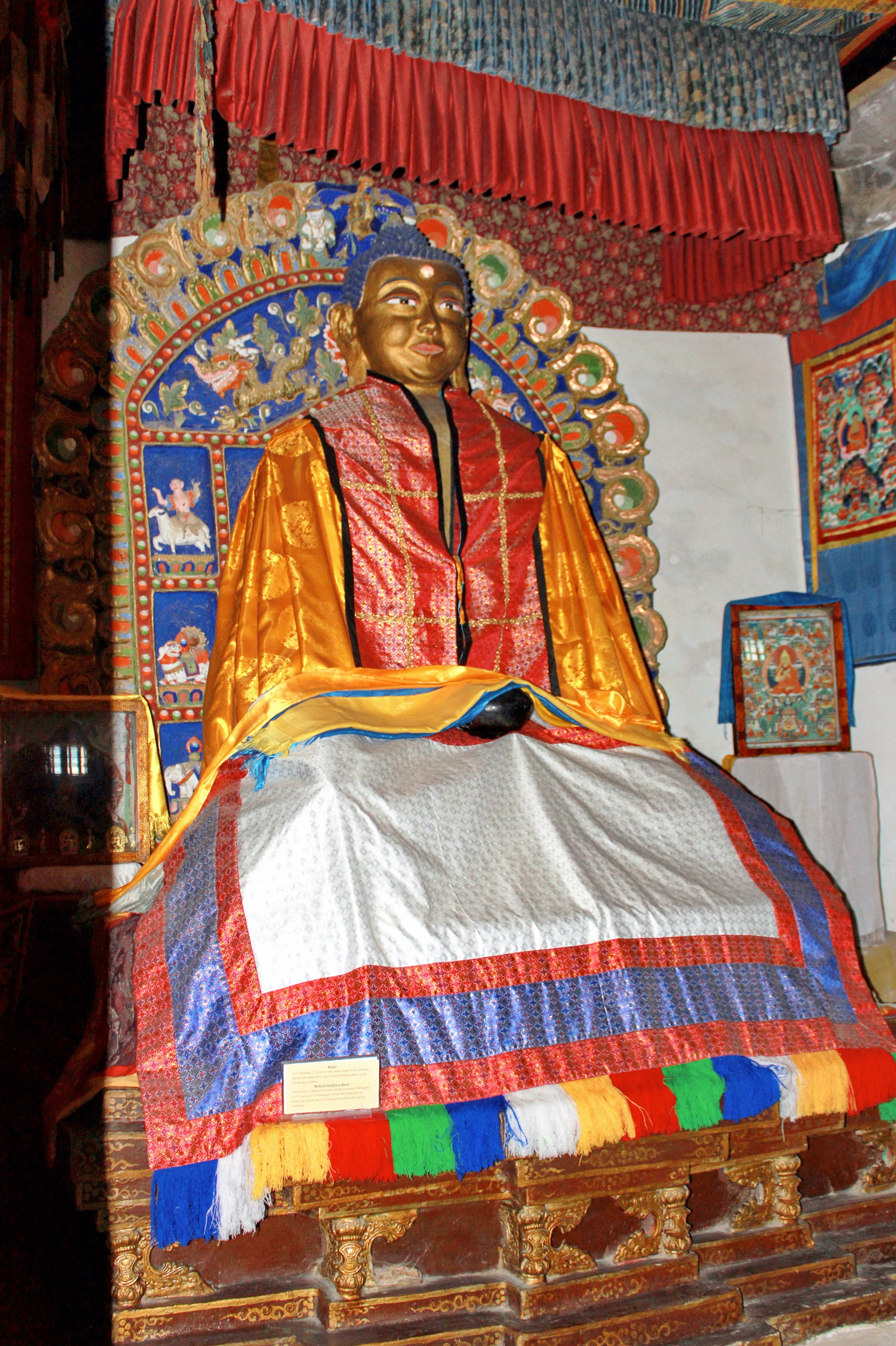
The Buddha Amitābha

There are also devotional visualization meditations in Tantric Buddhism, as can be found in Tibetan, Chinese, Korean and Japanese Buddhism. These practices differ from the Pure Land visualizations in that, apart from a Buddha, the teacher (guru) is very important in the process, and a form of meditation directed towards the guru is also taught. Practitioners often take refuge in their spiritual teacher, who symbolizes the Triple Gem. Furthermore, they often take refuge in a yidam (Tibetan), which Buddhist Studies scholar Peter Harvey translates as 'tutelary deity'. This can be a Buddha, a bodhisattva or a deity. By focusing on the exemplary aspects of one's teacher, who is also visualized in meditation, one develops faith in the practice. Furthermore, the practitioner needs to go through an initiation ritual, in which the guru transmits the knowledge on a particular yidam, and a mantra, visualization practice and sometimes ritual gestures that are appropriate for that deity. Unlike Pure Land visualizations, there are many deities to choose from. The mantra is regarded to express the nature of the yidam, and the gestures are considered to evoke the appropriate states of mind. Moreover, visualization techniques and mantra syllables are believed to actually evoke the deity recalled and incorporate the deity in one's being. Using these practices, the devotee is believed to be guided by the yidam to transform his faults, for example anger, to a "parallel kind of wisdom" (Harvey). When incorporating the yidam into one's being, the devotee is actively imitating the activities associated with that yidam, and this is believed to speed up the attainment of Buddhahood. There are several other tantric devotional meditation forms, including visualizing one's lineage of teachers and prostrating for them, and imagining one's teacher as a Buddha.

In Shingon Buddhism, a visualization meditation is often practiced called Ajikan. In this practice, done by both monastics and lay people, devotees invite the Mahāvairocana Buddha to attend the meditation, and visualize a letter A, as a mystical symbol of voidness and the origin of all existence.

Devotion can also be expressed through walking meditation, which is very clearly seen in the Pure Land tradition. Pure Land devotees may practice walking meditation continuously for ninety days on end. Devotees walk around an image of Amitābha Buddha, visualizing him and chanting his name: breaks are only taken for bodily functions. The practice was first proposed by the Chinese writer Shandao.

=== Pilgrimage ===
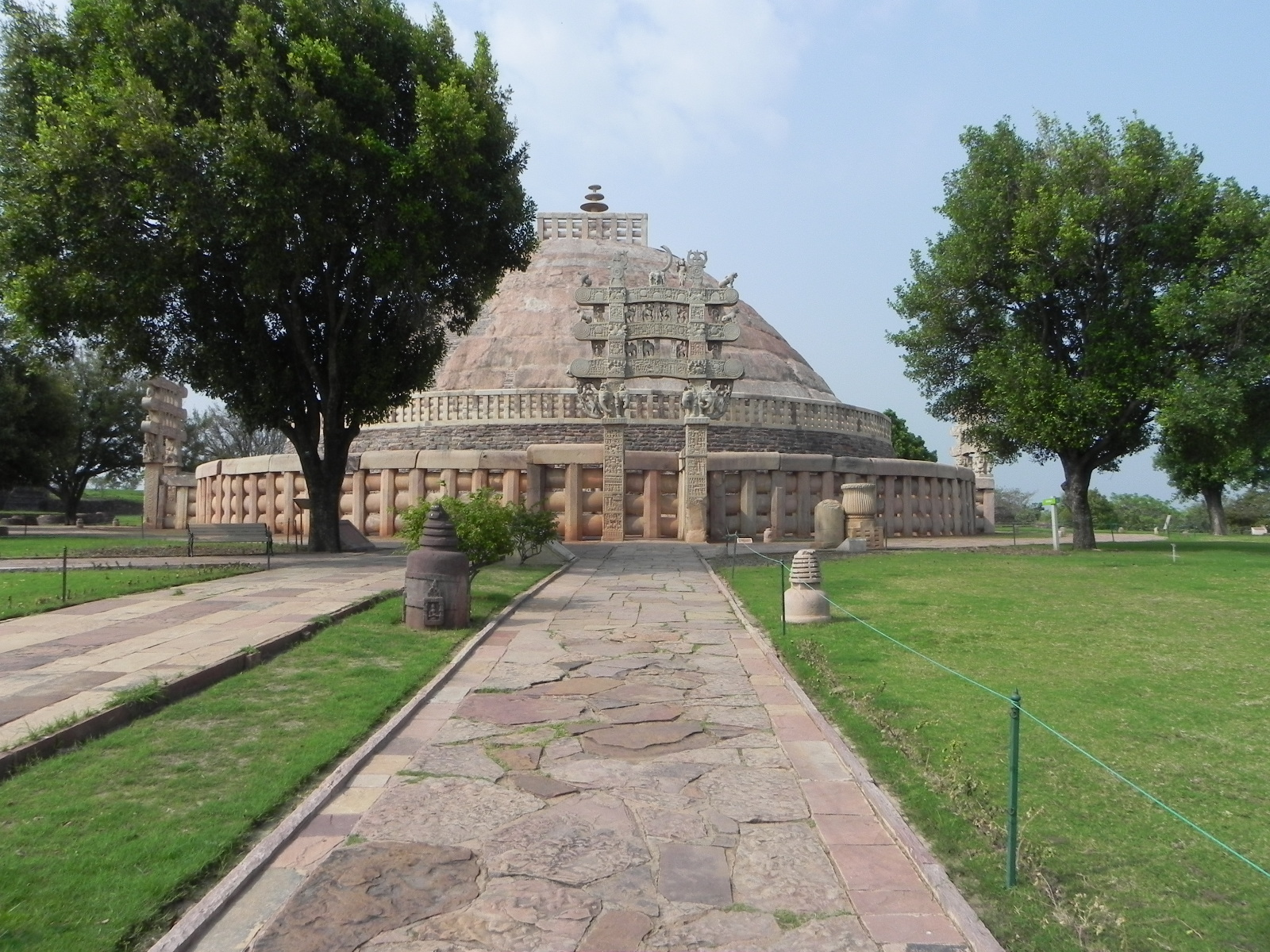
The Sanchi stūpa, a traditional pilgrimage place in India

Pilgrimage has been described by scholars as the summit of all devotional practices in Buddhism. According to early texts, (Note: Digha Nikaya, volume II, pages 140f (PTS pagination)) it is advocated by the Buddha himself. He suggests to pay respect to four places, that is, the place where he is born (Lumbini), the place where he has first attained enlightenment (Bodh Gaya), the place where he preached his first teaching (Sarnath), and finally, the place where he attained his Final Nibbāna (Kusinara). Indeed, to dispel any doubt about the usefulness of such pilgrimage, the Buddha states that he accepts in advance all gifts presented to memorial places such as cetiyas or stūpas, and places of pilgrimage. Such offerings and pilgrimage are therefore considered just as fruitful after he has died, as when he was still alive. Pilgrimage to these four sites in India, especially to Bodh Gaya, has been popular in ancient times, and is now popular again, though on a much larger scale than before. Among the four sites, Bodh Gaya is considered by many to be the most important. The Buddha is believed to have realized the truth there that lies at the foundation of Buddhism.

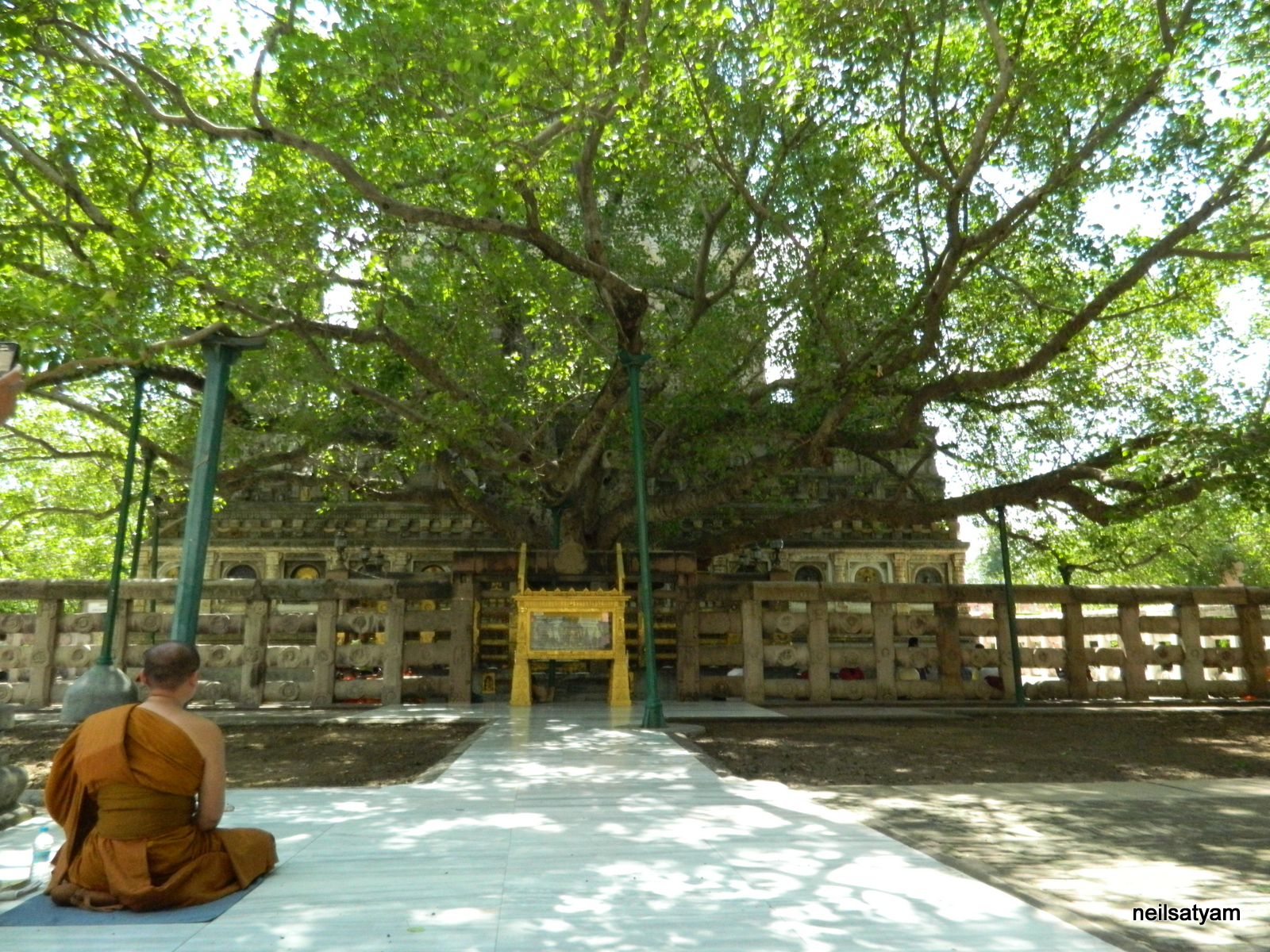
According to early Buddhist scriptures, the Buddha himself recommends to go for pilgrimage to the place where he attained enlightenment, that is Bodh Gaya.

Other places were later added, particularly in other countries, where pilgrimage to the original sites would be daunting. In traditional Buddhist countries such as Sri Lanka, Myanmar and Thailand, Bodhi trees, ancient relics and other holy places (like the cetiya) are also visited as part of pilgrimages. In 11th-century Japan, an institutional system was developed called Shugendō, in which various parts of Japan's geography came to be regarded as symbols of the Buddhist teaching, or to stand for certain bodhisattvas or important historical figures in Japanese Buddhism. Numerous pilgrimage routes were developed to honor these sites, as narratives about them were written down and monasteries and shrines were established on them. In Tibetan Buddhism, many pilgrimage guides have been written with practical instructions for the pilgrim, but also to describe the mystical vision which accompanies the pilgrimage. Buddhists might go on pilgrimage for several reasons: to gain merit, to remind themselves of the Buddha's life, to suffuse themselves with the spiritual power of the pilgrimage places and its artifacts, as a promise made to a bodhisatta in exchange for favors, to gain protection from devas that protect the pilgrimage places, or to bring harmony to their family. Furthermore, pilgrims might want to dedicate the good karma of the trip to their ill or deceased relatives. But often the pilgrimage is simply done to enjoy the nature or cultural settings, to escape city life, or out of nostalgia for the past. Just like pilgrimages in any other religion, the pilgrimage gives devotees the chance to remove themselves from their everyday social-economic position in society, and to become part of another kind of community, characterized by a new ambiguous status.

In some Buddhist countries, pilgrimages must be done on foot. Sometimes, pilgrims also perform ascetic or devotional practices such as having a cold bath as part of the visits, or prostrating along the path. Pilgrimages are sometimes done in certain periods, such as in Sri Lanka on days of observance or in certain seasons, and in Tibetan Buddhism as scheduled by a twelve-year cycle. Furthermore, in modern times, Buddhist pilgrimage has often been done as a political statement against certain regimes.

Examples of well-known pilgrimage sites are the Temple of the Tooth in Sri Lanka, the Shwe Dagon temple in Myanmar, Mount Wutai and Mount Tai in China, the Kumano Shrine in Japan, and the Bodnath Stūpa in Nepal.

=== Self-immolation ===
One practice that has been more controversial than most devotional practices in Buddhism, is the practice of self-immolation. In Buddhist teaching, the human body is regarded as without intrinsic value, but becomes valuable depending on how it is used. The practice of self-immolation is based on this idea, according to which "abandoning the body" in doing good deeds is regarded as a form of heroism. Although the practice seems to go against the Buddhist concept of the Middle Way, Buddhist teaching does emphasize dealing with the natural urges of the body.

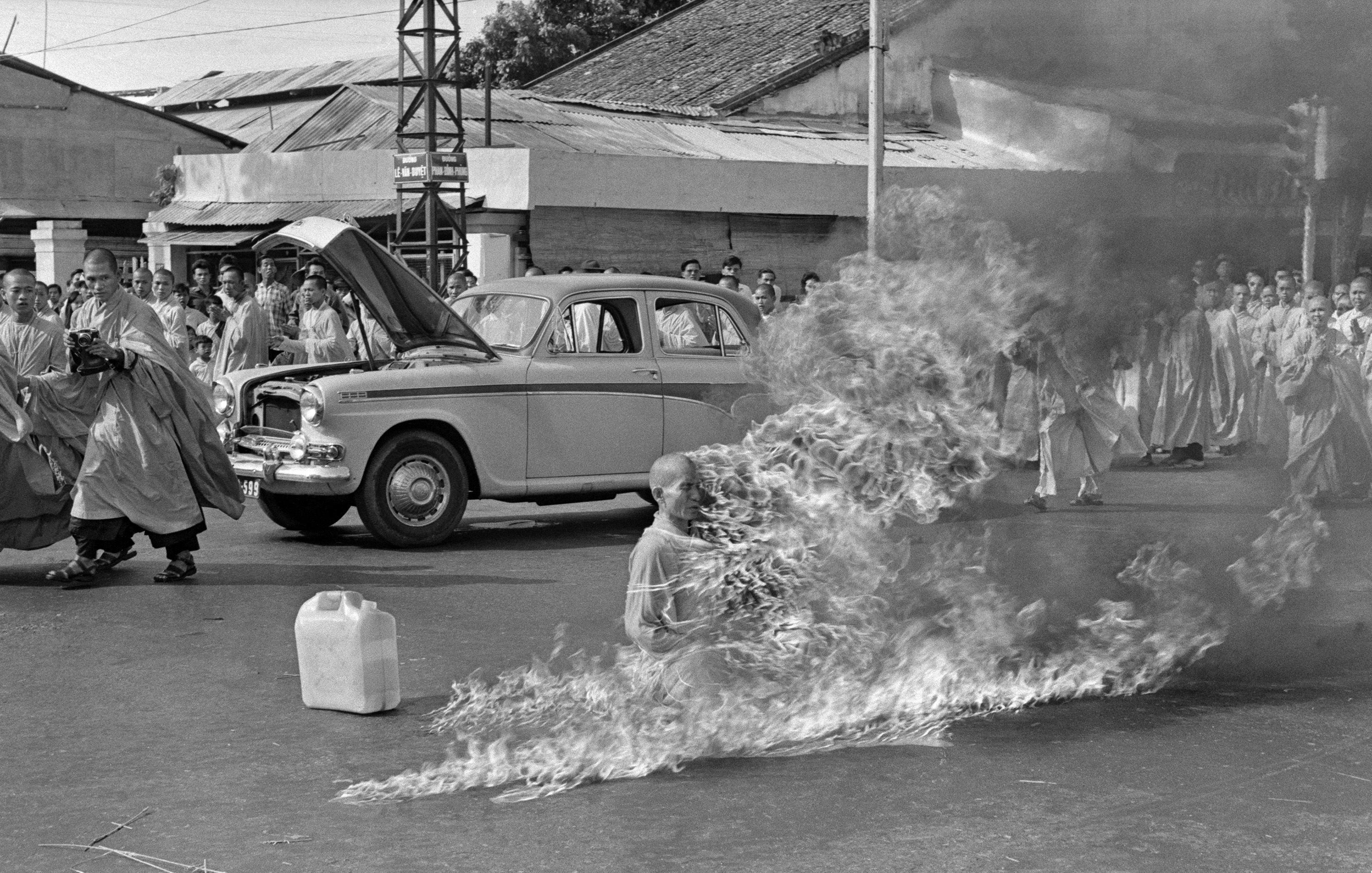
Self-immolation of Thích Quảng Đức during the Buddhist crisis in Vietnam

The practice became more common in China during the fourth until the tenth century CE, with Japan following suit, in the Kamakura Period. The practice was first described in the twenty-third chapter of the Lotus Sūtra, in which the bodhisattva Bhaiṣajyarāja set his own body on fire as a supreme offering to a Buddha. Apart from these Indian origins, the practice may have been preceded by indigenous practices to conjure up rain. Regarded by some as a highly developed form of doing good (pāramitā), devotees burnt parts of their body, such as an arm or a finger, in honor of the sūtra, or hoping to be reborn in a Pure Land. Burning oneself fully as an act of devotion, also known as auto-cremation, was a highly respected practice in China at the time, and was often organized as a public event, attended by emperors and officials.

During the Vietnam War, Buddhist monks used self-immolation as a way to express political dissent. When the monk Thich Quang Duc performed self-immolation in 1963, this was widely featured in international press reports. This contributed to the US government eventually withdrawing from supporting President Diem, who suppressed Buddhism.

Self-immolation became more and more subject of criticism from the eight century CE onward, from Confucianists, state officials and also from Buddhist monks themselves. In the 21st century CE, the practice has become uncommon. Nevertheless, up until the 1990s and 2000s, Vietnamese monks were still reported to practice self-immolation, and Chinese and Korean monks still offered their fingers, burning them.

=== Circumambulation ===
Another form of devotional respect is to circumambulate three times around a Buddha image or holy place, keeping it to the right. Traditionally, it is recommended to do this clockwise, with the right shoulder facing the image or place, and if possible, bared. The holy place which is circumambulated can be a temple, a monastery, a mountain or a city. This custom is also symbolic for the sun moving around the central, cosmic mountain, and is practiced in groups at yearly festivals, as well as at funerals. It is usually performed on foot, but sometimes in a vehicle.

== Places ==
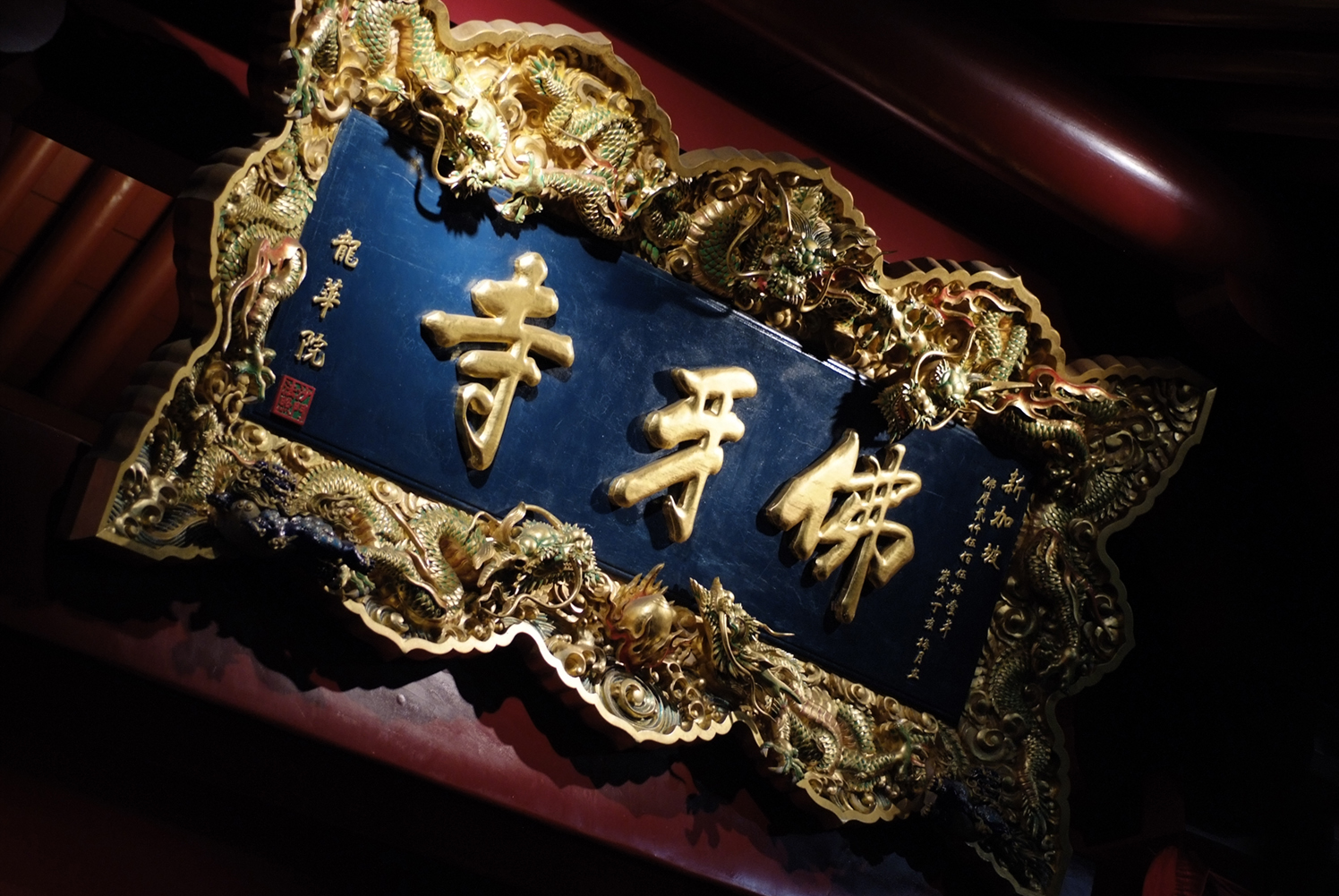
Sign adorning the grand entrance of the Buddha Tooth Relic Temple in Singapore

Although almost all devotional practices can be done in one's own home, it is custom to meet in the local temple on festivals and days of observance. Buddhist temples often contain dormitories for monastics, who meditate and study there, and lead devotional practices at the temple. Theravāda, Chan and Zen Buddhist temples usually only have an image of Gautama Buddha in the main room, perhaps combined with images of his close disciples Śāriputra and Maudgalyāyana. In Mahāyāna Buddhist temples, more diversity can be found, including different heavenly Buddhas, Bodhisattvas and sometimes a series of arahant disciples (disciples that have achieved personal enlightenment). The Buddhist temple usually contains a room for meetings, meditations or preaching, and may contain a stūpa with relics or Buddhist texts, or a Bodhi tree. This type of room in a temple is called the buddhavasa, or the 'Buddha's dwelling place', whereas the dormitories for monastics are called sanghavasa, or the 'Sangha's dwelling place'. In Chinese, Japanese and Korean temples, the room with stūpas and relics is often a separate hall from the teaching hall, and there is usually a separate hall with Buddha images as well. In modern Mahāyāna temples in the West, however, the temple's structure is often simplified. Last of all, in Vajrayāna temples, iconic devotional paintings called thankas can be found, as well as mandalas, which picture Vajrayāna cosmology.

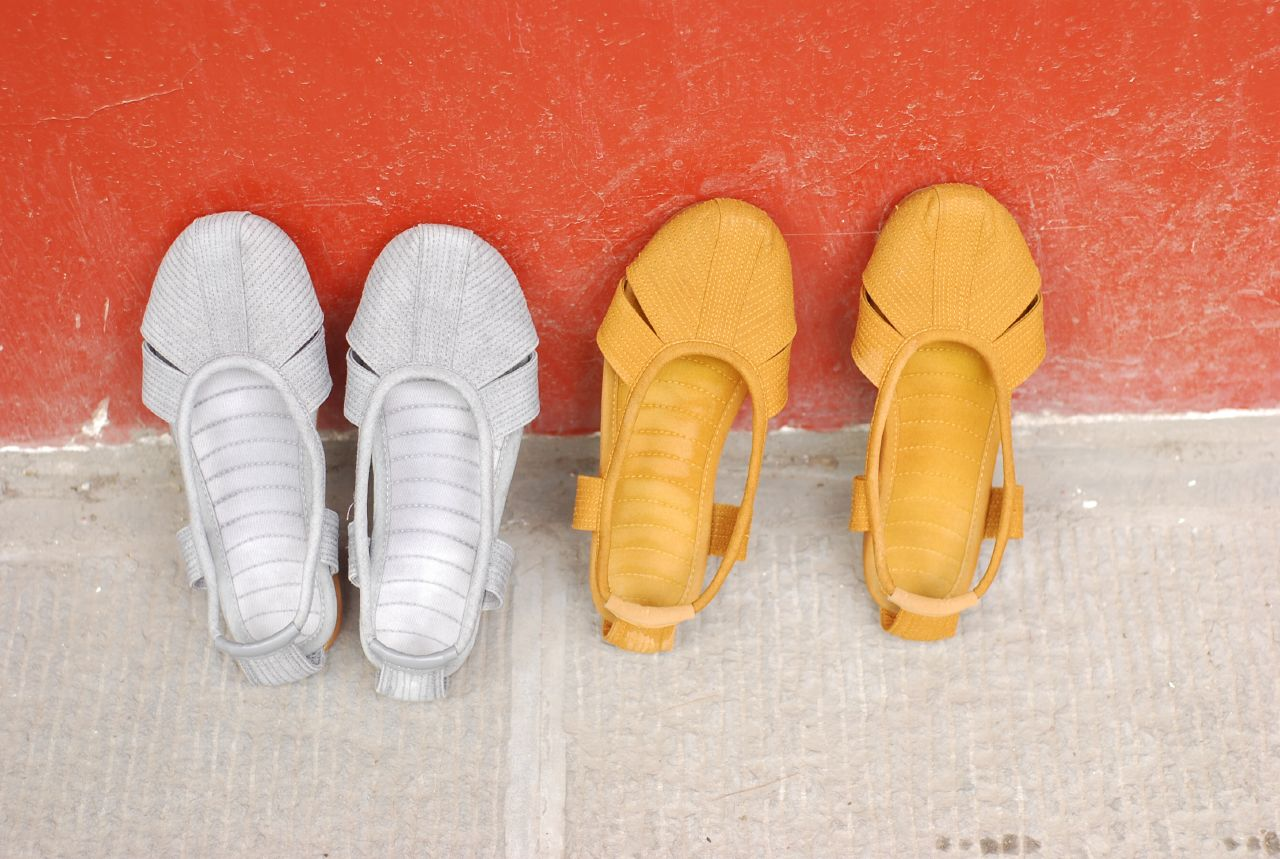
It is common in Buddhist temples to take off one's shoes or change them.

Stūpas and Buddha images may be donated by a single supporter, or by a community of devotees, motivated by merit-making motives. In most Buddhist traditions, Buddha images are regarded as more than just representations, but as actually imbued with a spiritual power connected to the Three Refuges and the faith of the devotee, as reflected in consecration ceremonies and legendary accounts. Similarly, relics are also widely honored, because they are seen as an embodiment of the Buddha. Believed by some scholars to be a Buddhist invention, devotion to relics brings Buddhism from a distant age and place closer to home. Also, some Buddhists believe the relics have supernatural abilities, such as the ability to reproduce themselves. Temples with well-known relics such as the Temple of the Tooth in Sri Lanka are worshipped by thousands of people per day, and well-known relics often provide both the religion as the region with a cultural identity. The stūpas that contain the relics are not just honored for the relics, however; by some Buddhists they are also seen as symbolizing the state of enlightenment.

Buddhist temples may be built in a place deemed sacred following the principles of the country's sacred geography, geomancy or because of a pilgrimage route.

It is common in Buddhist temples to take off one's shoes or change them. In ancient times, shoes were a status symbol and taking them off was, therefore, an expression of humility. It might also have been done to keep the temple grounds clean. Another custom is to put the Buddha image on the highest spot in the room, and devotees will prevent raising their head higher than the image or point their feet at the image.

== Festivals and observance days ==
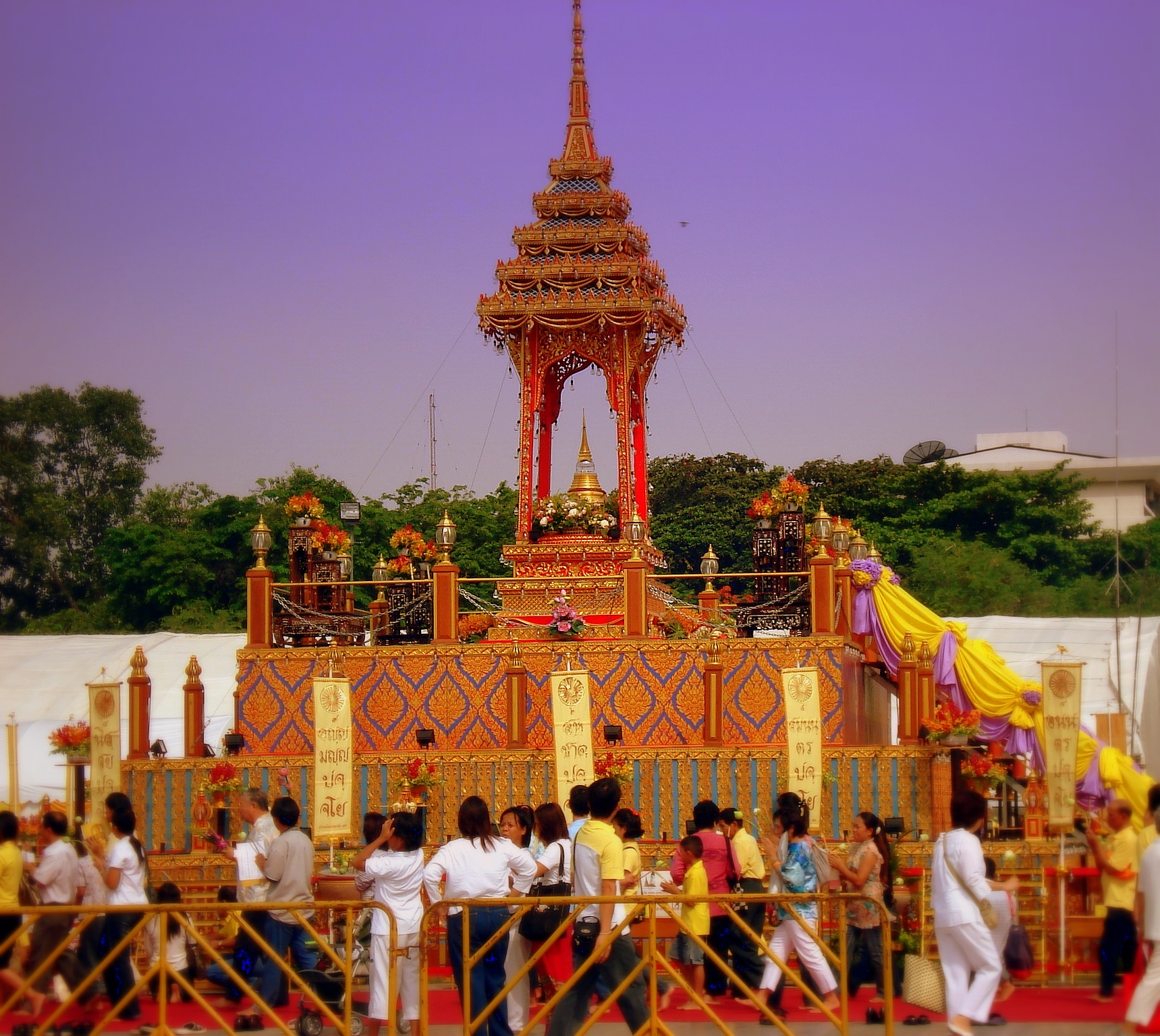
Vesak ceremony held in Sanam Luang, Bangkok, Thailand

All Buddhist traditions have festivals, during which devotion is practiced. Many of these are Buddhist in origin, others are a response to pre-Buddhist cultural traditions, the agricultural year cycle, certain national deities, or important events in the local history. In many Theravāda countries, the traditional New Year is celebrated mid-year, during which certain Buddhist customs are observed. This includes ceremonies for reflection on misdeeds and resolving to do good, and release of animals. Other important festivals are Vesak, Asalha Puja, the Pavāraṇa Day and Kaṭhina. Vesak is the day that celebrates the birth, enlightenment and final enlightenment (after death) of the Buddha Gautama. In some countries, however, these three events are celebrated as separate days.

In East Asian countries, many of these festivals are also celebrated, but other festivals with pre-Buddhist origins are held as well, combined with Buddhist elements. An example of this is the Ghost Festival, on which is recollected that Maudgalyāyana Sthavira dedicated good karma to his deceased mother, out of gratitude to her. This festival was a response to Confucian ideals of filial piety. Some Buddhist festivals honor a certain Dharma text. For example, the Thai festival of Thet Mahachat is dedicated to the recitation of the Vessantara Jātaka, a story about kingship and merit-making.

Apart from festivals, in Theravāda Buddhism, there are also observance days (Pali: uposatha) following the ancient Indian lunar calendar. Uposatha days are observed by the more strict devotees, who will go to their local temple to give food, take upon themselves the five or eight precepts, listen to teachings and meditate. In other traditions, there are also monthly or bimonthly, weekly or daily observances. Moreover, the monastic rains retreat (vassa) is for many devotees a time to focus more on chanting and meditation.

== See also ==
- Buddhist music
- Ratana Sutta
- Awgatha - Burmese Buddhist Devotion
- Sacca-kiriya
- Buddhist liturgy
- Yujia Yankou
- Shuilu Fahui
- Buddhist paths to liberation
- Sādhu
- Funeral/Bardo
- Death anniversary
- Bon (festival)
- Higan
- Transfer of merit
- Offering (Buddhism)
- Segaki
- Silken Painting of Emperor Go-Daigo
