= Sadu (disambiguation) =

Sadu may refer to:

- Sadu, commune in Romania
- Sadu (Jiu), a river in Romania, tributary of the Jiu
- Sadu (Cibin), a river in Romania, tributary of the Cibin
- Kalateh-ye Sadu village in Iran
- Sadu language from China
- Sadashiv Shinde, known as "Sadu", an Indian cricketer
- Al Sadu, or Sadu, an embroidery form in geometrical shapes hand-woven by Bedouin people
- Sadu House in Kuwait, a museum of bedouin Sadu weaving, established by the Al Sadu society
- Sadu-Hem, one of the Ogdru Hem fictional creatures in the Hellboy universe
- Sadu Zai descendants of the Abakhel tribe of Pashtuns
- Ramkali Sadu, a Sikh composition

== See also ==
- Sadus, an American thrash metal band
- Sadhu, a holy person in hinduism
- Sathu, an exclamation in Pali language
