= Transfer of merit =

Buddhist devotional practice

Translations of Transfer of merit
- Sanskrit: pariṇāmanā
- Pali: pattidāna
- Burmese: ပတ္တိဒါန
- Chinese: 迴向 (Pinyin: huíxiàng)
- Japanese: 回向 or 廻向 (Rōmaji: Ekō)
- Tibetan: བསྔོ་བ་ (bsngo ba)
- Thai: อุทิศบุญกุศล
- Vietnamese: hồi hướng

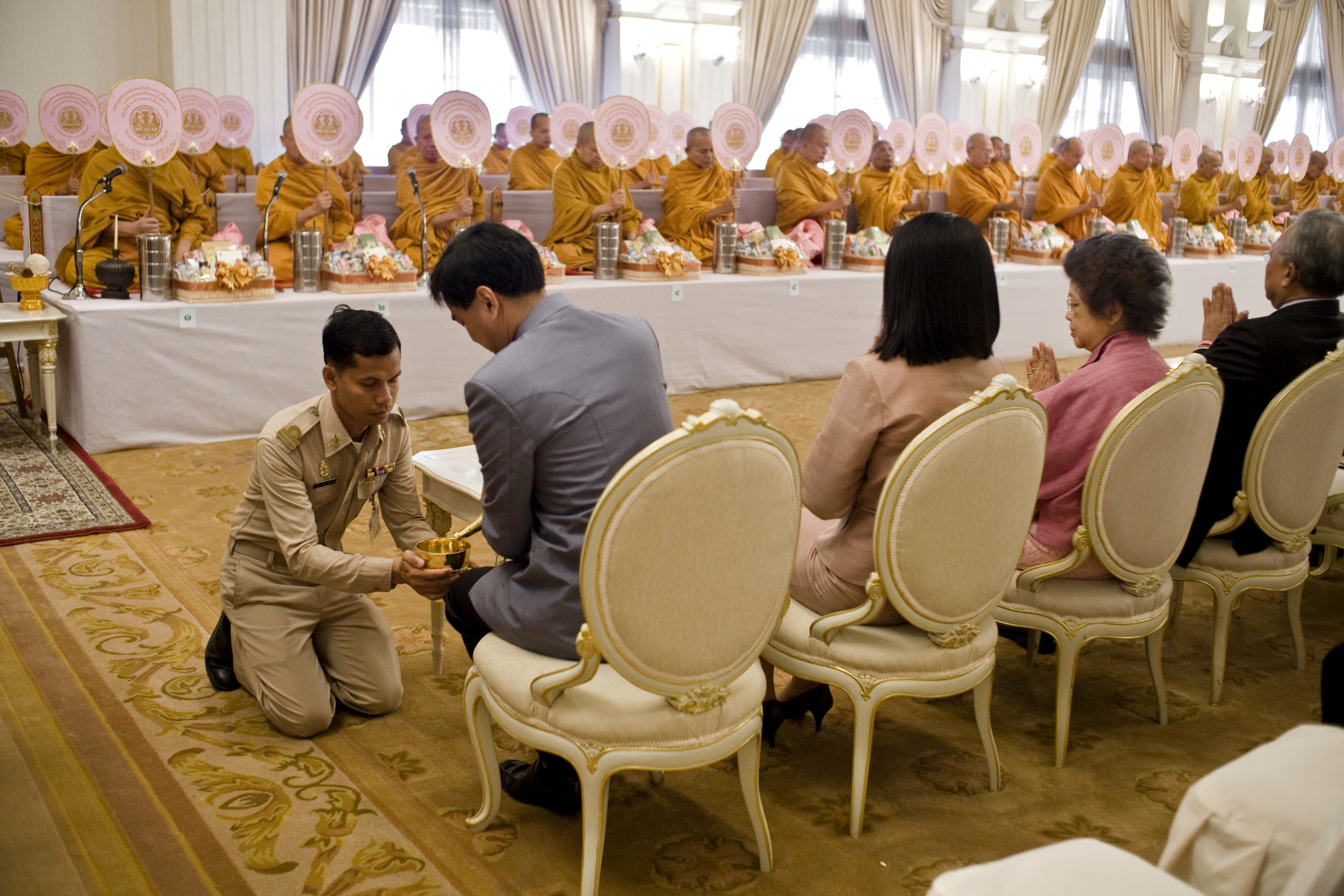
Sometimes transferring merit is symbolized by pouring water into a vessel.

Transfer of merit (Sanskrit: pariṇāmanā, (Note: Alternatively spelled as pariṇāma or paraṇāmanā) Pali: pattidāna or pattānumodanā) (Note: In the early Pāli texts, patti refers to transference of merit to another living being, whereas pattānumodanā refers to transference to the dead.) is a standard part of Buddhist spiritual discipline where the practitioner's merit, resulting from good deeds, is transferred to deceased relatives, to deities, or to all sentient beings.

Such transfer is done mentally, and it is believed that the recipient can often receive this merit, if they rejoice in the meritorious acts of the person transferring. In Buddhism, merit transfer is seen as a better alternative than mourning.

Scholars have discussed how the doctrine of transfer of merit can be reconciled with the individual nature of karma in Buddhism. Some scholars believe that the idea originates with early Buddhism, whereas others suspect a later origin.

In Buddhism, such worship was given an ethical emphasis. The doctrine may also have been influenced by pre-Buddhist ideas of transference of powers. In Mahāyāna Buddhism, transfer of merit became an essential aspect of the ideal of the bodhisattva, the Buddha-to-be, who uses his merits to help all living beings.

Transfer of merit is widely practiced in all Buddhist countries, in ceremonies, festivals, and daily practice. In the present day, transfer of merit has become an intrinsic part of Buddhism and has an important social function.

== Translations ==
In the later Pāli tradition (from 5th–7th century CE), the word pattidāna is used, meaning 'giving of the acquired'. In the Sanskrit tradition, the word pariṇāmanā is used for transferring merit, meaning 'change, alternation; ripening, bringing to maturity; development; diversion'. The term 'transfer of merit' has become commonplace, though objected to by many scholars. Indeed, 'transfer of merit' does not render any term from a classical Buddhist language.

== Description ==
Merit (Sanskrit: puṇya, Pali: puñña) is a concept considered fundamental to Buddhist ethics. It is a beneficial and protective force which accumulates as a result of good deeds, acts, or thoughts. Merit-making is important to Buddhist practice: merit brings good and agreeable results, determines the quality of the next life, and contributes to a person's growth towards enlightenment. Alongside the concept of merit, in Mahāyāna, pariṇāmanā is also associated with the concept of 'roots of virtue' (Sanskrit: kuśala-mūla).

Transferring merit is a widespread custom in all Buddhist countries, Mahāyāna, Vajrayāna and Theravāda, and is often practiced at ceremonies and festivals in honor of the dead.

Transferring merit to another person, usually deceased relatives, is simply done by a mental wish. Despite the word transfer, the merit of the giver is in no way decreased during such an act. The traditional metaphor is a candle used to light another candle, of which the light does not diminish in the process.

The merit transferred cannot always be received, however. According to early Buddhist texts, if dead relatives are reborn in a place that is too high or too low, as a deva (deity), as a human, as an animal or in hell, they cannot receive the merit. They can only receive the merit if they are born as pretas, that is, spirits or ghosts. They must also be able to sympathize with the meritorious act. The transfer of merit is thus connected with the idea of rejoicing. If the relatives do not receive the merit, however, the very act of transferring merit will still be meritorious for the giver himself.

This explains part of the definition of pariṇāmanā ('bringing to maturity'): when a giver gives merit, he also gains it in that way. The other person who rejoices in one's meritorious deeds, in that way also receives merit, if he approves of the merit done. Thus, rejoicing in others' merits, apart from being one of ten meritorious acts mentioned in Buddhist texts, (Note: Ten meritorious deeds mentioned in non-canonical Buddhist texts and widely known in the Buddhist world. They consist of: giving (Pali: dāna-maya); virtue (Pali: sīla-maya); bhāvanā (mental development) (Pali: bhāvanā-maya); honoring others (Pali: apacāyana-maya); offering service (Pali: veyyāvaca-maya); dedicating (or transferring) merit to others (Pali: pattidāna-maya); rejoicing in others' merit (Pali: pattānumodanā-maya); listening to teachings (Pali: dhammassavana-maya); instructing others in the teachings (Pali: dhammadesanā-maya); straightening one's own views in accordance with the teachings (Pali: diṭṭhujukamma)) is also a prerequisite for the transferring of merit to occur.

Because it is believed that merit can actually be transferred, transferring merit to deceased loved ones is seen as a better alternative than mourning. Also, since in the next life there is no such thing as making a living through some occupation, merit is what sustains living beings in the afterlife. Material things cannot be transferred directly to beings in the next world, but the merit accrued by making a donation to the monastic community (Saṅgha) can be transferred. In this way, a certain object donated appears in the next world for the recipient there, although this is through the strength of the intention of giving, not through the physical act of offering by itself.

The traditional example of the transferring of merit in the commentaries to the Pāli Tipiṭaka is that of King Bimbisāra, who the Buddha encourages to share his merits with his former relatives, reborn as pretas. In the story, during a visit of the Buddha to Bimbisāra's palace, Bimbisāra asks about some outside noise. The Buddha explains it is the noise of pretas, who in a previous life were the king's relatives.

The noise was the pretas crying out of hunger. The Buddha continues that the only way the king could help his former relatives was to transfer the merit from the gifts he had given to the Saṅgha to the pretas. The pretas are then seen to receive the objects given to the monks: Bimbisāra gives food and cloth to the Saṅgha, and the merit of the gifts allows the pretas to receive the objects given as well.

== Purpose ==
The purposes for merit transfer differ. Some Mahāyāna traditions believe that it can help deceased relatives to attain the Pure Land, a heavenly paradise in Pure Land Buddhist cosmology. In many Buddhist countries, transferring merit is connected to the notion of an intermediate state between death and rebirth, during which the wandering being's future destiny is still uncertain. The merit that is transferred to the deceased will help them to cross over safely to the next rebirth.

Or if the spirit has already been reborn, but in an undesirable rebirth, the merits transferred will help to shorten the time that the spirit must spend there. On a similar note, when performing a ceremony to drive away a spirit that has possessed a devotee, devotees may invite a monk for a ceremony to transfer merits to the spirit. Another aim in transferring merit, apart from helping the deceased, is to dedicate it to the devas, the early orthodox view that they cannot receive merit notwithstanding.

It is believed that they are not able to do good deeds themselves, and their favor can be obtained in this way. Often, transference to deities is focused on deities that are considered protectors of Buddhism. Furthermore, merit is sometimes transferred to parents as a form of devotion or filial piety. Many Buddhists transfer merits to resolve a bond of revenge that may exist between people, as it is believed that someone else's vengefulness may create harm in one's life. Because of this reason, in Japan a special memorial service (Mizuko kuyō) is often held after an abortion, to dedicate merit to the spirit of the deceased child. Finally, it is also a common practice to transfer merits to all sentient beings, though more commonly so in Mahāyāna Buddhism than in Theravāda.

The transfer of demerit or evil, the opposite of transfer of merit, has little to no role in Buddhism. It does sometimes take place in Hinduism, in which it is linked with the idea of pollution.

== Historical analysis ==
=== Relation with karma ===
Initially in the Western study of Buddhism, some scholars believed that the transfer of merit was unique to Mahāyāna Buddhism and that it was developed only at a late period after the historical Buddha. For example, Indologist Heinz Bechert dated the Buddhist doctrine of transfer of merit in its fully developed form to the period between the fifth and seventh century CE. Scholars argued that it was discordant with the early Buddhist understandings of karma, and noticed in the Kathāvatthu text that the idea is partly refuted by Theravādins.

Theologian Tommi Lehtonen quotes historian Wolfgang Schumann stating that "the Mahāyāna teaching of the transfer of merit breaks the strict causality of the Hinayānic law of karman (P. kamma) according to which everybody wanting better rebirth can reach it solely by his own efforts". Or as Buddhologist D. Seyfort Ruegg notes,

An idea that has posed a number of thorny questions and conceptual difficulties for Buddhist thought and the history of the Mahāyāna is that often referred to as 'transfer of merit' (puṇyapariṇāmanā). ... Yet such dedication appears, prima facie, to run counter to the karmic principle of the fruition or retribution of deeds (karmavipāka). Generally accepted in Buddhism, both Mahāyānist and non-Mahāyānist, this principle stipulates that a karmic fruit or result (karmaphala) is 'reaped', i.e. experienced, solely by the person—or more precisely by the conscious series (saṃtāna)—that has sown the seed of future karmic fruition when deliberately (cetayitva) accomplishing an action (karman).

Scholars have suggested the practice of transference may have developed due to influence of Mahāyāna Buddhism, in which beings aiming to become a Buddha (bodhisattva) can share merit with devotees and thereby save them. Ruegg also argues that the related idea of receiving (Pali: patti, Sanskrit: prāpti) merit through rejoicing, expressed through terms such as pattānumodanā and pattidāna, may have developed due to Mahāyāna influence.

Other scholars have argued that the doctrine of the transfer of merit can be found early in the Theravāda tradition, and that the doctrine is sanctioned by early texts. For example, Indologist Richard Gombrich placed its origins around the fourth century BCE. Buddhist Studies scholar Gregory Schopen states that the idea of merit transfer is part of all epigraphical findings that are related to a Buddhist belief in karma, even the earliest, in the third century BCE. Then there also scholars who propose that, although the concept of transfer of merit did not exist as such in early Buddhism, early doctrines did form a basis for it, the concept of transfer of merit being an "inherent consequence" (Bechert) of these early doctrines. Gombrich theorizes that early Buddhism focused on individual karma and responsibility, and that the teaching on transference of merit provided an "escape" to this strict doctrine of individual responsibility. He further argues that the term anumodana, in later Buddhism used for rejoicing as a way to receive merit, in the earliest Pāli texts meant 'giving thanks' and was used when the deceased gave thanks for transferred merit. Later commentators reinterpreted the term to mean 'rejoicing', to fit in with Buddhist orthodoxy. They explained that the deceased gained merit through simply rejoicing in the merits that their relatives made for them. In this way, there was no real transference of merit, but the deceased made merit by themselves, following orthodox doctrine on individual karma. This still is the explanation given by monastics and other notables in countries like Burma and Sri Lanka, when asked about the apparent contradiction between individual retribution of karma and the transfer of merit.

=== Transfer of powers ===
The idea that a certain power can be transferred from one person to another was known before Buddhism. In Hindu texts such as the Mahābhārata, it is described that devas can transfer certain powers (tejas). A similar belief existed with regard to the energy gained by performing austerities (tapas). In the Upanishads, certain ceremonies can be found in which a person's deeds are mystically transferred to another. In the Dharmashastra many examples can be found of good or evil deeds of one person being transferred to another person, whether on purpose or not. However, according to Buddhist Studies scholar M. M. J. Marasinghe, the concept of the transfer of merit in early Buddhism is different from pre-Buddhist ideas in several respects: merit is not donated in literal, measurable parts; meritorious acts in relation to the Saṅgha are emphasized; devas do not take any part in it; and it is often a compassionate act towards living beings in the next world who are in suffering. Moreover, anthropologist Charles F. Keyes argues that transfer of merit in Buddhism differs from Hinduism in that no actual substance is exchanged in the rituals, but the transfer is merely abstract.

=== Ancestor worship ===
Apart from these transfers of power, a second origin is found in Pitru. The Petavatthu text was the Buddhist response to such worship. In this text, transferring merit to deceased relatives is described in detail. The word peta, literally, 'gone forth', is used in early Buddhism to refer to one's dead relatives in the context of merit transfer. It is the Pāli equivalent of Sanskrit preta (hungry ghost), but also Sanskrit pitṛ (father, ancestor). In the period preceding the arising of Buddhism, it was believed that when somebody died he had to be transformed from a wandering preta to the state of the blissful world of the pitṛs. This was done through the complex śrāddha ceremonies, which would secure the deceased's destiny as a pitṛ.

In early Buddhism, however, ancestor worship was discontinued, as it was believed that the dead would not reach heavenly bliss through rituals or worship, but only through the causality of karma. The practice of transfer of merit developed on the basis of the ethical and psychological principles of karma and merit, and by connecting these principles with the sense of responsibility towards parents in the context of ancestor worship. As for the veneration of dead ancestors, Buddhists replaced this by the veneration of the Saṅgha. In many Buddhist countries, the Saṅgha has therefore taken the role of an intermediary between the devotees who dedicate merit and their deceased relatives. In this context, the Saṅgha is considered a "field of merit": a worthy recipient that helps the devotee accrue the merits required for transfer. In his role in funeral rites, the Buddhist monk replaced the Brahmin priest as a recipient of gifts. Through the monk's role as a field of merit, lay people were able to adhere to the high standards of Buddhism and its aim on renunciation of the world.

=== Mahāyāna Buddhism ===
The doctrine of the transfer of merit helped to shape Buddhism's relation to local deities: the devotee transfers merits to the deity, in exchange for the favor of protection by the deity. Thus, the doctrine had a huge role, and a huge impact on the extent in which Buddhism was able to fit in with new cultures and their respective deities. In the period preceding Mahāyāna Buddhism, transfer of merit had already grown to be an important practice.

In later centuries, in many schools of Mahāyāna Buddhism, it was believed that celestial Buddhas or bodhisattvas could transfer merits to devotees to help relieve their suffering. The latter could then share that merit with others. When a bodhisattva transferred his merits, his merits did not decrease in the process, because transfer of merit was seen as a merit in itself. This was called the inexhaustible store of merit. The idea of the bodhisattva transferring merit has led to several Buddhist traditions focused on devotion. According to Gombrich, this is where the entire idea of the bodhisattva is based on, and according to Buddhist studies scholar Luis Gómez, it is the expression of the Buddhist ideals of compassion and emptiness. In Chinese Buddhism, influenced by Pure Land Buddhism, it became common to transfer merit and help the deceased attain the Pure Land.

However, some schools of Mahāyāna Buddhism developed other interpretations on the transfer of merit. The Japanese religious leader Nichiren (1222–1282) believed transfer of merit to be ineffective, because he argued that in this "Age of Dharma Decline" only the devotees' faith and discipline would help them to be saved from suffering and a bad rebirth. In practice, however, Nichiren Buddhism still recognized merit transfer, though not through the clergy as intermediary. On a similar note, some Japanese schools of Pure Land Buddhism, such as the Jōdo Shinshū school, do not perform transfer of merits on doctrinal grounds, though some exceptions occur.

== Role in practice ==
In East Asian Buddhism, the doctrine of merit transfer through offerings to the Saṅgha became widely known through the story of Mulian Rescues His Mother.

Author Sree Padma Holt and scholar Anthony Barber note that merit transfer was well-established and a very integral part of Buddhist practice in the Andhra region of southern India. In addition, inscriptions at numerous sites across South Asia provide evidence that the transfer of merit was widely practiced in the first few centuries CE. In Theravāda Buddhism, it has become customary for donors to share merits during an anumodanā, that is, a teaching given by the recipient monks to the donors to rejoice in their merits done. There is also a custom to transfer merits at certain intervals after a relative has died, starting with the first period of usually seven days, another time after a fifty and a hundred days, and after that, every year. Such merit transfer rituals at intervals may be held at the local temple or at home. In some Buddhist countries, certain days have been considered especially suitable for transferring merit, for example on Wan Sart (Thai: วันสารท) in Thailand. Moreover, a custom exists in Thailand and Laos to dedicate merit to parents by ordaining as monks or novices. Sometimes transferring merit is symbolized by pouring water into a vessel. In East Asian Buddhism, the doctrine of merit transfer through offerings to the Saṅgha became widely known through the story of Mulian Rescues His Mother. The yearly festival which refers to this story is widely celebrated in East Asia, and the main practice during the festival is transfer of merits to deceased relatives.

Merit transfer has developed to become a standard element in the basic liturgy of all main schools of Buddhism. Mahāyāna and Vajrayāna Buddhists transfer merits as part of the 'Seven-part-worship' (Sanskrit: saptāṇgapūjā or Sanskrit: Saptavidhā Anuttarapūjā), (Note: There are also other forms that are practiced, varying from four to eleven parts.) and there is almost no ceremony without some form of merit transfer. In some Theravāda countries, for example Sri Lanka, merit transfer is done at the end of a Dharma teaching service. In a 2002–3 field study among Cambodians, devotees were asked why they sponsored a certain ceremony. One of the most frequent answers was "to dedicate merit to my ancestors". A final example is the role of stūpas (structures with relics): it has been suggested that stūpas were built partly because of merit transfer purposes.

The transfer of merits has grown that important in Buddhism, that it has become a major way for Buddhism to sustain itself. In Japan, some temples are even called ekōdera, which means a temple for merit transfer, and the practice is widespread, though it is usually led by married priests rather than the celibate Saṅgha as in early Buddhism.

In early Buddhism, it was seen as a sign of good character if someone transferred merit to the dead. In the present day, the doctrine of transfer of merit allows communities to engage in merit-making activities as a group, thereby fostering kinship solidarity and enabling social engagement.

== See also ==
- Bodhisattva vow
- Treasury of merit (in Christianity)
