= Mulian Rescues His Mother =

Chinese Buddhist tale about filial piety

- Mulian and his mother Madame Liu (19th century)
- Traditional Chinese: 《目連救母》
- Simplified Chinese: 《目连救母》
- Literal meaning: Moggallāna Rescues His Mother
Transcriptions
Standard Mandarin
- Hanyu Pinyin: 《Mùlián jiù mǔ》
- Wade–Giles: Mu-lien Chiu Mu

Mulian Rescues His Mother or Mulian Saves His Mother From Hell is a popular Chinese Buddhist tale first attested in a Dunhuang manuscript dating to the early 9th century CE. It is an elaboration of the canonical Yulanpen Sutra which was translated from Indic sources by Dharmarakṣa sometime between 265 and 311 CE. Maudgalyayana (Pali: Moggallāna), whose abbreviated Chinese transliteration is Mulian, seeks the help of the Buddha to rescue his mother, who has been reborn in the preta world (in canonical sutra) or in the Avici Hell (in elaborated tale), the karmic retribution for her transgressions. Mulian cannot rescue her by his individual effort, however, but is instructed by the Buddha to offer food and gifts to monks and monasteries on the fifteenth day of the seventh lunar month, which established the Ghost Festival (Chinese: 鬼節; pinyin: guǐjié). While Mulian's devotion to his mother reassured East Asians that Buddhism did not undermine the Confucian value of filial piety and helped to make Buddhism into a Chinese religion, it also reflected strong undercurrents of filial piety that existed throughout Indian Buddhism as evidenced through its canonical texts and epigraphical remains.

The story developed many variations and appeared in many forms. Tang dynasty texts discovered early in the twentieth century at Dunhuang in Gansu revealed rich stories in the form of chuanqi ('transmissions of the strange') or bianwen ('transformation tales'). Mulian and his mother appeared onstage in operas, especially folk-opera, and have been the subject of films and television series. The story became a standard part of Buddhist funeral services, especially in the countryside, until the end of the twentieth century. The legend spread quickly to other parts of East Asia, and was one of the earliest to be written down in the literature of Korea, Vietnam, and Japan.

Another canonical version similar to the Yulanpen Sutra, has Sāriputta as the chief protagonist and is recorded in the Theravāda Petavatthu. It is the basis of the custom of offering foods to the hungry ghosts and the Ghost Festival in the cultures of Cambodia, Sri Lanka, Thailand and Laos.

== Stages in the popularization of a canonical sutra ==
=== Possible Indic precursors of canonical text and early history ===
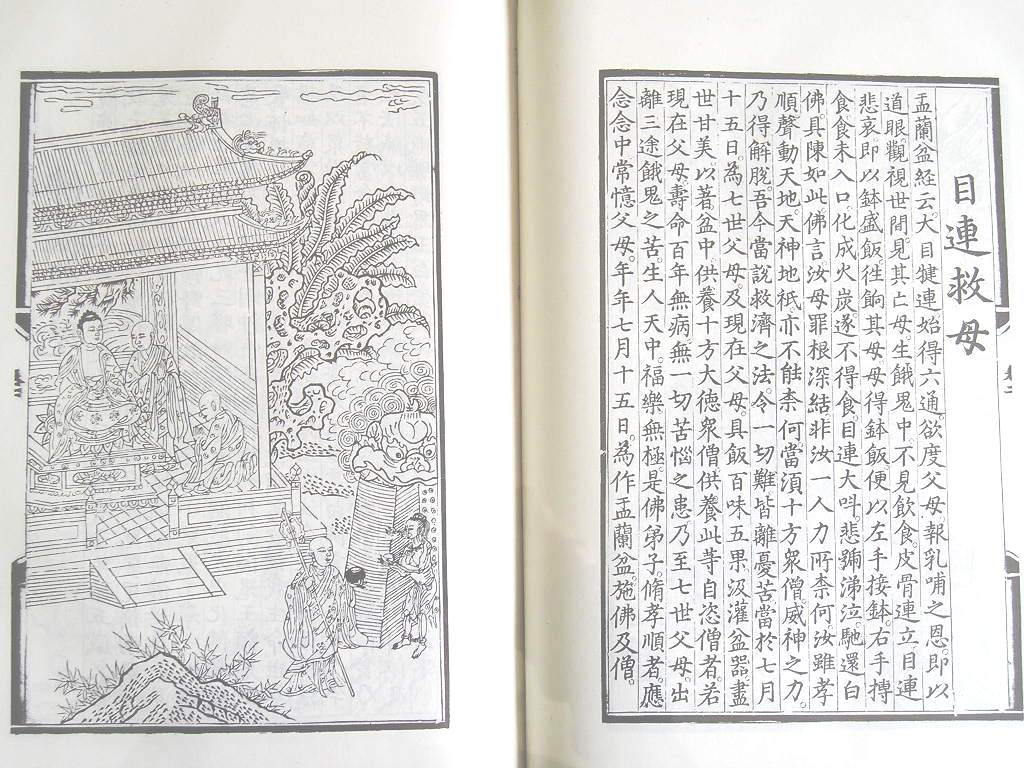
Mulian Intercedes With Buddha to Save His Mother.

The Indian ancient classic epic, the Mahabharata, includes the story of an ascetic, Jaratkaru who sees his ancestors hanging upside down in purgatory because he has not married. His parents begged him to get married so they could be reborn in Heaven. This is based on the Tang Dynasty Sanskrit etymology of the Chinese word 'Yulanpen' said to be derived from Sanskrit 'avalambana' or 'hanging upside down'. Recent studies by Karashima has cast doubts on this and other old etymologies and have affirmed the connection of the Yulanpen holiday with the Pravarana holiday. The Petavatthu No. 14 – The Story of the Mother of Sariputta, a Theravadan scripture in the Pali Canon, contains an account of the disciple Sāriputta rescuing his deceased mother from his previous fifth life as an act of filial piety. Like other accounts in the Petavatthu, it also records the reasons for her rebirth into the preta world. The first reference to the Petavatthu is in the Mahavamsa's account of Venerable Mahinda using it to teach Sri Lankans ca. 3rd century BCE. This may be the earliest Indic precursor to the Yulanpen Sutra. Another canonical account can be found in Avadanasataka which is also very similar to the Yulanpen Sutra, Maudgalyayana communicates on the behalf of five hundred pretas with their respective relatives who in turn make offerings on the pretas' behalf to the monastic community. Once the transference of merit is completed, the former pretas are reborn and release from their suffering.

The Yulanpen Sutra or Ullambana Sutra is an Indic text translated into Chinese in the 3rd to 4th century CE, which records the time when Maudgalyayana achieves abhijñā and uses his newfound powers to search for his deceased parents. Maudgalyayana discovers that his deceased mother was reborn into the preta or hungry ghost realm. She was in a wasted condition and Maudgalyayana tried to help her by offering her a bowl of rice. Unfortunately as a preta, she was unable to eat the rice as it was transformed into burning coal. Maudgalyayana then asks the Buddha to help him; whereupon Buddha explains how one is able to assist one's current parents and deceased parents in this life and in one's past seven lives by willingly offering food, etc., to the sangha or monastic community during Pravarana (the end of the monsoon season or vassa), which usually occurs on the 15th day of the seventh month whereby the monastic community transfers the merits to the deceased parents, etc.,

The earliest attested celebration of the festival appears in much later sources, such as the early 7th-century Record of the Seasons of Jingchu (which is a revision of an earlier text with same title from the mid 6th century CE that is no longer extant); however based on references in various literary sources, it may have been celebrated even as early as the late 5th century CE.

The sutra was in part translated and promoted to help reconcile Buddhism with the Confucian ideals of filial piety;however there was already a concept of filial piety within Indian Buddhism which had a large overlap with the Chinese version but also significant differences. (cf. Anantarika-karma).

=== Tang dynasty tales of karmic punishment and redemption ===
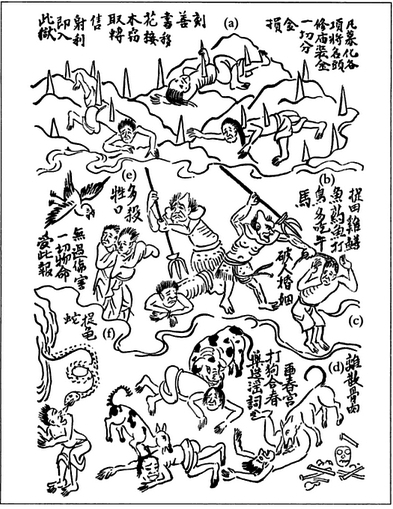
Tortures of Chinese Buddhist Hell, including those who take money intended for temples.

In the Tang dynasty, Mulian was a popular topic of sutra lectures by monks. They often used pictures and songs to amuse their audiences, enriching the Mulian story with many variations and making it thoroughly Chinese. The story-tellers shaped their stories to meet the charge that Buddhism undermined filial piety because it took believers away from their families and prevented them from attending to their ancestors. The written versions of these stories were bianwen, of which a large number were preserved in the library cave at Dunhuang, and was not rediscovered until the twentieth century.

The fullest and most important of these Dunhuang texts is "Maudgalyāyana: Transformation Text on Mahamaudgalyāyana Rescuing His Mother from the Underworld, With Pictures, One Scroll, With Preface." In this text, Mulian's original name is "Radish", or "Turnip," typical Chinese nicknames, and his mother is Liu Qingti.

Before Radish became a Buddhist, he went abroad on business and gave his mother money for feeding monks and beggars. She stingily hides it away, and soon after Radish returns, dies and the Jade Emperor judges that she should be turned over to Yama, ruler of the underworld, and dropped to the lowest order of hell for her selfish deception. Mulian becomes a Buddhist and uses his new powers to travel to heaven. There his father informs him that his mother is suffering extremely in the Avīci Hell, the cruelest of the purgatories. Mulian descends and meets ox-headed devils who force sinners to cross the river to hell and to embrace hot copper pillars that burn away their chests. But by the time Mulian locates his mother she has been nailed down with forty-nine iron spikes. He seeks Buddha's help and is given a rod to smash prison walls and release the prisoners of hell to a higher reincarnation, but his mother is not released. Mulian's mother is reborn as a hungry ghost who can never eat her fill because her neck is too thin. Mulian tries to send her food by placing it on the ancestral altar, but the food bursts into flame just as it reaches her mouth. To rescue her from this torture, the Buddha instructs Mulian and all filial sons to provide a grand feast of "yülan bowls" on the fifteenth day of the seventh month, the time when monks emerge from their summer retreat. When his mother reincarnates as a black dog, Mulian recites sutras for seven days and seven nights, and his mother is reborn as a human again. In the end she is reborn and can attain the joys of heaven.

Filial emotion is vivid in this version. Mulian's mother calls him "my filial and obedient son," while Mulian "chokes and sobs with his tears falling like rain." As in the Yulanpen Sutra, she only can be redeemed by group action of all the monks, not any one monk. Mulian, a good Chinese son, exclaims that the most important thing is "the affection of one's parents and their kindness most profound." As Guo puts it, by the late Tang, "the Buddhist embrace of filial piety seems to have been taken for granted..." and the way was opened for further synthesis in later dynasties".

The stories sometimes use earthy characterization. When Mulian's mother is reincarnated as a black dog, Mulian seeks her out and she concedes that she is better off than she had been as a hungry ghost. As a dog, she says:

"I can go or stay, sit or lie as I choose. If I am hungry I can always eat human excrement in the privy; if I am thirsty, I can always quench my thirst in the gutter. In the morning I hear my master invoking the protection of the Three Treasures [Buddha, the Religion, and the Community]; in the evening I hear his wife reciting the noble scriptures. To be a dog and have to accept the whole realm of impurities is a small price to pay for never so much as hearing the word 'Hell' said in my ear."

In another version, "The Mulian Legend," Mulian's mother, Liu Qingti, had been pious but after her husband died took up sacrificing animals to eat meat, resorted to violence, and cursed. When she dies, the Jade Emperor judges that she should be sent to the underworld. Yama, ruler of the underworld, dispatches demons to take her, and she lies to them and to her son, saying that she has not eaten meat or done wrong things. The demons then take her away.

== Operas ==
The folk opera Mulian Rescues His Mother has been called "the greatest of all Chinese religious operas," often performed for the Ghost Festival on the fifteenth day of the seventh lunar month. The performance "presented the mysteries of death and rebirth in scenes whose impact on audiences must have been overwhelming" and which taught the audience religious and moral values, though not always in orthodox form.

In the Ming dynasty, Zheng Zhizhen (Chinese: 鄭之珍) (1518–1595), a native of the Huizhou, Anhui, village of Qingxi, Zhenyuan County, wrote the opera Mulian jiu mu xing xiao xi wen (Mulian rescues his mother). According to local legend, Zheng was blind when he wrote the opera and was restored to full sight by a grateful Guanyin (the legend also has it that when Zheng later wrote a love story he went blind again). Zheng's opera places emphasis on Confucian family values.

== Mulian in the twentieth century ==
On the mainland, the genre started to decline in popularity after the 1920s. However, the Mulian opera revived when it was listed as a National Intangible Cultural Heritage in 2006. But even supporters in the People's Republic see the future as under threat from high-tech television and films. There are several further challenges. In the past, the opera was passed on orally through family troupes which kept their skills to themselves. However, these troupes no longer exist. The opera is difficult to perform. The ghost roles involve acrobatic skills which require years of training. Since it is a genre that has a small audience, performers require government support. Some observers point to signs for hope, however. While traditional village audiences have dwindled, some film stars and celebrities have taken up the art. Local authorities in Huangshan City, Anhui province, have also promoted performances as a tourist attraction.

The performance of Mulian Rescues His Mother in Taiwan (along with other funeral related performances) is gradually disappearing. According to Shixian Yang of Nanhua University, the reasons are threefold:

1. The shows are performed because many of the deceased enjoyed their performance while they were alive. These people are gradually dying out, and because of the changing Taiwanese culture, the shows are no longer as popular as they once were.

2. The growth of the nuclear family and simplification of funeral ceremonies.

3. The performers are mainly middle-aged and elderly. There are few newcomers learning the traditional performances since their clientele is dying out.

== Film and television adaptations ==
Among the many film and television adaptations is a 1957 version, starring popular actor Ivy Ling Po.

== Translations ==
- Mair, Victor, ed. (2011), "A local drama from Shaoxing", The Columbia Anthology of Chinese Folk and Popular Literature, translated by Berezkin, Rostislav, New York: Columbia University Press, pp. 303–9, ISBN 978-0-231-15312-6
- Ma, Y. W.; Lau, Joseph, eds. (1985), "Maudgalyayana Rescues His Mother From Hell" (PDF), Traditional Chinese Stories, Dunhuang Bianwen Manuscript P2319, translated by Eoyang, Eugene (reprinted ed.), Columbia University Press, ISBN 0-231-04058-X illustrated and annotated as Minford, John & Joseph S. M. Lau (2000). "The Quest of Mulian". From Antiquity to the Tang Dynasty. Classical Chinese Literature: An Anthology of Translations. Vol. I. New York; Hong Kong: Columbia University Press; Chinese University Press. ISBN 0-231-09676-3.
- Mair, Victor H., ed. (1983), "Maudgalyāyana: Transformation Text on Mahamaudgalyāyana Rescuing His Mother from the Underworld", Tun-Huang Popular Narratives, Cambridge; New York: Cambridge University Press, pp. 87–122, ISBN 0-521-24761-6
- Waley, Arthur (1960), "Mu Lien Rescues His Mother from Hell", Ballads and Stories from Tun-Huang, translated by Waley, Arthur, London: Allen and unwin, pp. 216–235, ISBN 978-1-135-65119-0 Translation of "Maudgalyāyana: Transformation Text on Mahamaudgalyāyana Rescuing His Mother from the Underworld, With Pictures, One Scroll, With Preface."
- Johnson, David (2000), "Mulian Rescues His Mother", in DeBary, Wm. Theodore (ed.), From 1600 through the Twentieth Century, Sources of Chinese Tradition, vol. II, New York: Columbia University Press, pp. 93–104, ISBN 0-231-51799-8 Excerpts.
- Whitfield, Susan (1999). "The Nun's Tale". Life Along the Silk Road. Berkeley: University of California Press. pp. 155–73. ISBN 978-0-520-23214-3. A popularized retelling of the Mulian story by an imagined Tang dynasty nun.
