= Avadanasataka =

Buddhist anthology in Sanskrit

The Avadānaśataka (A Hundred Tales) is a Buddhist anthology in Sanskrit of one hundred Buddhist avadāna legends associated with the Mūlasarvāstivāda school. The Sanskrit text's composition date is uncertain, with an approximate origin around 100 CE or later, between the second and fourth centuries CE.

The collection likely originated in the northwest Indian subcontinent, with some fragments discovered in the Schøyen Collection, possibly from Bāmiyān. The Mūlasarvāstivāda affiliation is supported by shared passages with the Divyāvadāna and the Mūlasarvāstivāda Vinaya, as well as its textual and thematic parallels. The Avadānaśataka is similar to and possibly from the same milieu as the Aśokāvadāna and the Ratnamālāvadāna.

The text was later translated into Chinese (as Zhuanji baiyuan jing) and into Tibetan. The Chinese translation dates to the late 5th or early 6th century. Tibetan translation occurred in the early 9th century by Jinamitra and Devacandra.

The Avadānaśataka comprises 100 avadāna stories arranged in ten chapters. Each chapter has a central theme:

- Chapter one is on prophecies (vyākaraṇa) of future buddhahood,
- Jātaka tales,
- Prophecies of pratyekabuddhahood,
- Additional jātakas,
- Tales of preta ("hungry ghosts"),
- Rebirths as devas ("divinities")
- 7–9. Stories of male and female disciples attaining arhatship,
- Accounts of suffering caused by past misdeeds.

Each tale follows a three-part structure: A frame story set in the present, a recounting of past deeds causing current experiences, and a narrative bridge linking the past and present actors.

Recurring motifs in these tales include devotion to the Buddha, the merits of generosity (dāna), and the workings of karma. Many stories conclude with a formula highlighting karmic consequences which states: "Black actions bear black fruits, white actions white fruits, and mixed ones mixed fruits. Avoid black and mixed actions; pursue only white."
