= Sādhu (Pali word) =

Pali formula of approbation

Translations of Sādhu
- Sanskrit: साधु (IAST: sādhu)
- Pali: sādhu
- Burmese: သာဓု (MLCTS: sadhu)
- Khmer: សាធុ (UNGEGN: sathŭ)
- Shan: သႃႇထူႉ ([sàa thṵ̂u])
- Thai: สาธุ (RTGS: sathu)

Sādhu (Pāli; Sanskrit, meaning "good", "virtuous", or "excellent") is an expression of approval, affirmation, agreement or appreciation.

In the Pāli Canon, it frequently occurs in the repeated form "Sādhu, sādhu", commonly translated as "Good, good!" or "Well said!". In contemporary Buddhist practice, it is also used to acknowledge meritorious actions, express appreciation, or indicate assent. It can be variously translated as "amen", "good", "yes" "thank you", "I have received", "well done", "so be it".

As a noun in Sankskrit, it refers to an ascetic renunciant.

== Etymology ==
The Pali word 'sādhu' is derived from the Sanskrit root 'sādh' which means 'to accomplish', 'to succeed', or 'to be efficient'. By adding the suffix '-u', it creates the adjective meaning 'accomplished' or 'efficient.' The meaning describes someone who has succeeded in their spiritual or moral endeavors. In classical Sanskrit, its related noun, sādhu refers to a virtuous or holy person who has renounced worldly life to attain a spiritual goal. This term is closely related with the renunciation ideals central to Indian religious traditions such as Hinduism, Buddhism, and Jainism.

== Use ==
=== Ritual ===
The threefold repetition of sādhu is a common Buddhist ritual symbolizing the Three Jewels of Buddhism: the Buddha, the Dharma, and the Sangha.

Sometimes it is repeated a fourth time in a longer and emphatic tone. The reason Buddhists utter the fourth “Sādhu” in such a long manner may be honorific with respect to those who are most disciplined according to the Noble Eightfold Path.

=== A concluding word ===
Sādhu is most often heard as a concluding word in a religious setting. It can be used by all Buddhists, such as monks, nuns, and lay practitioners. It is said after receiving offerings, sermons (Dhamma talk), as well as in a profane context. The preacher usually ends his sermon by wishing for the attainment of Nirvana which is then followed by a concluding in unison of "sādhu, sādhu, sādhu". Buddhists say “sādhu sādhu sādhu” three times to answer a religious question or express their religious feelings if they find that the request is satisfactory.

When a Burmese monk U Tiloka admonished the villagers to refuse to pay land revenue and capitation taxes in order to obtain home rule against the British Empire, he usually concluded his speeches by asking all who accepted his preaching to say sādhu three times.

In some Buddhist traditions like Vessantara Festival, the word sādhu is sometimes followed by the sound of conch or to the sound of a gong to mark the end of each chapter of the recited Pāli stanzas.

=== A good thing ===
"Sādhu" is also used to refer something good. In Dhammapada Verse 35, the Buddha said that it is sādhu to tame the mind.

Hard to hold back, flighty, alighting where it will; it’s good (sādhu) to tame the mind; a tamed mind leads to bliss.

— Dhammapada 35

=== A shout for victory ===
Satho is a cry for joy in ancient Vedic stories and it is still used in Hindu culture as a general shout of approval in battle. In the Thai version of a legend of the Bhagavad Gita translated by Eliakim Littell, the words sathu, sathu, are put in the mouth of the King:

The King will cry: "Sathu, sathu! It is good, it is good!"

=== An exclamation ===
This word was used by the Buddha when devotees asked him about deep or hard issues. Sādhu is therefore occasionally used in the Tipiṭaka as an exclamation. In the Vinaya Piṭaka, to show his appreciation of something Sāriputta had said, the Buddha responded:

Sādhu, sādhu Sāriputta!

— Vin. I,56

=== An opener ===
Sādhu is also used as the opener in prayers to an image of the Buddha. It is also widely used for non-Buddhist uses. For example, the word sādhu is used by soldiers offering obedience to kings, or by believers praying to deities such as Burmese nats and devatas as the opener:

Sathu, sathu, we are so poor and suffering. May the great devata bestow a great blessing on us. May we be granted a child of our own.

— Lao Folktales

== Popular culture ==
=== Social networks ===
Sādhu, sādhu, sādhu associated with three folding hands emoticon has become a popular comment on social networks as sign of reverence and encouragement.

=== Music ===
Saathukaan (Thai: สาธุการ) is the traditional melody used by Thai musicians for eulogy and oblation in honour of the Triple Gem, while as special Saathukaan played only by drums is an invitatory for great teachers. Thai pop singer Boom Boom Cash produced a song entitled Sathu (Thai: สาธุ) in May 2018. contemporary worship music in Thailand also translates the Christian blessing as sathu, as in the translation of Blessed be your Name (Thai: เพลง สาธุการพระนาม).
