= 't Zandt =

- Village
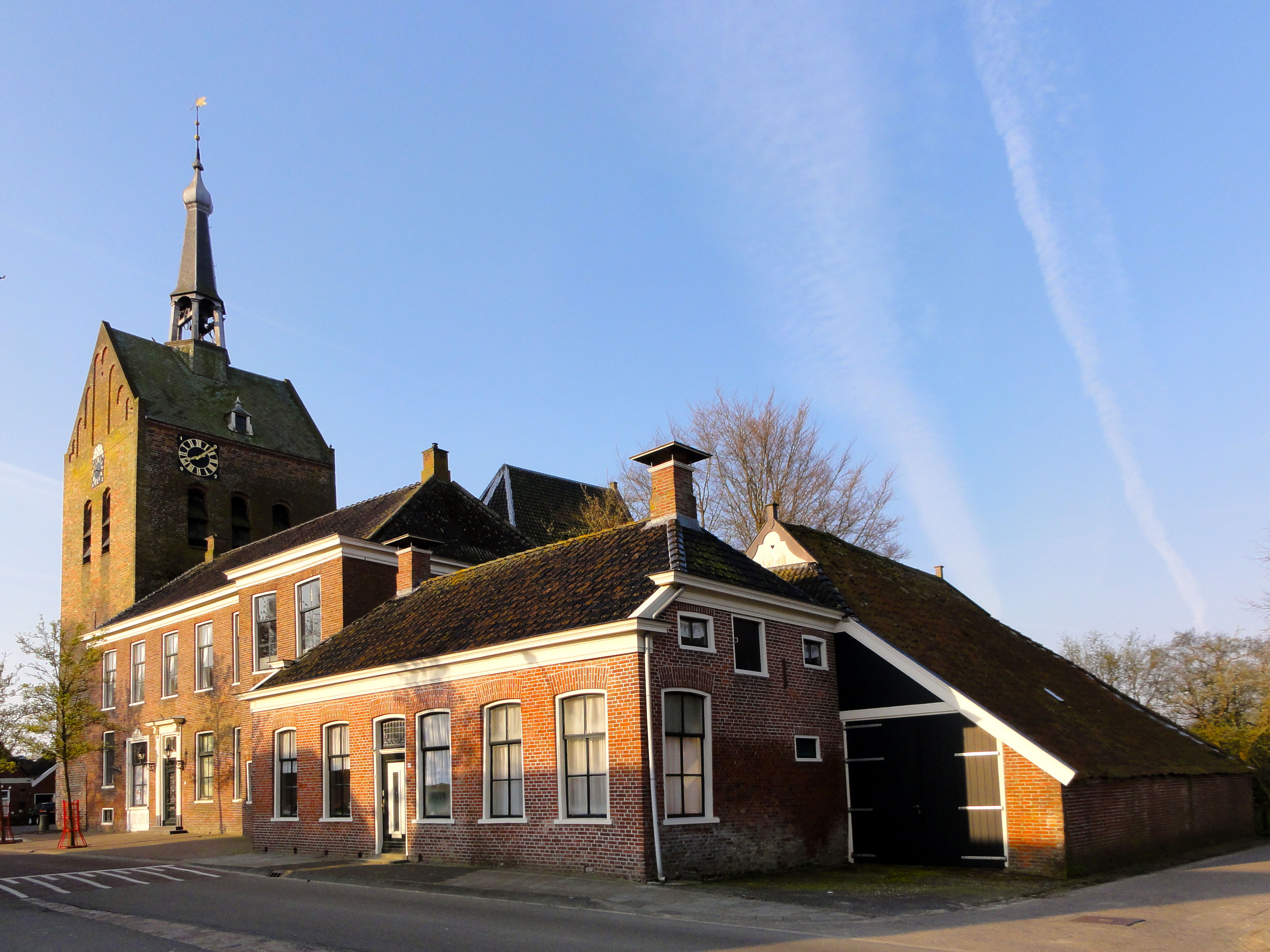
- 't Zandt in 2011

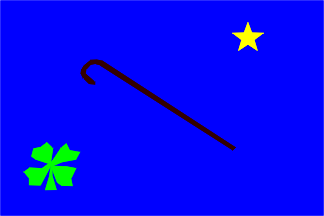
- Flag Coat of arms

- Location of 't Zandt in the province of Groningen 't Zandt (Netherlands)
- Coordinates: 53°21′57″N 6°46′28″E
- Country: Netherlands
- Province: Groningen
- Municipality: Eemsdelta

Area
  - Total: 33.74 km^{2} (13.03 sq mi)
- Elevation: 1.1 m (3.6 ft)

Population (2021)
  - Total: 970
  - Density: 29/km^{2} (74/sq mi)
- Time zone: UTC+1 (CET)
  - Summer (DST): UTC+2 (CEST)
- Postal code: 9915
- Dialing code: 0596

't Zandt (Dutch pronunciation: [ət ˈsɑnt]; Gronings: t Zaand [ˈtsaːnt]) is a village in the Dutch province of Groningen. It is located in the municipality of Eemsdelta.

't Zandt was a separate municipality until 1990, when it was merged with Loppersum. The municipality covered the villages 't Zandt, Zeerijp, Leermens, Eenum and Oosterwijwerd, and the hamlets Zijldijk, Kolhol, Korendijk and 't Zandstervoorwerk.

== History ==
The village was first mentioned in 1257 as "in Sonde", and means sand. That year, the monks of Wittewierum started to a dike in order to polder the former Fivel estuary. The polder was completed in 1266, and a sluice was constructed in 1272. At the intersection of the new dike and the perpendicular older dike, a settlement appeared.

The Dutch Reformed church dates from the late-13th century, and was enlarged in the 15th century. The tower is detached from the church, and dates from the early 13th century.

't Zandt was home to 779 people in 1840. In 1990, it ceased to be an independent municipality and was merged into Loppersum.

== Gallery ==
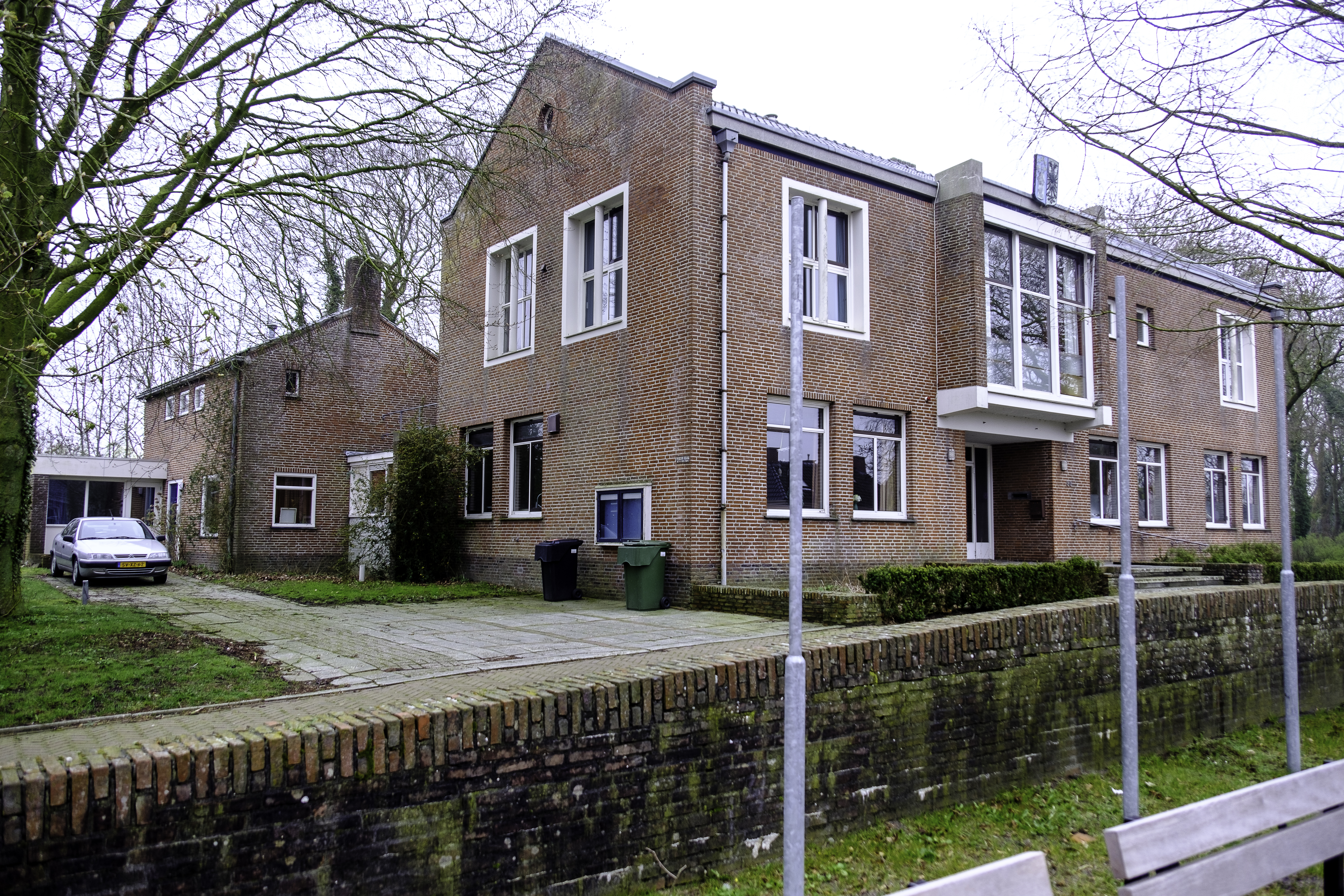
Former town hall

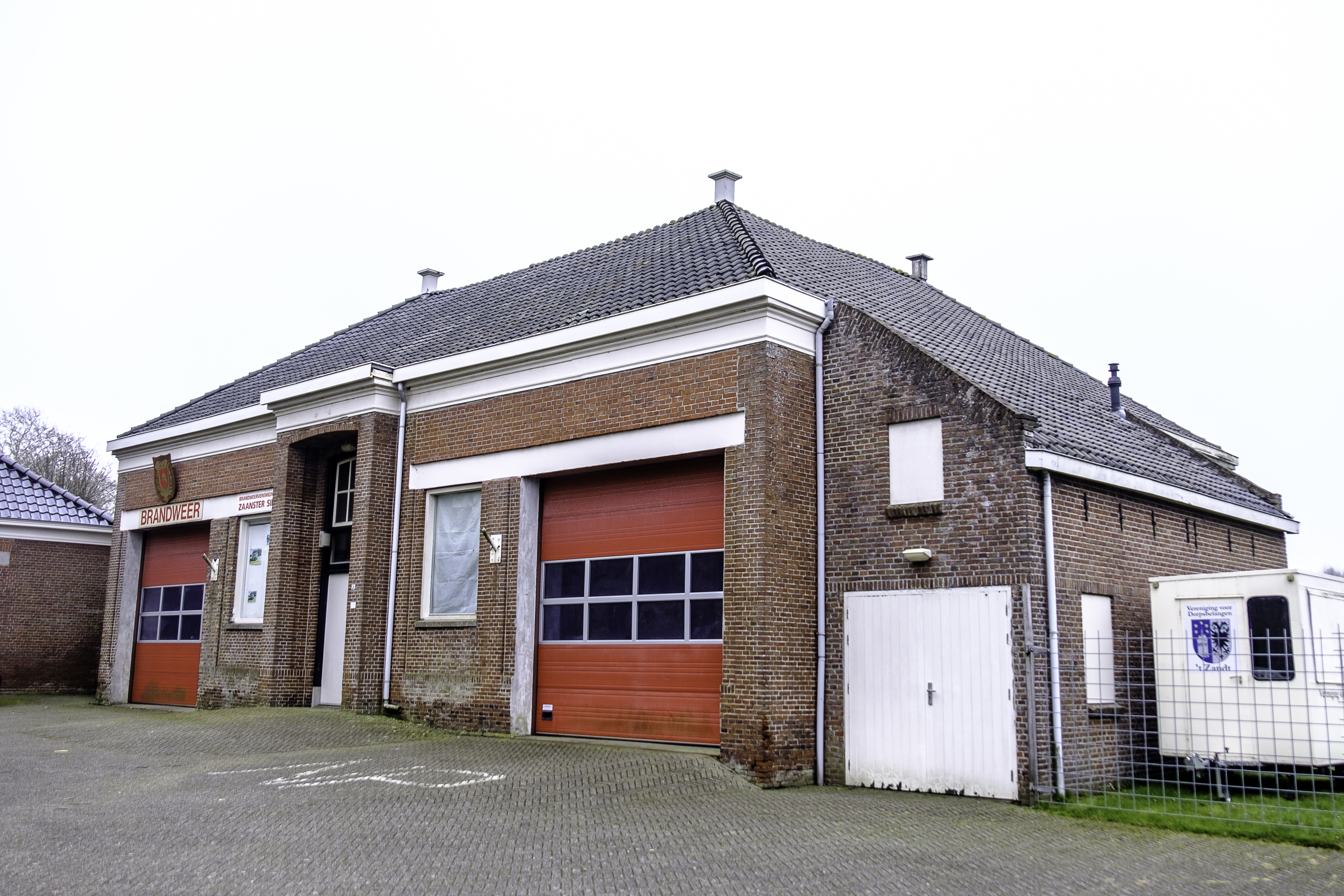
Fire department

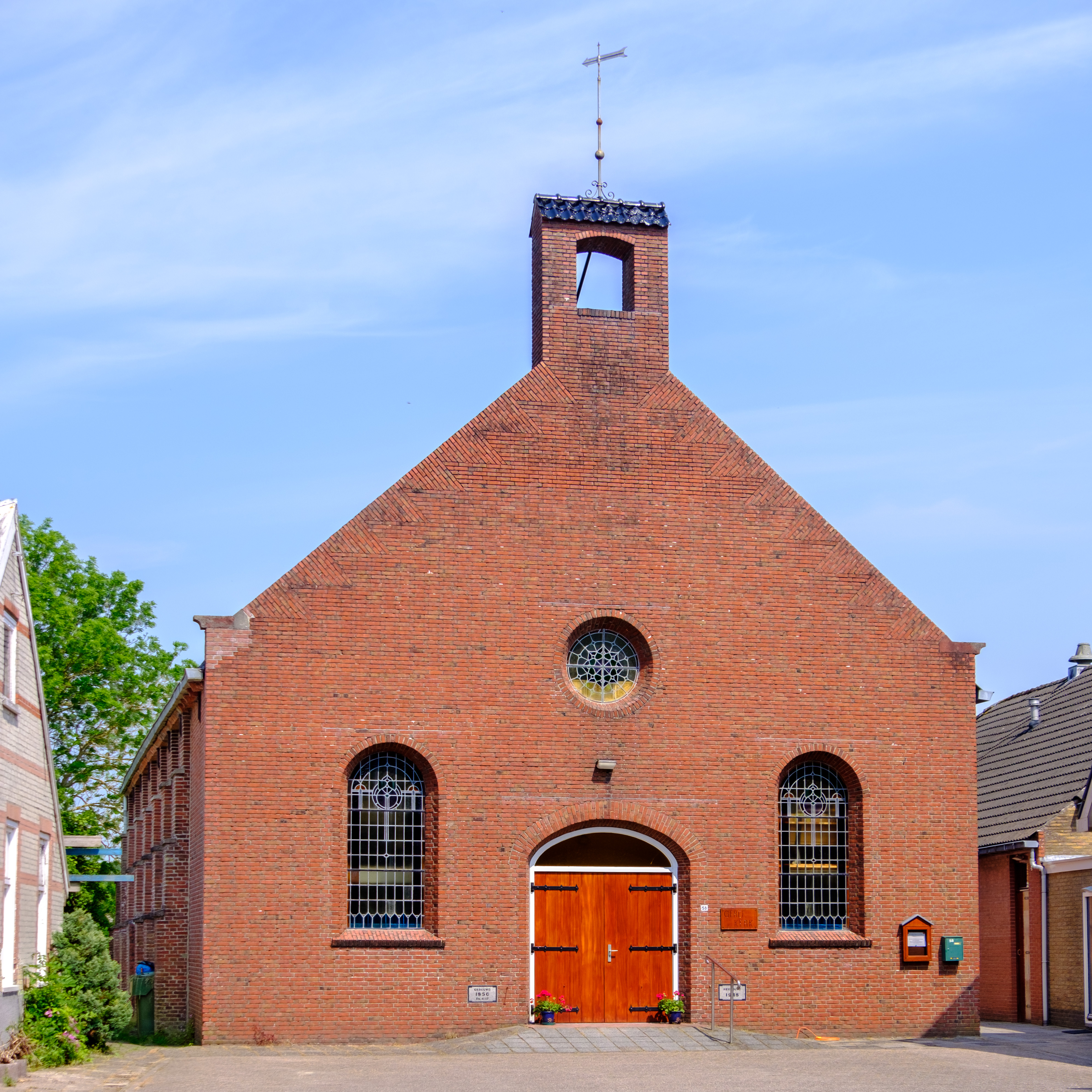
Reformed church

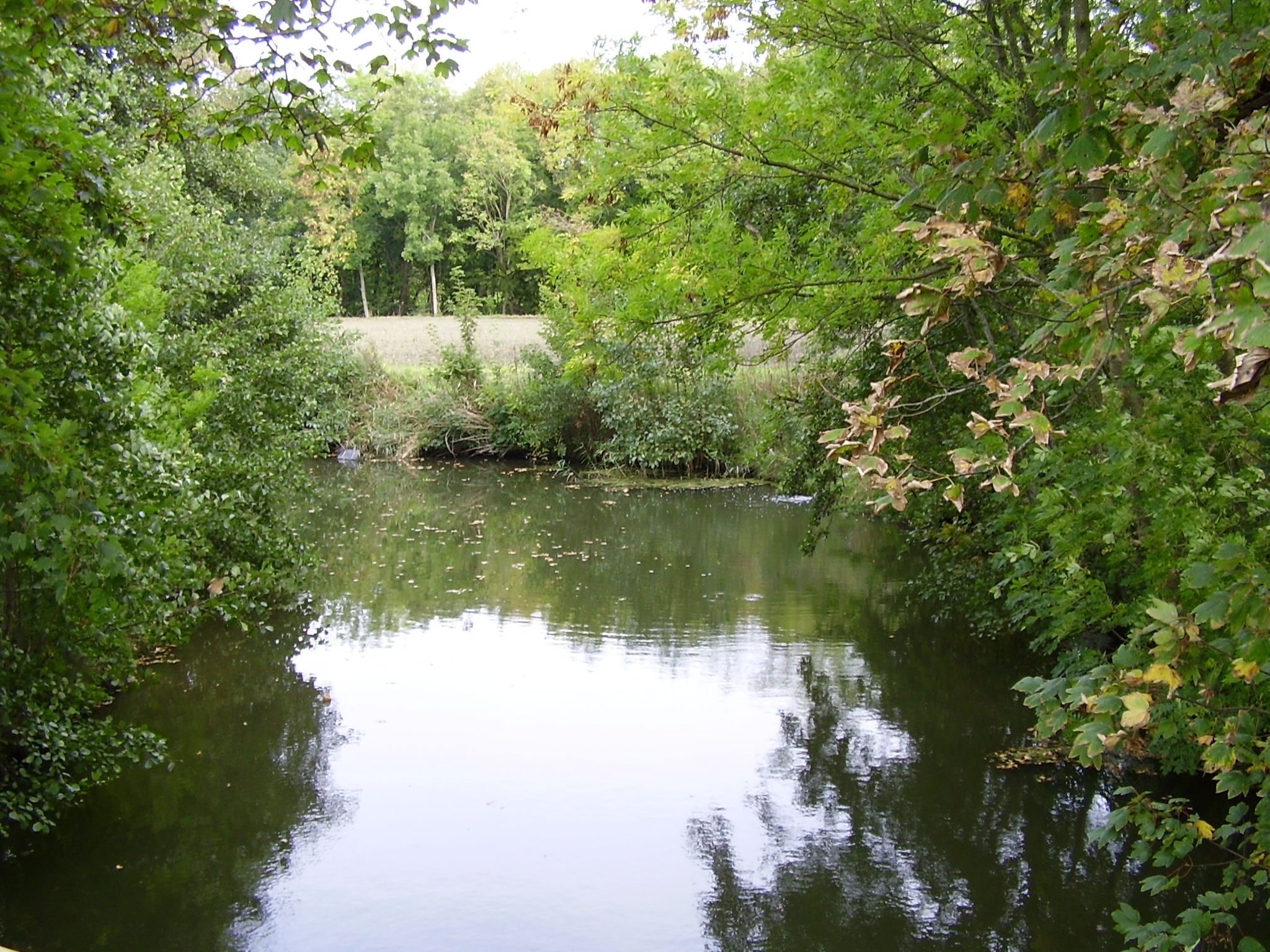
Zandstermaar
