= Gau (territory) =

German term for a region within a country

Medieval duchies (in colour) and gaue in the Holy Roman Empire around year 1000

Gau (German: [ɡaʊ]; Dutch: gouw [ɣʌu]; West Frisian: gea [ɡɪə] or goa [ɡoə]) is a Germanic term for a region within a country, often a former or current province. It was used in the Middle Ages, when it can be seen as roughly corresponding to an English shire. The administrative use of the term was revived as a subdivision during the period of Nazi Germany in 1933–1945, hence Gauleiter. It still appears today in regional names, such as the Rheingau or Allgäu.

== Middle Ages ==
=== Etymology ===
The Germanic word is reflected in Gothic gawi (neuter; genitive gaujis) and early Old High German gewi, gowi (neuter) and in some compound names -gawi as in Gothic (e.g. Durgawi "Canton of Thurgau", Alpagawi "Allgäu"), later gâi, gôi, and after loss of the stem suffix gaw, gao, and with motion to the feminine as gawa besides gowo (from gowio). Old Saxon shows further truncation to gâ, gô. As an equivalent of Latin pagus, a gau is analogous with a pays of the Kingdom of France, or of Lotharingia.

Old English, by contrast, has only traces of the word, which was replaced by scire (modern English shire) from an early time, in names such as Noxga gā, Ohtga gā in SE England, possibly giving Reading, Woking, Abingdon, Hastings. It has been speculatively linked to gōman, ġēman "yeoman", which would then correspond to the Old High German gaumann. However, the Oxford English Dictionary connects the etymology of yeoman to young instead.

=== Conceptual history ===
In the Carolingian Empire, a Gau was a subdivision of the realm, further divided into Hundreds. The Frankish gowe thus appear to correspond roughly to the civitas in other barbarian kingdoms (Visigoths, Burgundians, or the Italian Kingdom of the Lombards). After the end of the Migration Period, the Hundred (centena or hunaria, Old High German huntari) had become a term for an administrative unit or jurisdiction, independent of the figure hundred. The Frankish usage contrasts with Tacitus' Germania, where a pagus was a subdivision of a tribal territory or civitas, corresponding to the Hundred, i.e. areas liable to provide a hundred men under arms, or containing roughly a hundred homesteads each, further divided into vici (villages or farmsteads). Charlemagne, by his capitulary legislation, adopted the comitatus subdivision and appointed local rulers as deputies of the central Imperial authority.

In the German-speaking lands of East Francia, the Gau formed the unit of administration of the realm during the 9th and 10th centuries and ruled by a gaugrave (Gaugraf i.e. "gau count"). Similar to many shires in England, during the Middle Ages, many such Gaue came to be known as counties or Grafschaften, the territory of a Graf (count) within the Holy Roman Empire. Such a count or Graf would originally have been an appointed governor, but the position generally became an hereditary vassal princedom, or fief in most of continental Europe.

== Nazi period ==
De facto administrative divisions of Nazi Germany in 1944

The term Gau was revived in German historical research in the 18th and 19th centuries, and was considered an ancient administration structure of Germanic peoples. It was adopted in the 1920s as the name given to the regional associations of the Nazi Party (NSDAP). Each Gau denoted an administrative region, created by a party statute dated 22 May 1926. Each Gau was headed by a Gauleiter. The original 33 Gaue were generally coterminous with the Reichstag election districts of the Weimar Republic, based on the constituent states (Länder) and the provinces of Prussia. Following the suppression of the political institutions of the Länder in the course of the Nazi Gleichschaltung process and the appointment of Reichsstatthalter (Reich Governors) in 1933, the Gaue became the de facto administrative regions of the government and each individual Gauleiter had considerable power within his territory.

=== Reichsgaue ===
With the beginning of the annexation of neighbouring territories by Nazi Germany in the late 1930s, a new unit of civil administration, the Reichsgau, was established. German-speaking territories annexed to Germany from 1938 were generally organised into Reichsgaue. Unlike the pre-existing Gaue, the new Reichsgaue formally combined the spheres of both party and state administration.

Following the annexation of Austria in 1938, the country, briefly renamed "Ostmark" between 1938 and 1942, was sub-divided into seven Reichsgaue. These had boundaries broadly the same as the former Austrian Länder (states), with the Tyrol and Vorarlberg being merged as Reichsgau Tyrol-Vorarlberg, Burgenland being divided between Reichsgau Styria and "Lower Danube" (Reichsgau Niederdonau, the renamed Lower Austria). Upper Austria was also renamed "Upper Danube" (Reichsgau Oberdonau), thus eliminating the name of "Austria" (German: Österreich) from the official map. A small number of boundary changes also took place, the most significant of which was the massive expansion of Vienna's official territory, at the expense of "Lower Danube".

Northern and eastern territory annexed from the dismembered Czechoslovakia were mainly organised as the Reichsgau Sudetenland, with territory to the south annexed to the Reichsgaue of Lower and Upper Danube.

Following the Axis invasion of Poland in 1939, territories of the Pomeranian and Poznań voivodeships as well as the western half of Łódź voivodeship were reannexed to Germany as the Reichsgaue of Danzig-Westpreussen (which also incorporated the former Free City of Danzig) and Wartheland. Other parts of Nazi-occupied Poland were incorporated to pre-existing bordering gaue of East Prussia (as in the case of Zichenau) and Upper Silesia (as in the case of the Silesian voivodeship with the counties of Oświęcim and Biała).

After the successful invasion of France in 1940, Germany re-annexed Alsace-Lorraine. The former département of Moselle was incorporated into the Gau of Saar-Palatinate, while Bas-Rhin and Haut-Rhin became part of the Gau Baden. Similarly, the formerly independent state of Luxembourg was annexed to Gau Koblenz-Trier, and the Belgian territories of Eupen and Malmedy were incorporated into Gau Cologne-Aachen.

== Legacy in topography ==
The medieval term Gau (sometimes Gäu; gouw in Dutch) has survived as (second, more generic) component of the names of certain regions – some named after a river – in Germany, Austria, Alsace, Switzerland, Belgium, South Tyrol, and the Netherlands.

- Aargau, Switzerland
- Allgäu, Germany
- Bliesgau, Germany
- Breisgau, Germany (^{h/e} English exonyms: Brisgaw/Brisgow)
- Buchsgau, Switzerland
- Chiemgau, Germany
- Eastergoa and Westergoa in Friesland, Netherlands
- Elsgau, Switzerland
- Fivelgo around the Fivel in Groningen, Netherlands
- Flachgau, Austria
- Gau Algesheim, Germany
- Gäuboden, Germany
- Haistergau, Germany
- Haspengouw, Belgium
- Hegau, Germany
- Hennegau (Dutch: Henegouwen; English: Heynowes), French: Hainaut), Belgium
- Hohenschwangau, Germany
- Hunsingo around the Hunze in Groningen, Netherlands
- Huosigau, Germany
- Illergau, Germany
- Kraichgau, Germany
- Linzgau, Germany
- Lungau, Austria
- Oberammergau, Germany
- Pinzgau, Austria
- Pongau, Austria
- Prättigau, Switzerland
- Rammachgau, Germany
- Rheingau, Germany
- Rupertigau, Germany
- Saargau, Germany
- Schwangau, Germany
- Sisgau, Switzerland
- Sundgau, in the southeastern corner of Alsace (Suntgow - ^{h/e} English exonym)
- Tennengau, Austria
- Thurgau, Switzerland
- Ufgau, Germany
- Unterammergau, Germany
- Vinschgau, Italy
- Wasgau, Germany
- Wormsgau, Germany
- Zabergäu, Germany
