= Loppersum =

- Village
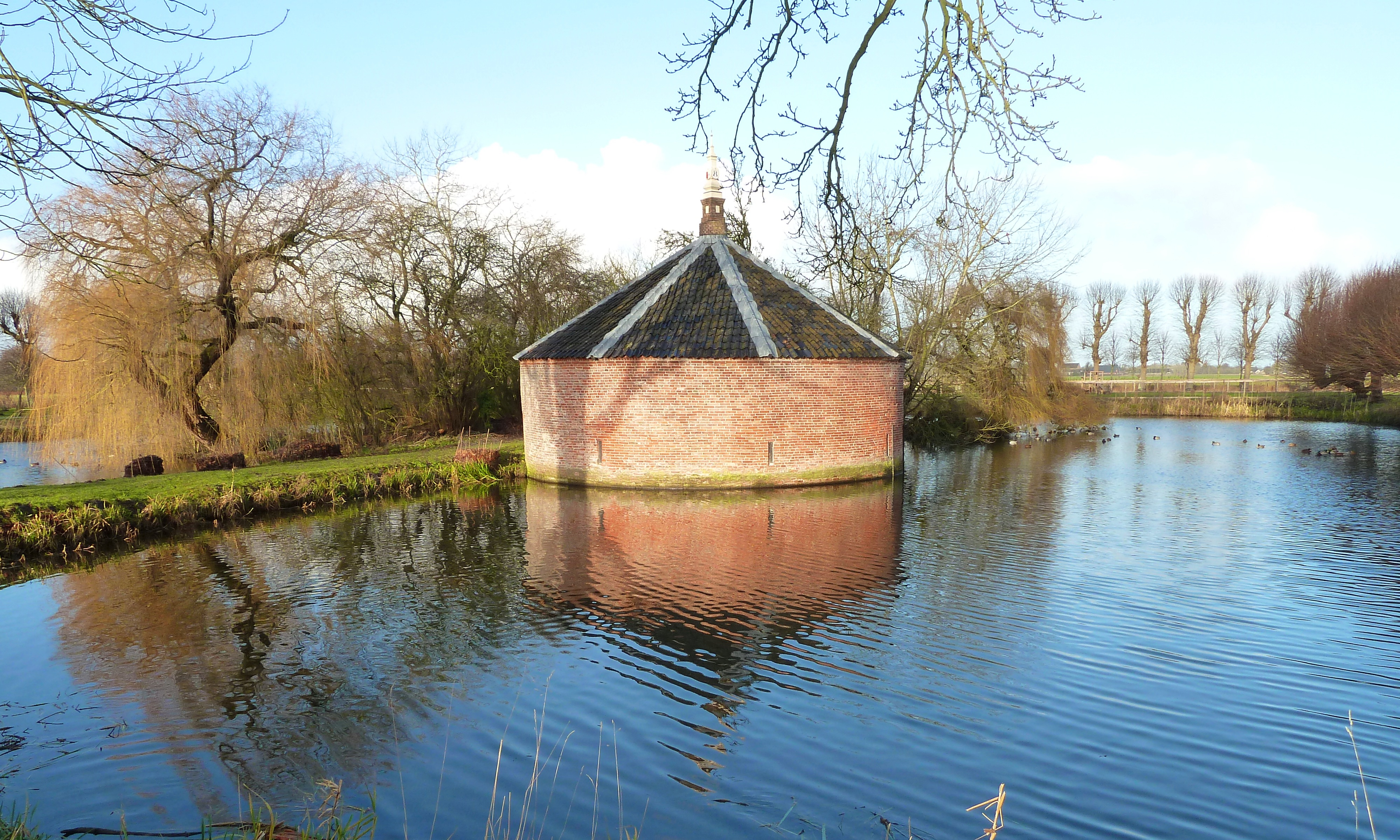
- Defense tower of former Ewsum Castle

- Flag Coat of arms

- Location in Groningen

- Location within Groningen (province) Location within Netherlands
- Coordinates: 53°20′N 6°45′E
- Country: Netherlands
- Province: Groningen
- Municipality: Eemsdelta

Area
  - Total: 25.17 km^{2} (9.72 sq mi)
- Elevation: 1 m (3.3 ft)

Population (2021)
  - Total: 2,570
  - Density: 102/km^{2} (264/sq mi)
- Time zone: UTC+1 (CET)
  - Summer (DST): UTC+2 (CEST)
- Postcode: 9919
- Area code: 0596

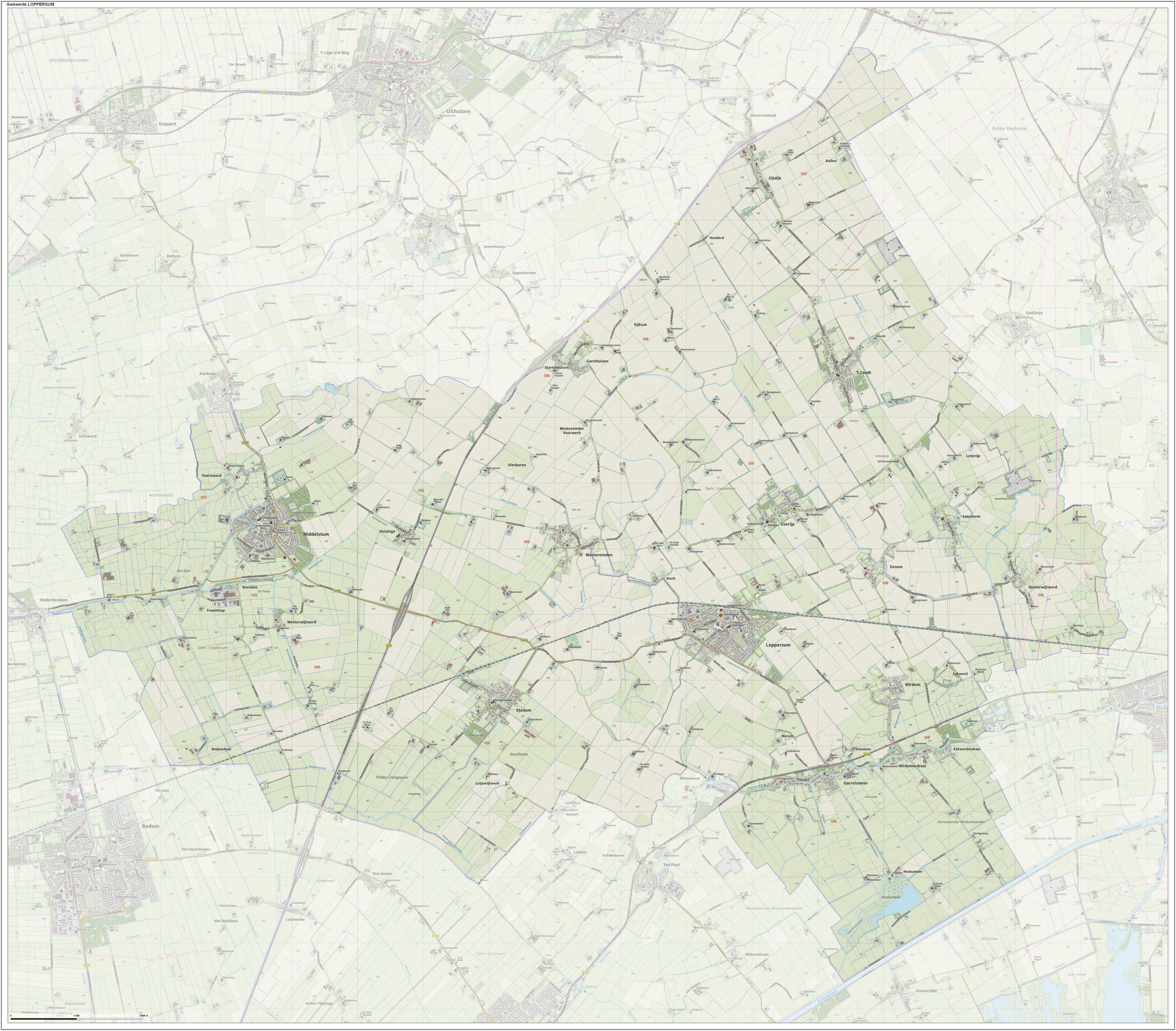
2015 topographic map of the municipality

Loppersum (Dutch pronunciation: [ˈlɔpərsʏm]; Gronings: Loppersom [ˈlɔpɐsɔm]) is a village and former municipality in the province of Groningen in the northeast of the Netherlands.

== Geography ==
Loppersum is located in the province of Groningen in the north of the Netherlands.

The former municipality was bordered by the municipalities of Eemsmond (north), Delfzijl (east), Appingedam (east), Slochteren (southeast), Ten Boer (south), and Bedum (southwest).

The population centres in the municipality were:

- Eekwerd
- Eekwerderdraai
- Eenum
- Fraamklap
- Garrelsweer
- Garsthuizen
- Hoeksmeer
- Honderd
- Huizinge
- Kolhol
- Leermens
- Loppersum
- Lutjerijp
- Lutjewijtwerd
- Merum
- Middelstum
- Oosterwijtwerd
- Startenhuizen
- Stedum
- Stork
- Toornwerd
- Westeremden
- Westerwijtwerd
- Wirdum
- Wirdumerdraai
- 't Zandt
- Zeerijp
- Zijldijk

== Government ==
The second to last mayor of Loppersum was Albert Rodenboog of the Christian Democratic Appeal (CDA). He was chosen as best local administrator by the professional magazine Binnenlands Bestuur in 2013.

== Monuments ==
The Petrus en Pauluskerk is a national heritage site (rijksmonument) in Loppersum.

Of the borg of Ewsum in Middelstum a single defense tower remains today.

== Transportation ==
The Groningen–Delfzijl railway runs through the municipality from east to west with the railway stations of Stedum and Loppersum.

== Notable residents ==
- Titia van der Tuuk (1854 in 't Zandt – 1939) a Dutch feminist atheist and teetotal, vegetarian pacifist
- Johannes de Groot (1914 in Garrelsweer – 1972) a Dutch mathematician and topologist
- Jan Pesman (1931 in Stedum – 2014) a Dutch long-distance speed skater, bronze medallist at the 1960 Winter Olympics
- Haijo Apotheker (born 1950 in Loppersum) a Dutch politician
- Laurens W. Molenkamp (born 1956 in Garrelsweer) a Professor of physics, works on semiconductor structures and topological insulators

== Gallery ==
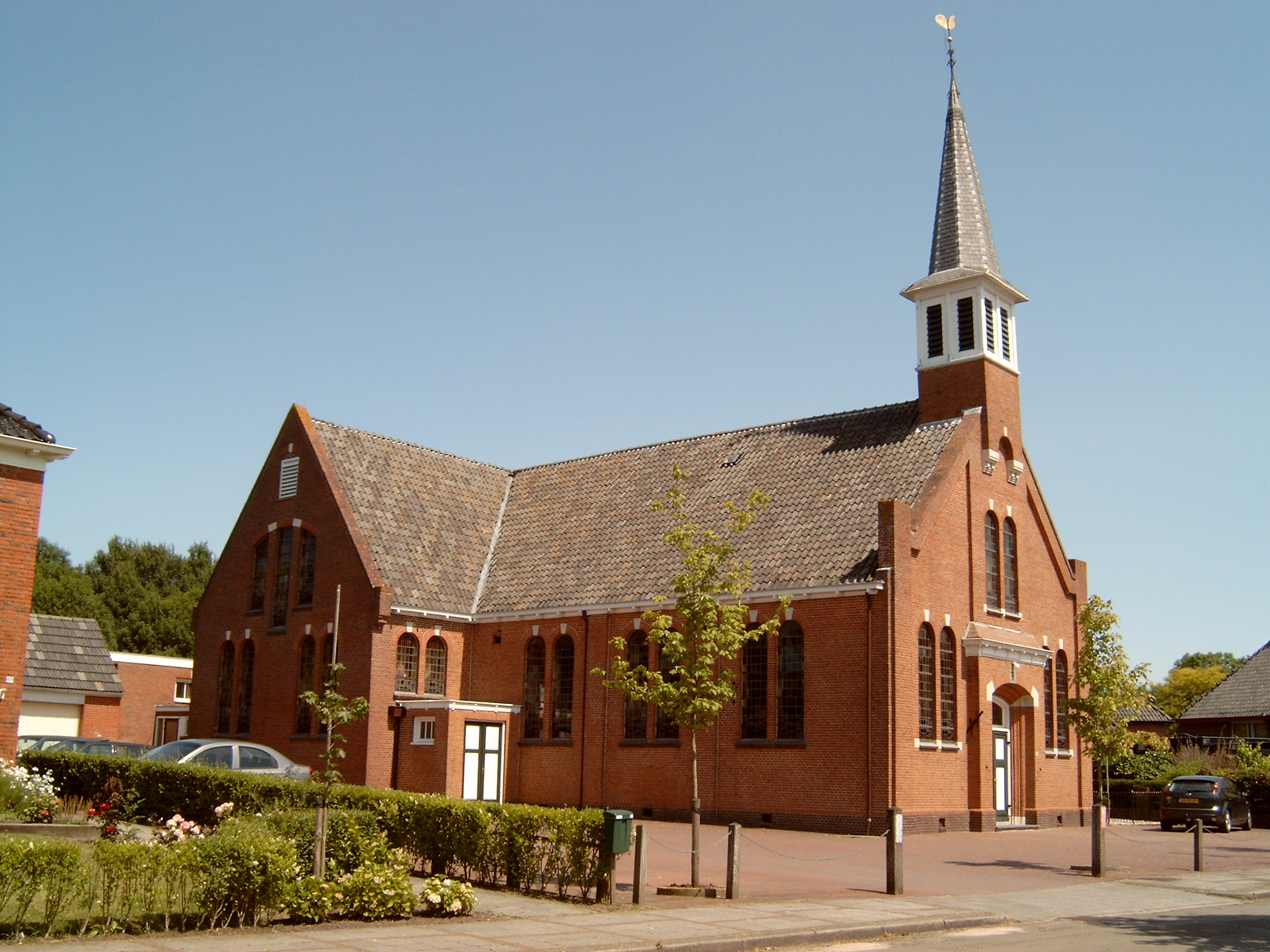
Garrelsweer, reformed church

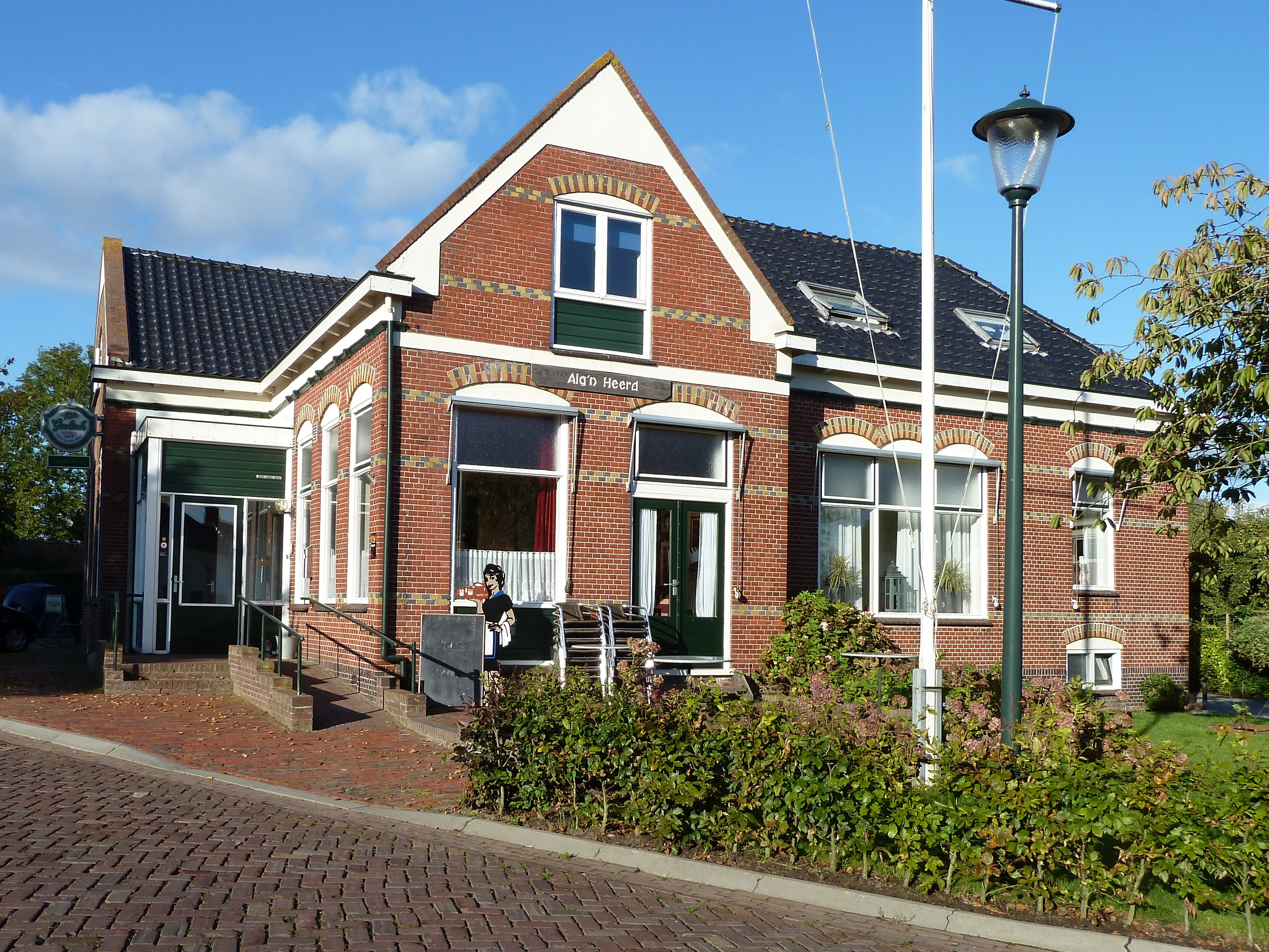
Leermens, dorpshuis

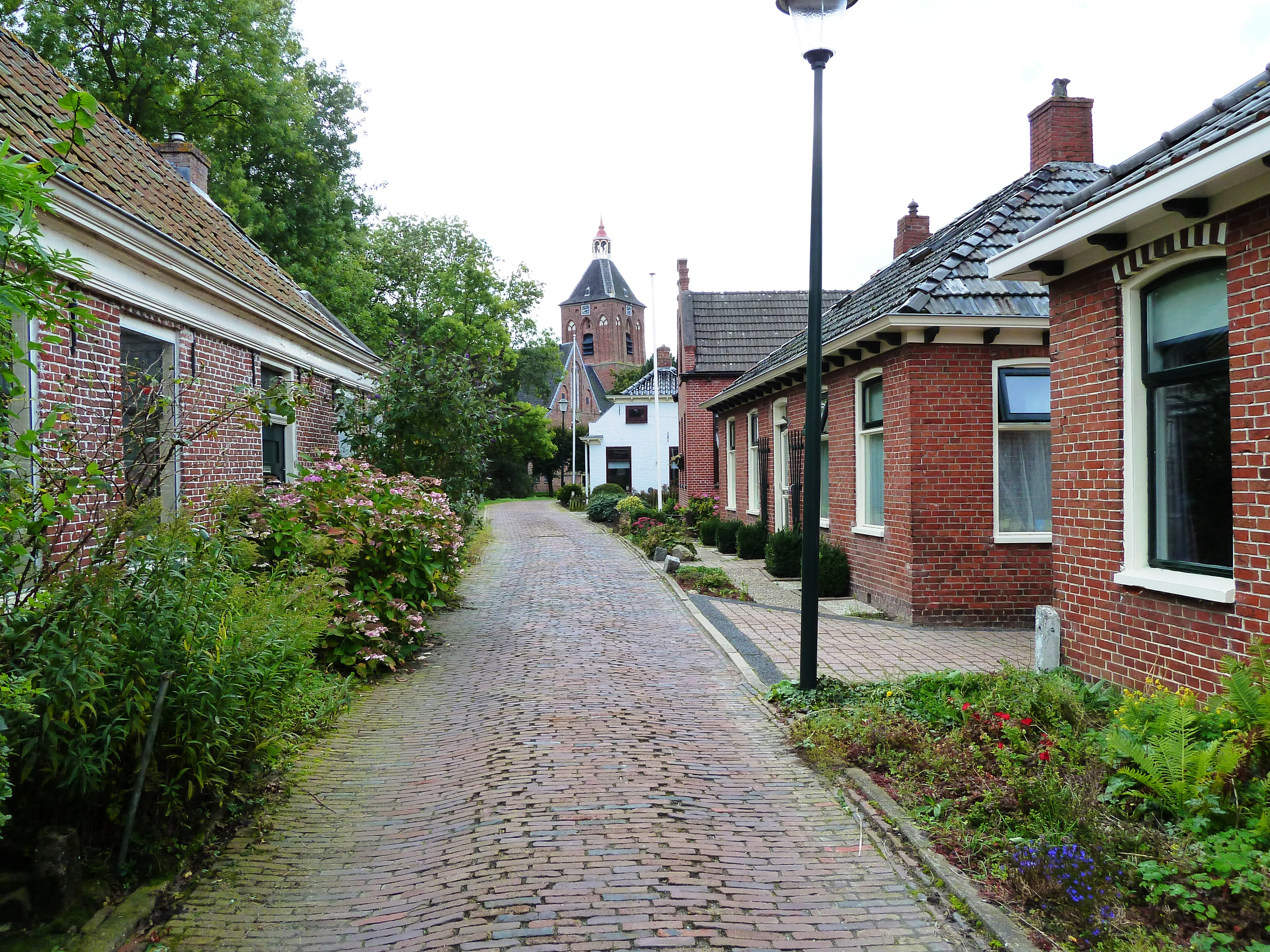
Middelstum, Kerkpad

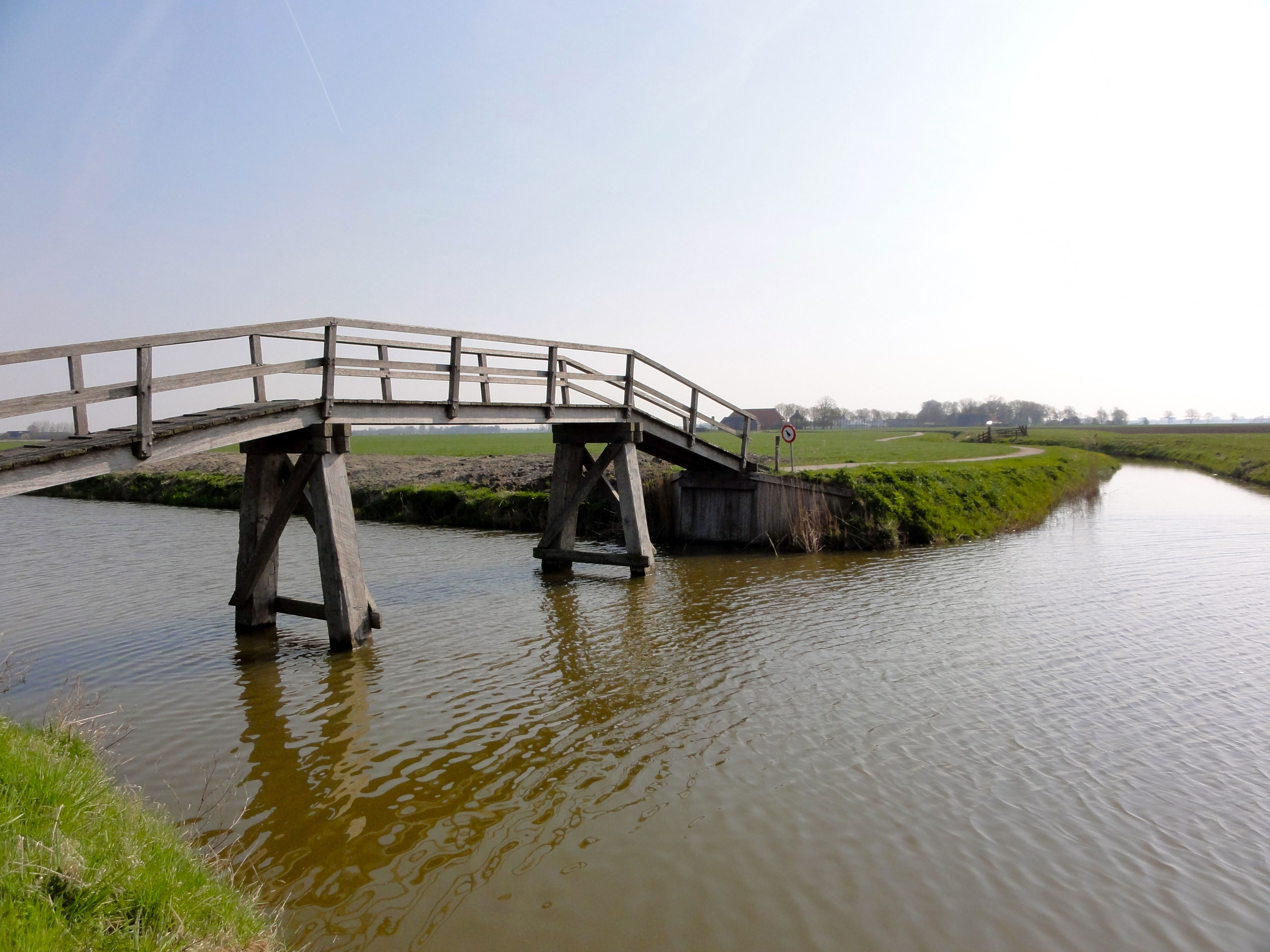
Bridge over the Godlinzermaar
