= Supercompact =

In mathematics, the term supercompact may refer to:

- In set theory, a supercompact cardinal
- In topology, a supercompact space.
