= Masters M85 long jump world record progression =

This is the progression of world record improvements of the long jump M85 division of Masters athletics.

Key

Incomplete information Pending

| Distance | Wind | Athlete | Nationality | Birthdate | Age | Location | Date |
|---|---|---|---|---|---|---|---|
| 3.83 m | +1.1 | Mamoru Saito | Japan | October 1936 | 85 | Maebashi | 11 September 2022 |
| 3.77 m | +0.6 | Saburo Ishigami | Japan | 15 August 1930 | 85 years, 57 days | Kagoshima | 11 October 2015 |
| 3.77 m | +1.6 | Gudmund Skrivervik | Norway | 18 April 1921 | 85 years, 96 days | Poznań | 23 July 2006 |
| 3.75 m | 0.0 | Mazumi Morita | Japan | 17 July 1913 | 85 years, 9 days | Tokyo | 26 July 1998 |
| 3.51 m | NWI | Kizo Kimura | Japan | 11 July 1911 | 85 years, 36 days | Wakayama | 16 August 1996 |
| 3.28 m | NWI | Robert Sattler | Germany | 23 November 1909 | 85 years, 190 days | Ludwigshafen | 1 June 1995 |
| 3.28 m | NWI | Richard Kalbfuss | Germany | 1901 | 87 | Gau Oberhausen | 3 September 1988 |
