= Petrus en Pauluskerk =

Church in Loppersum, Netherlands

Petrus- en Pauluskerk
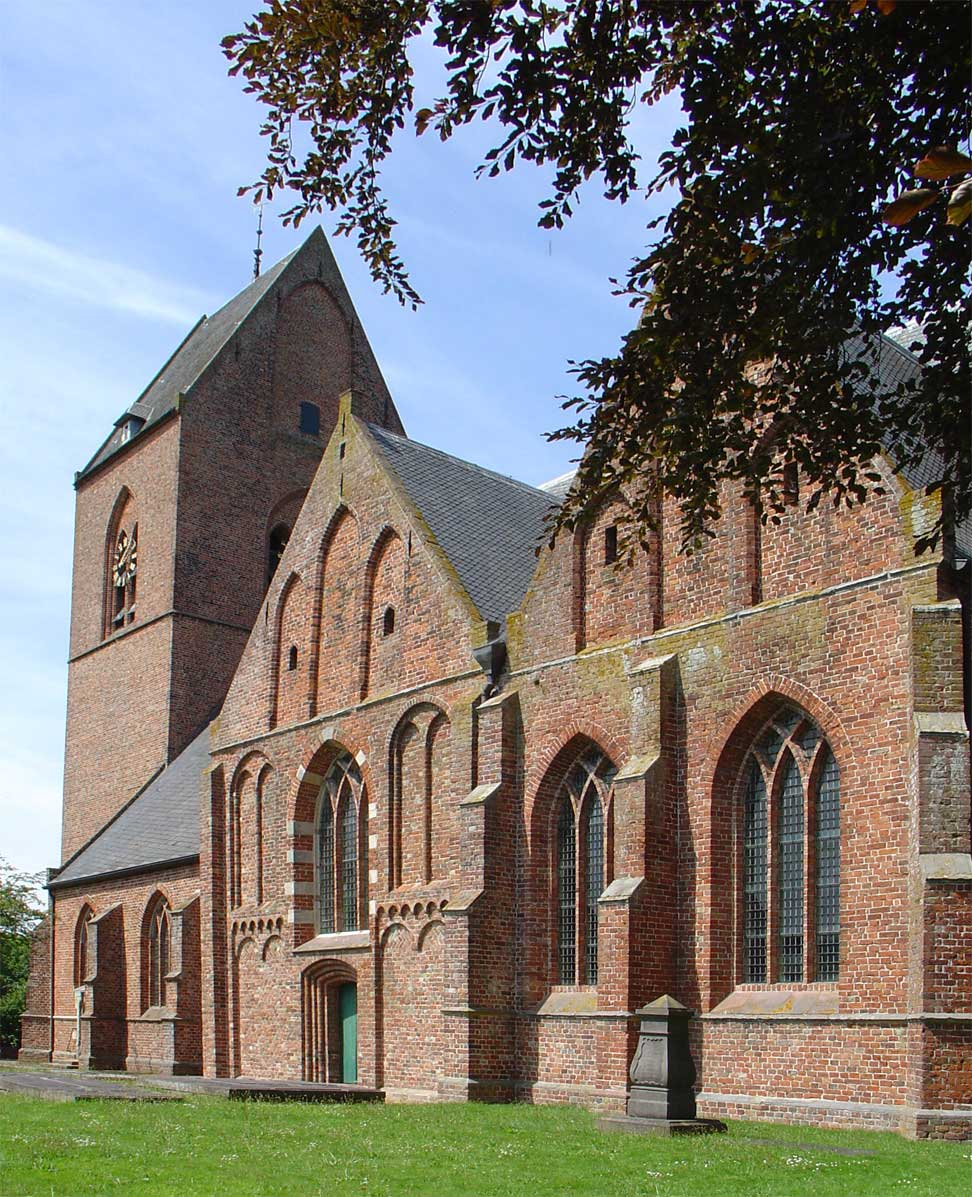
- The Petrus- en Pauluskerk in 2006

- Location in Groningen, Netherlands

Location
- Location: Loppersum, Netherlands
- Interactive map of Petrus- en Pauluskerk
- Coordinates: 53°19′55″N 6°44′51″E

The Petrus en Pauluskerk (English: Peter and Paul Church) is a church in Loppersum, Netherlands. It is a rijksmonument and in the Top 100 Dutch heritage sites.
