= Fivel =

Historical river in the Netherlands

Coordinates: 53.395594°N 6.782517°E

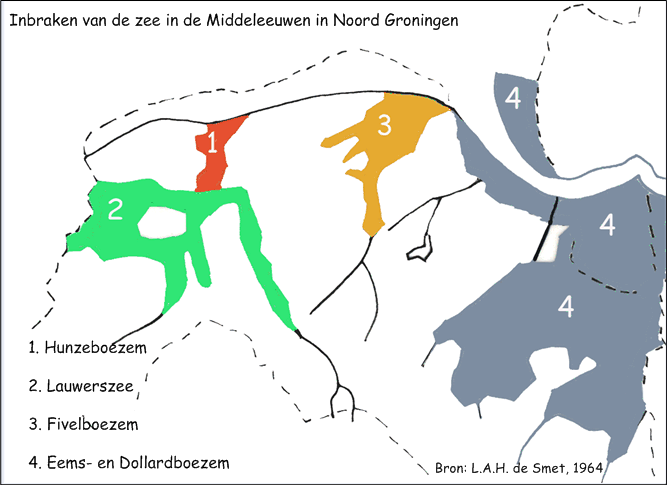
The former Fivel estuary shown in brown (3)

The Fivel was a historical river in the province of Groningen in the Netherlands. It received its water from peat bogs around Kolham and Slochteren, flowed past Woltersum, Wittewierum and Ten Post, and meandered north of Winneweer. The Fivel debouched into a wide estuary of the Wadden Sea.

== Background ==
The banks of this former estuary are still recognizable by rows of villages on artificial dwelling hills (wierden):

- on the east side Garrelsweer, Loppersum, Eenum, Leermens, and Godlinze;
- on the west side Stedum, Middelstum, Kantens, Rottum, and Usquert.

This was Fivelgo, one of the missionary districts assigned to Ludger after Charlemagne had acquired Frisia east of the Lauwers in 785.

In or shortly before the 11th century the Delf was dug, as an east–west waterway for navigation, and also for the drainage of the hinterland when the estuary was silting up. At Winneweer (Muda), the Fivel now discharges into the section of the Delf that became known as the Damsterdiep, running through Appingedam and debouching at Delfzijl. During the Middle Ages, the estuary was increasingly diked until totally reclaimed; the streambed of the Fivel is hardly visible any longer.

== See also ==
- Fivelboezem
