= De Groot dual =

In mathematics, in particular in topology, the de Groot dual (after Johannes de Groot) of a topology τ on a set X is the topology τ* whose closed sets are generated by compact saturated subsets of (X, τ).
