= Johannes de Groot =

Dutch mathematician (1914–1972)

- Born: 7 May 1914; Garrelsweer, Loppersum, Groningen, Netherlands
- Died: 11 September 1972 (aged 58); Rotterdam, Netherlands
- Education: Rijksuniversiteit Groningen
- Known for: De Groot dual Supercompact space
- Scientific career
- Fields: Topology
- Workplaces: Centrum Wiskunde & Informatica, Delft University of Technology, University of Amsterdam
- Doctoral advisor: Gerrit Schaake

Johannes de Groot (7 May 1914 – 11 September 1972) was a Dutch mathematician, the leading Dutch topologist for more than two decades following World War II.

== Biography ==
De Groot was born at Garrelsweer, a village in the municipality of Loppersum, Groningen, on 7 May 1914. He did both his undergraduate and graduate studies at the Rijksuniversiteit Groningen, where he received his Ph.D. in 1942 under the supervision of Gerrit Schaake. He studied mathematics, physics, and philosophy as an undergraduate, and began his graduate studies concentrating in algebra and algebraic geometry, but switched to point set topology, the subject of his thesis, despite the general disinterest in the subject in the Netherlands at the time after Brouwer, the Dutch giant in that field, had left it in favor of intuitionism. For several years after leaving the university, De Groot taught mathematics at the secondary school level, but in 1946 he was appointed to the Mathematisch Centrum in Amsterdam, in 1947 he began a lecturership at the University of Amsterdam, in 1948 he moved to a position as professor of mathematics at the Delft University of Technology, and in 1952 he moved again back to the University of Amsterdam, where he remained for the rest of his life. He was head of pure mathematics at the Mathematisch Centrum from 1960 to 1964, and dean of science at Amsterdam University from 1964 on. He also visited Purdue University (1959–1960), Washington University in St. Louis (1963–1964), the University of Florida (1966–1967 and winters thereafter), and the University of South Florida (1971–1972). He died on 11 September 1972 in Rotterdam.

The complicated academic genealogy of Johannes de Groot and his namesake, Johannes Antonius Marie de Groot

De Groot had many students, and over 100 academic descendants; Koetsier and van Mill write that many of these younger topologists experienced compactification at first hand while trying to squeeze into the back seat of De Groot's small Mercedes. McDowell writes, "His students essentially constitute the topology faculties at the Dutch universities." The deep influence of de Groot on Dutch topology may be seen in the complex academic genealogy of his namesake Johannes Antonius Marie de Groot (shown in the illustration): the later de Groot, a 1990 Ph.D. in topology, is the senior de Groot's academic grandchild, great-grandchild, and great-great-grandchild via four different paths of academic supervision.

De Groot was elected a member of the Royal Netherlands Academy of Arts and Sciences in 1969.

== Research ==
De Groot published approximately 90 scientific papers. His mathematical research concerned, in general, topology and topological group theory, although he also made contributions to abstract algebra and mathematical analysis.

He wrote several papers on dimension theory (a topic that had also been of interest to Brouwer). His first work on this subject, in his thesis, concerned the compactness degree of a space: this is a number, defined to be −1 for a compact space, and 1 + x if every point in the space has a neighbourhood the boundary of which has compactness degree x. He made an important conjecture, only solved much later in 1982 by Pol and 1988 by Kimura, that the compactness degree was the same as the minimum dimension of a set that could be adjoined to the space to compactify it. Thus, for instance the familiar Euclidean space has compactness degree zero; it is not compact itself, but every point has a neighborhood bounded by a compact sphere. This compactness degree, zero, equals the dimension of the single point that may be added to Euclidean space to form its one-point compactification. A detailed review of de Groot's compactness degree problem and its relation to other definitions of dimension for topological spaces is provided by Koetsier and van Mill

In 1959, his work on the classification of homeomorphisms led to the theorem that one can find a large cardinal number, ב_{2}, of pairwise non-homeomorphic connected subsets of the Euclidean plane, such that none of these sets has any nontrivial continuous function mapping it into itself or any other of these sets. The topological spaces formed by these subsets of the plane thus have a trivial automorphism group; de Groot used this construction to show that all groups are the automorphism group of some compact Hausdorff space, by replacing the edges of a Cayley graph of the group by spaces with no nontrivial automorphisms and then applying the Stone–Čech compactification. A related algebraic result is that every group is the automorphism group of a commutative ring.

Other results in his research include a proof that a metrizable topological space has a non-Archimedean metric (satisfying the strong triangle inequality d(x,z) ≤ max(d(x,y),d(y,z)) if and only if it has dimension zero, description of completely metrizable spaces in terms of cocompactness, and a topological characterization of Hilbert space. From 1962 onwards, his research primarily concerned the development of new topological theories: subcompactness, cocompactness, cotopology, GA-compactification, superextension, minusspaces, antispaces, and squarecompactness.
