= Zeerijp =

- Village
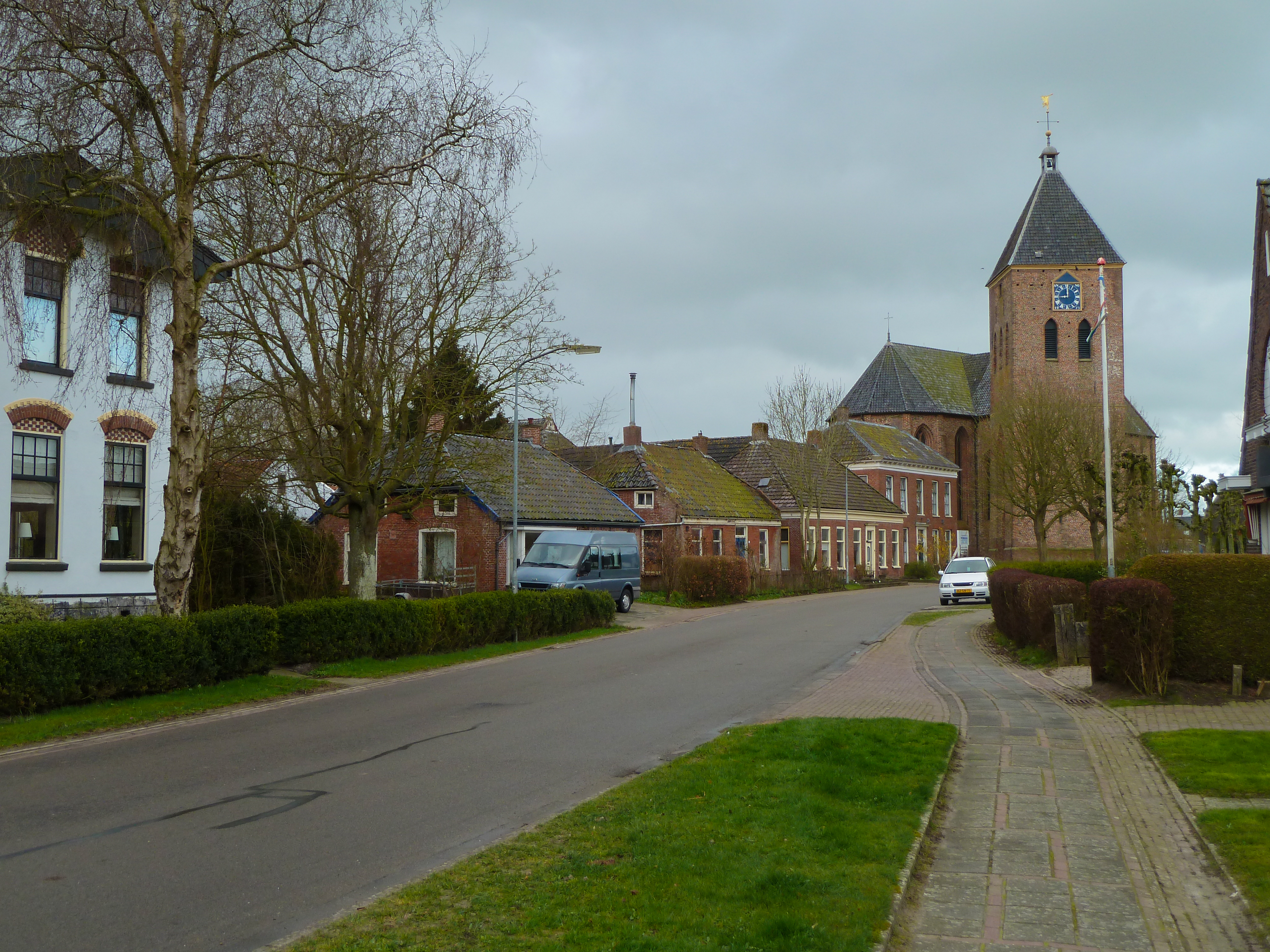
- Zeerijp in 2012

- Location of Zeerijp in the province of Groningen Zeerijp (Netherlands)
- Coordinates: 53°20′53″N 6°45′42″E
- Country: Netherlands
- Province: Groningen
- Municipality: Eemsdelta

Area
  - Total: 0.48 km^{2} (0.19 sq mi)
- Elevation: 0.1 m (0.33 ft)

Population (2021)
  - Total: 420
  - Density: 870/km^{2} (2,300/sq mi)
- Time zone: UTC+1 (CET)
  - Summer (DST): UTC+2 (CEST)
- Postal code: 9914
- Dialing code: 0596

Zeerijp (Dutch pronunciation: [zeːˈrɛip]; Gronings: Zeeriep [zeːˈrip] or Riep) is a village north of city of Groningen. Its most striking building is its brick church for the 14th century with detached bell tower. Formerly dedicated to John the Baptist, now it is a Dutch Reformed church. Also there is a famous organ inside the church, a Faber organ. Because there are so few inhabitants, Zeerijp has no shops, but there is a primary school 'De Wilgenstee' and a cafe. Also, there is a famous mill, 'de Leeuw'. There is also a gold and silver smith, Van Hulsen.

Zeerijp's most recently made the headlines when an earthquake struck the village in January 2007. Earthquakes are extremely rare in the Netherlands; this one, measuring 2.3 on the Richter magnitude scale, was a result of drilling for natural gas.

== History ==
The village was first mentioned in the 10th or 11th century Ripon as means "sea bank". Zeerijp was located on the former Fivel estuary which was connected to the sea It is a dike village which developed into a stretched out settlement.

The grist mill de Leeuw was moved to Zeerijp from Solwerd in 1865 to replace a 1622 wind mill. It was restored between 1974 and 1977.

Zeerijp was home to 508 people in 1840.

== Gallery ==
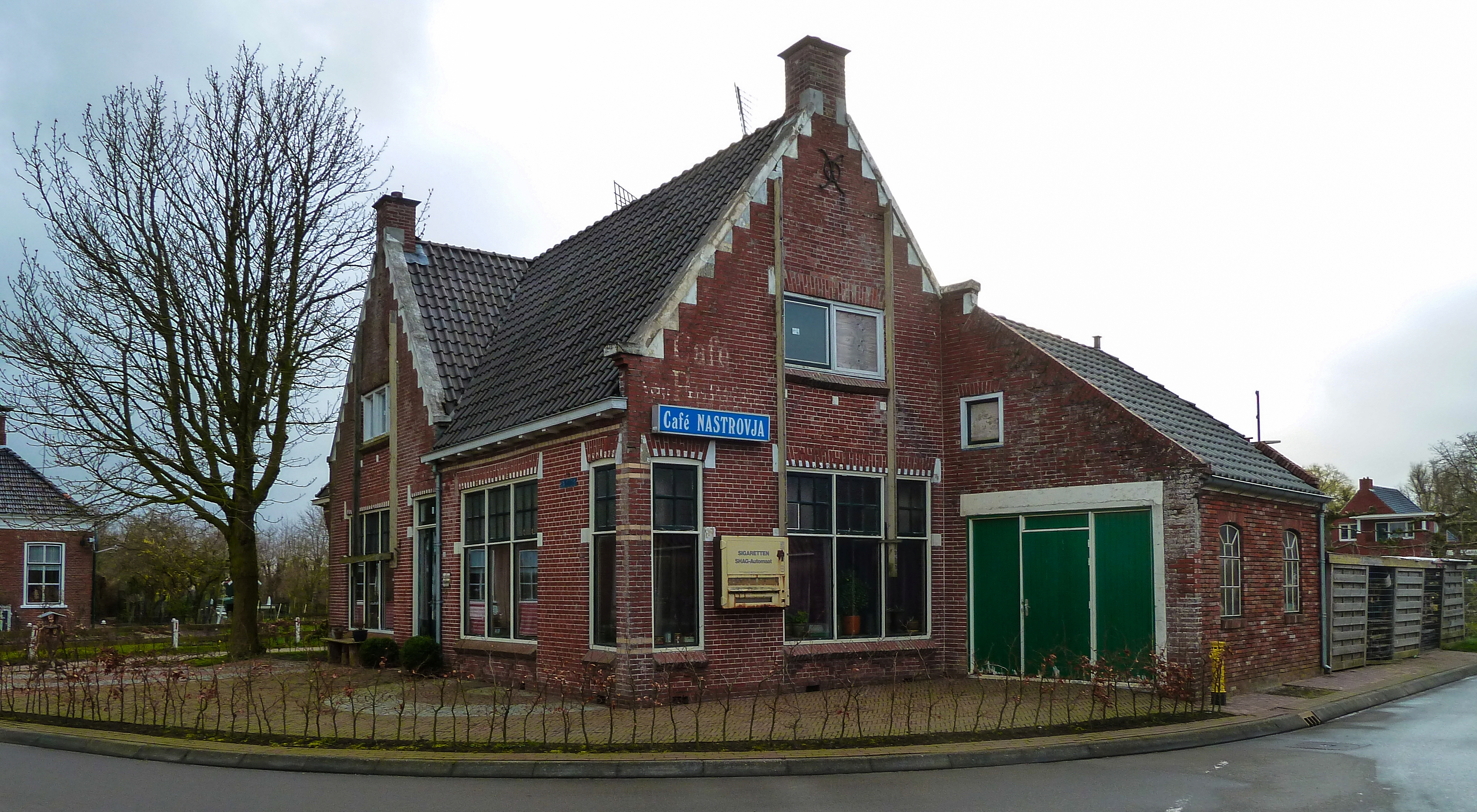
Village pub

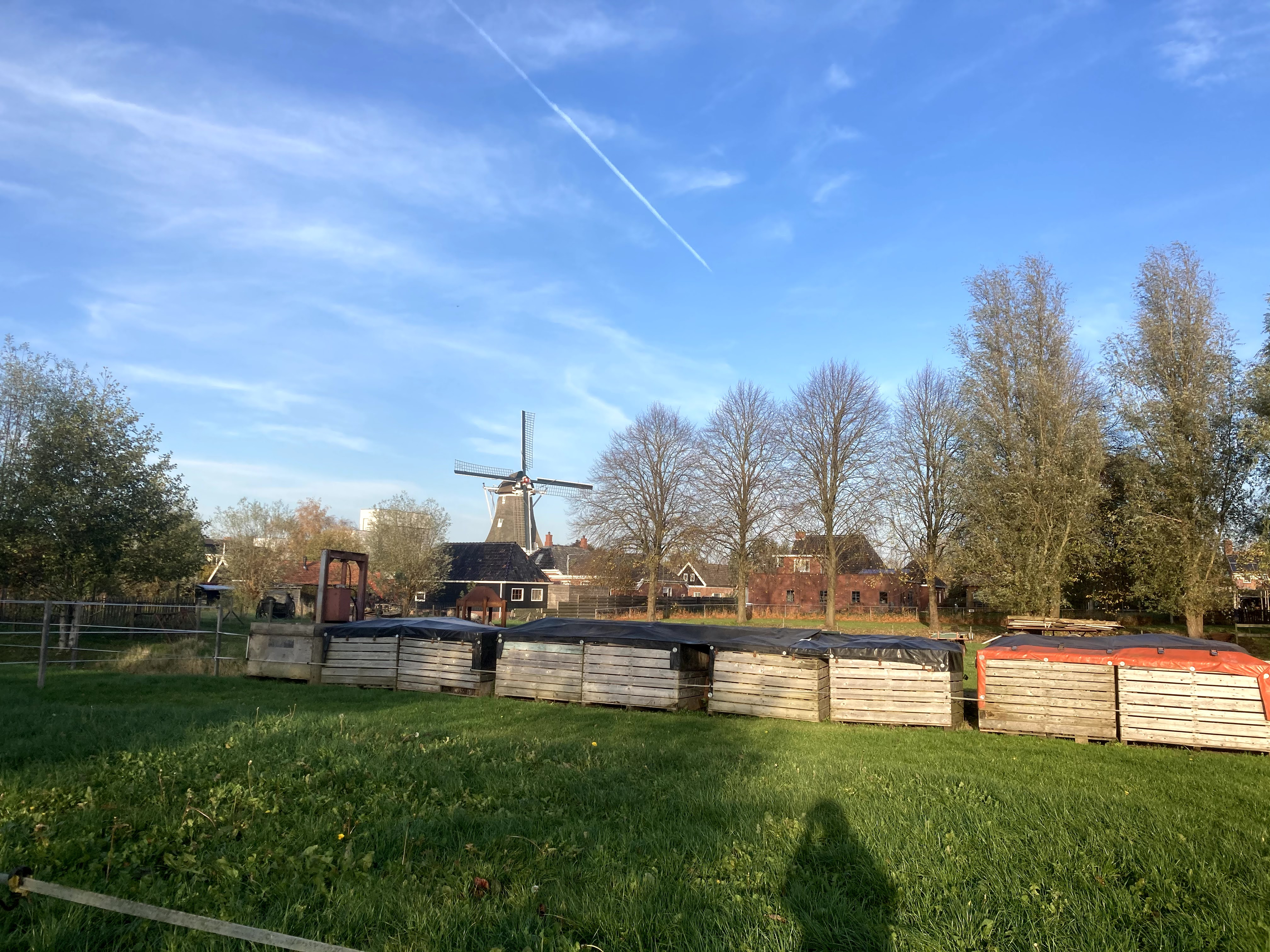
View on Zeerijp

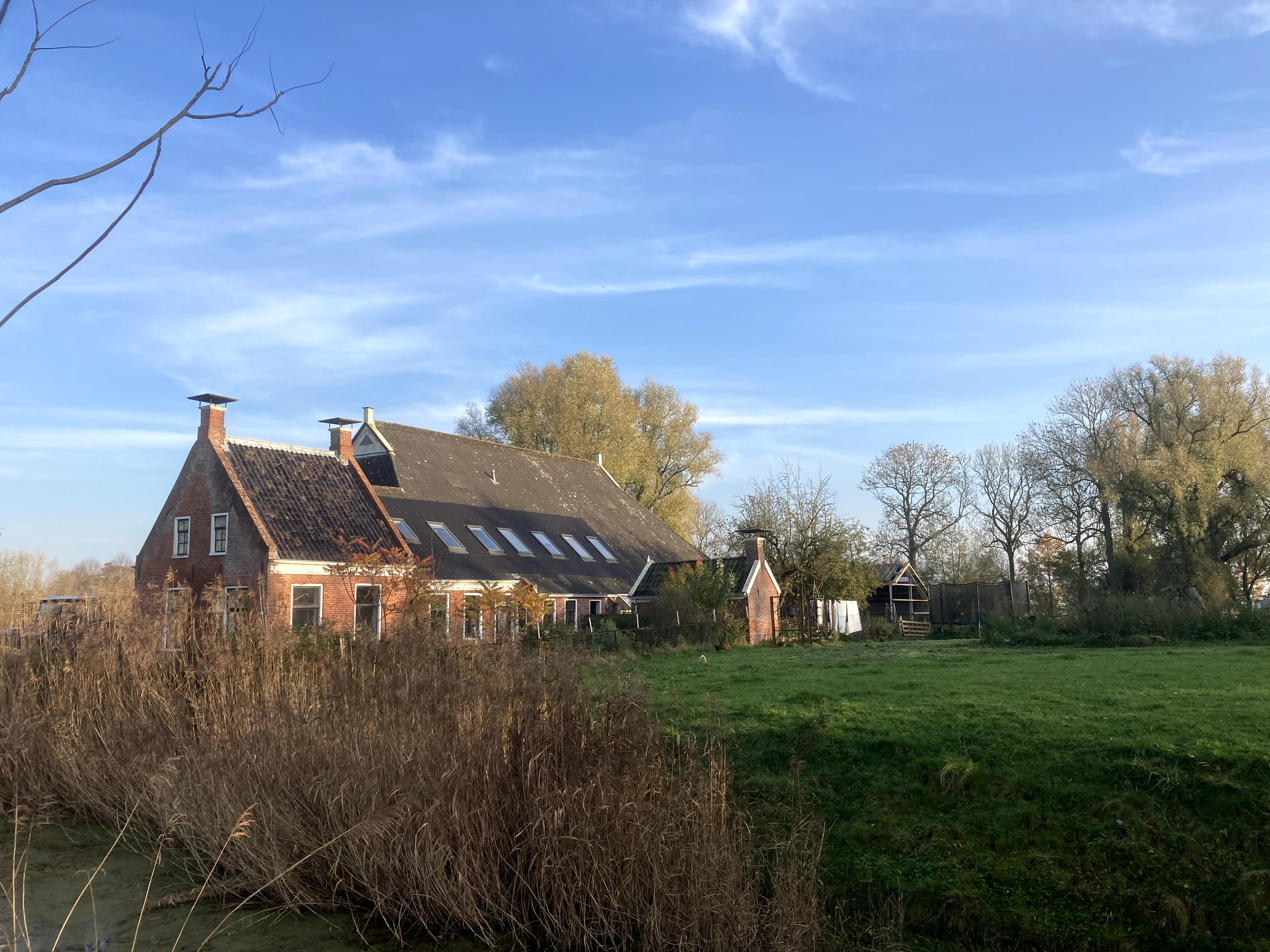
Farm in Zeerijp

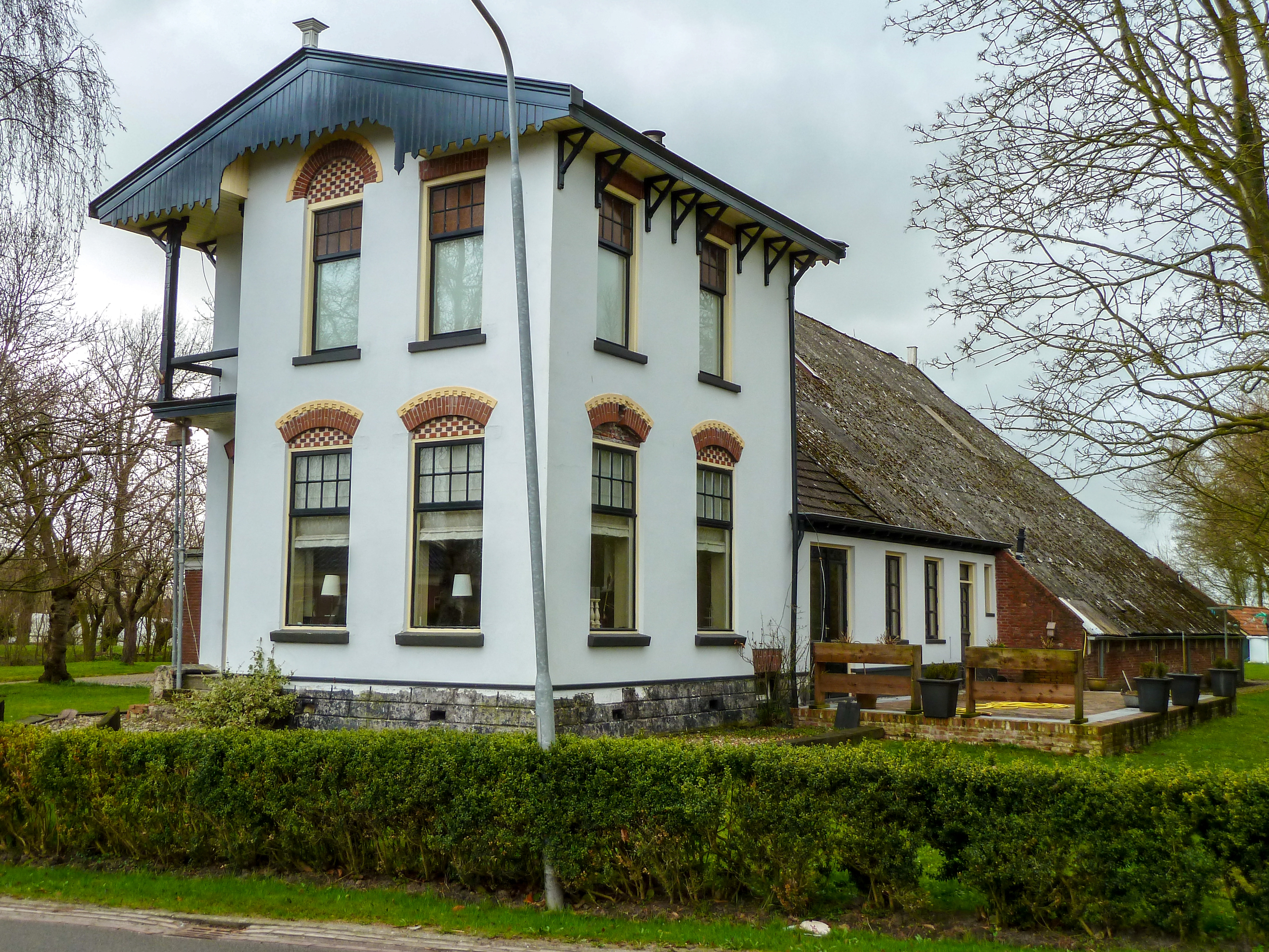
Villa farm from c. 1908
