= Zijldijk =

- Village
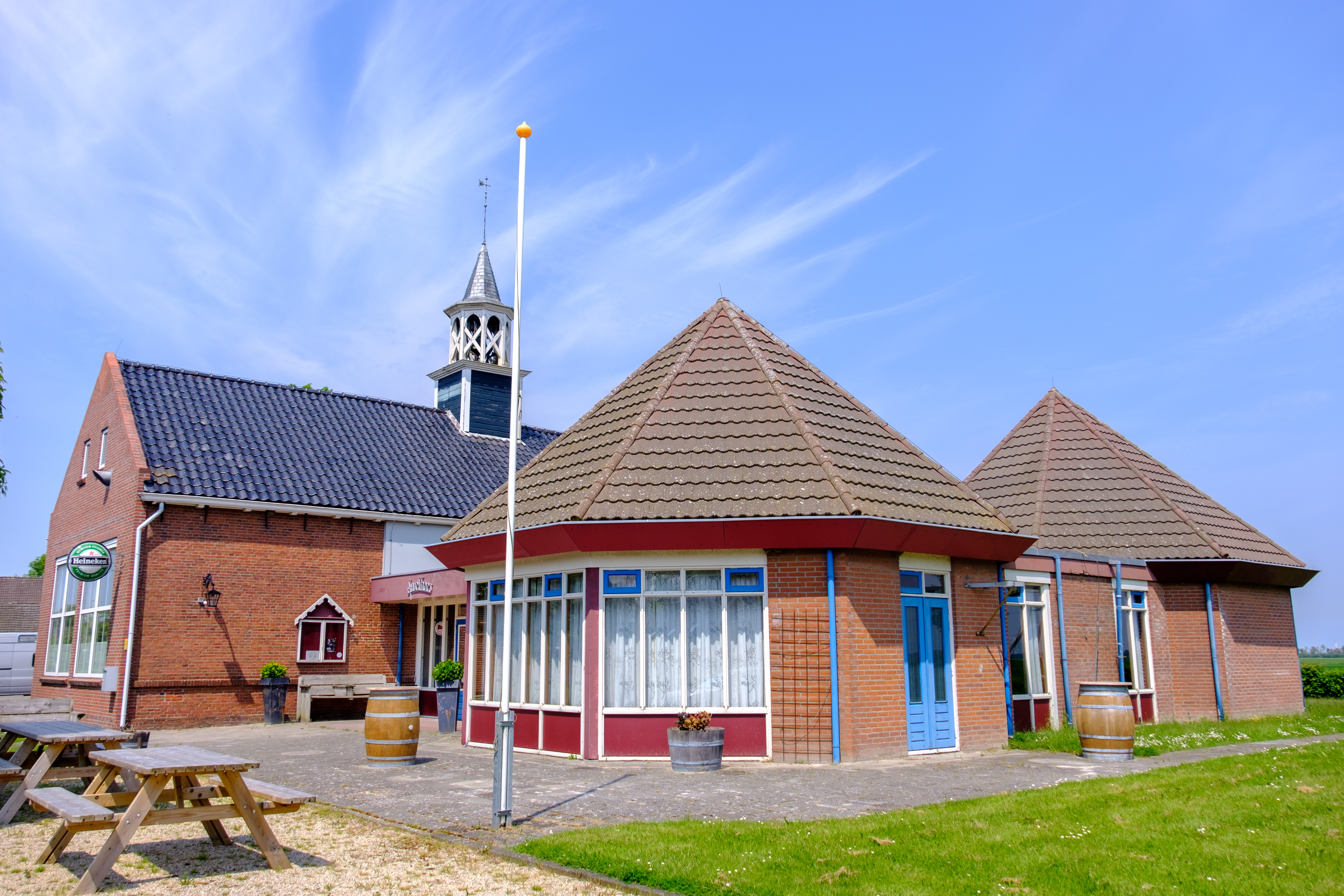
- Village house

- Flag

- Location of Zijldijk in the province of Groningen Zijldijk (Netherlands)
- Coordinates: 53°23′39″N 6°45′21″E
- Country: Netherlands
- Province: Groningen
- Municipality: Eemsdelta

Area
  - Total: 0.14 km^{2} (0.054 sq mi)
- Elevation: 1.0 m (3.3 ft)

Population (2021)
  - Total: 165
  - Density: 1,200/km^{2} (3,100/sq mi)
- Time zone: UTC+1 (CET)
  - Summer (DST): UTC+2 (CEST)
- Postal code: 9987
- Dialing code: 0596

Zijldijk (Dutch pronunciation: [zɛilˈdɛik]; Gronings: Zieldiek [zilˈdik]) is a village in the municipality of Eemsdelta, Groningen, the Netherlands.

It is located along the N46 road between the city of Groningen and the Eemshaven seaport.

== History ==
The village was first mentioned in 1424 as "Ubba Ffockema up den Zyldyck", and means sluice and dike. In 1272, a sluice was built at the site in the newly poldered land around 't Zandt. In 1317, a dike was built northwards towards Uithuizermeeden. In 1444, the land to the east of Zijldijk was poldered and the sluice became obsolete.

Zijldijk has three churches. The Mennonite church was built in 1772 in a non conspicuous barn-like building. It is still in use as a church. The Dutch Reformed church has been reconstructed as a village house. The Reformed Church was constructed in 1886, and nowadays serves as a care facility.

Zijldijk was home to 454 people in 1840.

== Gallery ==
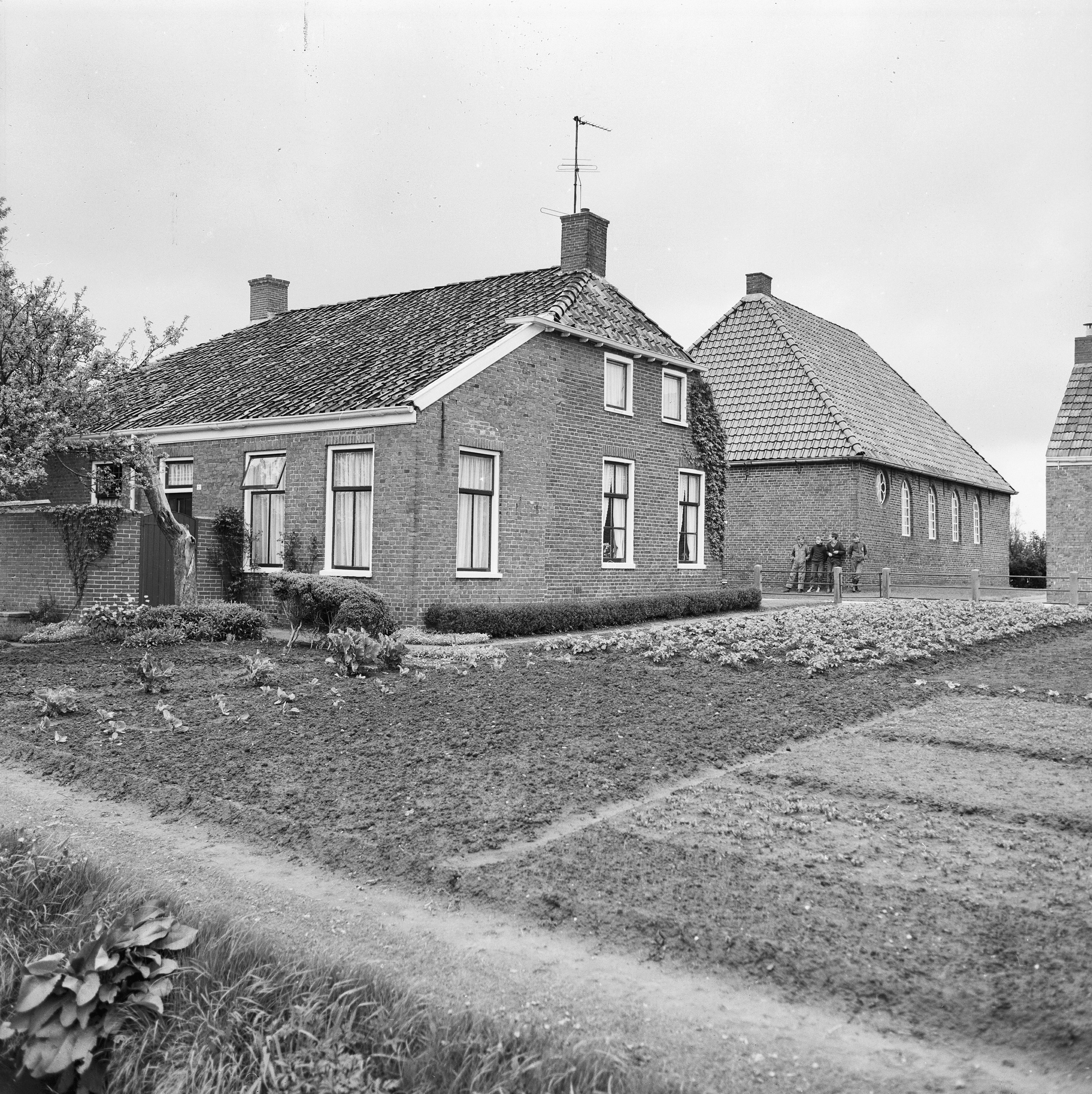
Zijldijk in 1969

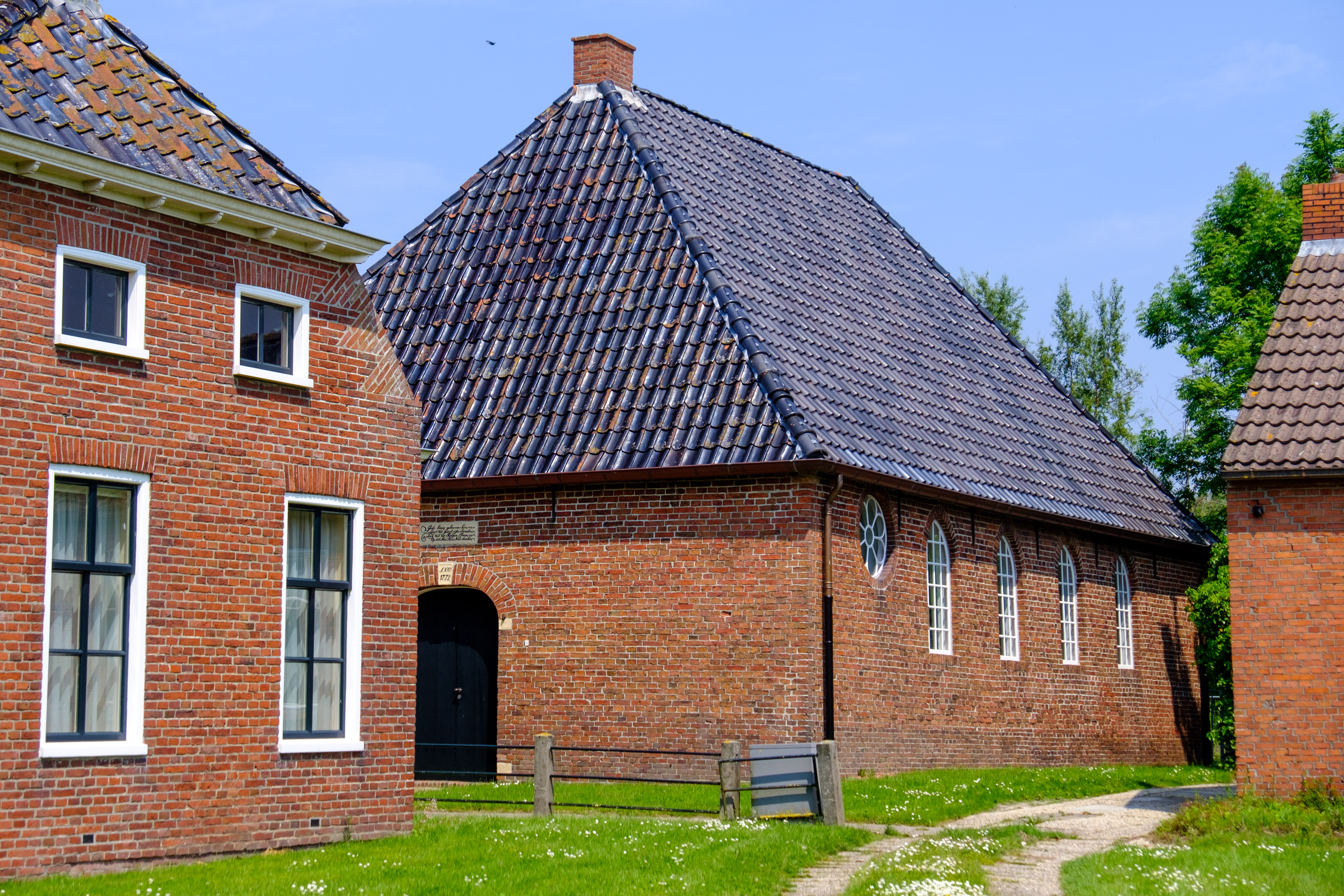
Mennonite church

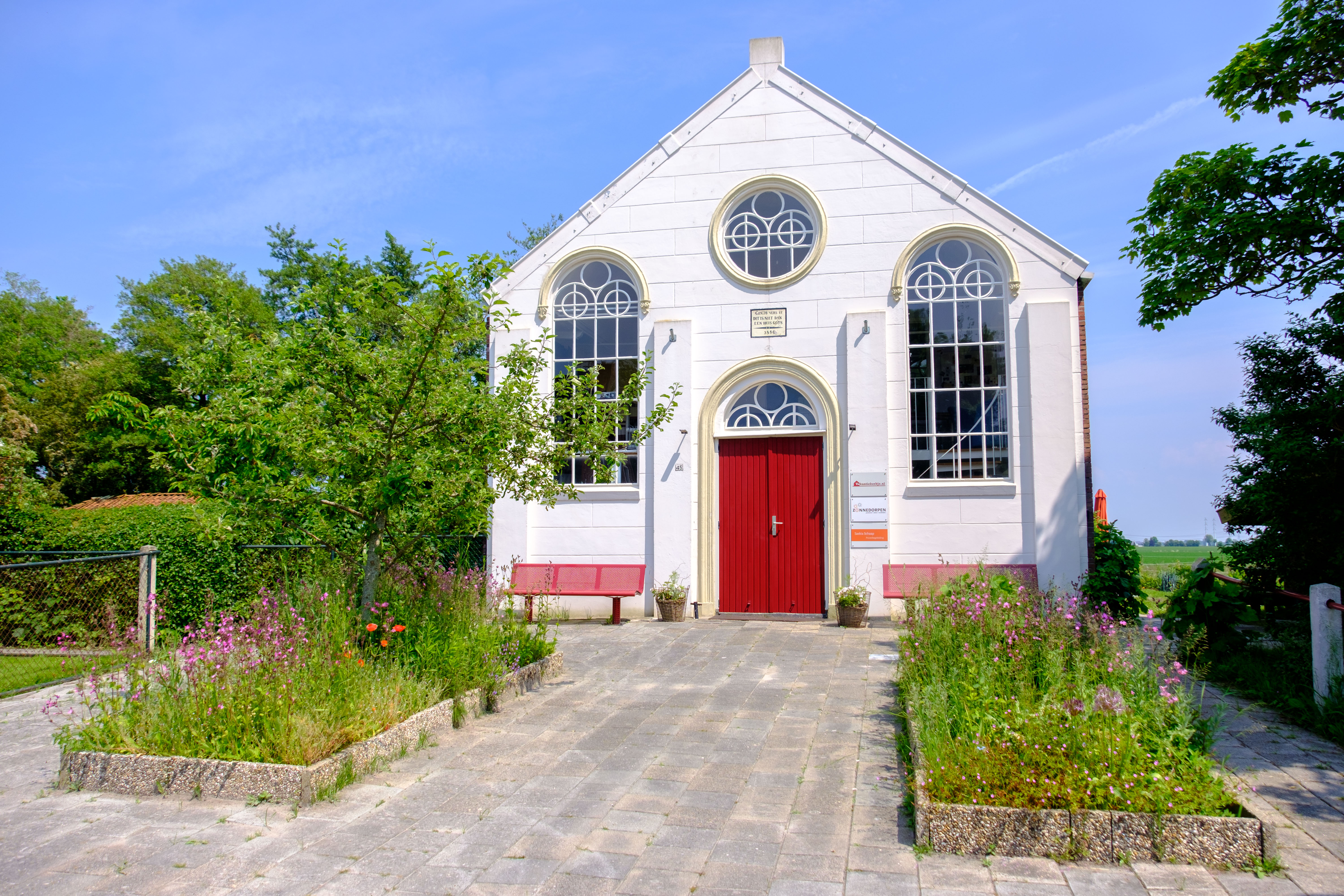
Former Reformed church
