= Fivelingo =

Historical region of the Netherlands

Coordinates: 53.2500°N 6.7500°E

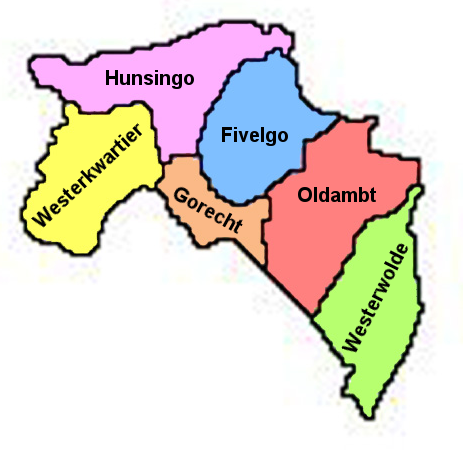
Map of Stad en Ommeland which now form the province of Groningen

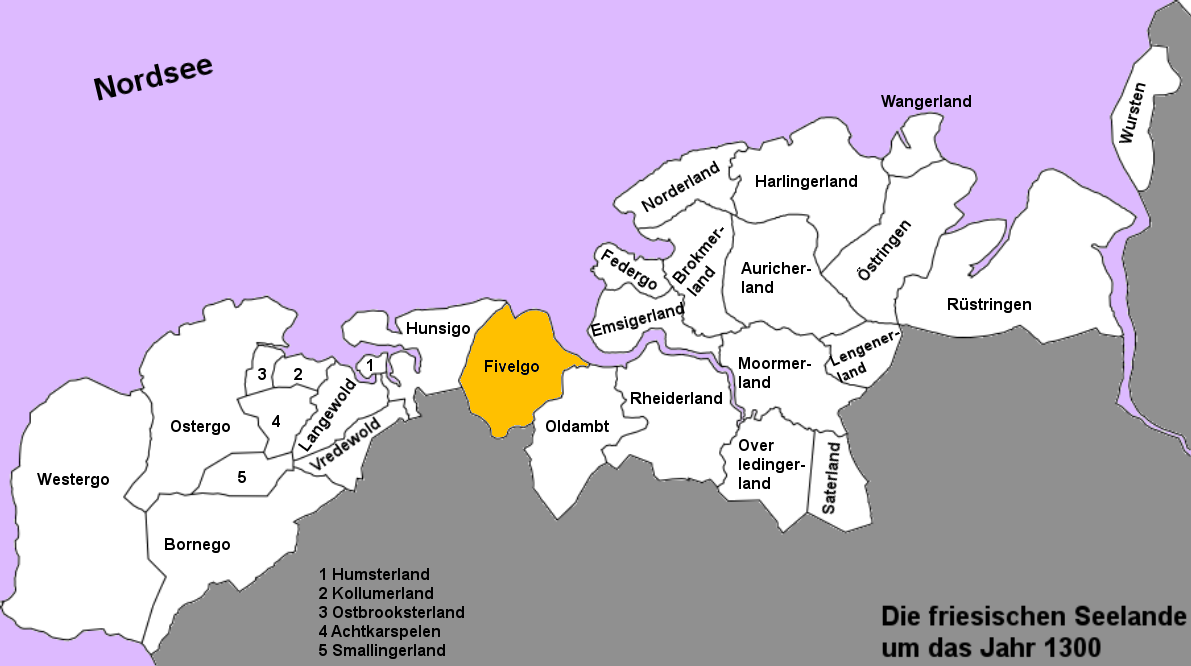
Fivelingo in c. 1300

Fivelingo or Fivelgo is a historical region and one of the Ommelanden (shires) in the province of Groningen. It was located southeast of Hunsingo, northeast of Gorecht, and northwest of Oldambt, and southwest of the Wadden Sea. Fivelingo was named after the historical river Fivel.
