= Garrelsweer =

- Village
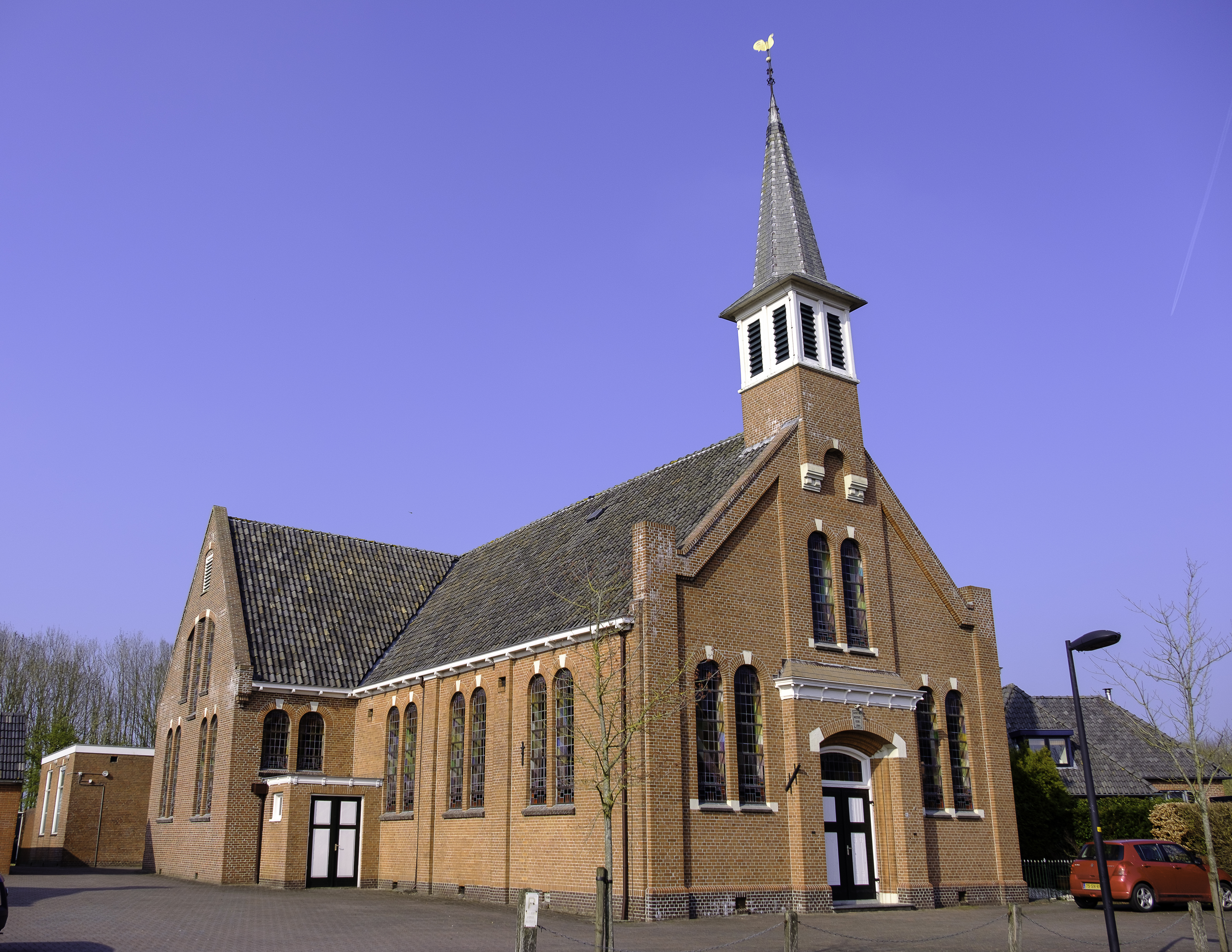
- Dutch Reformed church

- Flag

- Location in the province of Groningen in the Netherlands Garrelsweer (Netherlands)
- Coordinates: 53.31114°N 6.76907°E
- Country: Netherlands
- Province: Groningen
- Municipality: Eemsdelta

Area
  - Total: 0.26 km^{2} (0.10 sq mi)
- Elevation: 0.5 m (1.6 ft)

Population (2021)
  - Total: 450
  - Density: 1,700/km^{2} (4,500/sq mi)
- Time zone: UTC+1 (CET)
  - Summer (DST): UTC+2 (CEST)
- Postal code: 9936
- Dialing code: 0596

Garrelsweer (Dutch pronunciation: [ˈɣɑrəlsʋeːr]) is a village in the Dutch province of Groningen. It is a part of the municipality of Eemsdelta.

== History ==
The village was first mentioned in 1057 as Gerleuiswert, and means "settled height of Gerlef (person)". Garrelsweer developed on a dike along the Delf river. In 1057, it was given market, minting and toll rights by Henry IV, Holy Roman Emperor. During the Middle Ages, the village became overshadowed by neighbouring Loppersum. In 1424, the Delf was replaced by the Damsterdiep, a canal from Groningen to Delfzijl.

In 1568, during the Dutch Revolt, a battle was fought near Garrelsweer between Count Louis of Nassau and the Spanish Prince Charles de Ligne of Arenberg. The battle was undecided. Two days later, the fighting continued at Heiligerlee which became the first Dutch military victory, and therefore, the official beginning of the Eighty Years' War.

The Dutch Reformed church was built in 1912 as a replacement of the 13th century church. The church was sold in 2013, and is nowadays in use as a concert hall and exhibition centre. The polder mill Kloostermolen was constructed in 1877. It was decommissioned and fell into disrepair. In 2013, the forest near the wind mill was removed, and in 2014, it was restored and recommissioned.

Garrelsweer was home to 229 people in 1840. Garrelsweer used to part of the municipality of Loppersum. In 2020, it became part of Eemsdelta.

== Notable people ==
- Johannes de Groot (1914–1972), mathematician and topologist
- Rienk Kuiper (1886–1966), pastor and professor theology
- Laurens W. Molenkamp (born 1956), professor of physics, known for his work on semiconductor spintronics and topological insulators

== Gallery ==
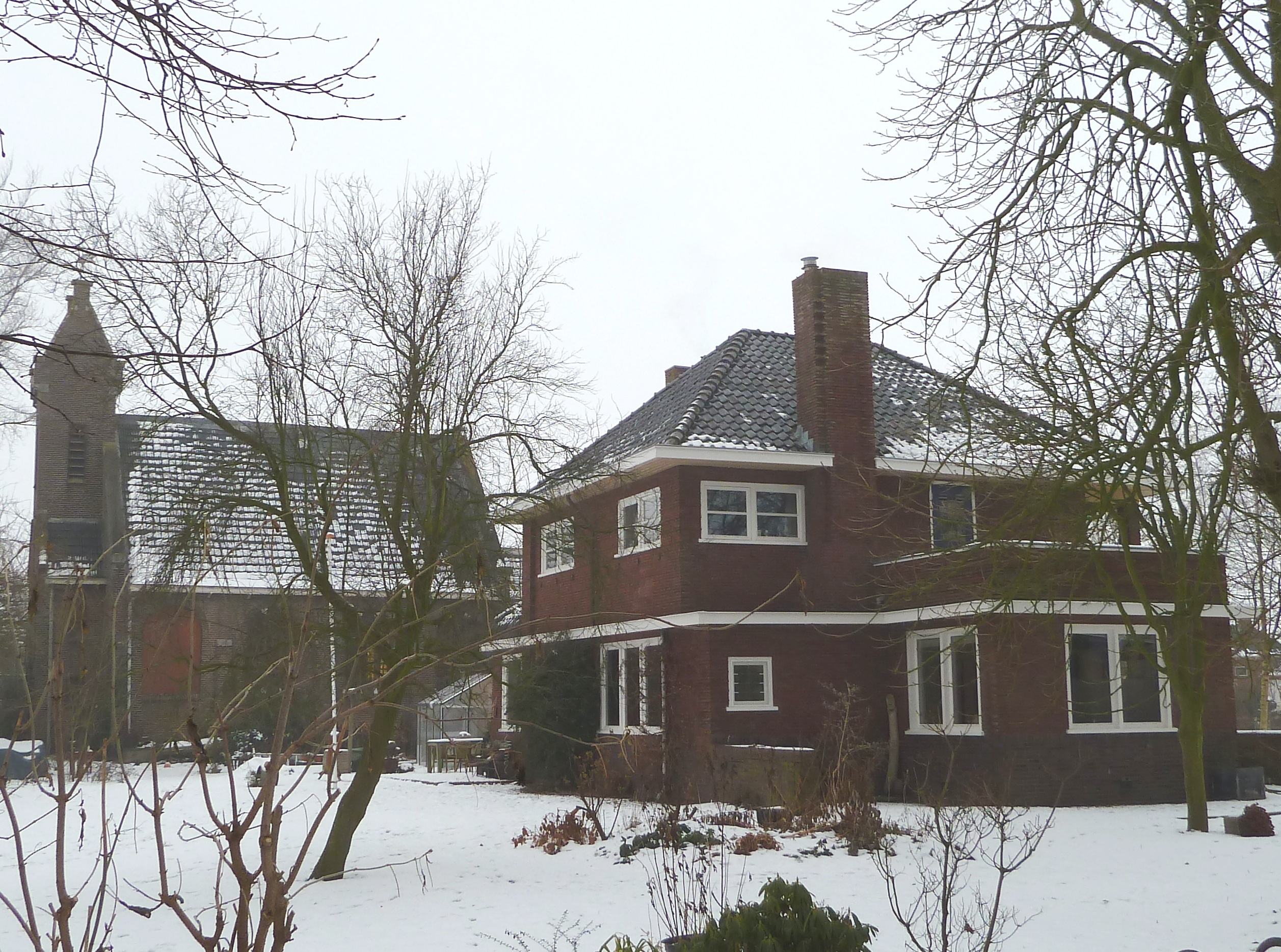
Clergy house in winter

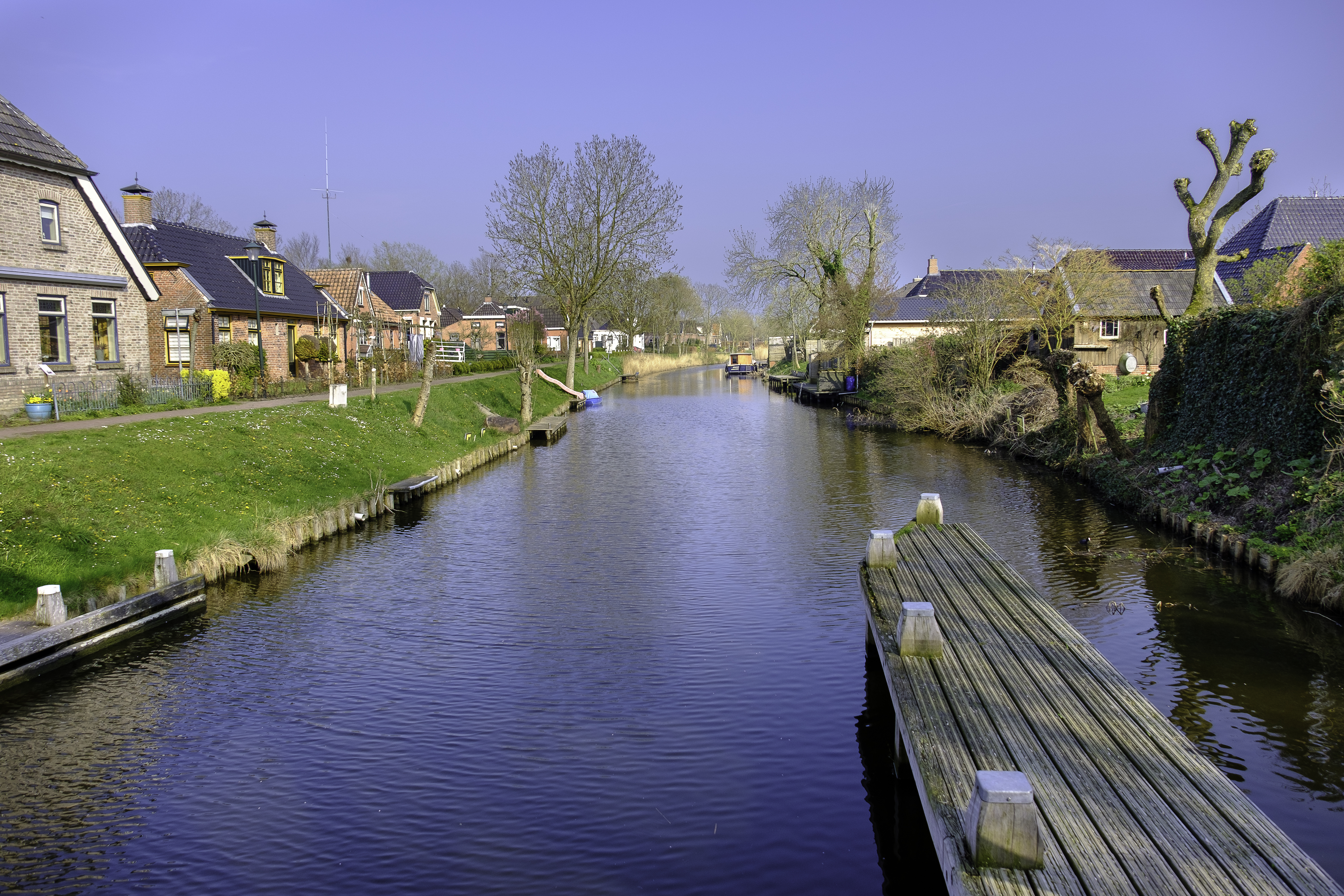
View on the Damsterdiep

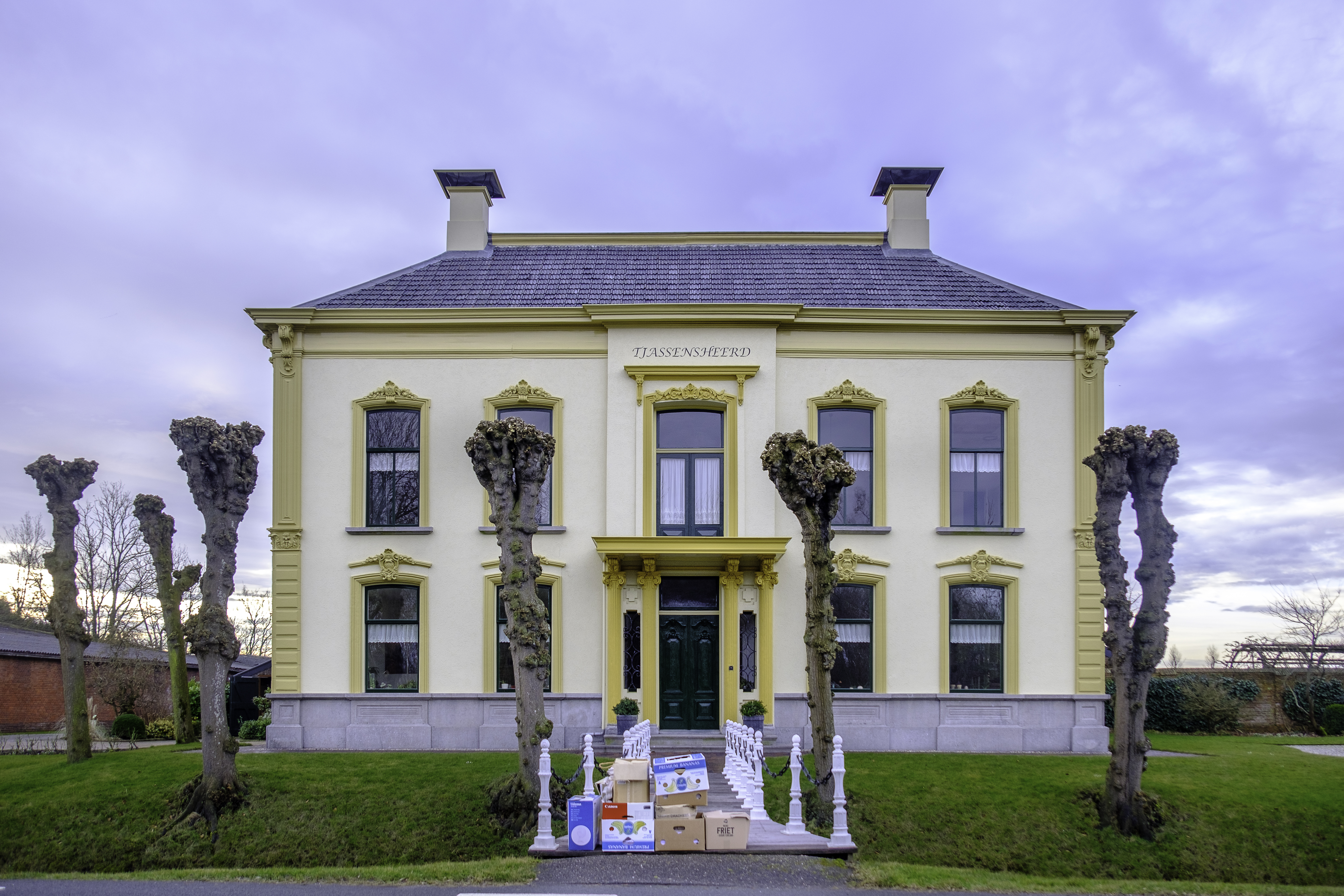
Villa Tjassensheerd

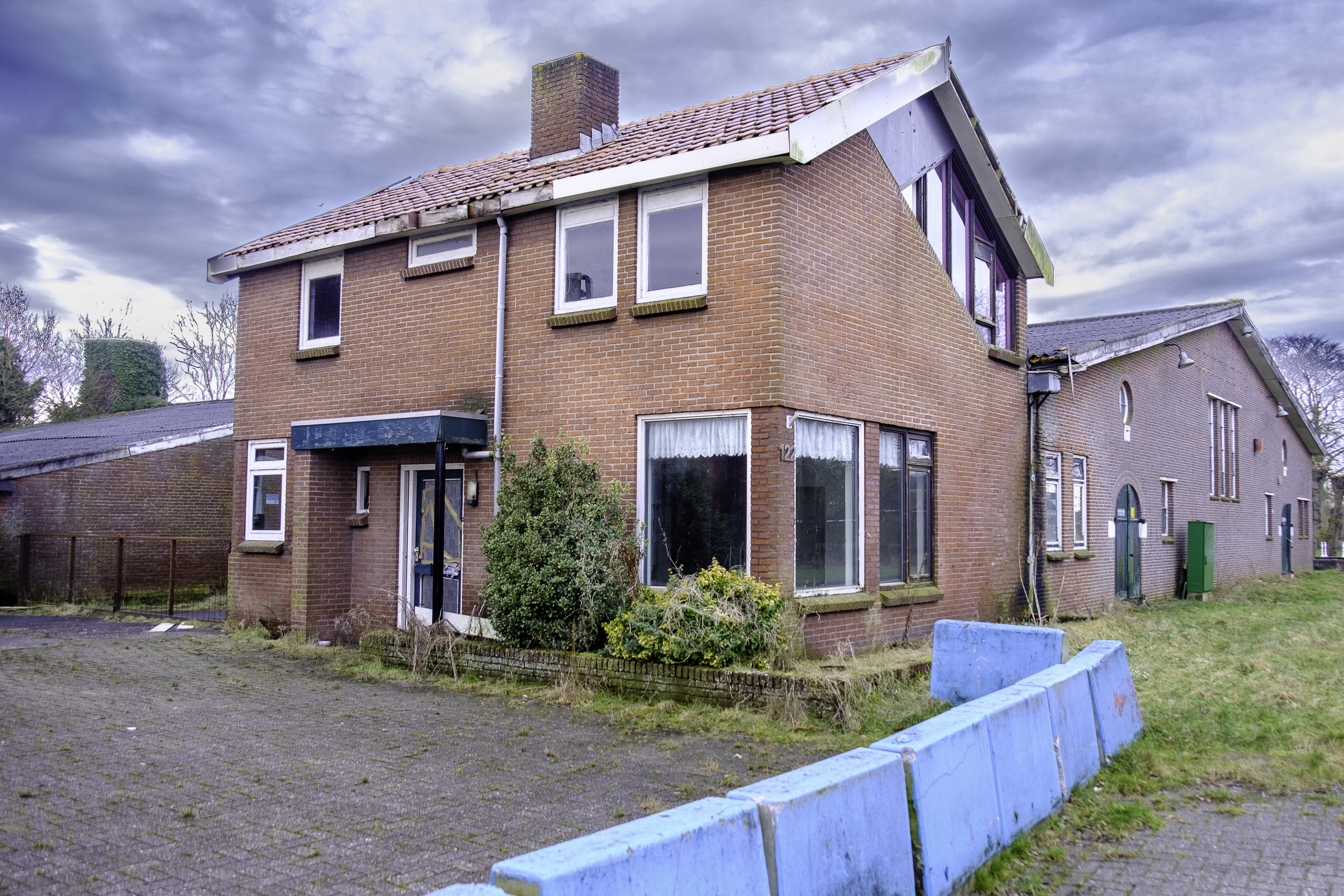
House in Garrelsweer
