= Godlinze =

- Village
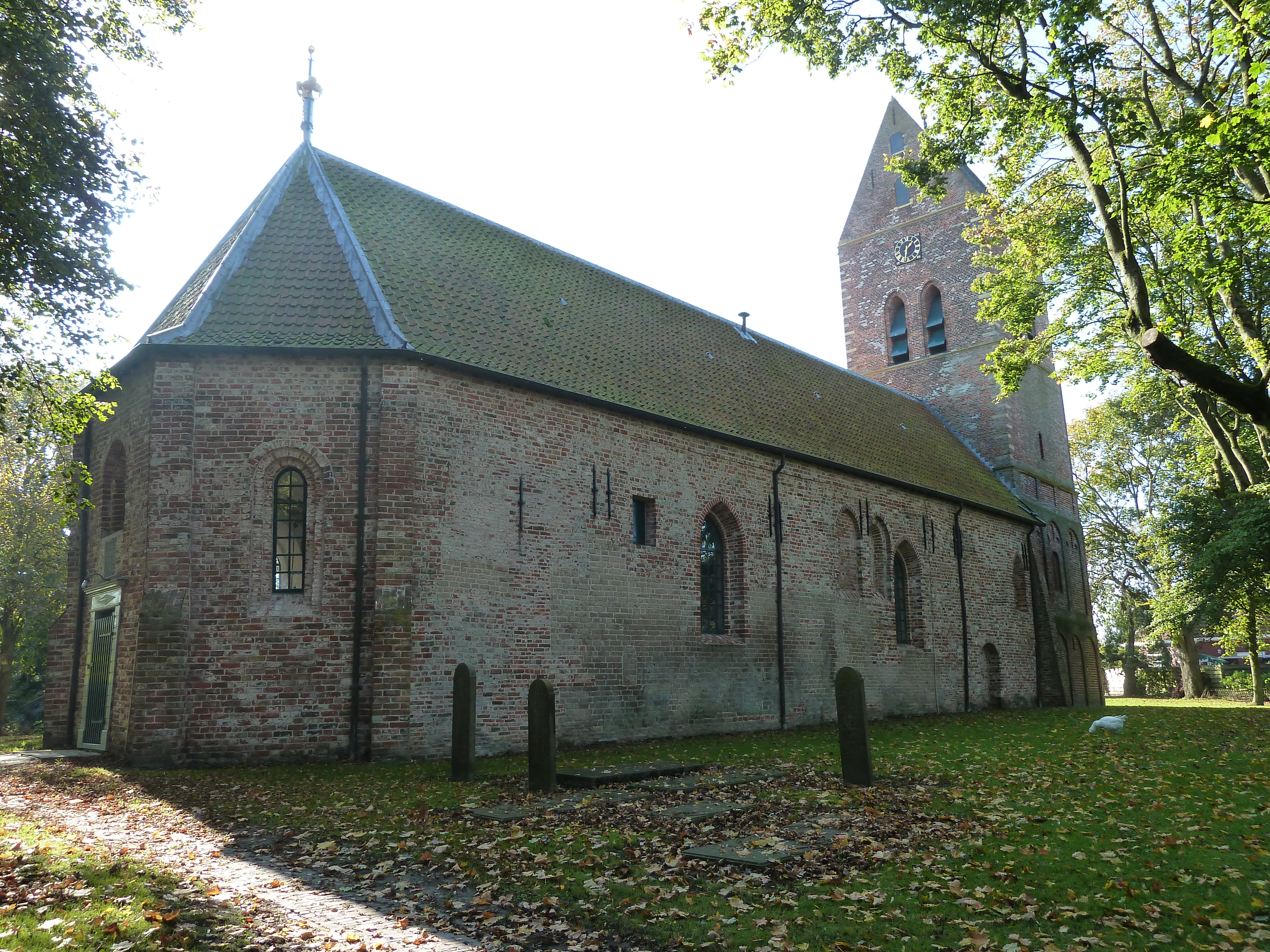
- St Pancras' Church in Godlinze

- Flag

- Location in the province of Groningen in the Netherlands Godlinze (Netherlands)
- Coordinates: 53°22′20″N 6°48′51″E
- Country: Netherlands
- Province: Groningen
- Municipality: Eemsdelta

Area
  - Total: 0.26 km^{2} (0.10 sq mi)
- Elevation: 3.8 m (12 ft)

Population (2021)
  - Total: 240
  - Density: 920/km^{2} (2,400/sq mi)
- Time zone: UTC+1 (CET)
  - Summer (DST): UTC+2 (CEST)
- Postal code: 9908
- Dialing code: 0596

Godlinze (Dutch pronunciation: [ɣɔdˈlɪnzə]; Gronings: Glìns [χɫɪ̃ːs]) is a village in the Dutch province of Groningen. It is a part of the municipality of Eemsdelta, and is located about 24 km northeast of Groningen.

== History ==
The village was first mentioned in the 10th or 11th century as Godleuingi, and means "settlement of the people of Godlef (person)". Godlinze is a terp (artificial living hill) village from the early middle ages with a radial structure. The terp is encircled by a canal, and the church is placed in the middle. The water from the canal came from a natural spring and was used for drinking water.

The tower of the Dutch Reformed church dates from the 12th century, but has been altered several times in its history. The church mainly dates from the 13th century.

Godlinze was home to 350 people in 1840.

== Gallery ==
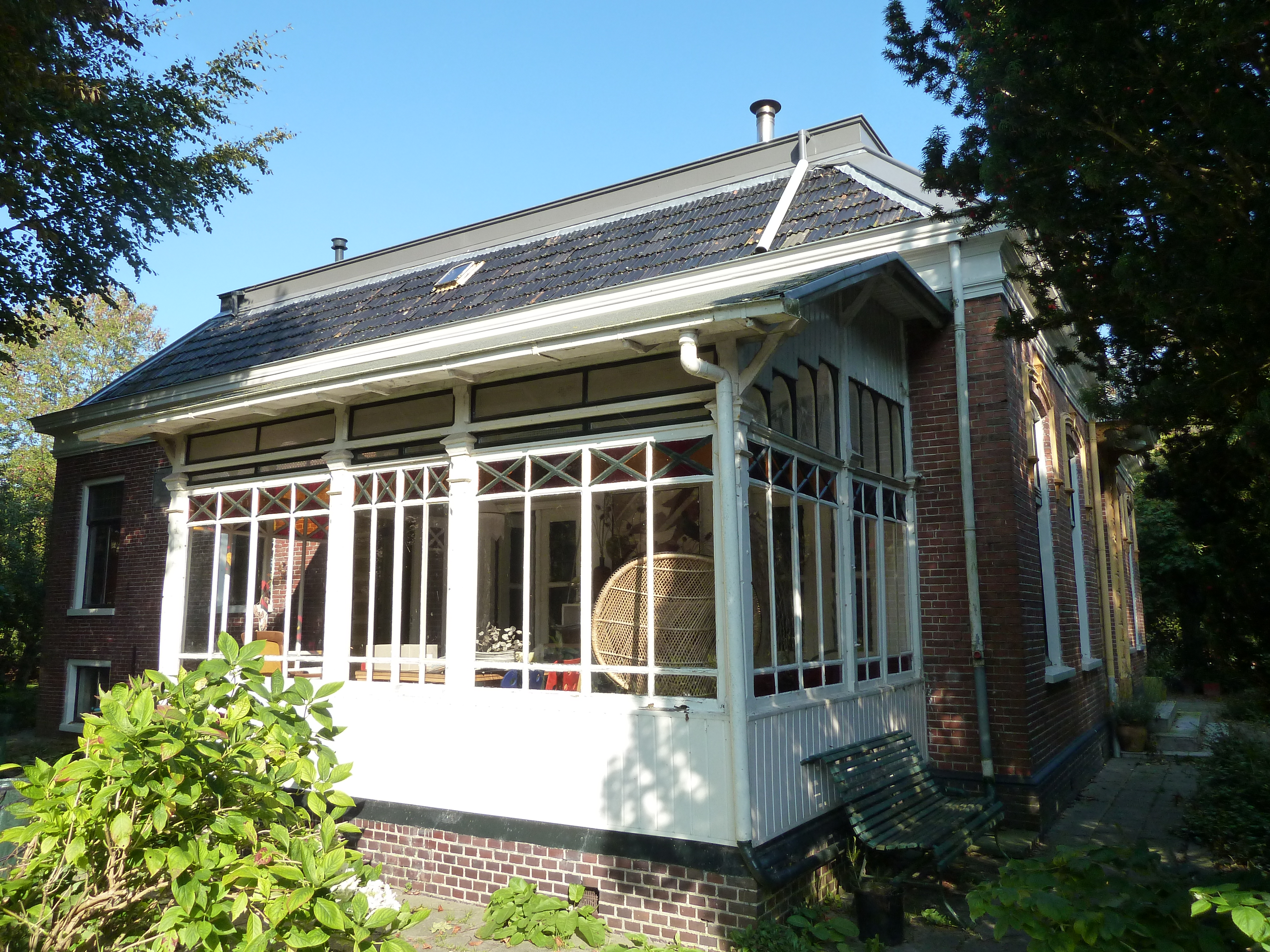
Sun room of the former clergy house

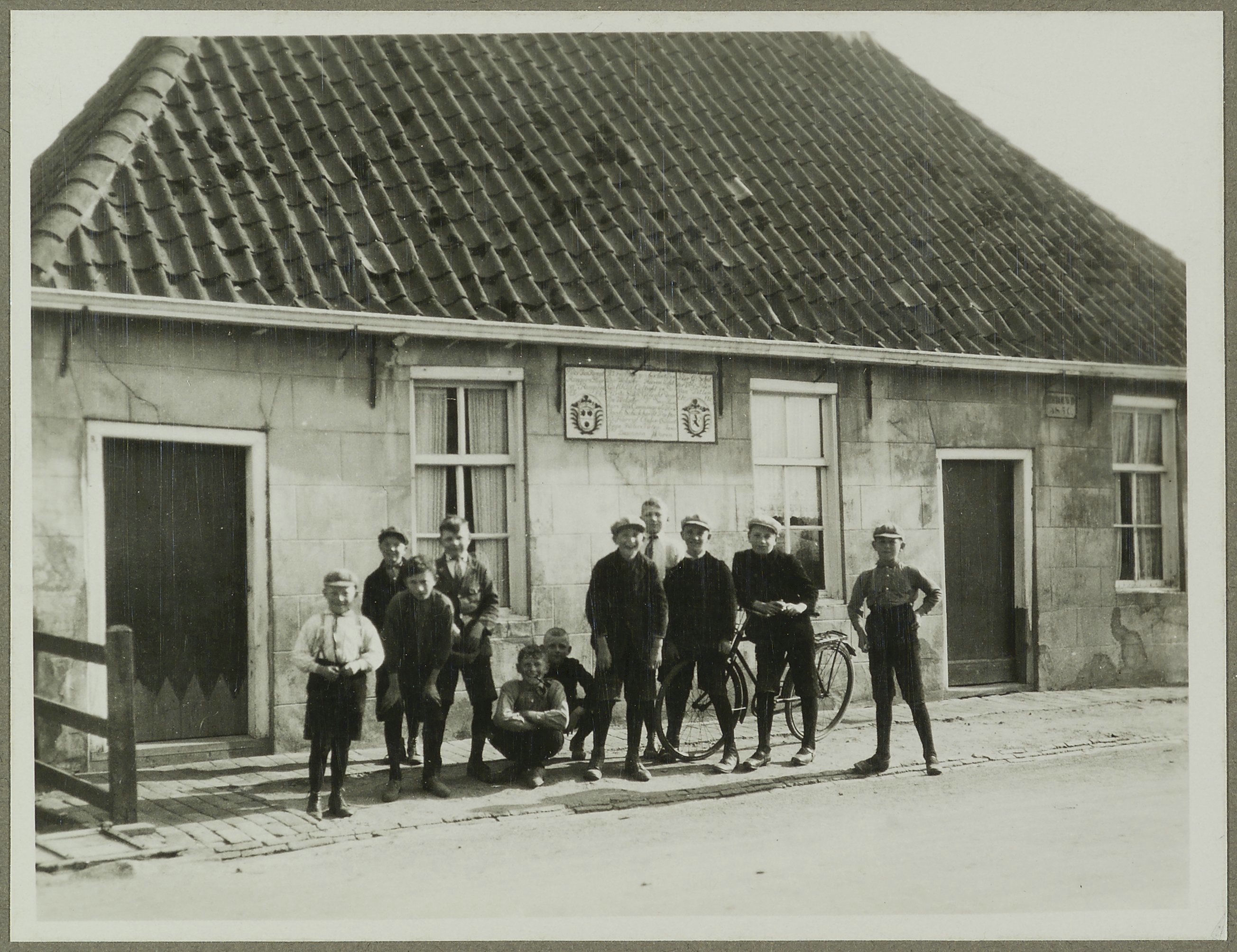
Local youth in front of a house (unknown date)

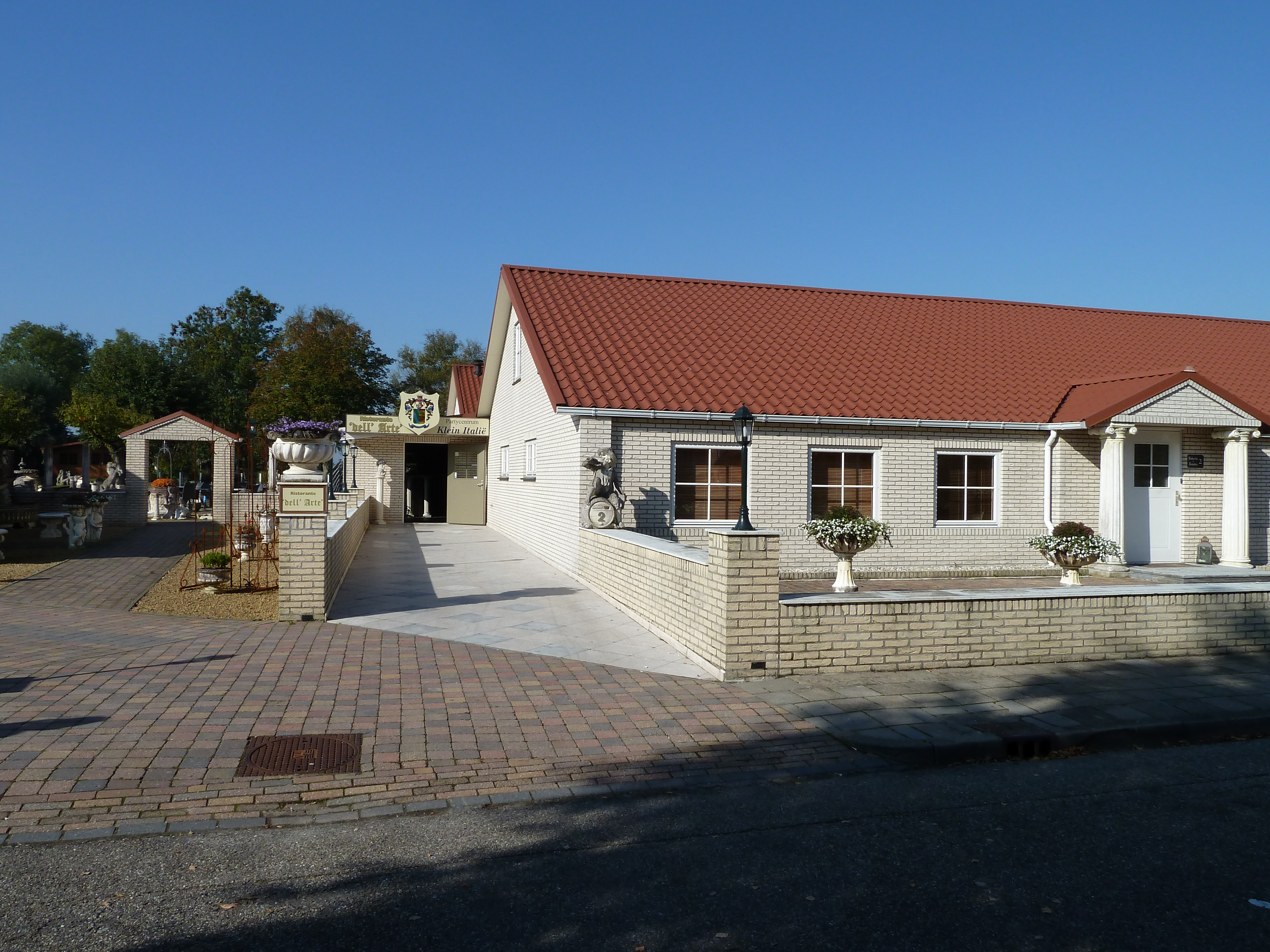
Villa Little Italy

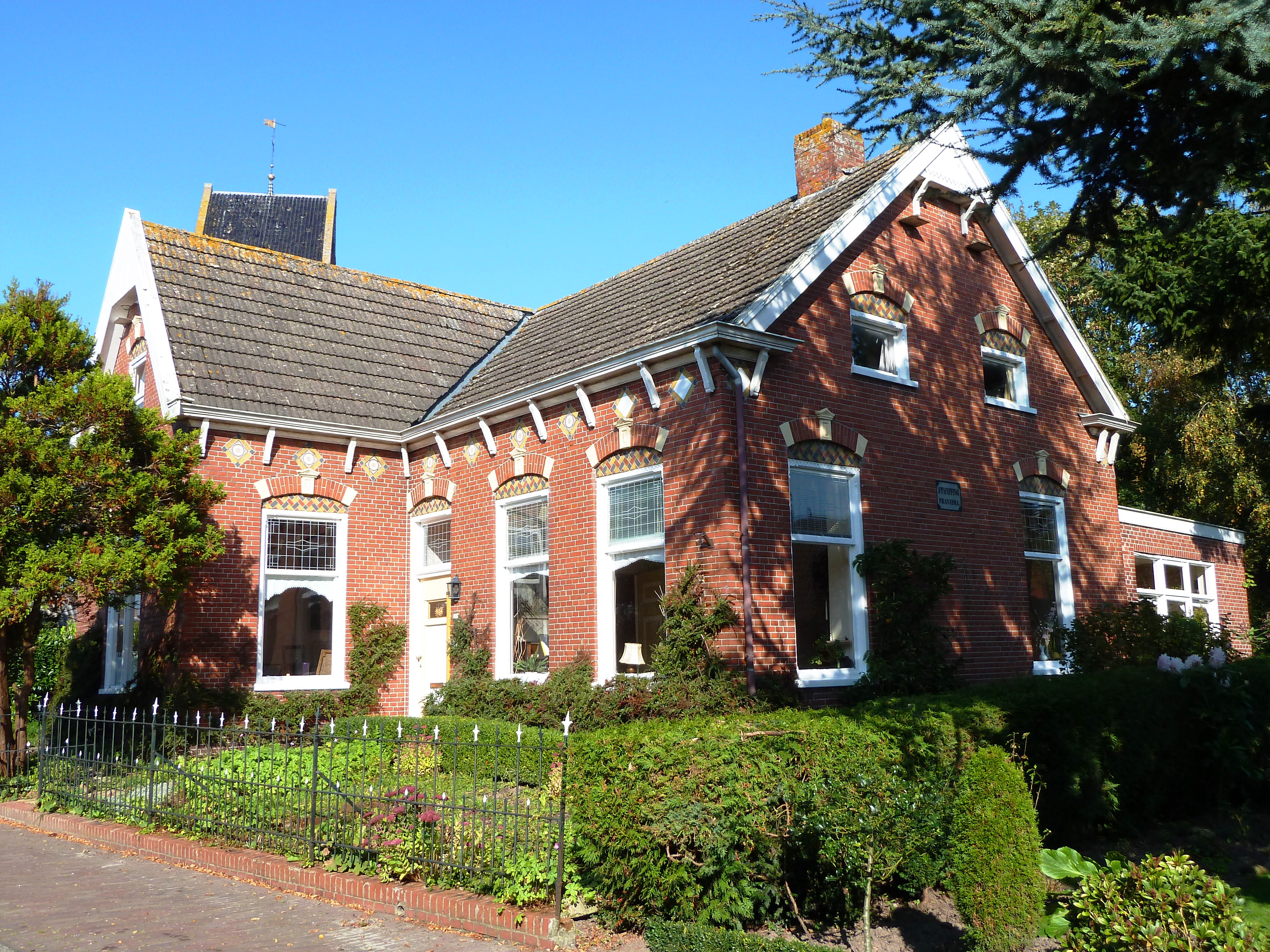
Schoolmasters house
