= Supercompact space =

Topological space where every open cover has a finite subcover

In mathematics, in the field of topology, a topological space is called supercompact if there is a subbasis such that every open cover of the topological space from elements of the subbasis has a subcover with at most two subbasis elements. Supercompactness and the related notion of superextension was introduced by J. de Groot in 1967.

== Examples ==
By the Alexander subbase theorem, every supercompact space is compact. Conversely, many (but not all) compact spaces are supercompact. The following are examples of supercompact spaces:

- Compact linearly ordered spaces with the order topology and all continuous images of such spaces
- Compact metrizable spaces (due originally to Strok & Szymański (1975), see also Mills (1979))
- A product of supercompact spaces is supercompact (like a similar statement about compactness, Tychonoff's theorem, it is equivalent to the axiom of choice.)

== Properties ==
Some compact Hausdorff spaces are not supercompact; such an example is given by the Stone–Čech compactification of the natural numbers (with the discrete topology).

A continuous image of a supercompact space need not be supercompact.

In a supercompact space (or any continuous image of one), the cluster point of any countable subset is the limit of a nontrivial convergent sequence.
