= Rodgau =

- Town
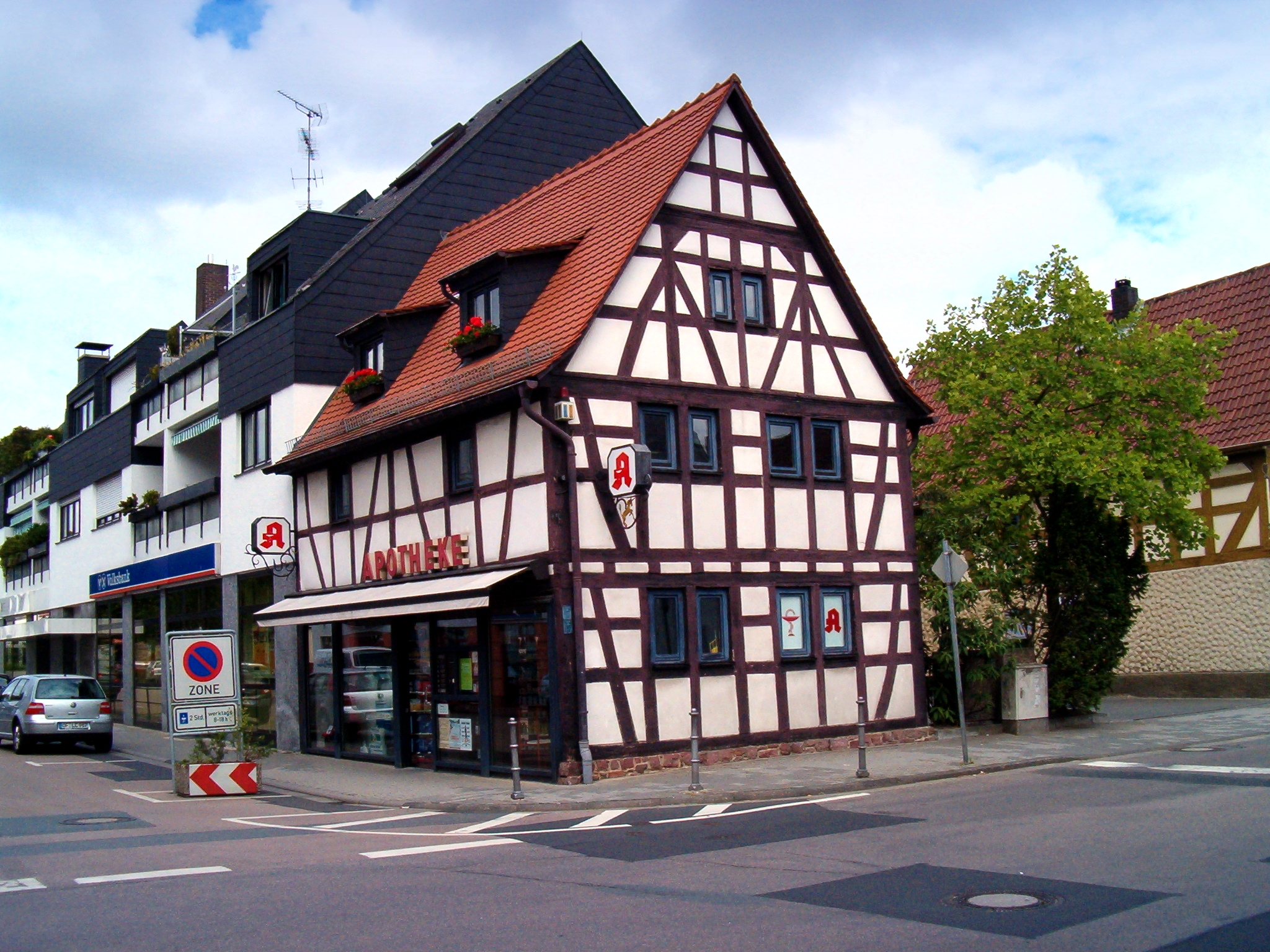

- Coat of arms

- Location of Rodgau within Offenbach district
- Interactive map of Rodgau
- Location within Germany Location within Hesse
- Coordinates: 50°01′N 8°53′E
- Country: Germany
- State: Hesse
- Admin. region: Darmstadt
- District: Offenbach

Government
  - Mayor (2021–27): Max Breitenbach

Area
  - Total: 65.04 km^{2} (25.11 sq mi)
- Elevation: 128 m (420 ft)

Population (2025-12-31)
  - Total: 45,197
  - Density: 694.9/km^{2} (1,800/sq mi)
- Time zone: UTC+01:00 (CET)
  - Summer (DST): UTC+02:00 (CEST)
- Postal codes: 63110
- Dialling codes: 06106
- Vehicle registration: OF
- Website: rodgau.de

Rodgau (German pronunciation: [ˈʁɔtɡaʊ]) is a town in the Offenbach district in the Regierungsbezirk of Darmstadt in Hesse, Germany. It lies southeast of Frankfurt am Main in the Frankfurt Rhine Main Region and has the greatest population of any municipality in the Offenbach district. It came into being in 1979 when the greater community of Greater Rodgau was raised to the status of a town, after having been formed through a merger of five formerly self-administering communities in the framework of municipal reform in Hesse in 1977. The current constituent communities’ history reaches back to the 8th century.

== Geography ==
=== Location ===
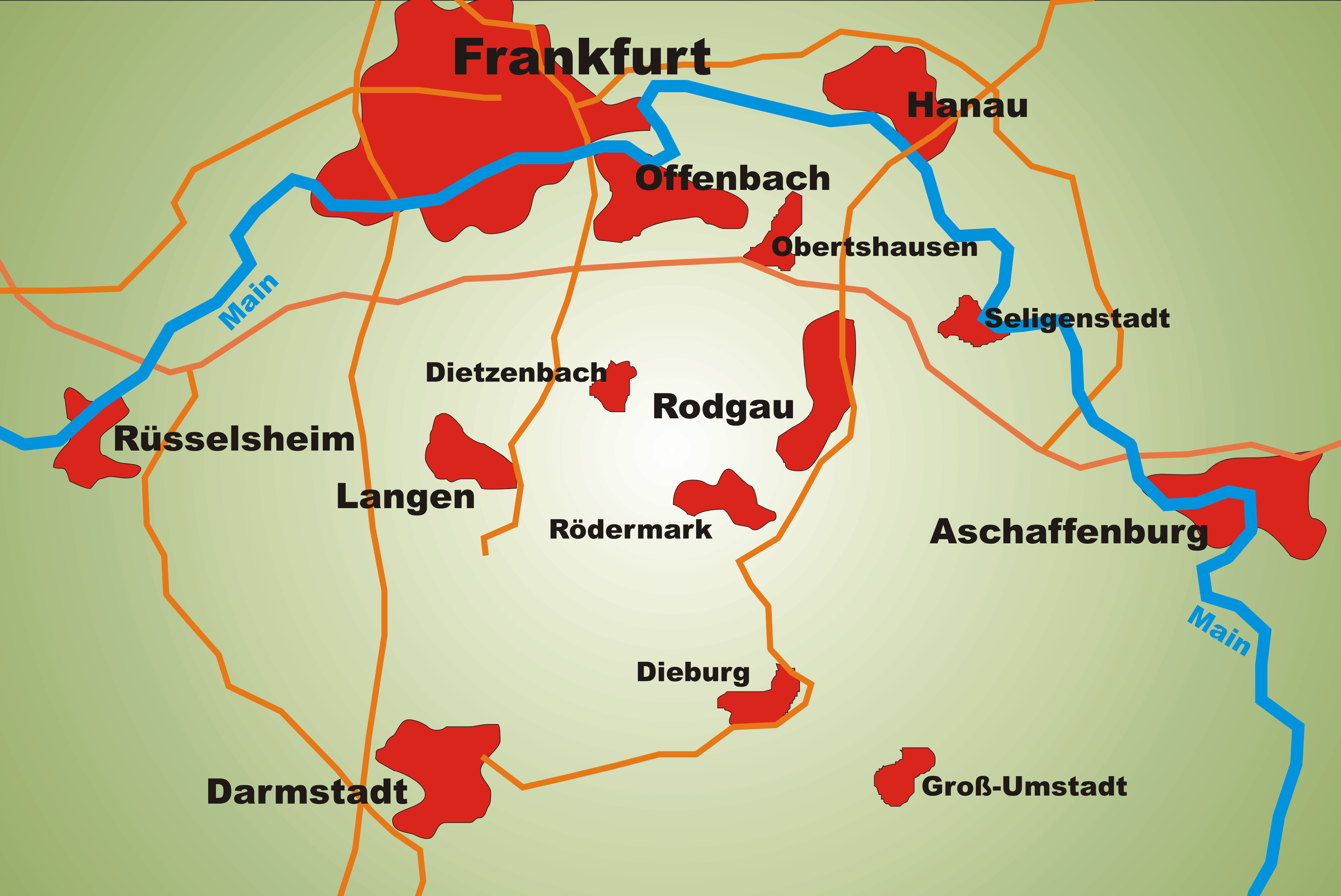
Rodgau's location in the Frankfurt Rhine Main Region

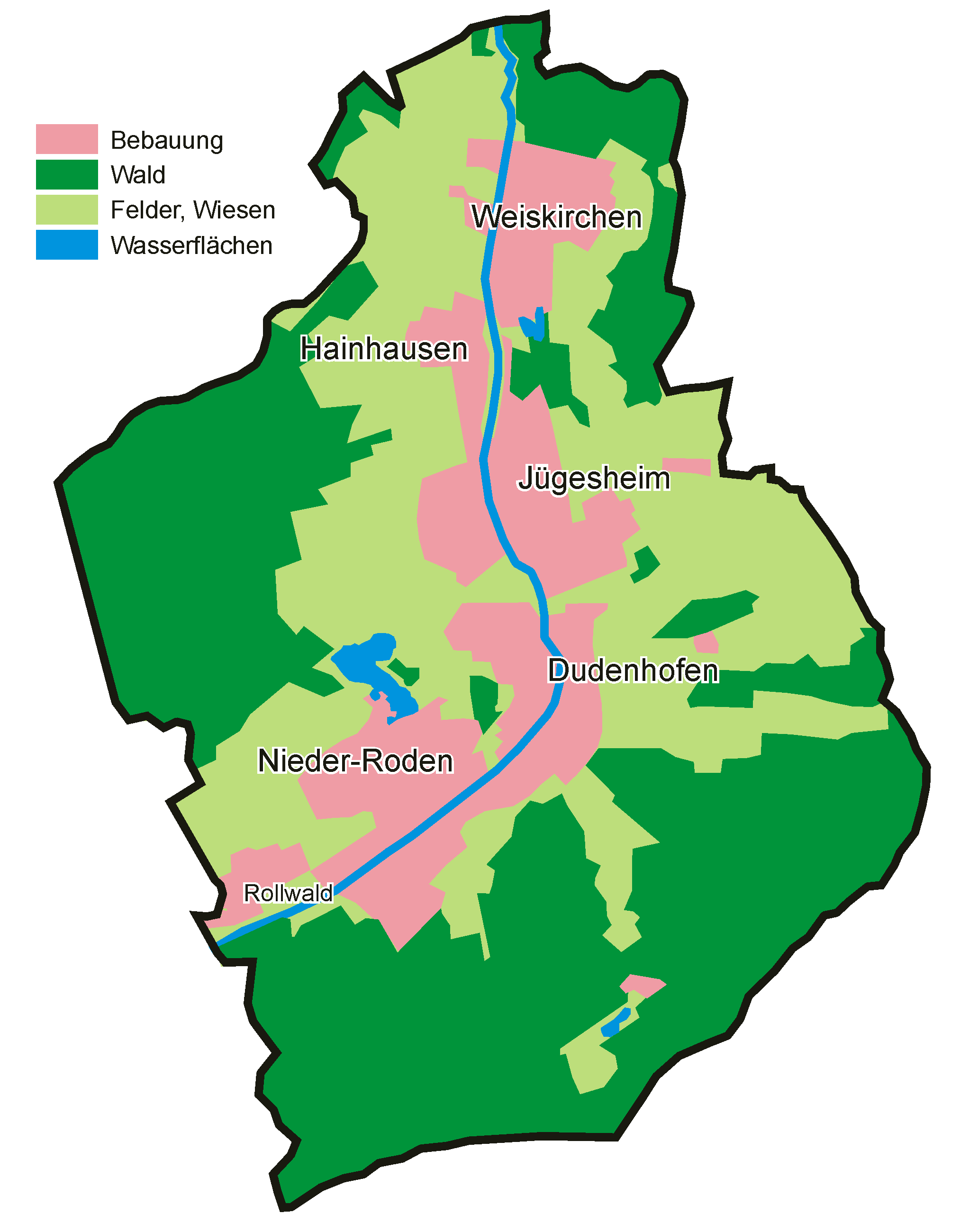
Rodgau's town limits and built-up area

Rodgau is part of the metropolitan area known as the Rhein-Main-Gebiet in German, one of Germany's economically strongest areas. The fiftieth parallel of north latitude (50°N) passes right through Puiseaux-Platz (square) in Nieder-Roden.

The town lies on the so-called Untermainebene, or Lower Main Plain, the northern outlying part of the Rhine rift. The flat land around Rodgau is set against hillier country in the nearby Spessart, Taunus, Vogelsberg, Odenwald and Bergstraße, which all serve as recreational areas for the people. The state boundary with neighbouring Bavaria runs only a few kilometres away, at the Main.

About a third of the municipal area is made up of woodland, and another third of land under agricultural use and of open water, while the remaining third is built up with residential and commercial areas and transport facilities. The brook, the Rodau, runs for 15 km through the whole municipal area.

Climatically the area is among Germany's mildest and least rainy areas (mean yearly measurements for 1982-2004: 10.5 °C, 639.1 mm).

=== Neighbouring communities ===
Rodgau borders in the north on the towns of Heusenstamm and Obertshausen, in the east on the community of Hainburg and the town of Seligenstadt, in the southeast on the town of Babenhausen and the community of Eppertshausen (both in Darmstadt-Dieburg), in the southwest on the town of Rödermark and in the west on the town of Dietzenbach.

=== Constituent communities ===
Rodgau's Stadtteile are Weiskirchen, Hainhausen, Jügesheim, Dudenhofen and Nieder-Roden with its own Ortsteil of Rollwald.

== History ==
=== Town’s founding ===
On 1 January 1977, in the course of municipal reform in Hesse, the greater community of Rodgau came into being as the communities of Weiskirchen, Hainhausen, Jügesheim, Dudenhofen and Nieder-Roden, along with the settlement of Rollwald belonging to Nieder-Roden were amalgamated. The greater community was granted town rights on 15 September 1979. The old cropfield name Rodgau, like Bachgau and Kinziggau belonging to the Maingau, gave the town its name. The original communities have been in existence for hundreds of years.

Today (as at 31 December 2007), Rodgau has 45,236 inhabitants (including 2,035 whose main residence is elsewhere), of whom 22,120 are male and 23,116 female. Foreigners from 52 different nations account for 4,471 inhabitants (9.9%). Those who have lived in Rodgau longer than ten years account for 64.6% of the population.

=== Weiskirchen ===
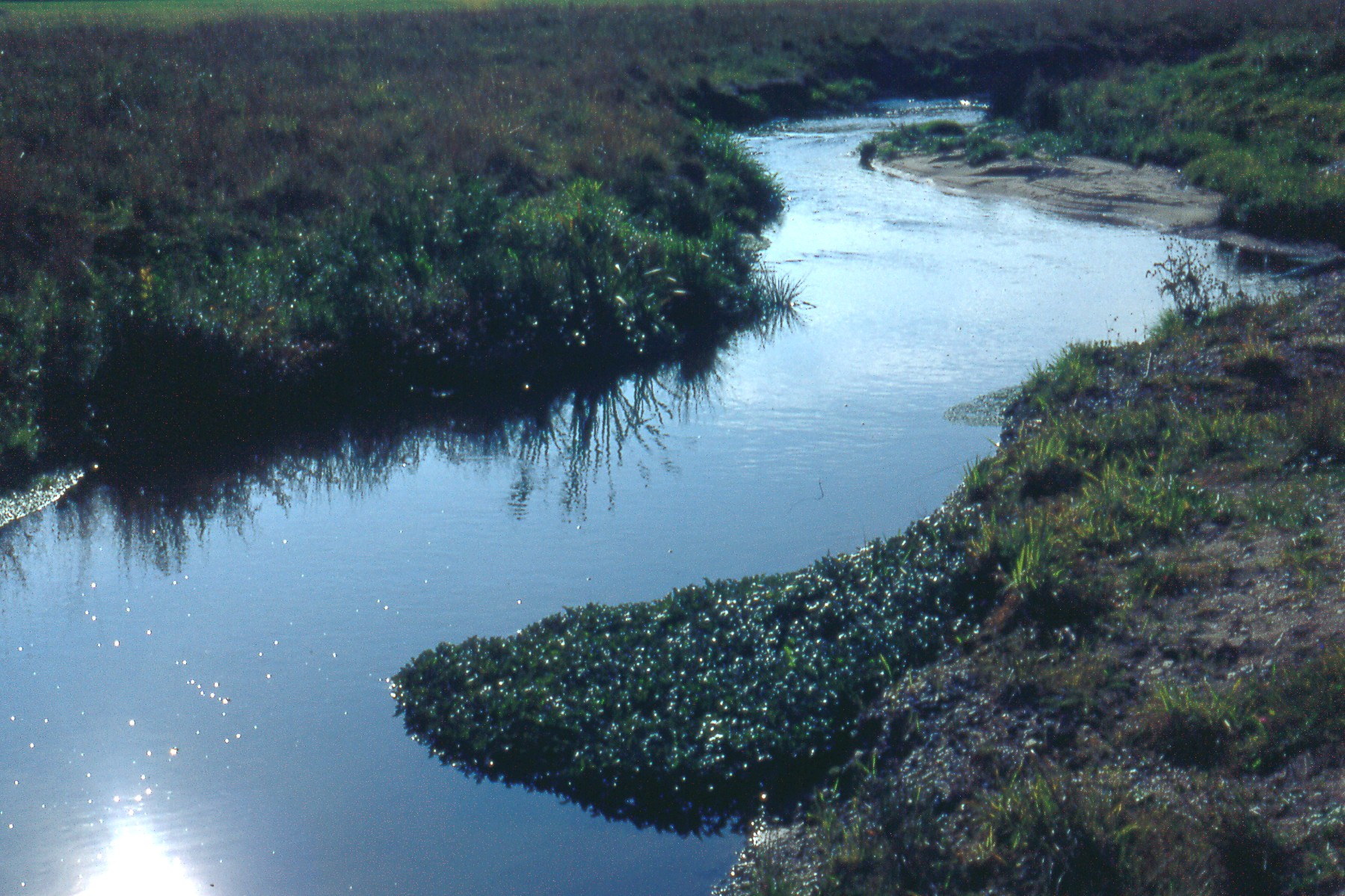
The Rodau on Weiskirchen's outskirts

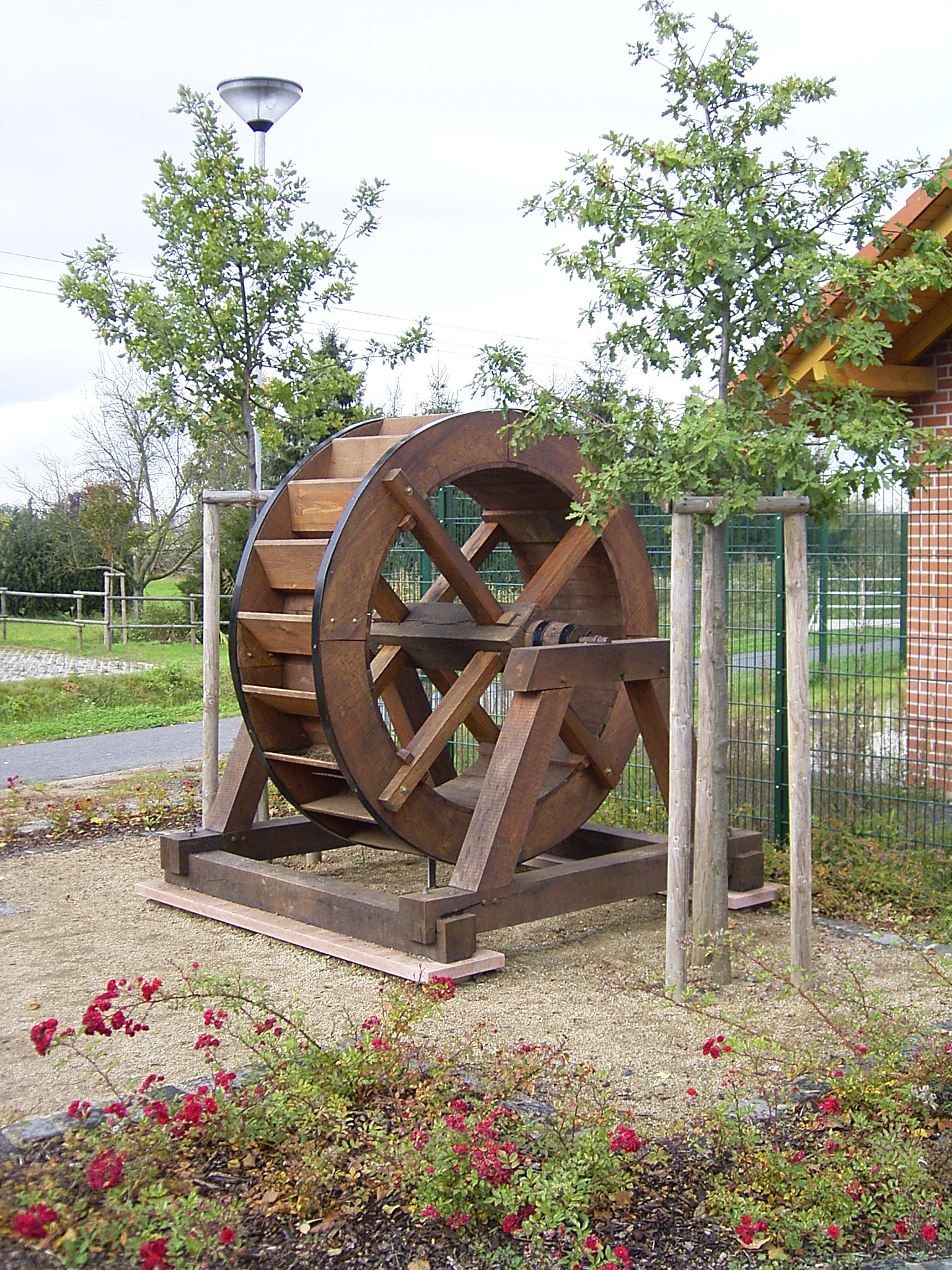
Waterwheel in Weiskirchen

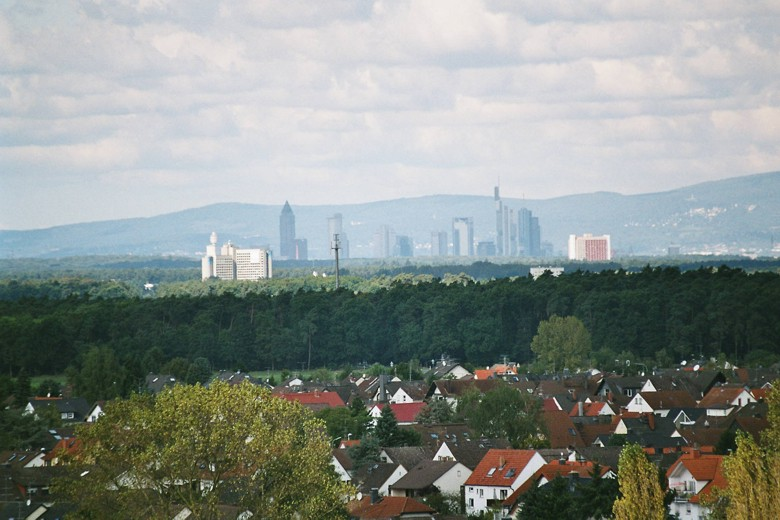
View from the watertower over Hainhausen towards Frankfurt

Around Saint Peter's Church (Peterskirche) arose the settlement of Wichenkirchen (or Wizzinkirchin) in Frankish times as a Thorpe (one-street village). It had its first documentary mention in 1287 in the Seligenstadt Monastery's accord with the Auheimer Mark. Weiskirchen was at this time Mother Church to the villages of Jügesheim, Hainhausen and Rembrücken. The first landlords, the Lords of Hagenhausen – later of Eppstein – sold the Amt of Steinheim in 1425 along with Weiskirchen, a village belonging to it, to the Archbishop and Elector of Mainz, to whom the village belonged until 1803. With this, Weiskirchen formed an ecclesiastical and economic hub in the Rodgau. When the Auheimer Mark (a communally held parcel of land to which belonged several villages) was divided up in 1786, Weiskirchen received a share of the forest.

After Secularization in 1803, the Amt of Steinheim along with Weiskirchen passed to Hesse. In 1896 the Rodgaubahn (railway) with a railway station in Weiskirchen opened.

In the course of the 19th century, Weiskirchen shifted from a farming village to a worker's community. Of the once well known village with its timber-frame houses very little is left. During National Socialist times, the small Jewish community was driven out. In March 2005, the small, restored former synagogue was ceremoniously reopened as a memorial. Since 1967, the Weiskirchen transmitter, a medium-wave transmitter owned by Hessischer Rundfunk, has been in operation on Weiskirchen's northwestern outskirts on a frequency of 594 kHz although this has now been dismantled.

==== Population development ====
In 1576, Weiskirchen had 37 households. In 1681, 111 inhabitants lived in 26 households. In 1834, 655 people lived in the village. A century later, in 1939, that figure had risen to 1,740. By 1970, the population had risen to 4,840 inhabitants. In late 2007, the constituent community had 6,115 inhabitants.

=== Hainhausen ===
As early as 1108, Rodgau's smallest constituent community (with a population today of roughly 3,800) had a documentary mention as the location of a moated castle belonging to the Lords of Hagenhausen, in which it was named as Haginhusen. Remains of this castle still lie under a meadow near the Rodau on today's Burgstraße (road). The Hagenhausen noble family, who after moving to the Taunus began styling themselves the Lords of Eppstein, and writing many a page in mediaeval German history, found themselves holding great importance and power from the 13th century onwards. Four Archbishops of Mainz alone were installed by the Eppsteins. Hainhausen, though, did not benefit from the former lords’ descendants’ lordliness. In 1425, the Lords of Eppstein sold the Amt of Steinheim along with Hainhausen to the Archbishop and Elector of Mainz. Its low point came, as it did for all the surrounding villages too, in the Thirty Years' War, at which time the Plague also raged among the population. The survivors besought the patron saint of Plague sufferers, Saint Roch for help. The end of the deadly epidemic is still celebrated today every year on 16 August with a procession, whose destination was originally the Rochus-Kapelle (“Saint Roch’s Chapel”), consecrated in 1692. Nowadays, though, the newer Rochus-Kirche (“Saint Roch’s Church”), standing at a different site in the heart of the community, serves as the procession's endpoint, and has since the late 19th century. Saint Roch's Church houses as an art history treasure a pietà from the mid 14th century which depicts in sculpture Mary and Jesus after he has been taken down from the Cross. After Secularization in 1803, Hainhausen passed to Hesse.

==== Population development ====
In 1681, 101 inhabitants lived in 18 households. In 1834, there were 341 inhabitants in Hainhausen. In 1939, this had risen to 835 inhabitants. In 1970, Hainhausen had 2,051 inhabitants. In late 2007 the constituent community had 3,820 inhabitants.

=== Jügesheim ===
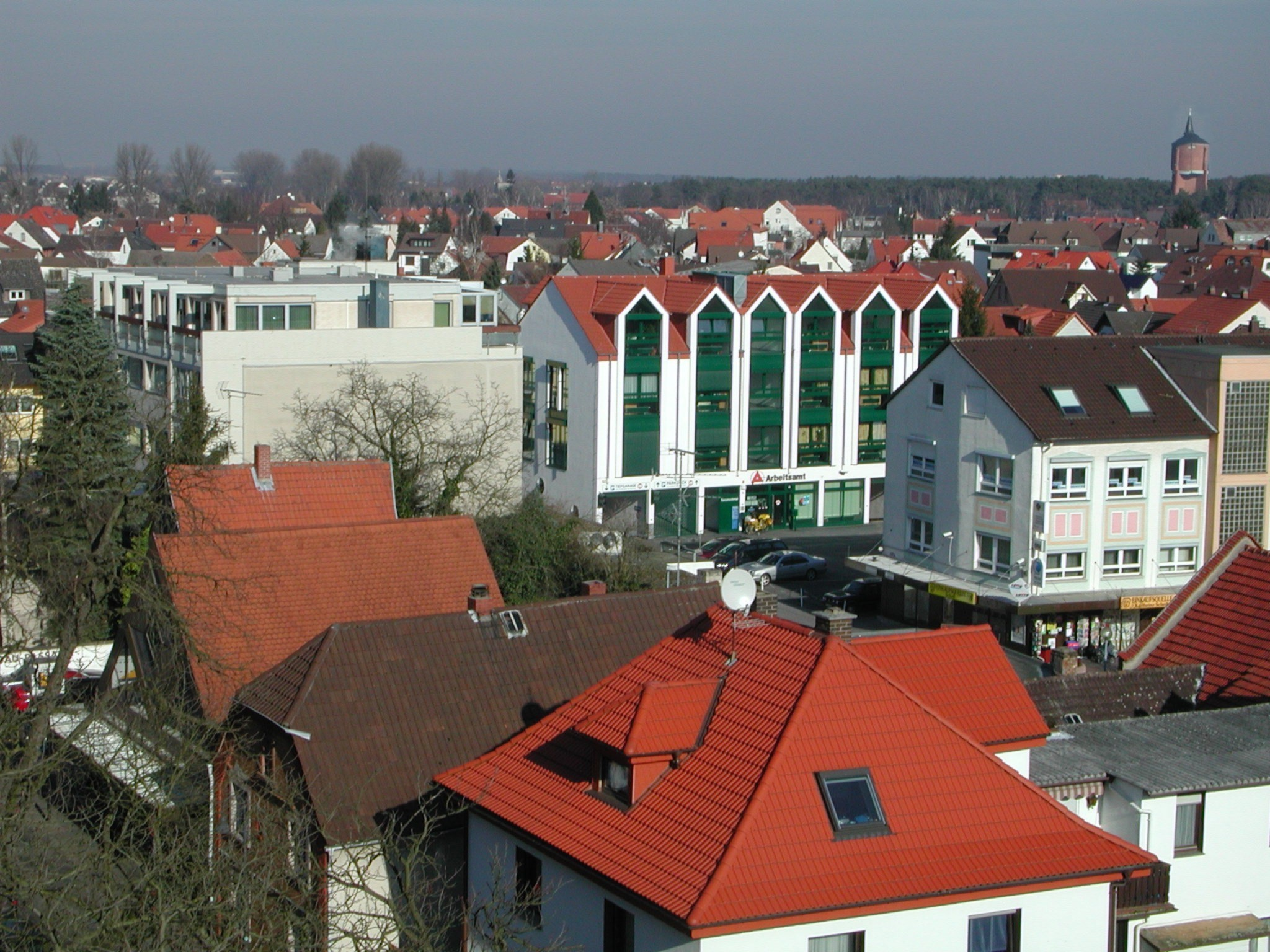
View of Jügesheim with watertower

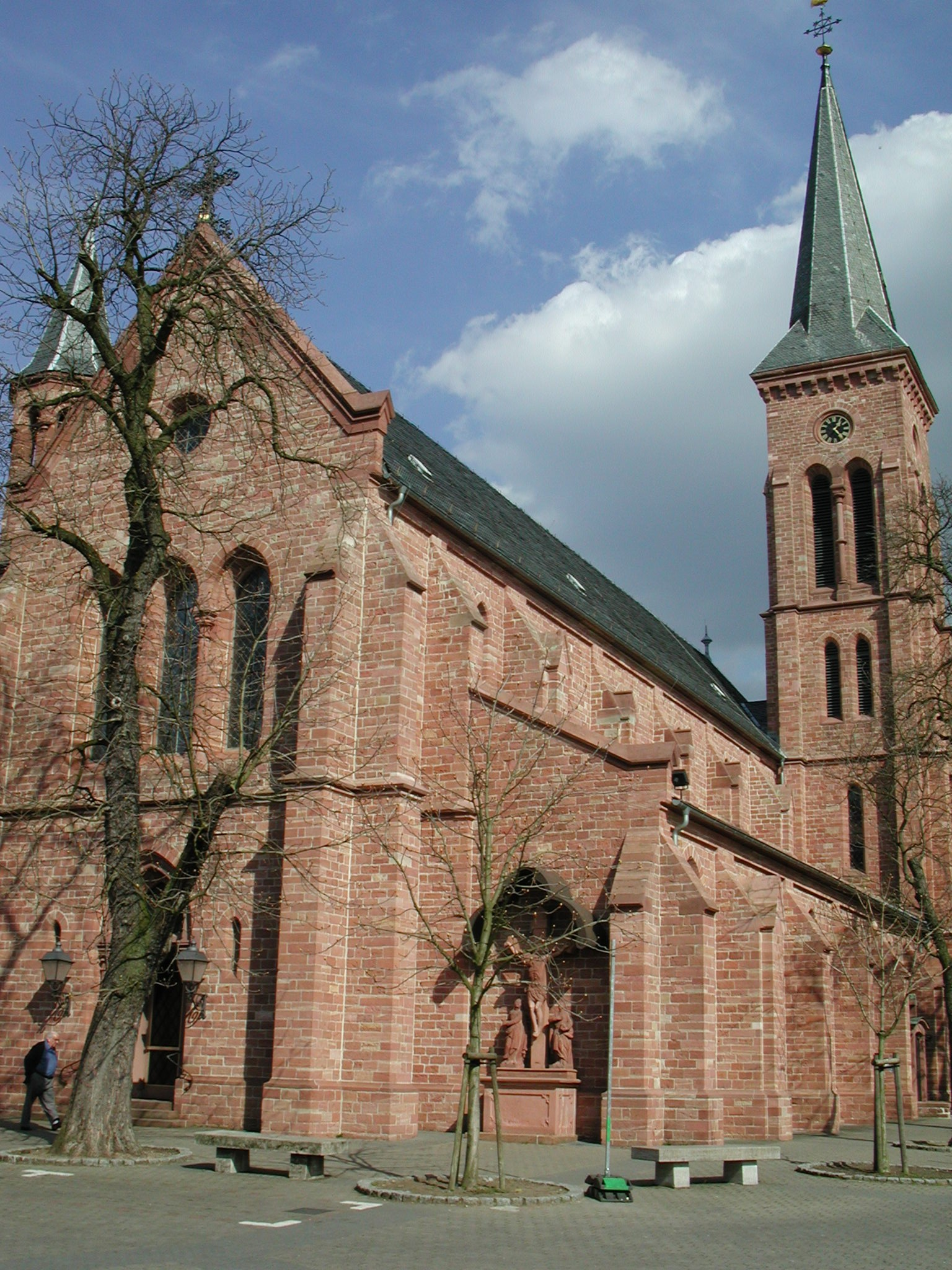
St. Nikolaus in Jügesheim

Founded as a clump village, today's constituent community had its first documentary mention in 1261 under the name Guginsheim. One of Charlemagne’s Vögte (singular: Vogt) named Gugin or Guginhart was supposedly the namesake. Other forms of the name used over the course of the Middle Ages were Gugesheym, Gogeßheym, Goginsheym, and Gugesheim. In the local speech, Jügesheim is sometimes still called Giesem today. Jügesheim was founded in Frankish times, or more particularly in Merovingian times (between 481 and 560). Near the old Roman roads in the Maingau woods, which crossed near Jügesheim, the Franks built new military colonies to control the land.

In the Middle Ages, the surrounding woodlands belonged to the Wildbann Dreieich, a royal hunting forest, one of whose 30 Wildhuben (special estates whose owners were charged with guarding the hunting forest) was maintained in Jügesheim. In 1425, the Lords of Eppstein sold the Amt of Steinheim along with Jügesheim to the Archbishop and Elector of Mainz.

The Thirty Years' War took a heavy toll on the community, which at that time was part of the Rödermark (communal lands). The place only recovered in the 17th century. In the 20th century it established a leather industry with many workers working leather at home. Besides this there were of course many farming households. After Secularization in 1803, Jügesheim passed to Hesse. In 1896 the Rodgaubahn (railway) with a railway station in Jügesheim opened.

In the mid-1970s, a commercial area was laid out, which over the years that followed further grew. The new Town Hall made Jügesheim into a centre of Rodgau. Today Rodgau's second biggest constituent community has some 11,700 inhabitants.

North of the constituent community between Hainhausen and Jügesheim is found the 43.5 m-tall watertower built in the years from 1936 to 1938. It was in use until 1979, and is now under monumental protection. It has become a kind of landmark for Jügesheim, and indeed for all Rodgau.

==== Population development ====
In 1576 Jügesheim had 36 households. In 1681, 121 persons lived in only 26 households. In 1834, the village had 1,071 inhabitants. In the 20th century this rose to 3,174 in 1939, and to 7,673 in 1970. In late 2007 the constituent community had 11,855 inhabitants.

=== Dudenhofen ===
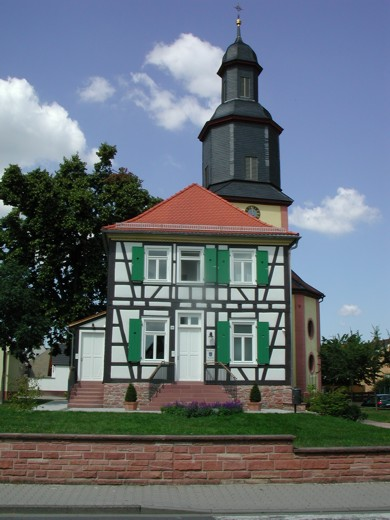
Dudenhofen: Rodgau town registry office and Evangelical church

Dudenhofen was founded in the second wave of Frankish settlement, after the time of the partition of the empire in 561. The place was founded at a newly built road junction in an expanded road network, at the expense of the former hub at Jügesheim. The placename relates to a personal name Tuoto or Dodo.

Dudenhofen had its first documentary mention in 1278 in an accord from Archbishop Werner von Eppstein of Mainz with the Lords of Eppstein. The village long belonged to various owners at the same time (the Lords of Falkenstein, Hanau, Isenburg and Electoral Mainz), the odd part was bequeathed, others were traded or mortgaged (complete with inhabitants). Between 1450 and 1736, Dudenhofen belonged to the County of Hanau-Lichtenberg and was assigned to the Amt of Babenhausen, thereby making the place as of 1550 an Evangelical enclave surrounded by Catholic neighbours. The Counts of Hanau-Lichtenberg died out in 1736, whereupon Hesse-Darmstadt and Hesse-Kassel found themselves at odds over the village. In 1771, Dudenhofen was annexed by the County of Hesse-Kassel. Above the main entrance to the Baroque Evangelical church is therefore found Hesse-Kassel's coat of arms. Underneath the arms is the inscription Was unter Hessens Lust Erbprinz Wilhelm gebaut, sei Dir, o wahrer Gott, zur Pflege nun vertraut (“That built under Hesse’s desire Hereditary Prince William, be it trusted unto Thee, O true God, for its care”). Meant here is William IX.

In 1807, the Amt of Babenhausen along with Dudenhofen passed to French administration. In 1811, Dudenhofen was absorbed into the Grand Duchy of Hesse. In 1896 the Rodgaubahn (railway) with a railway station in Dudenhofen opened.

In the 18th and 19th centuries, many young men emigrated to the Americas to seek their fortune. Today, agriculture, except for asparagus growing, plays no further rôle.

==== Population development ====
In the Thirty Years' War, the village's population suffered great losses. In 1622 alone, 155 of the 430 inhabitants lost their lives. In 1631 the Plague claimed 104 victims. Only 26 inhabitants lived to see the war end.

In 1681, Dudenhofen had 38 households and 139 inhabitants. In 1834 there were 1,139 people in the village, almost all Evangelical but for one long established Jewish family, the Reinhardt family, that was driven out of the village in 1938 shortly after Kristallnacht. In 1939 there were 2,120 inhabitants and in 1970, 4,628. In late 2007 the constituent community had 7,967 inhabitants.

=== Nieder-Roden ===
The centre that is now Rodgau's biggest constituent community had its first documentary mention as early as 786 when the Rotaha Monastery was bequeathed to the Lorsch Abbey. The name might go back to the Siedlung auf einer gerodeten Aue (“Settlement on a cleared floodplain”), but it is also likely that it comes from the Rodau, which runs through the community, and which rises in Rotliegend near Urberach. During floods, it was once known to run red (rot in German). Whereabouts the monastery lay is to this day unknown. Finds, however, confirm that people were settling in what is now Nieder-Roden long before the Christian Era. In the Middle Ages, the surrounding woodlands belonged to the Wildbann Dreieich, a royal hunting forest, one of whose 30 Wildhuben (special estates whose owners were charged with guarding the hunting forest) was maintained in Nieder-Roden.

Nieder-Roden had another documentary mention in 791 when the Frankish nobleman Erlulf donated all his holdings in Nieder-Roden (rotahen inferiore), Ober-Roden (rotahen superiore) and Bieber to the Lorsch Abbey. In 1346 the village became an independent parish, although in the years that followed it still remained in a certain dependency relationship with its former mother parish of Ober-Roden.

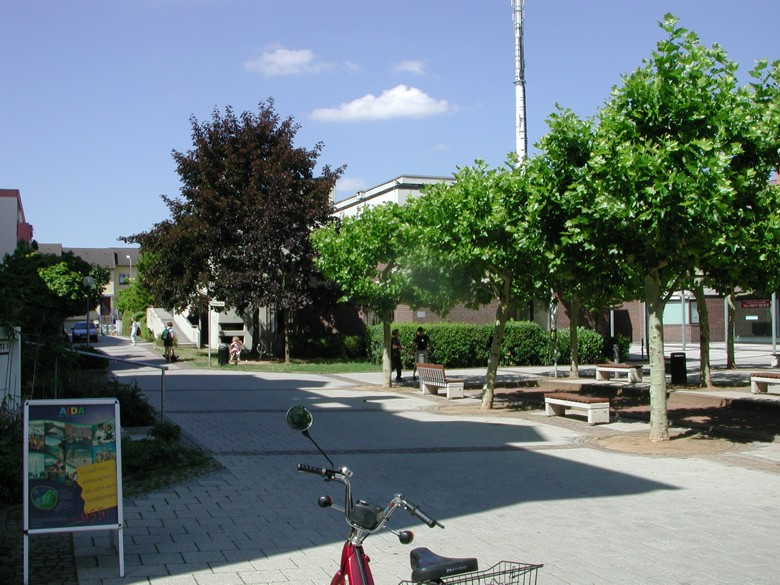
Boules and chess under planetrees in Nieder-Roden

Formerly an Eppstein holding, the place belonged from 1425 to 1803 to the Archbishopric of Mainz and enjoyed great importance as the centre of a tithing area and the seat of a tithe court. In 1803, the village, as part of the Amtsvogtei of Dieburg, ended up with the Landgraviate of Hesse-Darmstadt, the later Grand Duchy of Hesse. When the Rödermark (a communally held parcel of land to which belonged several villages) was divided up in 1818, Nieder-Roden received a share of the forest. In 1832, Nieder-Roden passed to the Offenbach district. From 1874 to 1977, the community was in the Dieburg district. In 1896 the Rodgaubahn (railway) with a railway station in Nieder-Roden opened.

In the Second World War, during the National Socialist régime, there arose a penal and prison camp, the Lager Rollwald (“Rollwald Camp”) on the land now occupied by the Rollwald community.

After the war, Nieder-Roden grew, especially in the 1960s and 1970s from 2,500 inhabitants to now almost 16,000. In the course of district reform in Hesse in 1977, the community was transferred from the Dieburg district to the Offenbach district, to which the town of Rodgau also belongs.

==== Population development ====
In 1576 there were 66 households. In 1681, 117 people lived in only 29 households. In 1829 Nieder-Roden had 787 inhabitants. In 1939, this had risen to 3,616 and by 1970 the number had reached 11,033. In late 2007 the constituent community had 15,479 inhabitants.

== Politics ==
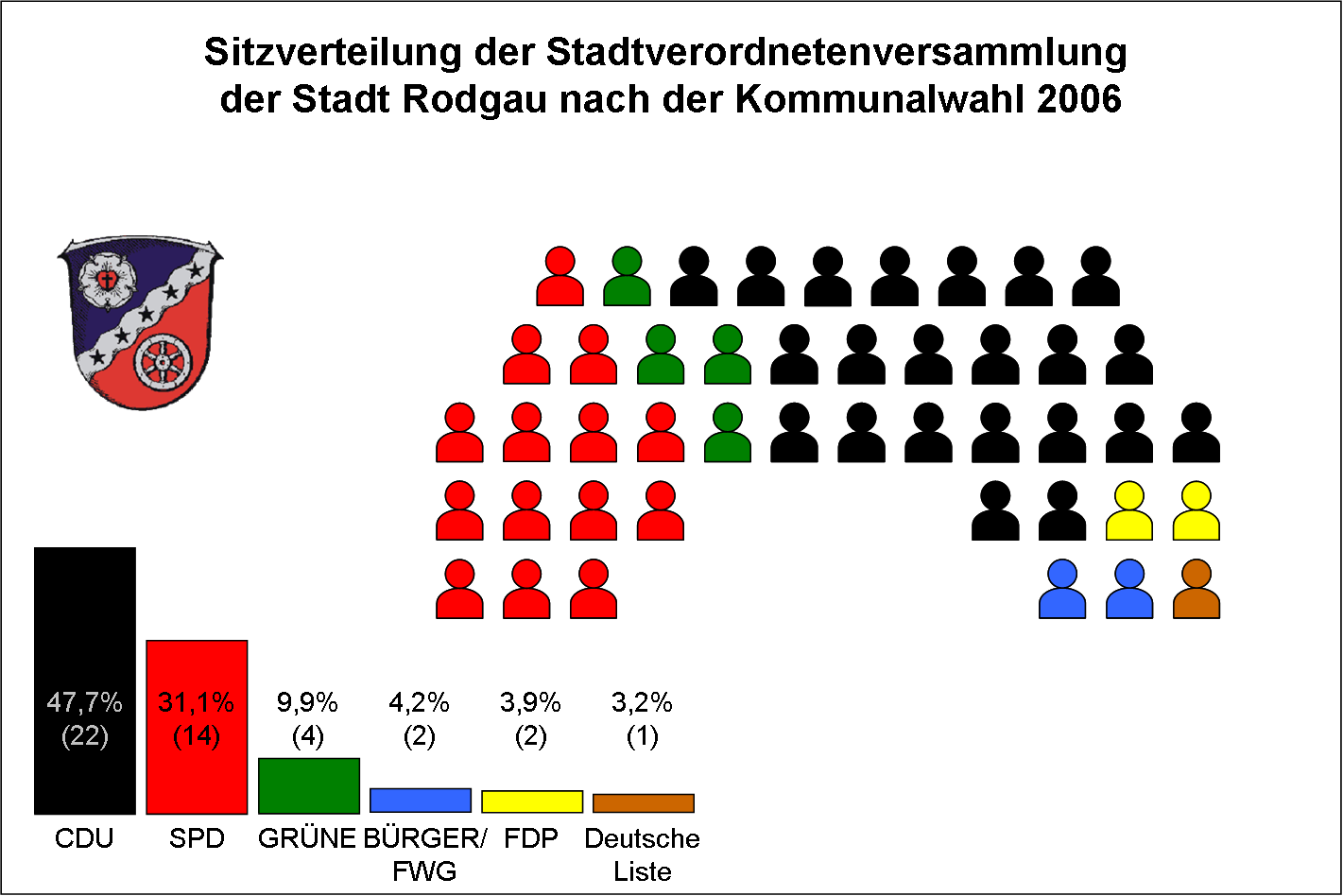
Apportionment of seats on Rodgau town council

Town council, as the highest political body in Rodgau, is elected every five years by eligible citizens. The municipal election held on 26 March 2006 yielded the following results: CDU 47.7%, SPD 31.1%, GRÜNE 9.9%, Bürger/FWG 4.2%, FDP 3.9%, Deutsche Liste 3.2%.

This has further yielded the following seat apportionment: CDU = 22, SPD = 14, Grüne = 4, Bürger/FWG = 2, FDP = 2, Deutsche Liste = 1. The CDU and FDP work together and between them have a three-vote majority in local government. These two parties are also the ones from which the two full-time members of the town executive come. These are each elected for six-year terms.

In late November 2006, three members from the CDU faction were excluded and since then have formed a further faction, styling themselves the CSG (Christlich Soziale Gruppe). This altered the seat apportionment and therefore the majority relationship as follows: CDU = 19, CSG = 3, SPD = 14, Grüne = 4, Bürger/FWG = 2, FDP = 2, Deutsche Liste = 1.

Town council furthermore chooses eight of its members to sit on the town executive (Magistrat), two full-time and the other six part-time. The mayor, who is directly elected by the citizenry every six years, chairs the executive.

The five constituent communities’ concerns are handled through local councils in each one. These, however, have only an advisory function at town council, and seats are apportioned according to election results in each constituent community.

Political bodies sit in the session chamber at Town Hall, which was completed in 1988 and stands in the constituent community of Jügesheim.

=== Coat of arms ===
The town's arms can be blazoned thus: Party per bend sinister azure a rose argent surmounted by a heart gules, itself surmounted by a Latin cross sable, gules a wheel spoked of six of the second, surmounting the parting a bend sinister wavy of the second, itself surmounted by five mullets of five of the fourth.

In 1978, the then greater community of Rodgau was granted a coat of arms. The German blazon reads: Das Wappen zeigt in Blau und in Rot einen gewellten silbernen Schräglingsbalken, belegt mit fünf Sternen, begleitet oben rechts von einer silbernen Rose mit silbernen Kelchblättern, diese belegt mit einem roten Herzen, dem ein schwarzes Kreuz aufliegt (Lutherrose), unten links von einem sechsspeichigen silbernen Mainzer Rad.

The escutcheon is divided in half by a wavy bend beginning at the upper sinister (armsbearer's left, viewer's right) side. This symbolizes the Rodau, which runs through the whole municipal area. The five mullets (stars) stand for the five constituent communities. On the dexter (armsbearer's right, viewer's left) side stands the “Luther rose” as a charge. This recalls Dudenhofen's time as an Evangelical enclave surrounded by Catholic neighbours. On the sinister (armsbearer's left, viewer's right) side is the Wheel of Mainz, borrowed from the arms borne by the Archbishops of Mainz. This recalls the time when Electoral Mainz succeeded the Lords of Eppstein in all constituent communities in 1425. Mainz's overlordship lasted in most constituent communities until Secularization in the early 19th century, but in Dudenhofen ended as early as the 17th century.

Until 1977, each constituent community had its own coat of arms as a self-administering community.

==== Weiskirchen ====
(Granted in 1958) The four waterwheels refer to the mills that were once found in Weiskirchen, and the white churchtower is canting, referring to the community's name, from the German for “white church”.

==== Hainhausen ====
(Granted in 1954) The arms show a stylized image of the former moated castle that once stood on the Rodau's right bank south of the road that leads to Weiskirchen, and that was once the family seat of the Lords of Hainhausen, who were first mentioned in 1122. Out of this family grew the Eppstein dynasty, whose arms with three chevronnets are included here in an inescutcheon. The tinctures silver and red refer to the arms borne by the Archbishops of Mainz, into whose ownership the village was sold in 1425.

==== Jügesheim ====
(Granted in 1955) The charges in these arms, both the oak sprig and the pair of hart's horns, were chosen to recall the days when Jügesheim was part of the Wildbann (royal hunting forest). The silver and red here likewise refer to the Wheel of Mainz arms borne by the Archbishops of Mainz.

==== Dudenhofen ====
(Granted in 1954) The three chevronnets recall the community's former allegiance to the County of Hanau. Below these is the Luther rose, which recalls Dudenhofen's time as an Evangelical enclave surrounded by Catholic neighbours. This charge is now also in the town's arms.

==== Nieder-Roden ====
(Granted in 1949) The churchtower shown in these arms is the one found at the local church, and is interesting from an art-history point of view. It is flanked in the arms by two inescutcheons, the chevronnets borne by the Lords of Eppstein on the dexter (armsbearer's right, viewer's left) side, and the Wheel of Mainz borne by the Archbishops of Mainz on the sinister (armsbearer's left, viewer's right) side. These stand for former feudal overlords.

== Economy and infrastructure ==
=== Economic development ===
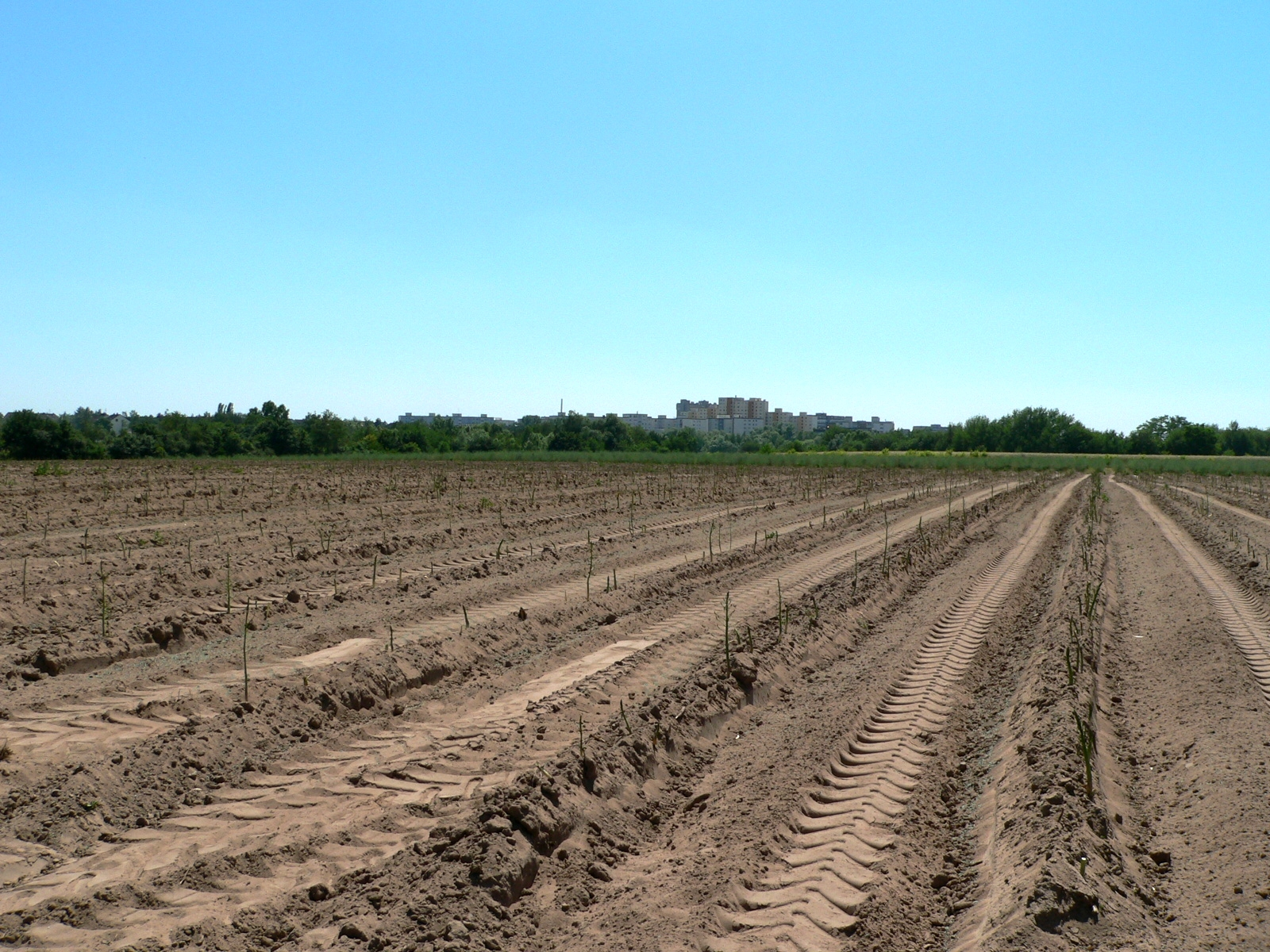
Asparagus field in Dudenhofen

Much as agriculture may have defined life in the formerly self-administering communities until the early 19th century, this changed with creeping industrialization, above all that in Offenbach. Most farmers took work in the nearby cities of Offenbach and Frankfurt and thereafter ran their farms only as a sideline.

In the mid 20th century, many small and midsize businesses in the leatherworking industry set up shop in the Rodgau's communities. Its products – handbags, suitcases, belts, wallets and purses – were made mostly in private homes as a kind of cottage industry. By 1975, this had led to the almost complete disappearance of the farming sideline. In 2004, only eleven farms were still being worked as main income earners, mostly to grow asparagus, and four were still being worked as a sideline.

Besides leatherworking, metalworking also locally became a field of endeavour at roughly the same time to supply belt buckles, suitcase handles and suchlike. Major works were located in Weiskirchen, Jügesheim and Nieder-Roden. Nowadays, though, leatherware manufacturing and metalworking play only a subordinate rôle.

In 1954, a new field of industry for this region established itself on Dudenhofen's outskirts, the Dudenhofen Sand Lime Works (Kalksandsteinwerk Dudenhofen), which quarried the fine dune sand available there for making up to 73 million bricks in one year. In the 1990s the company shifted its production focus to manufacturing porous concrete precision blocks (Plansteine), today known under the name Porit.

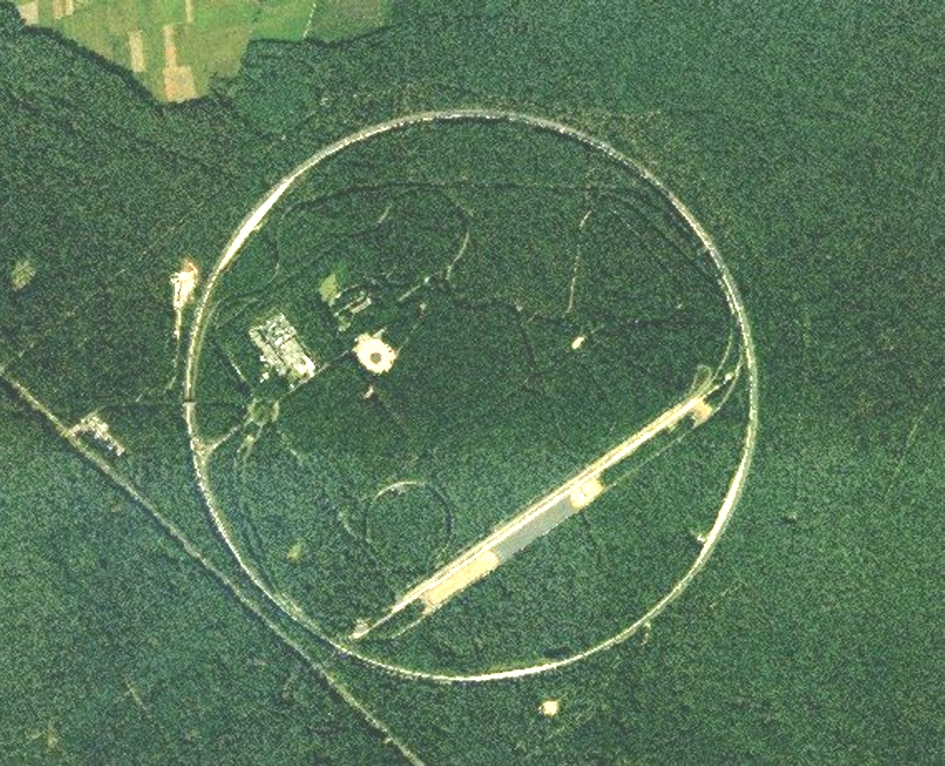
Aerial photograph of the Opel Test Centre in Dudenhofen

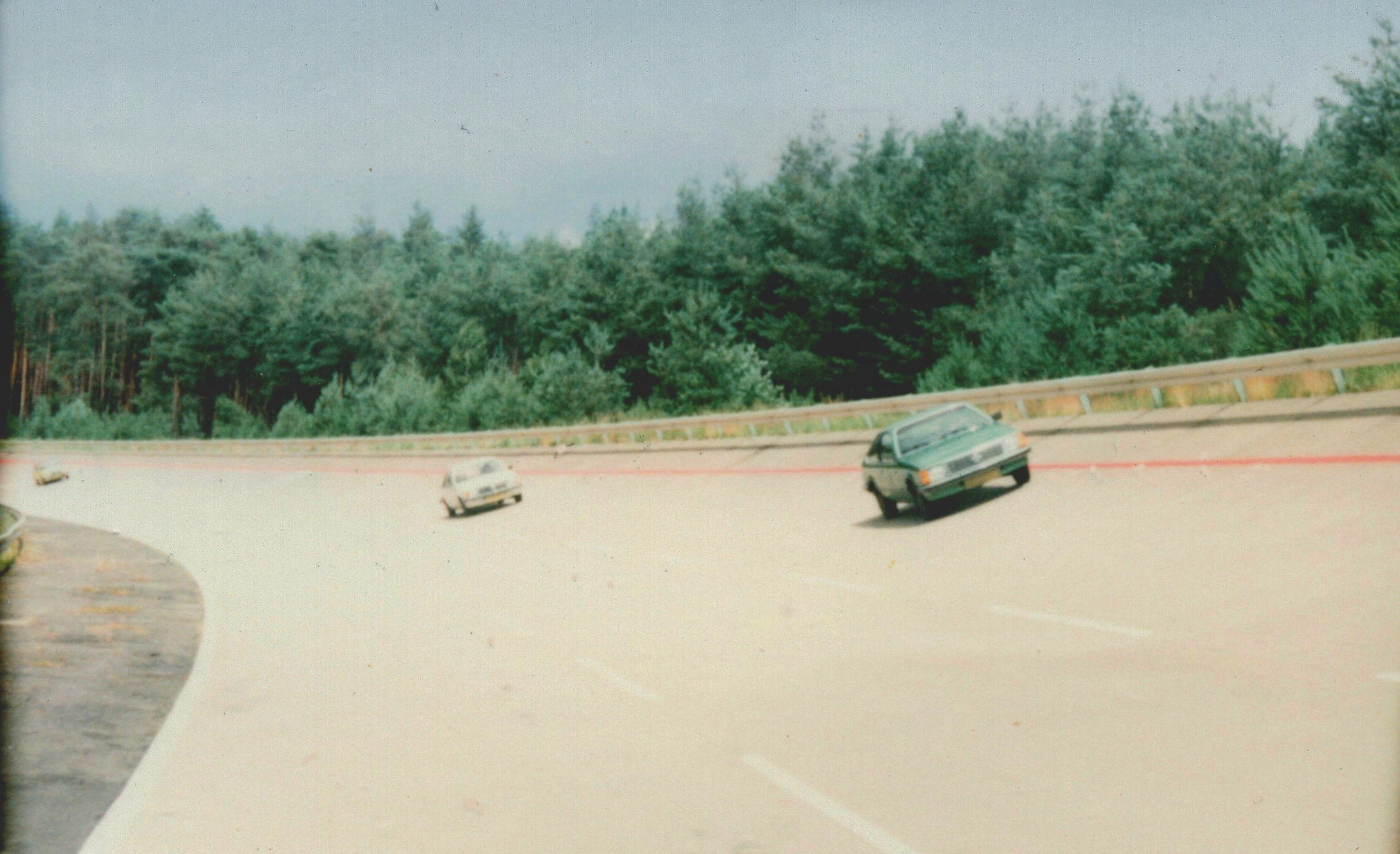
High-speed track at the Opel Test Centre

In the early 1960s, Adam Opel AG chose Dudenhofen as the location for their test centre, which came into service in 1966. In the middle of a 4.8 km-long high-speed loop track are found a crash-test facility and a 6.7 km-long test track with all conceivable road types for longterm tests.

Beginning in the 1960s, Rodgau opened up six major industrial parks with a combined area of 219 ha in which settled mainly service businesses such as the IBM product distribution centre (until 2005, thereafter Mann-Mobilia logistics centre), the firm Atlas Rhein Main, the FEGRO wholesale market, MEWA Textilservice, GEODIS, Pepsi-Cola Deutschland, PerkinElmer Life and Analytical Sciences and a DHL postal freight centre. All together, in mid-2005, there were reported to be 3,871 businesses in Rodgau, among them 23 supermarkets from the best known chains and 16 hotels with 795 beds.

The trend of shifting from producing industries and crafts to service industries became clear when 2003 is compared to 1987: ten years after the greater community was founded, service industries comprised 52% of the economy, but this share rose over the next 15 years to 73%.

In Rodgau, roughly 150 high technology companies are resident. Dominating the technological field is information and communications technology for aviation and space travel, followed by sensor, measuring, control and analytical technology. Furthermore, production technology, automatic surface finishing, microelectronics and optoelectronics are also represented.

In 2005, Rodgau's commercial operations made available all together 9,076 jobs on the social insurance rolls. Moreover, there were roughly 3,000 jobs for the self-employed, officials and those marginally employed.

A great number of Rodgau's working people have jobs in the nearby cities: Frankfurt am Main (25 km away), Frankfurt Airport (30 km away), Offenbach am Main (15 km away), Hanau (15 km away), Darmstadt (20 km away) and Aschaffenburg (20 km away).

=== Transport ===
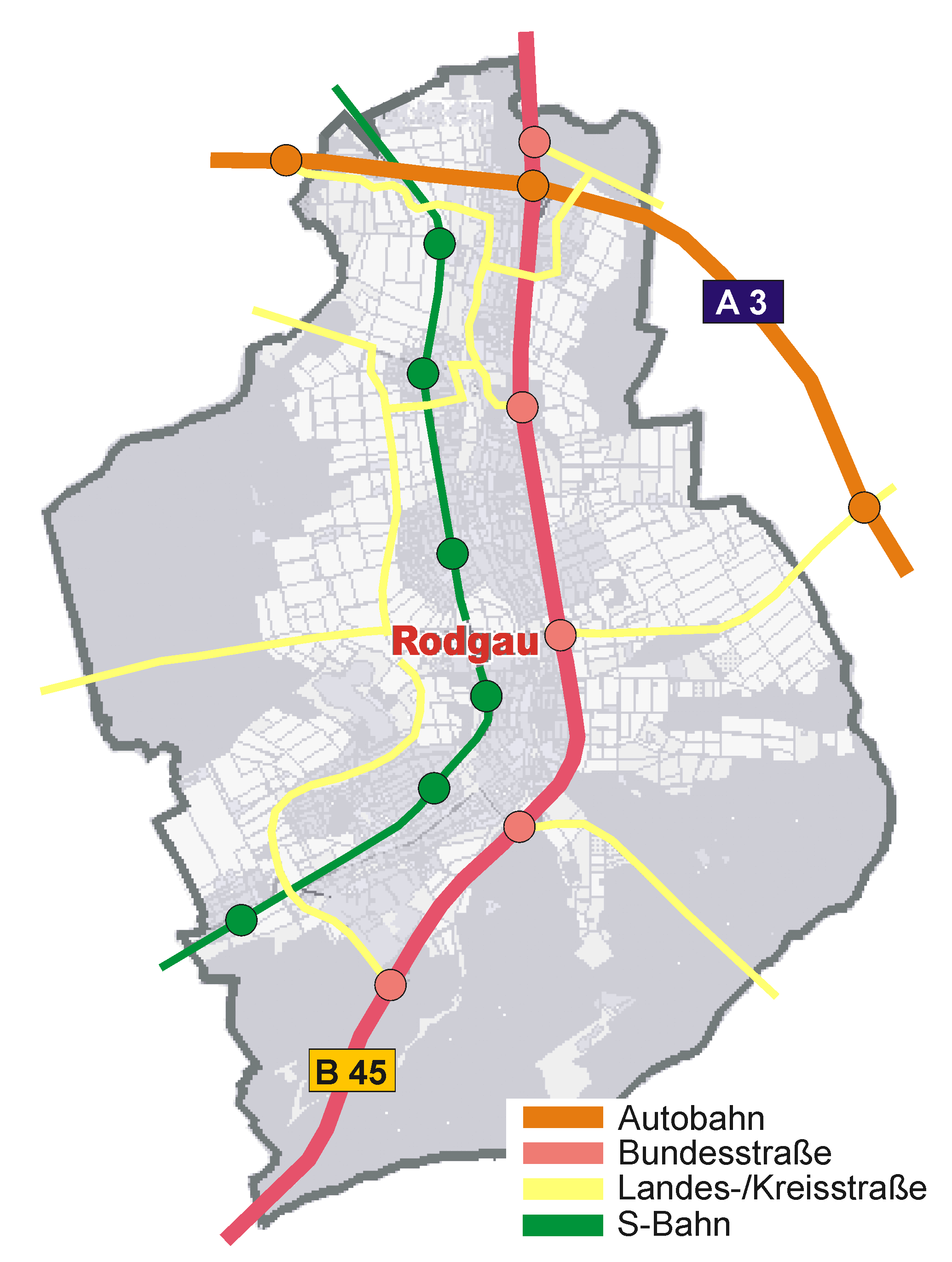
Rodgau's transport connections

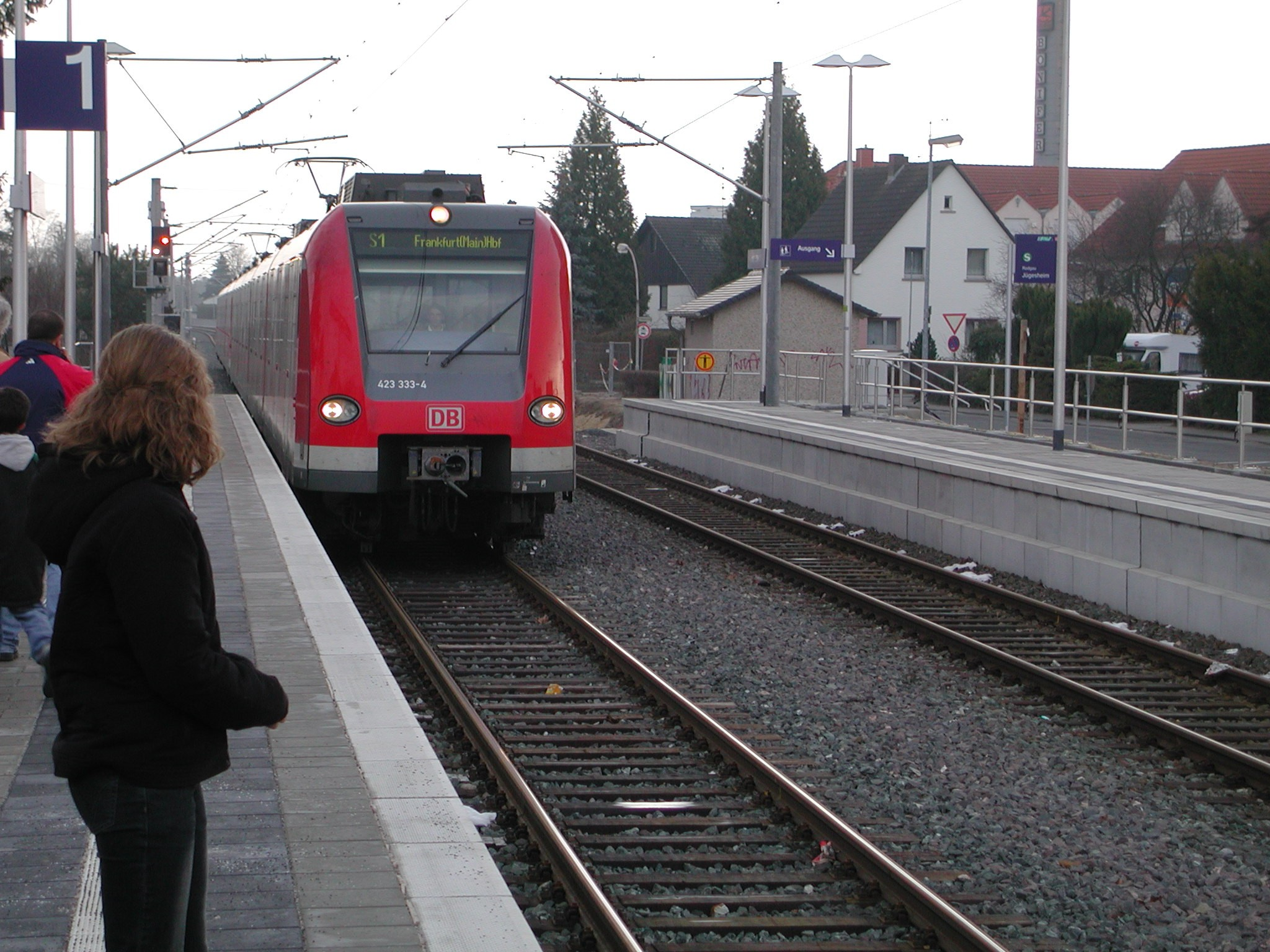
S-Bahn line S1 at Rodgau-Jügesheim

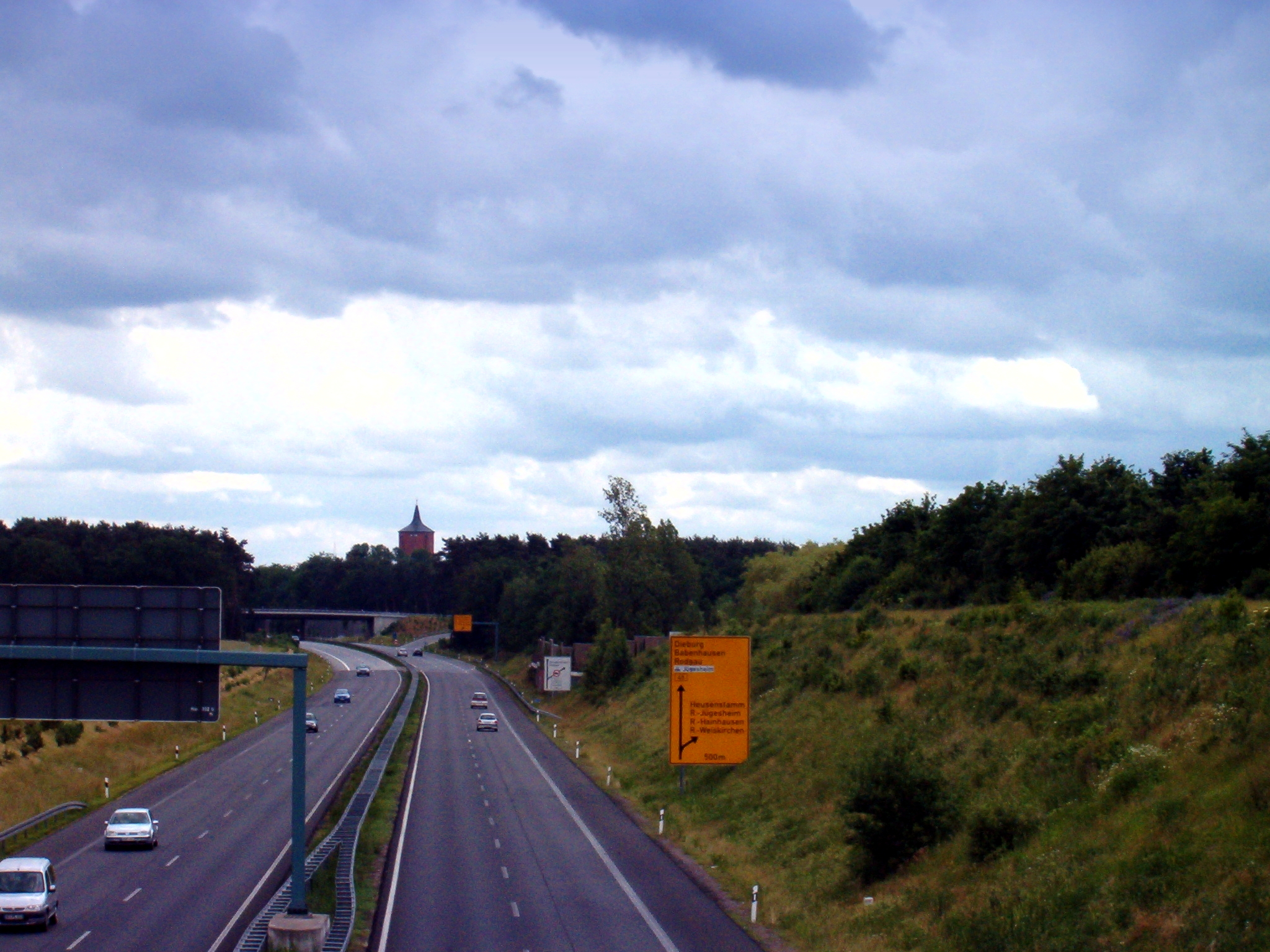
Bundesstraße 45 in Rodgau-Jügesheim

==== Local public transport ====
Since 14 December 2003, all Rodgau's constituent communities have been linked to the broad network of the Rhine-Main S-Bahn by the extension of line S1 from Wiesbaden to Ober-Roden. Until that time, Rodgau had been served by the Rodgaubahn (railway).

There is regular bus service to the railway stations at Nieder-Roden and Jügesheim on the S1 through district buslines to Babenhausen, Seligenstadt, Dietzenbach and Langen and town buslines to Hainhausen, Weiskirchen and Rollwald.

=== Cycle path network ===
The town of Rodgau is slowly finding at its disposal a network of cycle paths which are being laid out in collaboration with the Allgemeiner Deutscher Fahrrad-Club (“General German Bicycle Club”, ADFC), and which link all five constituent communities together. Since 2005, the signposted Rodgau-Rundweg has run through fields and woods right round the town. At 42.1 km in length it runs to almost marathon distance. On both sides of the S-Bahn line, a 14 km-long, asphalt-paved cycle path from Rollwald to Weiskirchen links all constituent communities. Special bicycle parking places with stands and lockable rental boxes are to be found at every S-Bahn station.

=== Pedestrian precincts ===
Pedestrian precincts have been laid out in Nieder-Roden between the S-Bahn station and Puiseauxplatz (square) and in Jügesheim on Rodgau-Passage. Areas with much reduced traffic with their attendant paving can be found in all constituent communities, mostly in the old community cores and in new development areas. Walking paths through the Rodau-Aue in Dudenhofen and Jügesheim, partly laid out like a park, are reserved for pedestrians. An extensive network of signposted hiking trails threads its way through fields and woods in Rodgau's municipal area.

=== Roads ===
In Rodgau's north, the A 3 (Frankfurt-Würzburg) runs through the municipal area and crosses Bundesstraße 45 (Hanau-Dieburg), which has been expanded to expresswaylike proportions, and which runs north–south, touching all constituent communities, and has four interchanges. The Weiskirchen service centre within Rodgau town limits on the A 3 can be reached by drivers going in either direction. Adjoining the northern rest area is a motel. With the A 3's extension from Offenbach to Würzburg in the 1960s, both service centres, for the first time in Germany, were outfitted as automats. This concept, however, was abandoned in the early 1980s and they were converted to self-service restaurants.

The western residential areas are linked by the 11 km-long Rodgau-Ring-Straße (ringroad), which in the north runs on to Heusenstamm and Offenbach. The Dietzenbach-Rodgau-Seligenstadt cross-district road links Rodgau once again to the A 3. Weiskirchen is furthermore linked to the A 3 through the Obertshausen interchange.

Since 2001, six heavily used intersections within Rodgau town limits have been replaced with roundabouts with raised, plant-covered islands. To reduce traffic in residential areas, four further, small roundabouts have been built.

=== Parking ===
At the bathing lake in Nieder-Roden there are roughly 2,000 parking places right near the entrance to the bathing beach. At all six S-Bahn stations, 400 “park & ride” places are available all together. Jügesheim has at its disposal two underground parking garages in the community core, and at the community centres in Dudenhofen, Weiskirchen and Nieder-Roden, and at every sport hall are found major carparks. Even the five forest leisure facilities offer goodly parking, as does the hiking carpark in the eastern woods on the Lange Schneise (“Long Aisle”).

=== Air transport ===
The proximity to Frankfurt Airport – and the easy access thereto afforded by the S-Bahn – make possible international economic links. Of course, holidaymakers also benefit from this proximity.

Between Offenbach and Darmstadt, some 25 km from Rodgau, lies Frankfurt Egelsbach Airport, the busiest airport for general aviation in Germany. With its roughly 77,000 movements each year, it relieves and complements Frankfurt Airport.

== Media ==
=== Newspapers ===
The widely distributed daily newspapers Frankfurter Rundschau and Offenbach-Post contain in their editions for the Offenbach district a Rodgau local section. Also, on Thursdays comes the free Rodgau-Post from the Offenbach-Post’s publishing house. Also free are two further locally oriented weekly newspapers which are delivered to households, the Bürgerblatt and the Rodgau-Zeitung. Also, the Dreieich-Spiegel deals with Rodgau happenings peripherally.

=== Cable network ===
Many households in Rodgau can choose to have a supply of 32 television and 35 radio channels over the cable network run by Unitymedia. The signals are fed into the system at the Rödermark centre. Since 2005, Rodgau has also had a broadband network which can bring digital television and radio channels to every household.

=== DVB-T reception ===
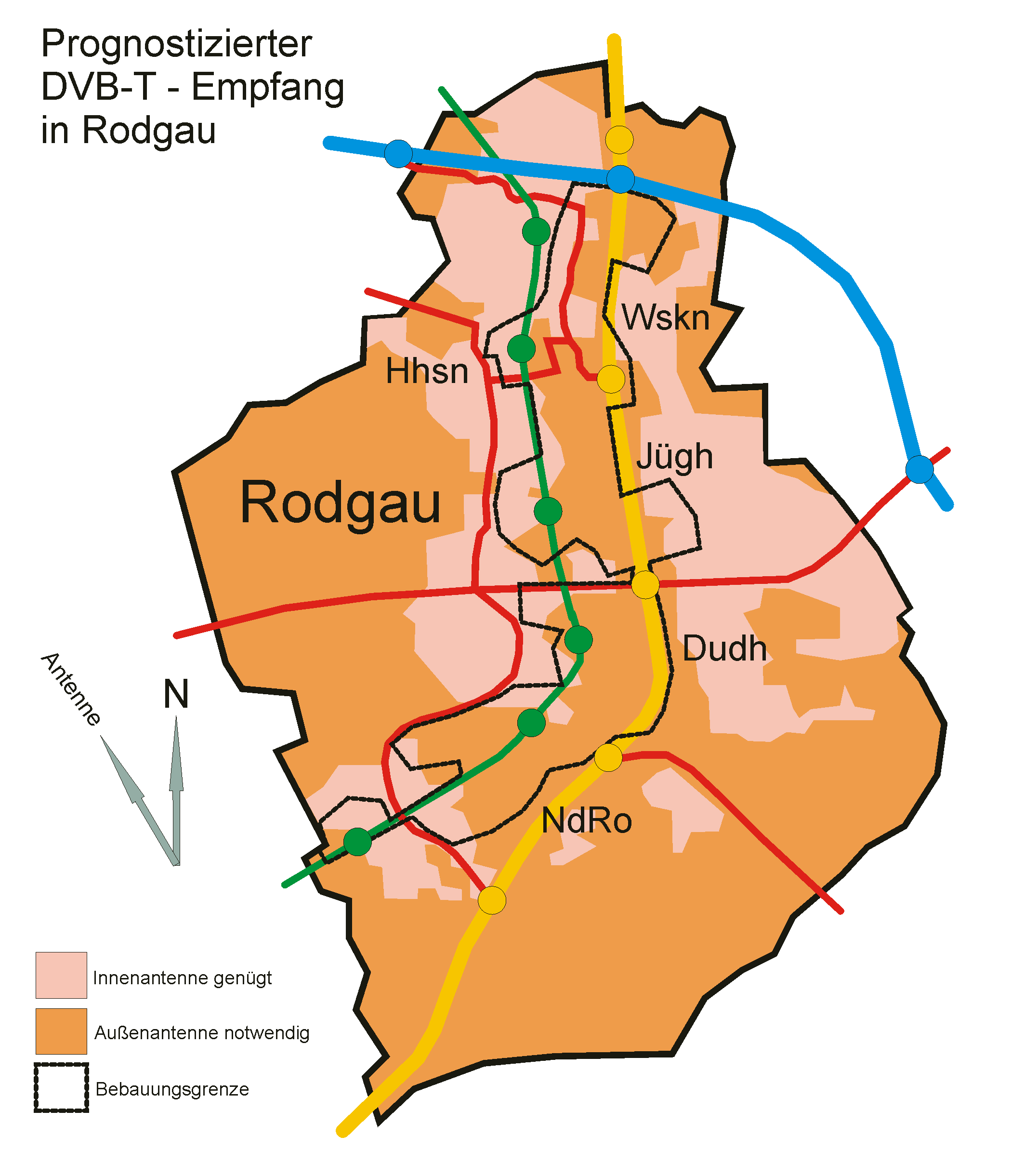
Forecast DVB-T reception in Rodgau showing whether an indoor or outdoor antenna is required.

On 28 May 2006, transmission of analogue television signals to Rodgau from the Großer Feldberg and Würzberg Transmitters ended. Digital terrestrial broadcasting (DVB-T) took over broadcasting over the area the next day. Since then Rodgau has lain in the broadcast areas of the Großer Feldberg and Frankfurt Transmitters. The television signal can be received with an indoor or outdoor antenna depending on area.

=== Radio ===
Owing to the proximity to the economic metropolis of Frankfurt, Rodgau lies within the reporting area of the following radio stations:

- Hessischer Rundfunk 1–4 as well as youfm and hr-info
- Hitradio FFH (Bad Vilbel)
- Radio Primavera (Aschaffenburg)
- Radio Fortuna (Heusenstamm)

Since August 2008, the local radio station K.C.-Radio in the Rodgau constituent community of Jügesheim has been on the air.

=== Development ===
Given each constituent community's original village structure, their natural centres each lay around the church. This was so even after the merger into the greater community in 1977, except for Nieder-Roden. There, beginning in 1950, the fivefold swelling of the population demanded that residential building be expanded heavily towards the northwest, establishing the so-called Gartenstadt (“Garden Town”), and that a new community core be developed, with a post office, shops, a clinic, and a community and social services centre. Here, under planning by the Baugilde Süd (“Building Guild South”) also arose in the late 1960s several developments of compact dwellings with up to twelve floors. Most striking in today's skyline is the development known locally as the Chinamauer (“China Wall”), a roughly 300 m-long block of maisonette flats. The original plan called for the development to be 900 m long, but this never came about.

Despite the town's neverending growth, it has no hospital. The nearest one is found in Seligenstadt.

Building developments since 1979 enabled population growth and led to the establishment of social infrastructure such as kindergartens, schools, and sport and leisure facilities. Although the town has grown together, it lacks a central town centre. The individual constituent communities maintain their existing structures.

Since 1998, the Lokale Agenda 21 has been flowing as the leading stream of thought in shaping the town. A board of dedicated citizens developed a guiding image for the townsfolk whose goal is sustainability as a “roof” for economy, environment, social services, culture, one world, and so on. The board was granted an advisory function to town council and the right to speak at council meetings, and it worked out suggestions for, among other things, renaturalization and desegregation. Since 2002, the Agenda 21 Quality Phase has been running, that is to say the actual implementation of the suggestions until 2017. The board itself was dissolved in 2003 after the end of the Growth Phase (1998–2002).

=== Churches ===
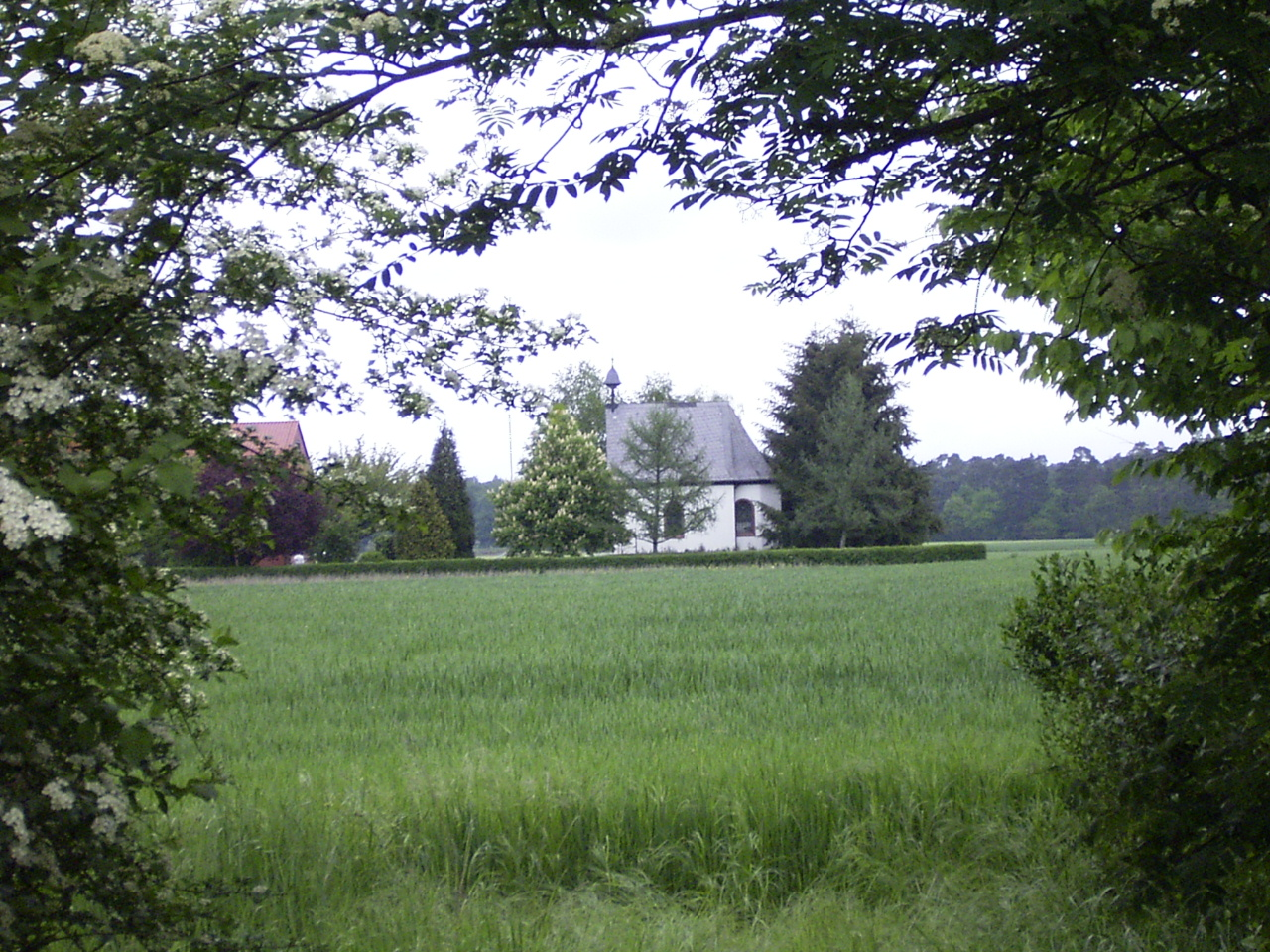
Schönstatt-Zentrum Chapel

At five Evangelical and six Catholic churches and community centres, regular services are held. The Islamic community gathers at a small mosque in Nieder-Roden. Evangelical Christians number 25.5% in Rodgau, Catholics 39.0%. The other 35.5% either belong to other denominations, or adhere to no faith.

On Rodgau-Weiskirchen's eastern outskirts, there has been since 1982 a conference and training centre of the Catholic International Apostolic Schönstatt Movement in the Bishopric of Mainz.

=== Education ===
Besides 25 kindergartens, there is in Rodgau – owing in some measure to the long time during which the current constituent communities were self-administering – a broad array of different kinds of school. There is the Gymnasium upper level at the Claus-von-Stauffenberg-Schule in Dudenhofen with grade levels 11 to 13. There are the Georg-Büchner-Schule in Jügesheim and the Geschwister-Scholl-Schule in Hainhausen, both coöperative comprehensive schools, and also the Heinrich-Böll-Schule in Nieder-Roden, an integrated comprehensive school. There are six primary schools: the Freiherr-vom-Stein-Grundschule in Dudenhofen, the Carl-Orff-Schule in Jügesheim, the Gartenstadt-Schule in Nieder-Roden, the Grundschule am Bürgerhaus in Nieder-Roden, the Münchhausen-Schule in Hainhausen and the Wilhelm-Busch-Schule in Jügesheim. The Georg-Büchner-Schule, the Heinrich-Böll-Schule, the Geschwister-Scholl-Schule and a few other schools located elsewhere form a school league within whose framework an exchange of experience and the planning of common projects and classwork take place. Moreover, there is in Weiskirchen the Friedrich-von-Bodelschwingh-Schule für Praktisch Bildbare (special school for trainable pupils). The town also maintains a folk high school and promotes the Freie Musikschule Rodgau.

=== Sport and leisure facilities ===
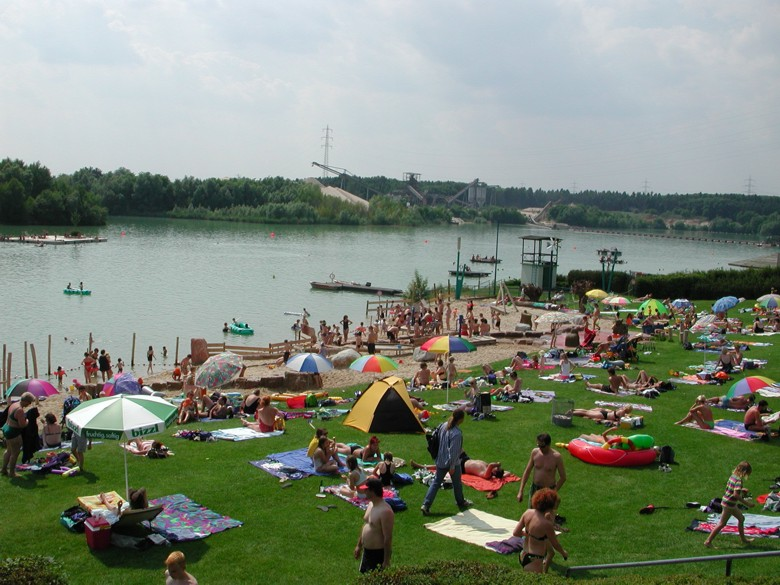
Rodgau swimming beach, the famous “St. Tropez on the Quarry Pond”

Besides the bathing beach and free beach on the 32.4 ha Rodgausee with its up to 300,000 visitors yearly, there are several forest recreational facilities, barbecue pits and two miniature golf courses within town limits. Those who play sports have on hand three sport centres, five sport fields, five sport halls with several functions, four gymnasia, two fitness paths and several horseback riding facilities. Seven tennis facilities and a tennis hall are likewise among the offerings, along with a beach volleyball facility with three courts at the bathing beach and a big skating facility. Sporting life in Rodgau is in the care of 55 sport clubs in the town.

Among the regular yearly highlights in municipal sport are the 50-km-Ultramarathon Rodgau run by RLT Rodgau in January, a triathlon in August, the 24-Stunden-Lauf Rodgau (24-hour walk) in September and the Drachenfest (“Dragon Festival”), likewise in September.

== Culture ==
Forty-nine clubs nurture the town's cultural life with many choir and orchestra concerts, readings, theatrical productions, dance tournaments, art exhibitions and workshops. The town's cultural office yearly offers a theatre season (three subscription series) with well-known artists and the regionally noted art exhibition at the Nieder-Roden community centre.

Two other community centres are found in the constituent communities of Weiskirchen and Dudenhofen.

In the constituent communities of Weiskirchen Jügesheim and Nieder-Roden, “homeland clubs” take it upon themselves to run museums whose collections deal with each community's history. On Friedensstraße in Nieder-Roden is found the region's only DDR-Museum (“East Germany Museum”). This museum offers a detailed overview of what were once the consequences of a divided Germany.

Four cinemas and seven public libraries round the cultural life out.

Since 1979, the €2,500 “Cultural Prize of the Town of Rodgau” (Kulturpreis der Stadt Rodgau) for outstanding performance by a Rodgau artist or project has been given out every year, since 1992 alternating with the “Cultural Promotion Prize” (Kulturförderpreis), specially for young artists.

Rodgau became well known countrywide for hits by the band the Rodgau Monotones, for example St. Tropez am Baggersee (“St. Tropez on the Quarry Pond”, which is the nickname for the local bathing beach in the town) or Erbarme, die Hesse komme (“Have mercy, the Hessians are coming”). The Rodgau Monotones received the Cultural Prize of the Town of Rodgau in 1983.

In Rodgau, four amateur theatrical groups, whose productions are a firm part of Rodgau's cultural life, are active on a club level. The Nieder-Roden group Das Große Welttheater, having gained note among thousands of spectators both in and beyond the region for its theatre projects, won the Cultural Prize in 1996 and the Cultural Promotion Prize in 2000.

=== Fasching (Fastnacht) ===
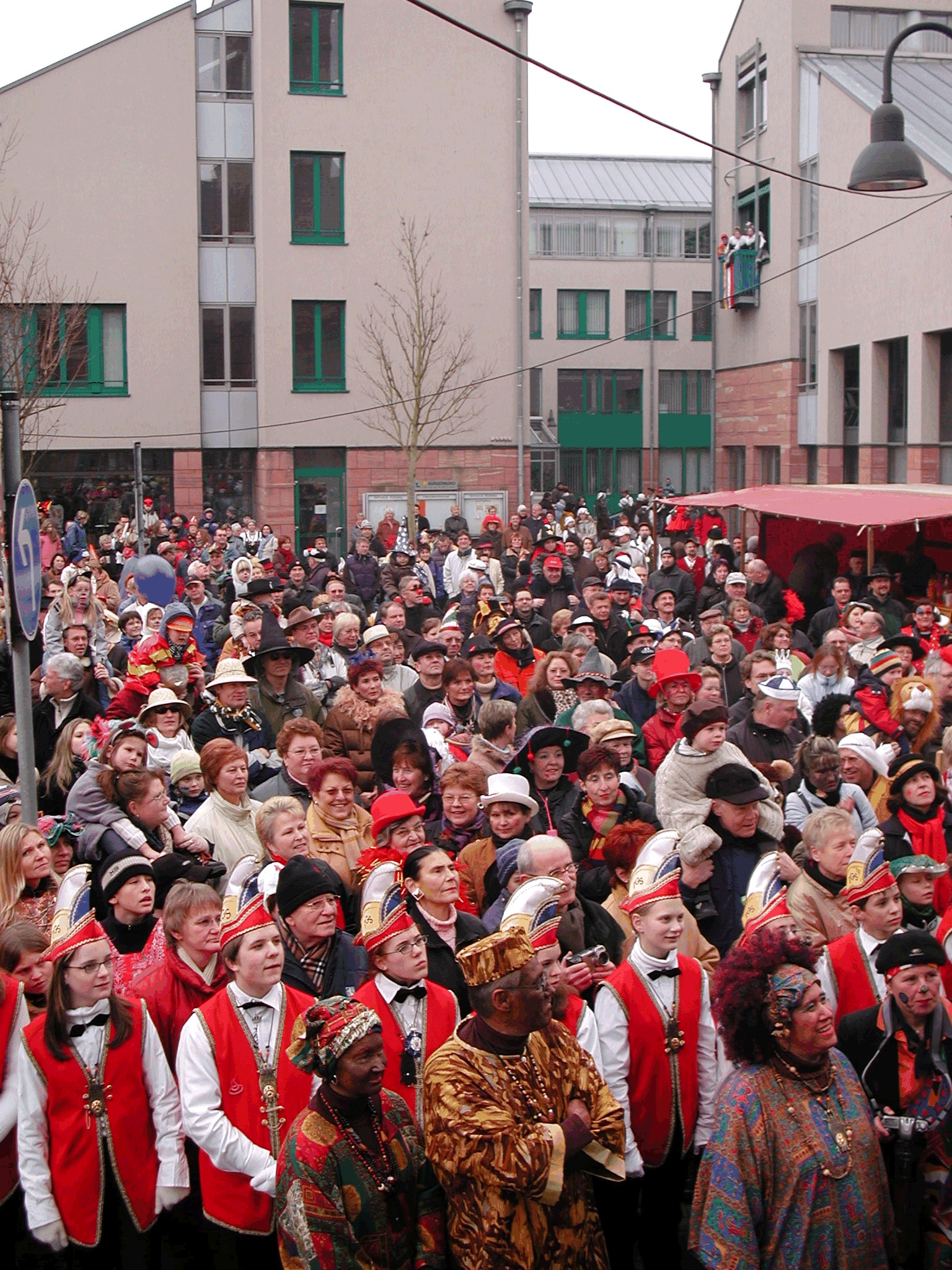
Town Hall storm on Carnival Saturday

Fasching (Fastnacht, Fassenacht) is celebrated lustily in Rodgau. Said to be the Carnival's stronghold in Rodgau is Jügesheim (dialectal name: Giesem). Here, before the Town hall on 11 November, the opening of the “campaign” takes place, and on the Saturday before Ash Wednesday the opening of the “Town Hall storm”, the symbolic transfer of the town's administration to the fools. On the Thursday before Ash Wednesday the Carnival parade winds its way through Jügesheim's streets.

The Carnival representatives, the Carnival Prince and Princess and the Child Prince and Princess, have in more recent times not always come from Jügesheim. Other constituent communities may now enter contestants.

== Sightseeing ==
An historic town core is something that Rodgau, given the way it came into being, simply cannot offer. A lack of awareness of the worth of old buildings led, especially in the years after the Second World War, to the wholesale destruction of many timber-frame buildings in the old communities. Only in the early 1970s were historical buildings that were still standing systematically catalogued and ranked according to criteria for monumental protection.

The five former village churches from the 13th to 19th centuries even today still mark the old village cores. In the 1990s, with the church parishes’, the municipality's and many volunteers’ support, they were renovated and also put back in their original states. The Gothic tower at the Matthias-Kirche (“Saint Matthew’s Church”) in Nieder-Roden is Rodgau's oldest preserved building. Within the churches themselves are found objects of importance to art history from various epochs. Particularly worthy of mention among these is the Late Gothic Marienaltar ("Mary’s Altar") in Nieder-Roden's Catholic Matthias-Kirche, which comes from the time about 1520, and is ascribed to the Riemenschneider school.

Single timber-frame houses scattered about the municipal area from the 16th to 19th centuries have been restored and today adorn the old village cores. A few buildings, such as the bakehouse (Backes) in Dudenhofen have been built once again from old plans.

The watertower in Jügesheim, opened in 1938 and operated until 1979 is said from its architectural uniqueness and bold static construction to be an industrial monument. It shows clear echoes of the expressionistic style of the 1920s.

Three of the four railway station buildings on the former Rodgaubahn opened in 1896 are said to be worthy of preservation, but are still awaiting renovation and new uses. Another historical building is an old fire station in which is housed the Weiskirchen local history museum.

Worth seeing, too, are the eleven artistically made fountains as well as many sculptures and façade paintings that characterize the town.

Many dedicated citizens contribute to the further bettering of the town's appearance through donations, street festivals and hands-on work, and to the building and expansion of a civic culture.

A further highlight of Rodgau is the Drachenfest ("Kite Festival") with its firework contest, held every year in late September.

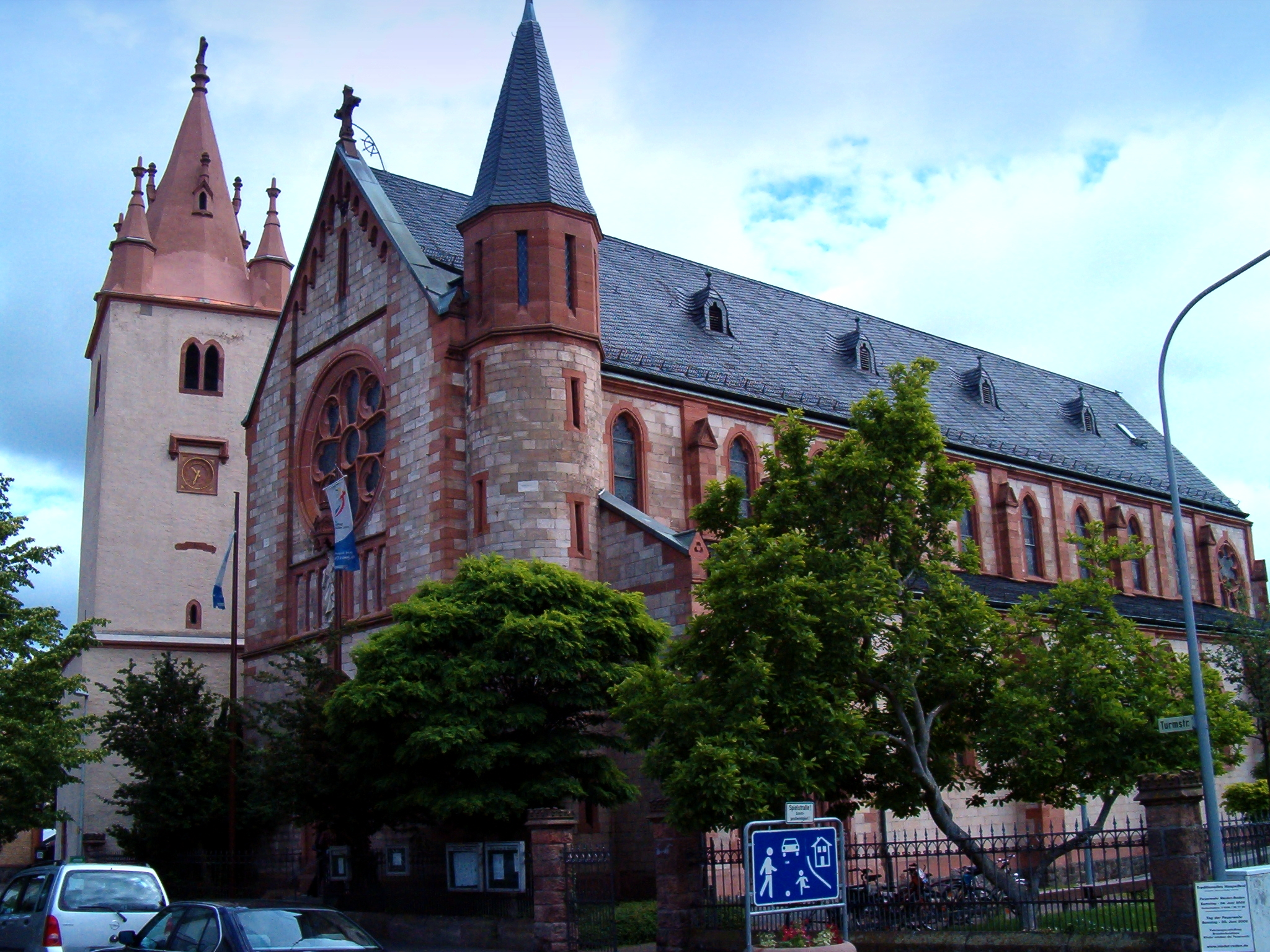
St. Matthias in Nieder-Roden, tower from 1298

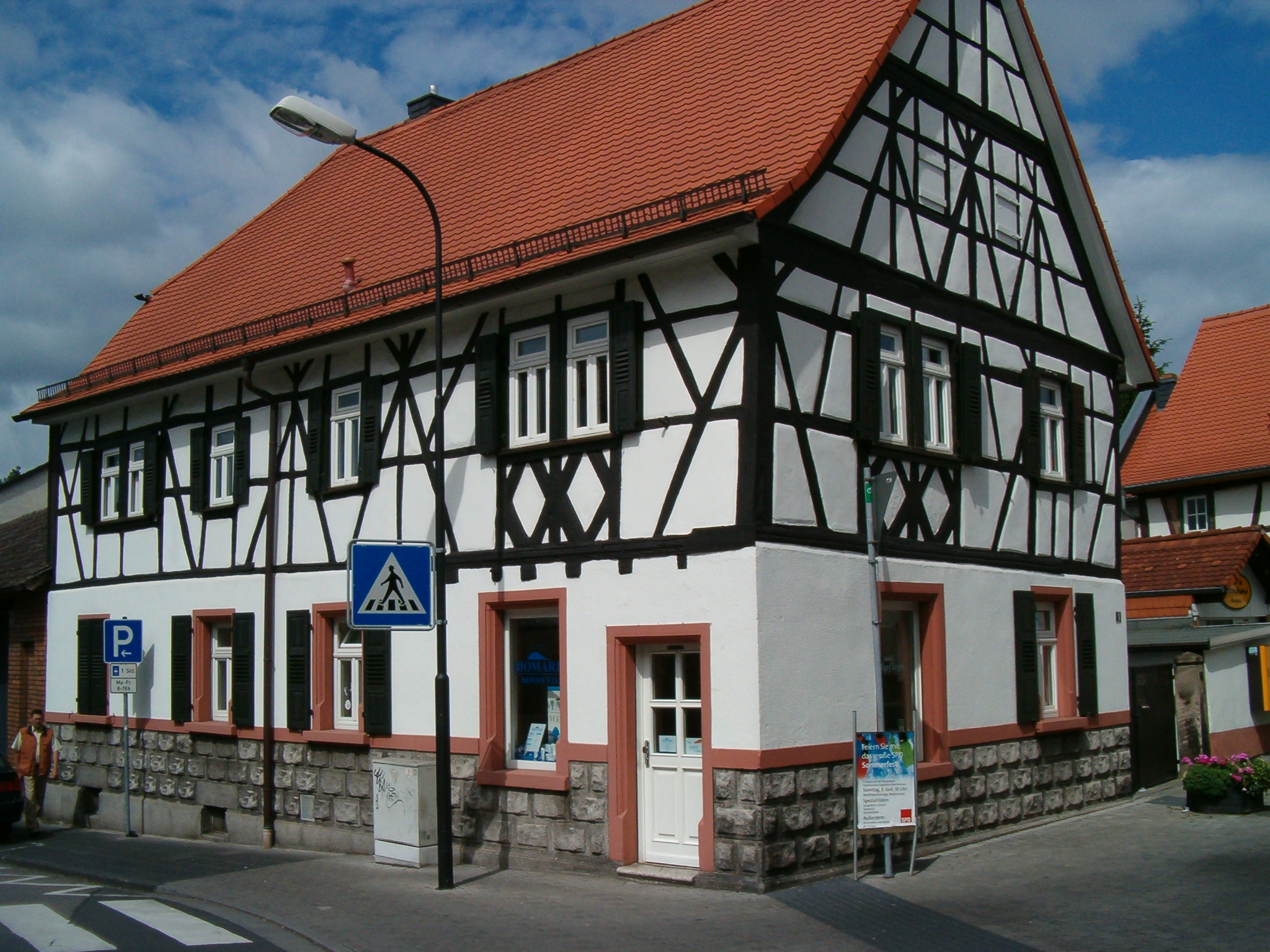
Timber-frame house in Jügesheim

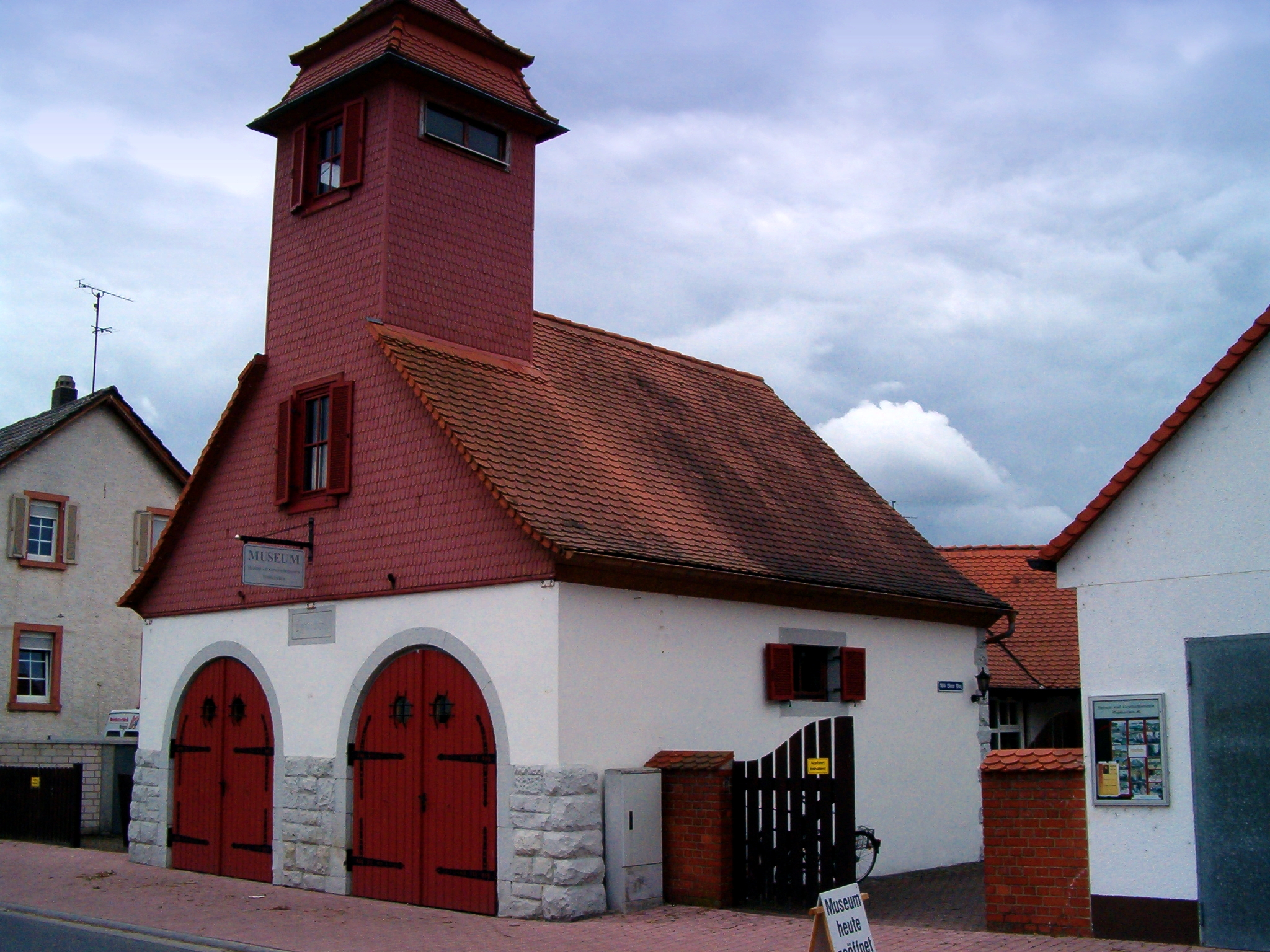
Old fire station in Weiskirchen

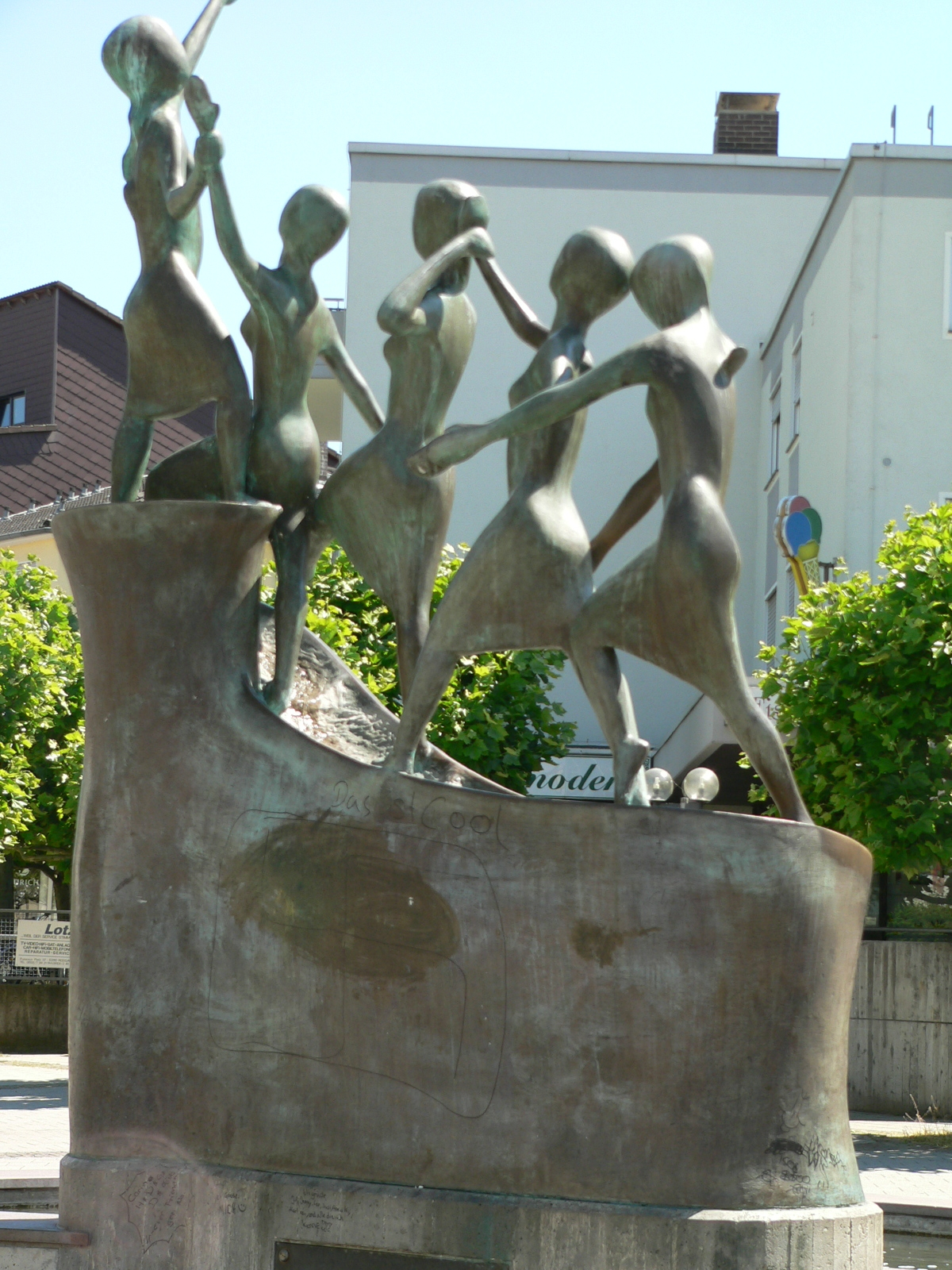
Motif well on Nieder-Roden's Puiseauxplatz

== Twin towns – sister cities ==
Rodgau is twinned with:

- Puiseaux, France (1974, originally with Nieder-Roden)
- Hainburg an der Donau, Austria (1974, originally with Nieder-Roden)
- Nieuwpoort, Belgium (1975, originally with Dudenhofen)
- Donja Stubica, Croatia (2002)

== Notable people ==
- Jennifer Hof (born 1991), model, winner of Germany's Next Topmodel (season 3)

=== Associated with the town ===
- Jean Darling (1922–2015), American actress and singer, lived in Rodgau
- Herbert Feuerstein (1937–2020), Austrian-German journalist and comedian, lived in Rodgau Nieder-Roden in 1989–1993
- Rio Reiser (1950–1996), rock musician, lived in Rodgau Nieder-Roden in 1965–1968
- Nicole Brown Simpson (1959–1994), victim of O. J. Simpson, lived as a child in Nieder-Roden-Rollwald
- Sönke Neitzel (born 1968), historian, raised there

=== Honorary citizens ===
- Willy Purm (1918–1991), town executive chairman 1972–1989
- Paul Scherer (born 1935), mayor 1980–1998
