= Langenholtensen =

Village in Lower Saxony, Germany

Coordinates: 51°43′N 10°01′E

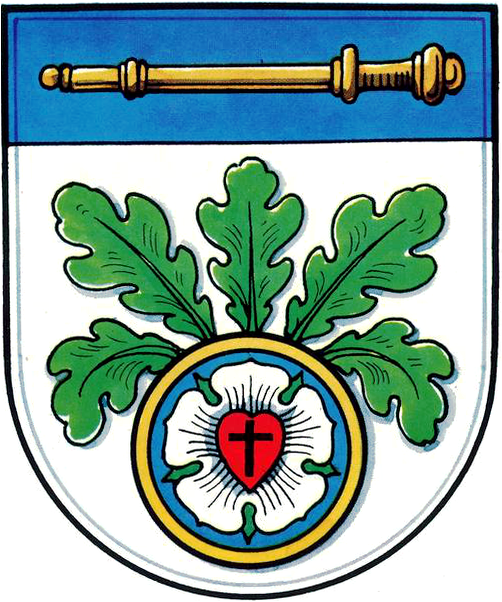

Langenholtensen is a village near the town of Northeim and part of that town, in Lower Saxony. The name comes from Holzhausen, a quite frequently occurring place-name in Germany.

== Geography ==
The village of Langenholtensen lies just north of Northeim. It is located between the Edesheimer forest in the north, the Rethoberg in the northeast, and the Sultmerberg in the west.

== The Arms ==
The village's arms or blazon were granted on October 1, 1951. The lower part of the arms symbolize the Luther-oak in the village, planted in 1833 and now a natural monument. It is symbolized by the oak leaves and the Luther rose with the cross, taken from the arms of German reformer Martin Luther. The chief shows a staff, symbol of the Amt Brunstein court, which was situated in Langenholtensen.

== History ==
The Protestant priest Johannes Letzner was appointed to the village in 1564. Despite the fact that the Luther rose is incorporated into the village's arms, there is no evidence that Martin Luther ever visited Langenholtensen.

== Population ==
- 1775: 471
- 1963: 1,520
- 2005: 1,860
