= Luther rose =

Widely recognized symbol for Lutheranism

The Luther rose

The Luther rose or Luther seal is a widely recognized symbol for Lutheranism. It was the seal that was designed for Martin Luther at the behest of John Frederick of Saxony in 1530, while Luther was staying at the Coburg Fortress during the Diet of Augsburg. Lazarus Spengler, to whom Luther wrote his interpretation below, sent Luther a drawing of this seal. Luther saw it as a compendium or expression of his theology and faith, which he used to authorize his correspondence. Luther informed Philipp Melanchthon on 15 September 1530, that the Prince had personally visited him in the Coburg fortress and presented him with a signet ring, presumably displaying the seal.

== Parts of the seal connected to Luther before 1530 ==
A single rose had been known as Luther’s emblem since 1520, when Wolfgang Stöckel in Leipzig published one of Luther's sermons with a woodcut of the reformer. This was the first contemporary depiction of Martin Luther.

Luther's doctoral ring displayed a heart-like shield, the symbol of the Holy Trinity.

== Luther's interpretation of his seal ==
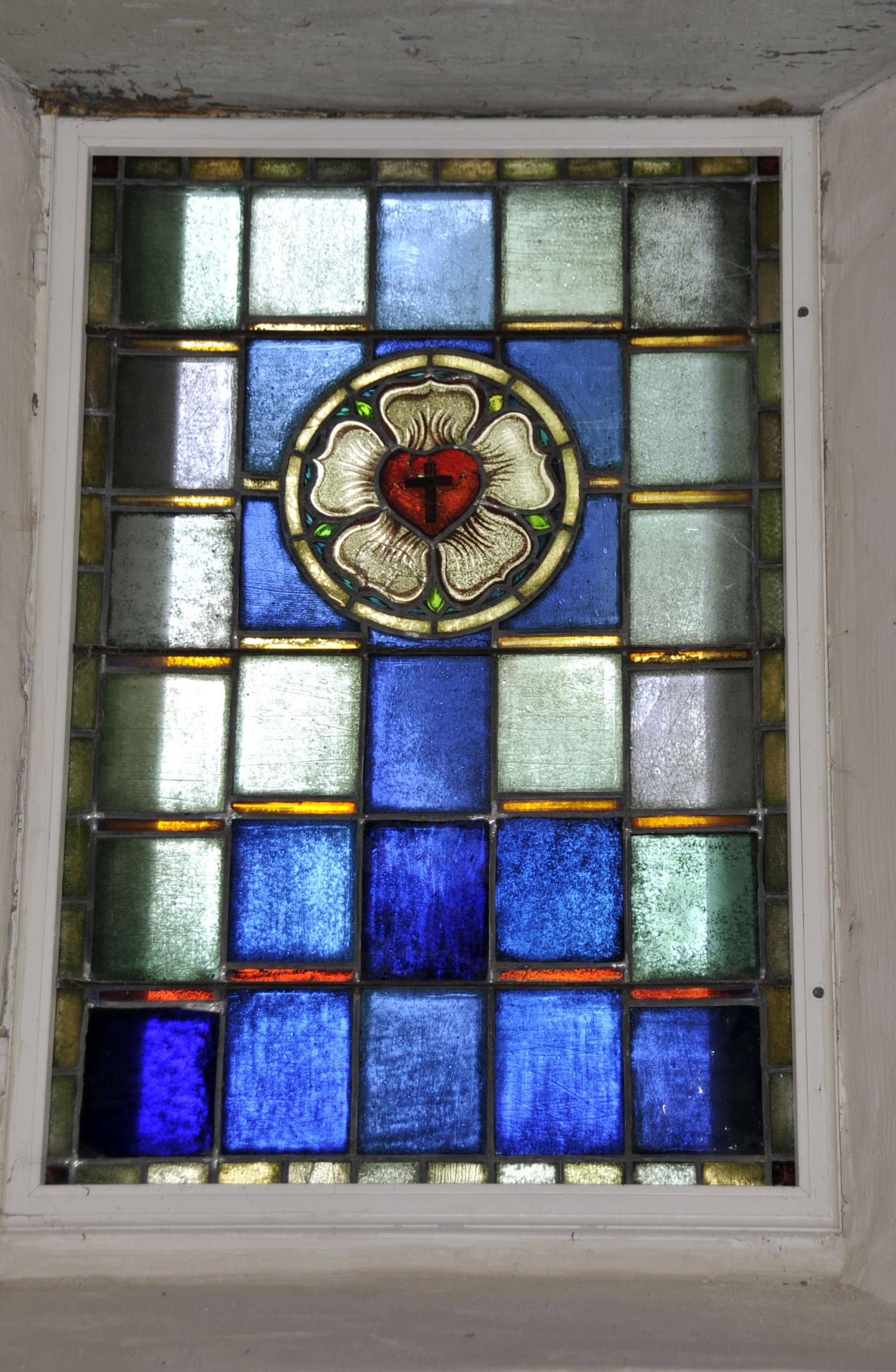
Luther's Seal from a church in Cobstädt, Thuringia, Germany

In an 8 July 1530 letter to Lazarus Spengler, Luther interprets his seal:

Grace and peace from the Lord. As you desire to know whether my painted seal, which you sent to me, has hit the mark, I shall answer most amiably and tell you my original thoughts and reason about why my seal is a symbol of my theology. The first should be a black cross in a heart, which retains its natural color, so that I myself would be reminded that faith in the Crucified saves us. "For one who believes from the heart will be justified" (Romans 10:10). Although it is indeed a black cross, which mortifies and which should also cause pain, it leaves the heart in its natural colour. It does not corrupt nature, that is, it does not kill but keeps alive. "The just shall live by faith" (Romans 1:17) but by faith in the crucified. Such a heart should stand in the middle of a white rose, to show that faith gives joy, comfort, and peace. In other words, it places the believer into a white, joyous rose, for this faith does not give peace and joy like the world gives (John 14:27). That is why the rose should be white and not red, for white is the color of the spirits and the angels (cf. Matthew 28:3; John 20:12). Such a rose should stand in a sky-blue field, symbolising that such joy in spirit and faith is a beginning of the heavenly future joy, which begins already, but is grasped in hope, not yet revealed. And around this field is a golden ring, symbolising that such blessedness in Heaven lasts forever and has no end. Such blessedness is exquisite, beyond all joy and goods, just as gold is the most valuable, most precious and best metal. This is my compendium theologiae [summary of theology]. I have wanted to show it to you in good friendship, hoping for your appreciation. May Christ, our beloved Lord, be with your spirit until the life hereafter. Amen.

== In Byzantine Rite Lutheranism ==
The Luther Rose as used by the Ukrainian Lutheran Church, which is a part of Byzantine Rite Lutheranism.

Churches of Byzantine Rite Lutheranism, such as the Ukrainian Lutheran Church, use the Luther rose with a three-barred Orthodox cross in the centre.

== Use in coats of arms ==
The Luther rose is used in many coats of arms. The assumption that Martin Luther had visited any of these places is not confirmed.

=== German and Austrian arms ===
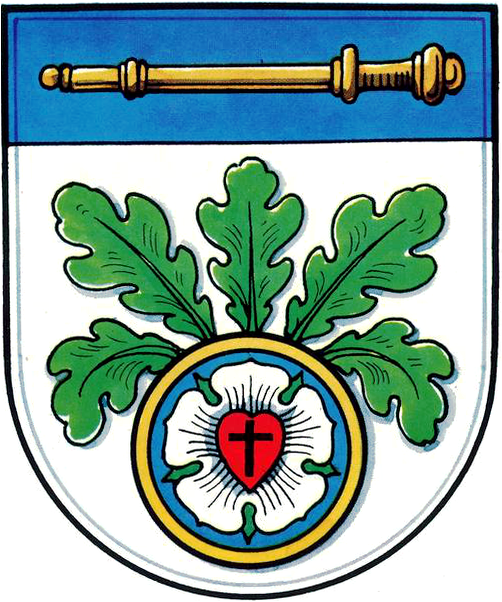
Langenholtensen

Kirchberg-Thening

Rodgau

Wain

Neuendettelsau

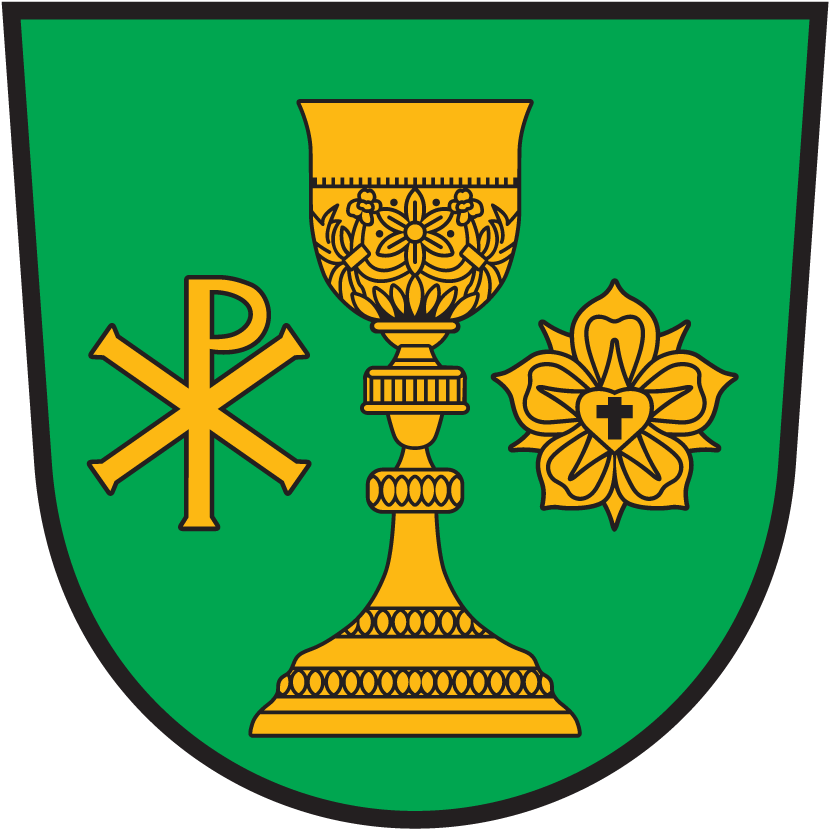
Golden Luther rose in the coat of arms of Arriach village

Ramsau am Dachstein

Greifenstein

== Use in United States Department of Veterans Affairs ==
The Luther Rose is number 51 in the USVA Emblems of Belief.

United States Department of Veterans Affairs headstone emblem 51

== See also ==
- Rose (heraldry) – Heraldic symbol
- Rose Cross – Western esoteric symbol
- Rose symbolism

== Bibliography ==
- Luther, Martin. D. Martin Luthers Werke, Kritische Gesamtausgabe. Briefwechsel. 18 vols. Weimar: Verlag Hermann Böhlaus Nachfolger, 1930–85. (abbreviated as WABr above).
- Luther, Martin. Luther's Works. 55 Volumes. Various translators. St. Louis: Concordia Publishing House; Minneapolis: Fortress Press, 1957–1986. CD-ROM edition, 2001. (abbreviated as LW above).
