= Lazarus Spengler =

German hymnwriter (1479–1534)

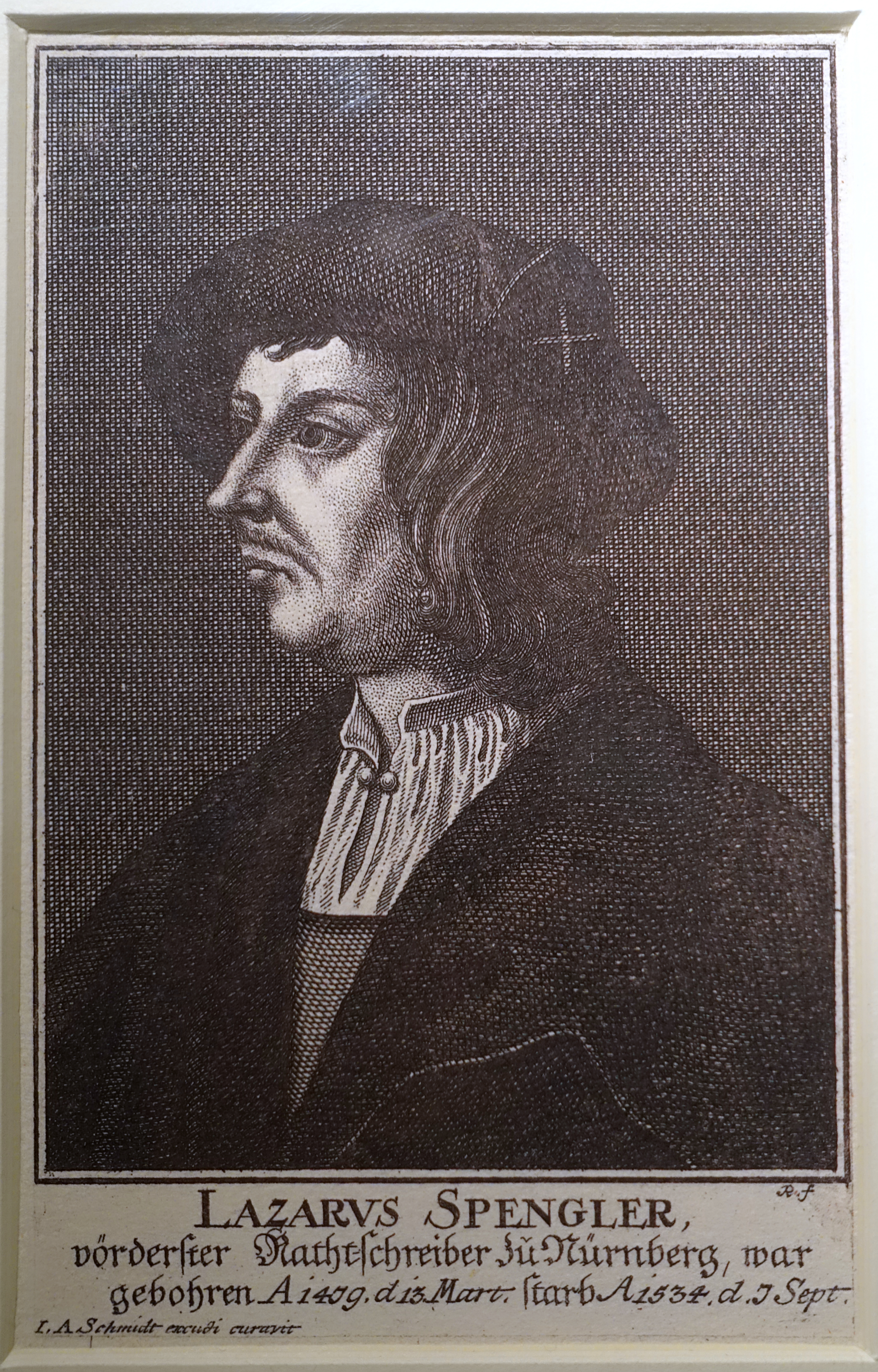
Lazarus Spengler

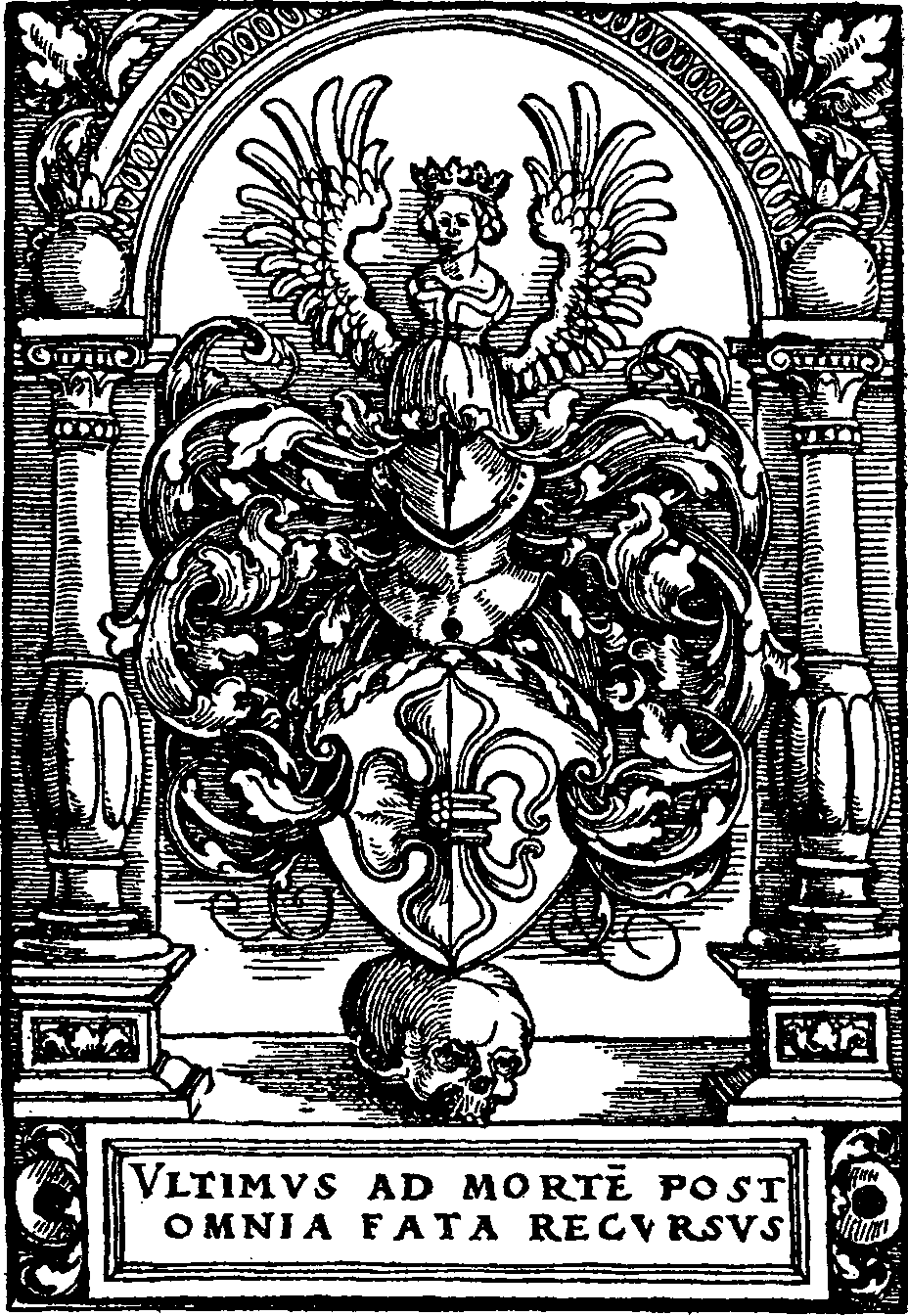
Albrecht Dürer: Bookplate for Lazarus Spengler (1515)

Lazarus Spengler (13 March 1479 in Nuremberg – 7 September 1534 in Nuremberg) was a prominent supporter of Martin Luther and leader of the Protestant Reformation in Nuremberg, as well as a famous hymnwriter.

== Life and career ==
Spengler was the son of Georg and Agnes Spengler, and he was the 9th of 21 children. His father was a clerk in the Imperial Court of Justice. Lazarus Spengler enrolled in the University of Leipzig in 1491. Upon the death of his father in 1496, Spengler returned to Nuremberg and obtained a position in the office of the Nuremberg town clerk (Raths Syndikus). In 1507, he became the town clerk.

He met Martin Luther in 1518, when Luther passed through Nuremberg. Spengler became an ardent supporter, publishing Schutzred supporting Luther in 1519. He was active in reforming the church in Nuremberg, which drew unfavorable attention from religious conservatives. Spengler was one of Luther's supporters mentioned by name in Pope Leo X's bull Exsurge Domine, issued on 15 June 1520, threatening to excommunicate Luther and his followers if they did not submit to the pope. With the support of the Nuremberg town council, Spengler refused to submit to the pope, and was subsequently excommunicated along with Luther by the pope on 3 January 1521, by the bull Decet Romanum Pontificem. In April 1521, Nuremberg sent Spengler as a delegate to the Diet of Worms.

Spengler and the Nuremberg town council continued to reform the church in Nuremberg throughout the 1520s, and in 1525, Spengler traveled to Wittenberg to consult Luther and Philipp Melanchthon about the possibility of converting the Benedictine Ägidienstift into a Protestant gymnasium. Luther and Melanchthon looked favorably on the proposal, and the gymnasium was opened by Melanchthon on 23 May 1526. In 1528, Spengler worked with the other reformers to convince the Elector of Saxony, John the Steadfast to authorize a canonical visitation, an activity that had previously been conducted exclusively by Roman Catholic bishops. Spengler participated in the negotiations at the Diet of Augsburg in 1530, where he was a vocal defender of strict Lutheranism.

He was largely responsible for the design of the Luther rose, adopted by Luther at the time of the Diet of Augsburg. He is also remembered as the author of several hymns, some of which remain in Lutheran hymn books to this day. One of these, "Durch Adams Fall ist ganz verderbt" (All Mankind Fell In Adam's Fall), is quoted in the Book of Concord, the official Lutheran confession.
