= Flags of Frisia =

Flag of the Interfrisian Council
- Proportion: 2:3
- Adopted: 2009
- Designed by: Interfrisian Council
- Interfrisian flag
- Use: Other
- Adopted: 23 September 2006
- Design: A blue-fimbriated white Nordic cross on a yellow field, with a slanted red Seeblatt in each quarter
- Designed by: Groep fan Auwerk

The flags of Frisia are the flags that are used to represent (the subdivisions of) Frisia, a cross-border cultural region in Northwestern Europe. Some designs are in official use on a local or provincial level, while others are used unofficially on a regional, linguistic or international level.

== Interfrisian flag ==
As of today, two designs for an "Interfrisian flag" have been proposed. The first design was created in 2006 by the Groep fan Auwerk and is based on the flags of Norway and Iceland. In 2009, an alternative design was adopted by the Interfrisian Council, featuring elements of the flags of its three sections: North, East and West Frisia.

== Subdivisions ==
=== West Frisia ===
Flag of Friesland

Flag of the Ommelanden

Flag of West Friesland

=== East Frisia ===
Flag of East Frisia, adopted in 1989

Flag of East Frisia with coat of arms

Flag of Landkreis Friesland

Flag of Saterland

Unofficial flag of the Butjadingen peninsula

Flag of Land Wursten

==== Lordship of Kniphausen ====
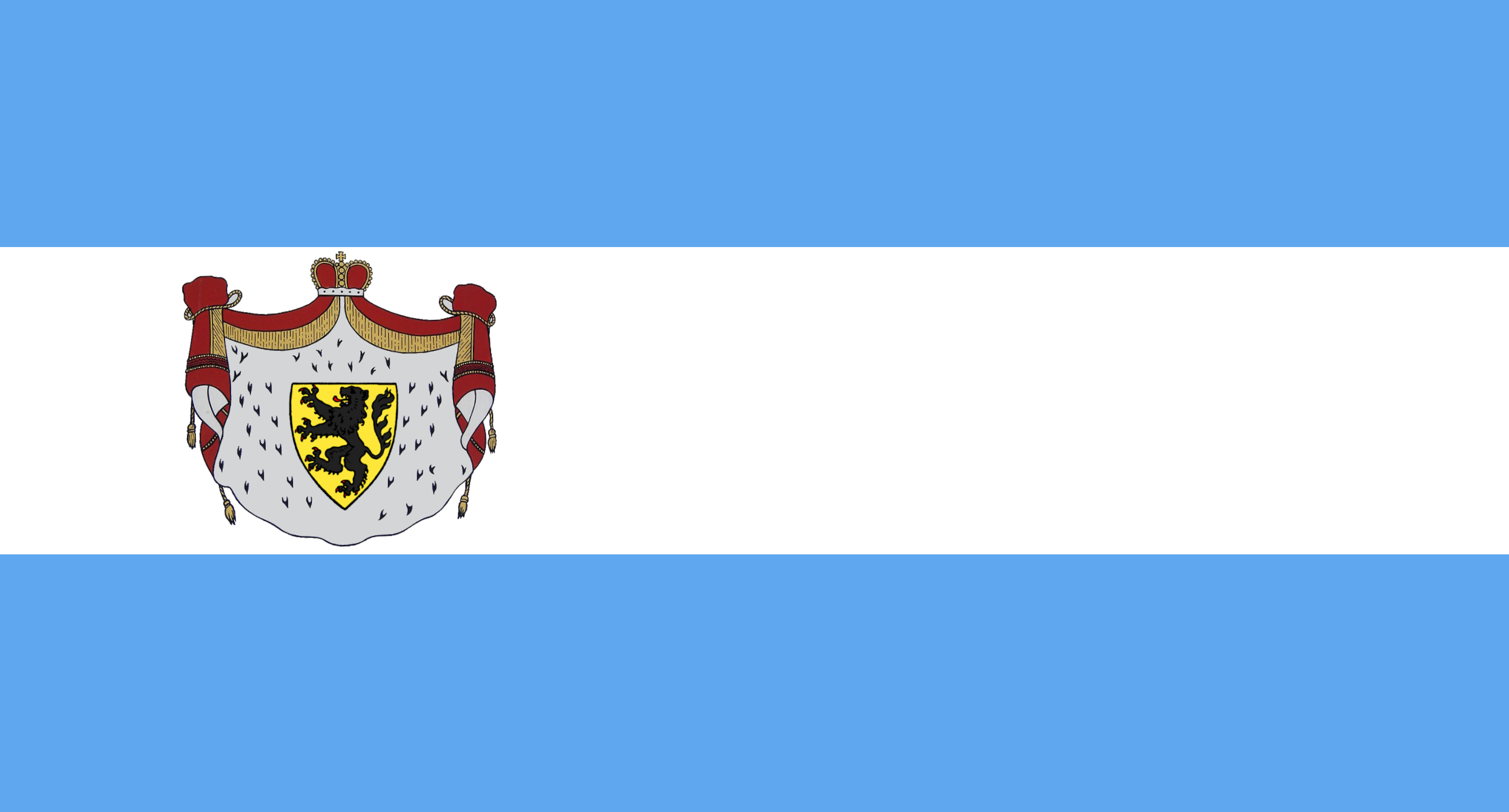
Flag of the Lordship of Kniphausen (pre-1835)

Flag of the Lordship of Kniphausen (1702–1751)

Banner of the Lordship of Kniphausen (1689–1702)

=== North Frisia ===
Flag of North Frisia

Flag of North Frisia with coat of arms

Flag of Kreis Nordfriesland

Alternative Nordic cross flag of North Frisia

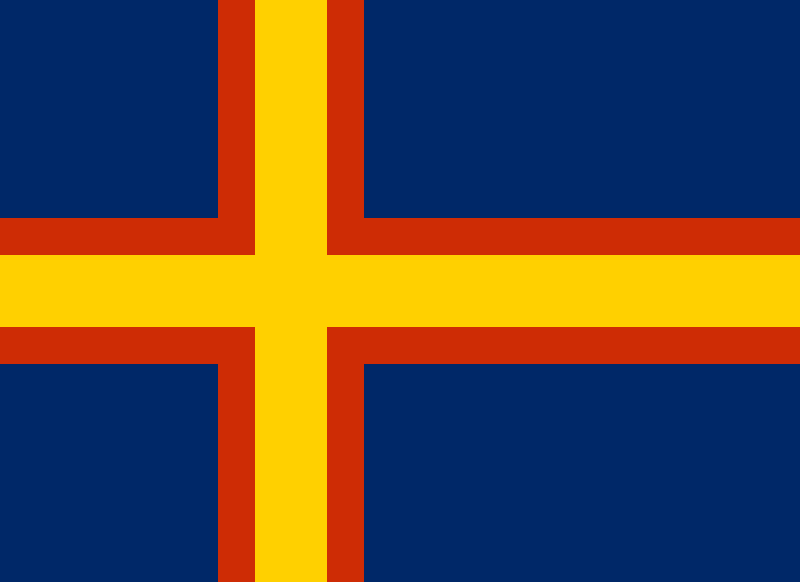
Alternative Nordic cross flag of North Frisia

Flag of Heligoland

== Gallery ==
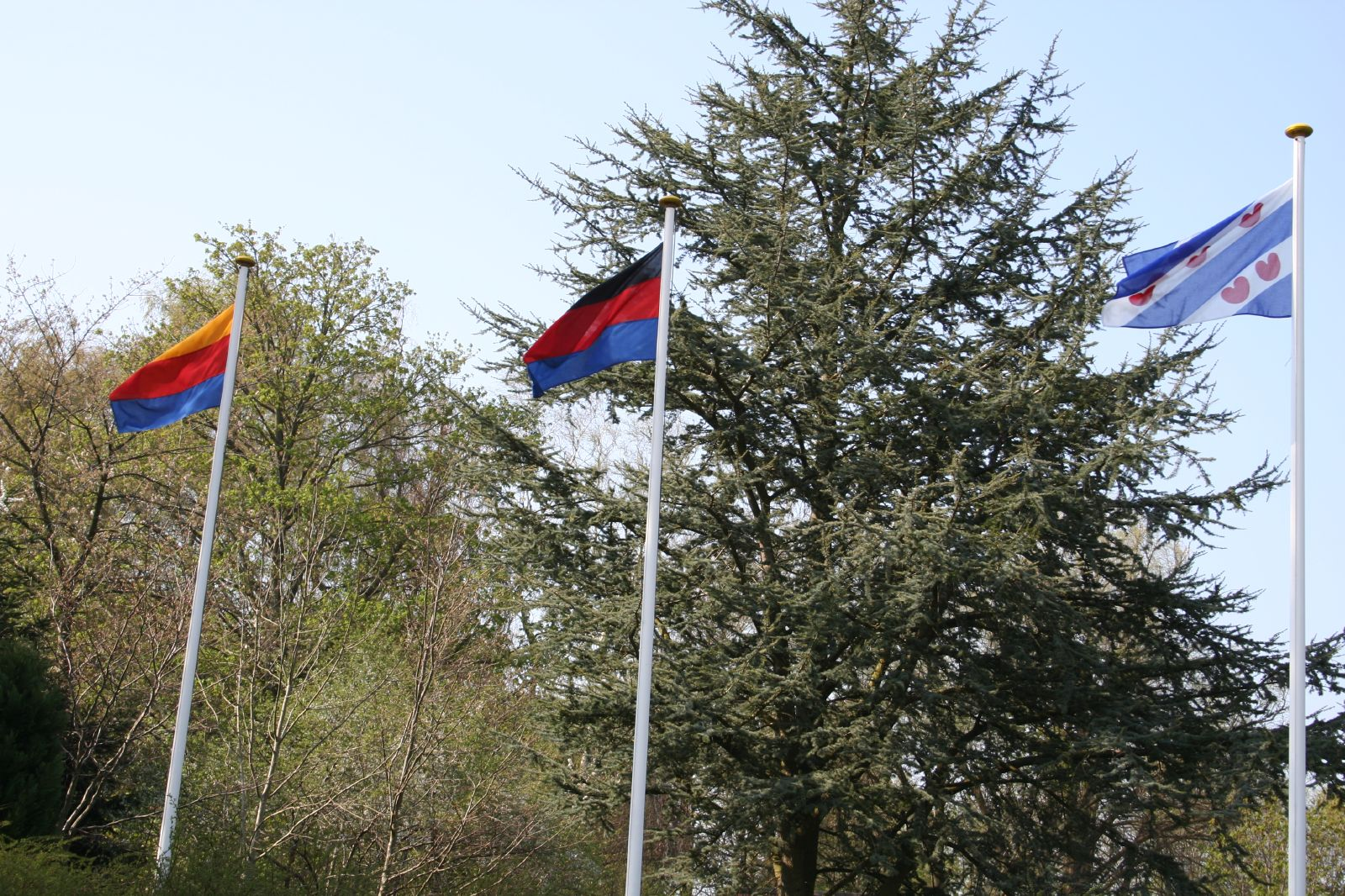
The flags of North, East and West Frisia

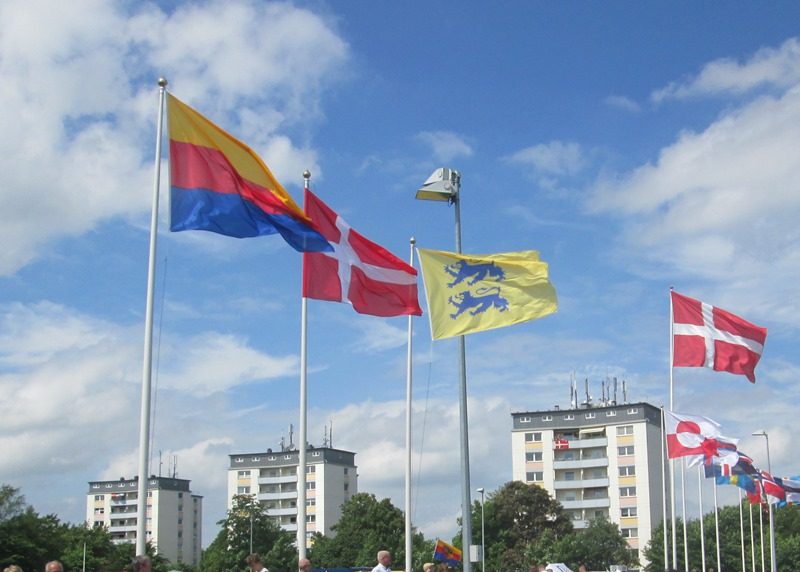
The flags of North Frisia, Denmark and Southern Schleswig Danes

== See also ==
- Flag of Friesland
- Frisian eagle
- Seeblatt
