= Frisian flag =

'Frisian flag' can refer to:

- Any flag associated with the greater region of Frisia; see Frisia#Flag or Flags of Frisia
  - Specifically, the modern flag of the Dutch province of Friesland (Fryslân)
- A Dutch (Friesche Vlag) and Indonesian (Frisian Flag) dairy brand of FrieslandCampina, using the Frisian flag as symbol
- Exercise Frisian Flag, a NATO exercise (that is similar to Red Flag and Maple Flag) flown since 1999 from Leeuwarden Airbase in Fryslân, the Netherlands.
