= Flag of Friesland =

Friesland
- Use: Provincial flag
- Proportion: 9:13 (de facto 2:3)
- Adopted: 9 July 1957
- Design: The flag consists of four blue and three white diagonal stripes; the white stripes filling with a total of seven red pompeblêden.

The flag of Friesland (West Frisian: Flagge fan Fryslân; Dutch: Vlag Fryslân) is the official flag of the Dutch province of Friesland. The flag was officially adopted by the provincial executive of Friesland on 9 July 1957.

It consists of four blue and three white diagonal stripes; in the white stripes are a total of seven red seeblatts (or pompeblêden, as they are called in West Frisian), leaves of the yellow water-lily, that may resemble hearts, but according to the official instructions "should not be heart-shaped".

The Frisian flag is probably the best known and most recognizable Dutch provincial flag. It flies abundantly during (inter)national skating competitions and is also used by one of the largest and oldest dairy producers. Moreover, the design is the basis of the home jerseys of the football clubs SC Heerenveen and the Blauhúster Dakkapel.

== Symbolism ==
The seven red pompeblêden are a reference to the Frisian "sea countries" in the Middle Ages: independent regions along the coast from Alkmaar to the Weser who were allied against the Vikings. There were never precisely seven distinct regions, but the number seven probably has the connotation "many." Some sources hold, however, that there have been seven Frisian lands: West Friesland, Westergoa, Eastergoa, Hunsingo, Fivelingo, Emsingo, and Jeverland.

The pompeblêden are used in other related flags such as the flag of the Ommelanden in neighbouring Groningen Province, a historically Frisian area, and for a proposed pan-Frisia flag put forth by the Groep fan Auwerk.

== History ==
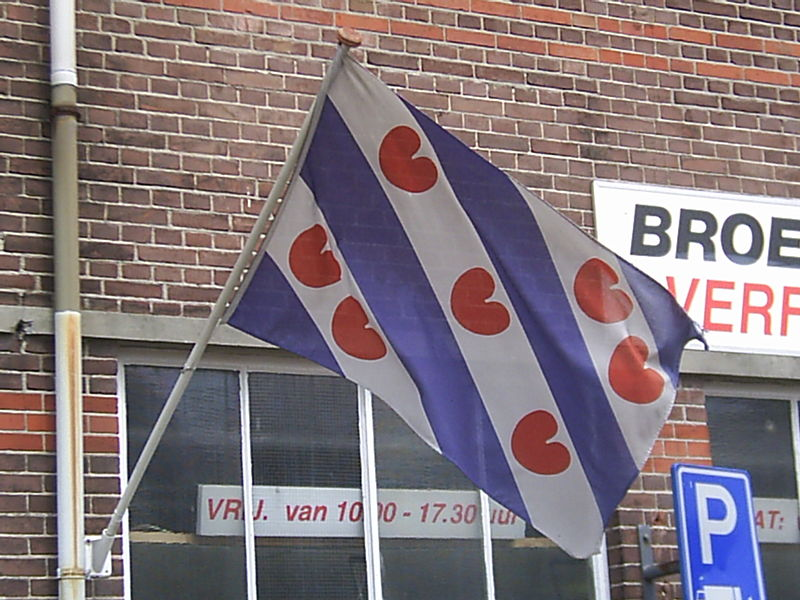
Flag of Friesland on a pole

In the 13th century, a flag with pompeblêden is described in the Middle High German epic poem Gudrunlied:

Noch ſihe ich hie bî weiben einen vanen breit
von wolkenblâwen ſîden. daȥ ſi iu geſeit:
den bringet uns her Herwîc dâ her von Sêlande.
ſêbleter ſwebent dar inne...

[There I see uplifted a flag outspreading wide;
Of sky-blue silk 'tis woven. The truth I will not hide;
Herwic bears this banner, he in the Sealands dwelling.
Sea-leaves are shown upon it...]

15th century books on heraldry show that two armorial bearings were derived from the early ones: a coat of arms showing lions and seven pompeblêden (water lilies) transformed into billets, the other being the arms with the seven now known lilies on stripes.

The current design was officially approved in 1897 and was first used by the provincial government in 1927. The flag was officially adopted by the provincial executive of Friesland on 9 July 1957.

== See also ==
- Flags of Frisia
