= Coat of arms of Groningen (province) =

- Armiger: Province of Groningen
- Adopted: 1595 (unofficially); 1947 (officially)
- Crest: Golden coronet
- Shield: Escutcheon of the city Groningen in the first and fourth quarter and escutcheon of the Ommelanden in the second and third quarter
- Supporters: Two rampant golden lions

The coat of arms of Groningen (Dutch: wapen van Groningen) is an official symbol of the province. It was designed when the region was united in 1595 and formally approved in 1947 by Queen Wilhelmina. The coat of arms consists of two lions supporting a crowned shield which is decorated with the shields of the city of Groningen and of the Ommelanden.

== History ==
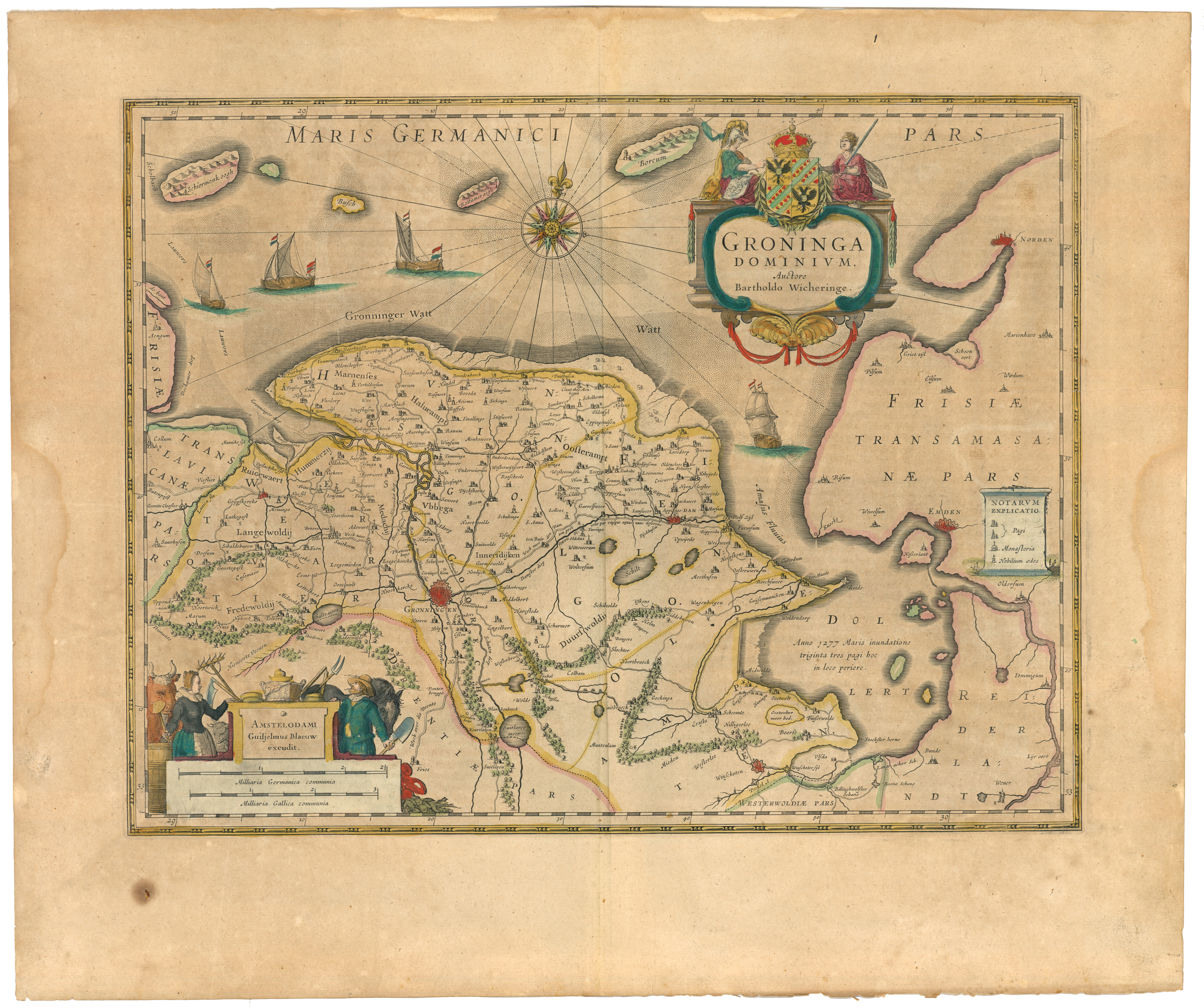
Map of the domain of Groningen in the Theatrum Orbis Terrarum, sive, Atlas Novus (1645) with the shield of the province of Groningen above the map title

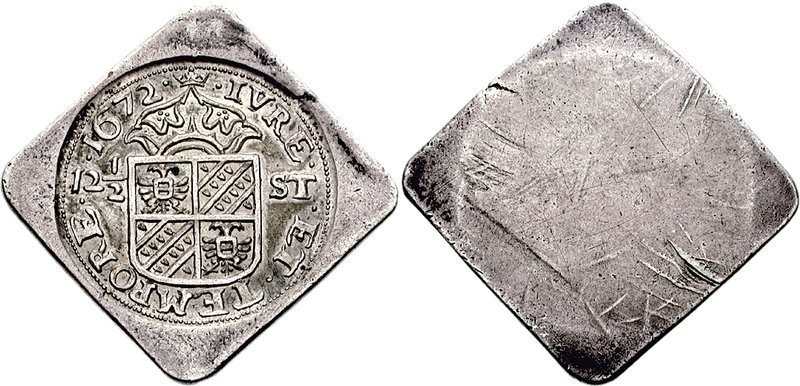
12½ stuivers with the crowned shield of Groningen coined in 1672

In 1595, the city of Groningen and the Ommelanden or surrounding regions come to an agreement to form a united domain (Dutch: gewest). The city already had direct control over the regions Gorecht, Oldambt, Reiderland, and Westerwolde. The Ommelanden were Hunsingo, Fivelingo, and Westerkwartier. A new coat of arms was designed for the domain. More than 350 years later, on 30 December 1947, the coat of arms was formally approved by royal decree of Queen Wilhelmina.

== Heraldic elements ==
In the coat of arms of the province of Groningen, the escutcheon or heraldic shield is a combination of the escutcheon of the city of Groningen in the first and fourth quarter and the escutcheon of the Ommelanden in the second and third quarter.

The escutcheon of the city of Groningen has a golden field with a black double-headed eagle with on its chest another escutcheon with a silver field and a green fess.

The escutcheon of the Ommelanden has a silver field with three diagonal blue bendlets, representing the three regions, and eleven red heart-shaped charges ("pompeblêd"), representing the eleven subregions.

The other elements are a golden coronet or heraldic crown with five leaves and four pearls, and two rampant golden lions supporting the main escutcheon. The lions represent the Netherlands.

== Restricted use ==
The province of Groningen states that the coat of arms may only be used non-commercially.
