= Candock =

Candock may refer to:

- branching species of Equisetum, or Horsetail
- Nuphar lutea, the yellow water-lily
