= Seeblatt =

Heraldic figure

Seeblatt bendwise sinister

Seeblatt ([ˈzeː.blat], German for 'lake leaf', plural Seeblätter; Danish: søblad; West Frisian: pompeblêd; East Frisian: Pupkeblad) is the term for the stylized leaf of a water lily, used as a charge in heraldry.

== Background ==
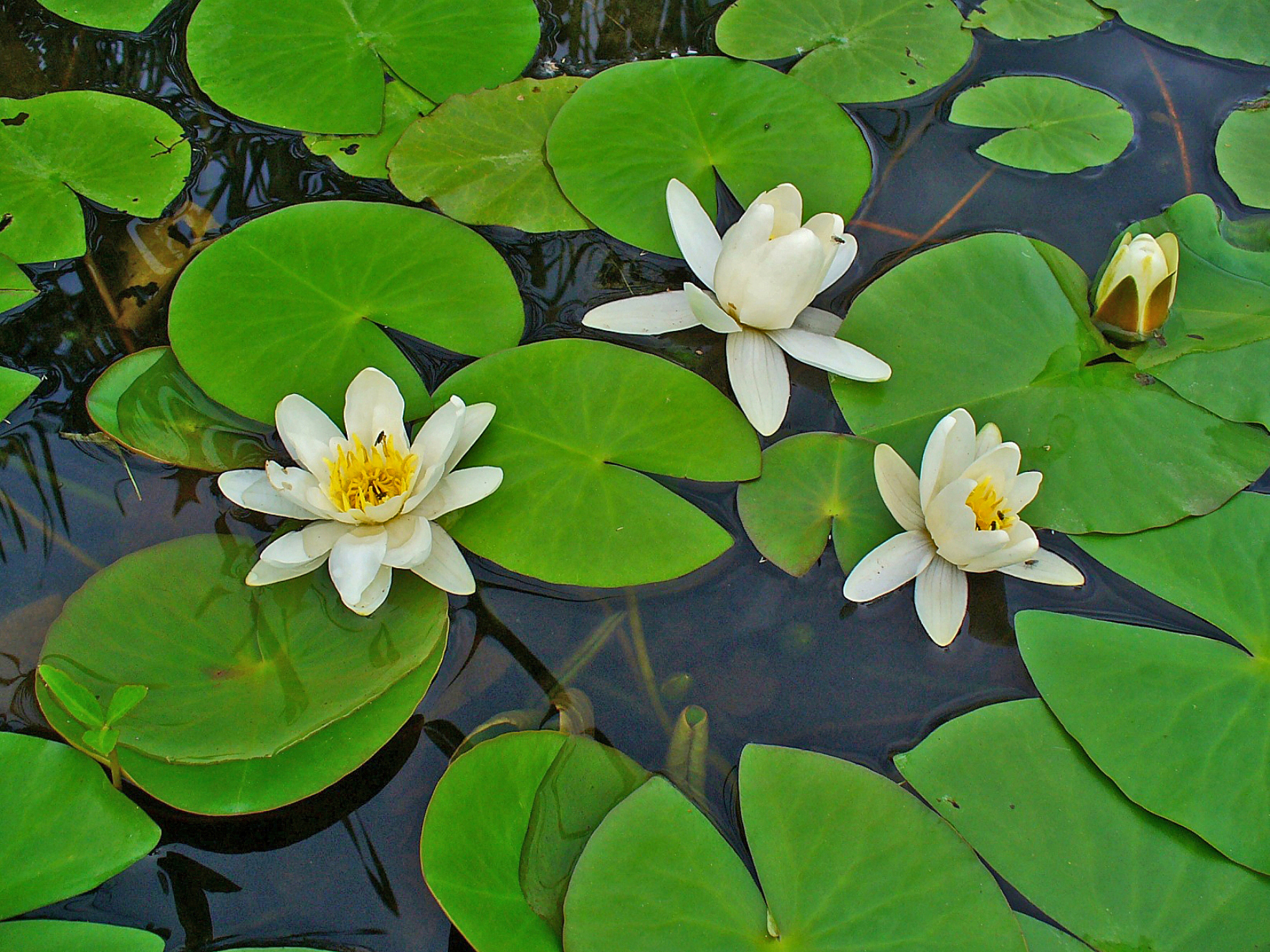
The natural water lily leaf

This charge is used in the heraldry of Germany, the Netherlands and Scandinavia, but not so much in France and Britain. Seeblätter feature prominently on the coat of arms of Denmark as well as on Danish coins.

In West Frisian, the term pompeblêd is used. The name is used to indicate the seven red lily leaf-shaped blades on the Frisian flag. The seven red pompeblêden (leaves of the yellow water lily and the European white waterlily) refer to the medieval Frisian 'sea districts': more or less autonomous regions along the Southern North Sea coast from the city of Alkmaar to the Weser River. There never have been exactly seven of these administrative units; the number of seven bears the suggestion of 'a lot'. Late medieval sources identify seven Frisian districts, though with different names. The most important regions were West Friesland, Westergo, Oostergo, Hunsingo, Fivelingo, Reiderland, Emsingo, Brokmerland, Harlingerland and Rüstringen (Jeverland and Butjadingen).

== Gallery ==
The Frisian flag

The Coat of arms of Groningen

Tecklenburg, Germany

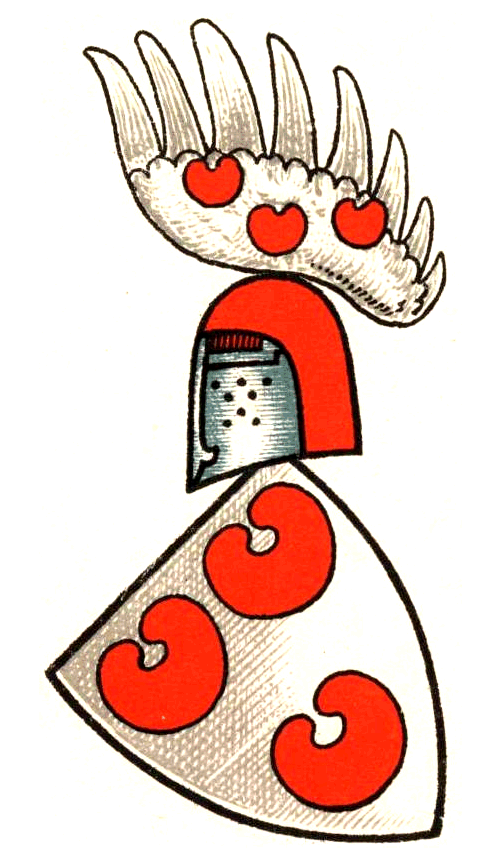
Original arms of the German counts of Tecklenburg

Flag of the Interfrisian Council

== See also ==
- Flag of Friesland
- Heart symbol
- Cardioid, a geometrical curve resembling the outline of a seeblatt
- SC Heerenveen, Dutch football club whose home kit features seven lily-shaped blades
