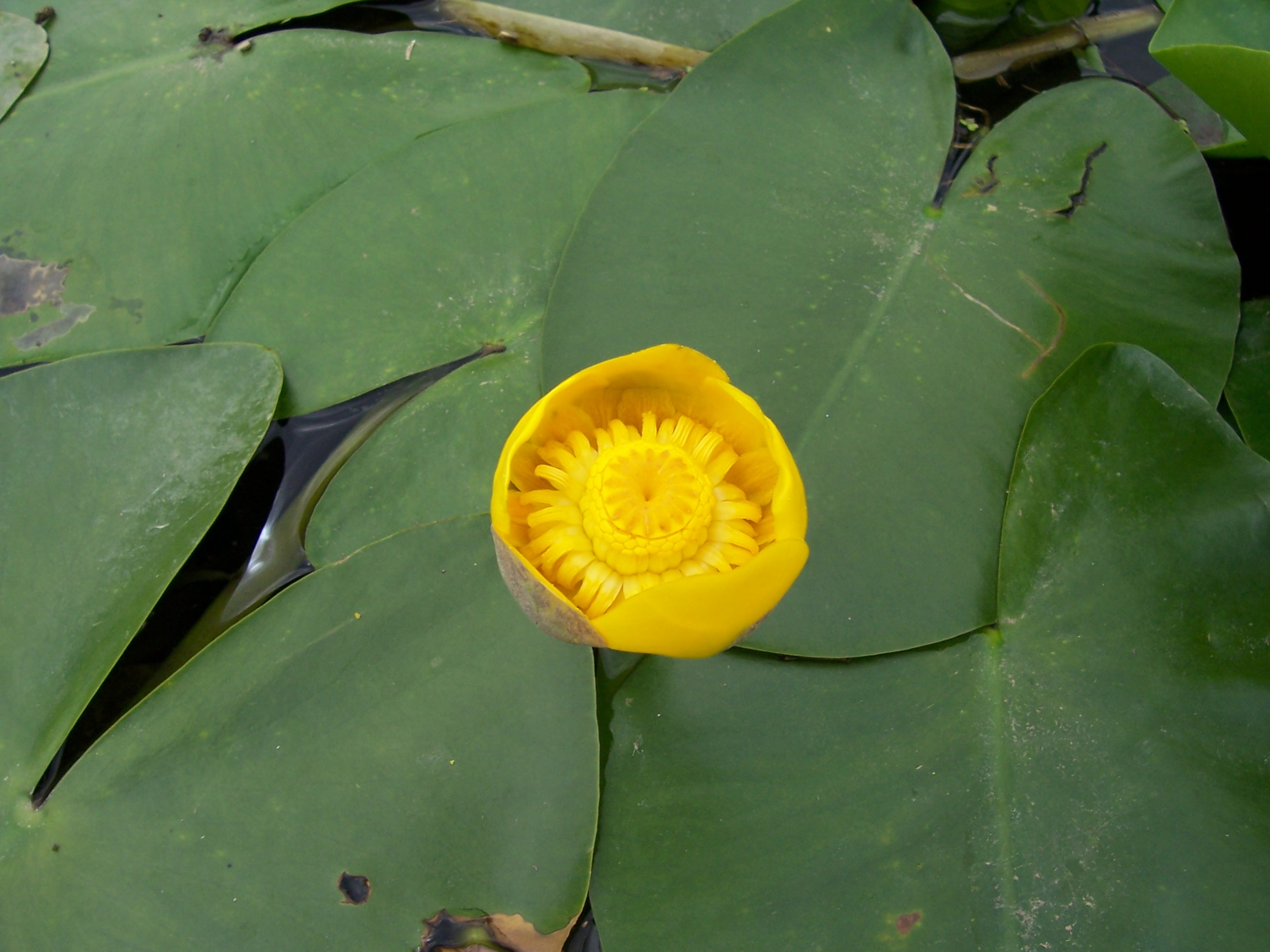
- Nuphar lutea

Conservation status
- Least Concern (IUCN 3.1)

Scientific classification
- Kingdom: Plantae
- Clade: Embryophytes
- Clade: Tracheophytes
- Clade: Spermatophytes
- Clade: Angiosperms
- Order: Nymphaeales
- Family: Nymphaeaceae
- Genus: Nuphar
- Section: Nuphar sect. Nuphar
- Species: N. lutea

Binomial name
- Nuphar lutea (L.) Sm.
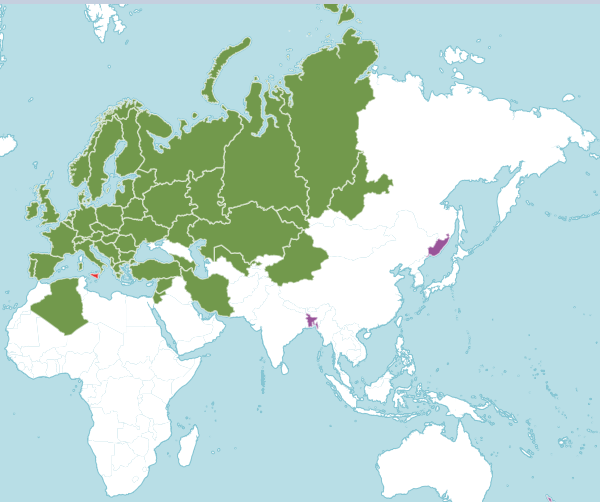
- *Green: native: Red: native but extinct (Sicily); Purple: introduced

Synonyms
- List: Nenuphar luteum (L.) Link; Nymphaea lutea L.; Nymphona lutea (L.) Bubani; Nymphozanthus europaeus Desv.; Nymphozanthus luteus (L.) Fernald; Nuphar affinis Harz; Nuphar fluviatile Laest.; Nuphar grandiflora Laest.; Nuphar grandifolia Laest.; Nuphar graveolens Laest.; Nuphar latifolia Laest.; Nuphar latifolia subsp. boreale Laest.; Nuphar lobata Laest.; Nuphar lutea var. rivularis (Dumort.) De Wild. & T.Durand; Nuphar lutea var. submersa Rouy & Foucaud; Nuphar rivularis Dumort.; Nuphar sericea Láng; Nuphar spathulifera Rchb.; Nuphar systyla Wallr.; Nuphar tenella Rchb.; Nymphaea affinis (Harz) Hayek; Nymphaea lutea var. affinis (Harz) J.Schust.; Nymphaea lutea subf. denticulata J.Schust.; Nymphaea lutea var. harzii J.Schust.; Nymphaea lutea var. minor Lej.; Nymphaea lutea var. puberula J.Schust.; Nymphaea lutea f. punctata J.Schust.; Nymphaea lutea f. purpureosignata J.Schust.; Nymphaea lutea f. schlierensis J.Schust.; Nymphaea lutea f. sericea J.Schust.; Nymphaea lutea f. submersa J.Schust.; Nymphaea lutea f. tenella (Rchb.) J.Schust.; Nymphaea lutea f. terrestris J.Schust.; Nymphaea lutea f. urceolata J.Schust.; Nymphaea umbilicalis Salisb.; Nymphozanthus affinis (Harz) Fernald; Nymphozanthus sericeus (Láng) Fernald; Nymphozanthus vulgaris Rich.

= Nuphar lutea =

Species of flowering plant

Nuphar lutea, the yellow water-lily, is an aquatic plant of the family Nymphaeaceae, native to northern temperate and some subtropical regions of Europe, northwest Africa, and western Asia. This species was used as a food source and in medicinal practices from prehistoric times with potential research and medical applications going forward.

== Description ==
=== Vegetative characteristics ===
Nuphar lutea is an aquatic, rhizomatous, perennial herb with stout, branching, spongy, 3–8(–15) cm wide rhizomes. It has floating and submerged leaves. The broadly elliptic to ovate, green, leathery floating leaf with an entire margin, a deep sinus and spreading basal lobes is 16–30 cm long, and 11.5–22.1 cm wide. The adaxial surface is glabrous, and the abaxial surface is glabrous or pubescent. The trigonous petiole is 3–10 mm wide. The very thin submerged leaf with undulate margins has short petioles.

=== Generative characteristics ===
The fragrant, solitary, yellow, subglobose, 30–65 mm wide, floating or emergent flowers have 4–10 mm wide, glabrous to pubescent peduncles. The 5(–6) yellow, broadly ovate to orbicular sepals with a rounded apex are 2–3 cm long. The 11–20 obovate inconspicuous petals with a rounded apex are 7.5–23 mm long. The androecium consists of numerous stamens with 4–7 mm long, yellow anthers. The sulcate, spheroidal pollen grains are 26–50 μm long. The gynoecium consists of 5-20 carpels. The stigmatic disk with an entire margin is 7–19 mm wide. The urceolate, green, 2.6–4.5 cm long, and 1.9–3.4 cm wide fruit, which is enclosed in persistent sepals, bears up to 400 ovoid, olive green, 3.5–5 mm long, and 3.5 mm wide seeds.

=== Cytology ===
The chromosome count is 2n = 34.

== Taxonomy ==
It was first described by Carl Linnaeus as Nymphaea lutea L. in 1753. Later, it was transferred to genus Nuphar Sm. as Nuphar lutea (L.) Sm. by James Edward Smith in 1809. It is the type species of its genus. It is placed in the section Nuphar sect. Nuphar.

=== Species delimitation ===
Some botanists have treated Nuphar lutea as the sole species in Nuphar, including all the other species in it as subspecies and giving the species a holarctic range, but the genus is now more usually divided into 8–15 species (see Nuphar for details).

=== Etymology ===
The specific epithet lutea, from the Latin luteus, means deep yellow or golden yellow.

== Ecology ==
=== Habitat ===
Habitat for Nuphar lutea ranges widely from moving to stagnant waters of "shallow lakes, ponds, swamps, river and stream margins, canals, ditches, and tidal reaches of freshwater streams"; alkaline to acidic waters; and sea level to mountainous lakes up to 3,000 metres in altitude. The species is less tolerant of water pollution than water-lilies in the genus Nymphaea. This aquatic plant grows in shallow water and wetlands, with its roots in the sediment and its leaves floating on the water surface; it can grow in water up to 5 metres deep. It is usually found in shallower water than the white water-lily, and often in beaver ponds. Since the flooded soils are deficient in oxygen, aerenchyma in the leaves and rhizome transport oxygen from the atmosphere to the rhizome roots. Often there is mass flow from the young leaves into the rhizome, and out through the older leaves. This "ventilation mechanism" has become the subject of research because of this species' substantial benefit to the surrounding ecosystem by "exhaling" methane gas from lake sediments.

=== Herbivory ===
Nuphar lutea plant colonies in turn are affected by organisms that eat its leaves, stems, and roots, including birds, deer, elk, and more. The water-lily leaf beetle, Galerucella nymphaeae, spends its entire life cycle around various Nuphar species, exposing leaf tissue to microbial attack and loss of floating ability.

As with other species in the order Nymphaeales, Nuphar lutea provides habitat for fish and a wide range of aquatic invertebrates, insects, snails, birds, crayfish, deer, and beaver in shallow waters along lake, pond, and stream margins.

== Distribution and habitat ==
Nuphar lutea is native to the region spanning from Europe to Siberia, Xinjiang, China, and North Algeria. It is extinct in Sicily, Italy. It has been introduced to Bangladesh, New Zealand, and the Russian region Primorye.

== Conservation status ==
The IUCN conservation status is Least Concern (LC).

== Uses ==
=== Horticulture ===
It is cultivated as an ornamental plant.

=== Food ===
Nuphar lutea is used as food.

=== Symbolism ===
Stylised red leaves of the yellow water-lily, known as seeblatts or pompeblêden are used as a symbol of Frisia. The flag of the Dutch province of Friesland features seven pompeblêden. Stone masons carved forms of the flowers on the roof bosses of Bristol Cathedral and Westminster Abbey, these are thought to encourage celibacy.

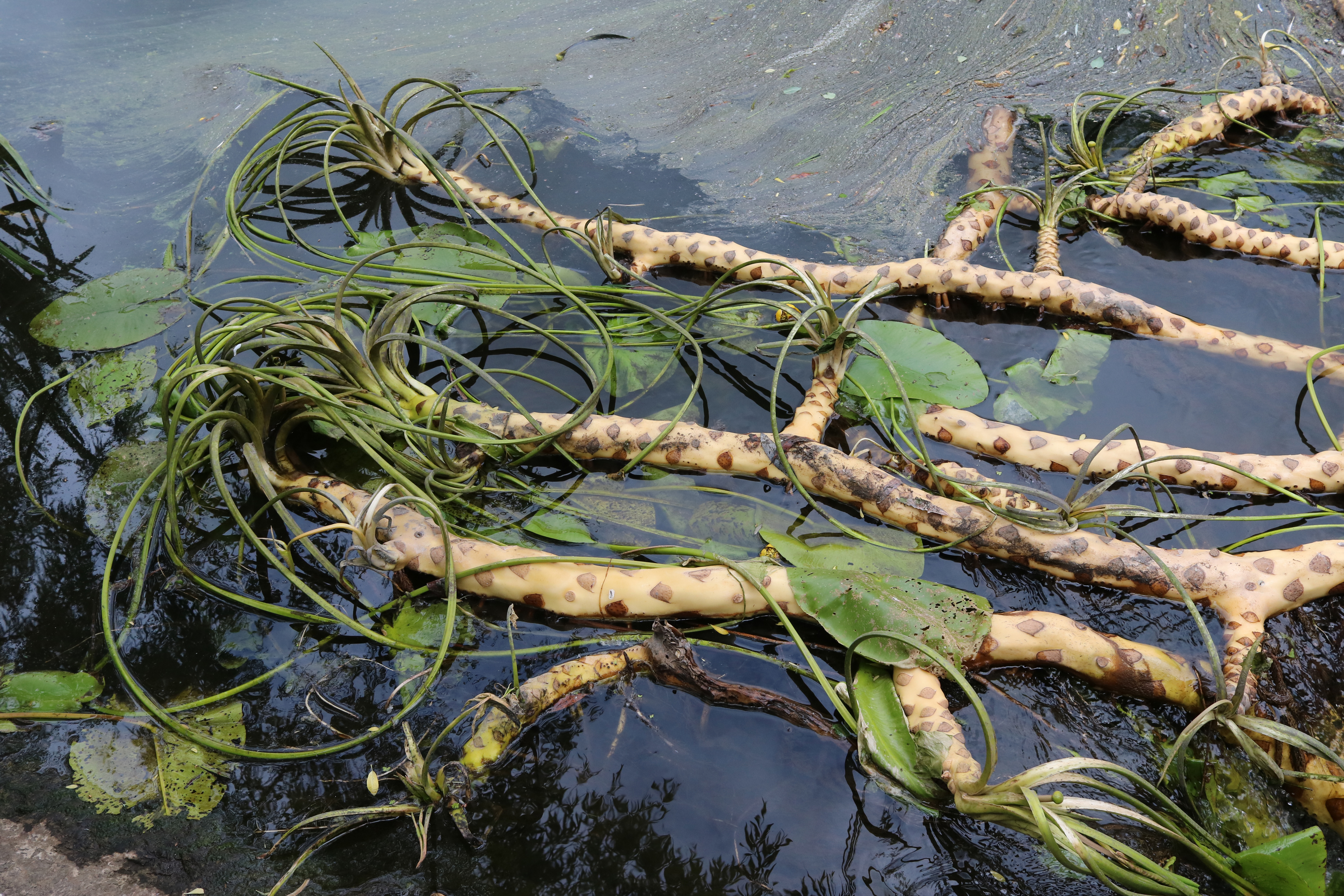
Branching rhizomes of Nuphar lutea

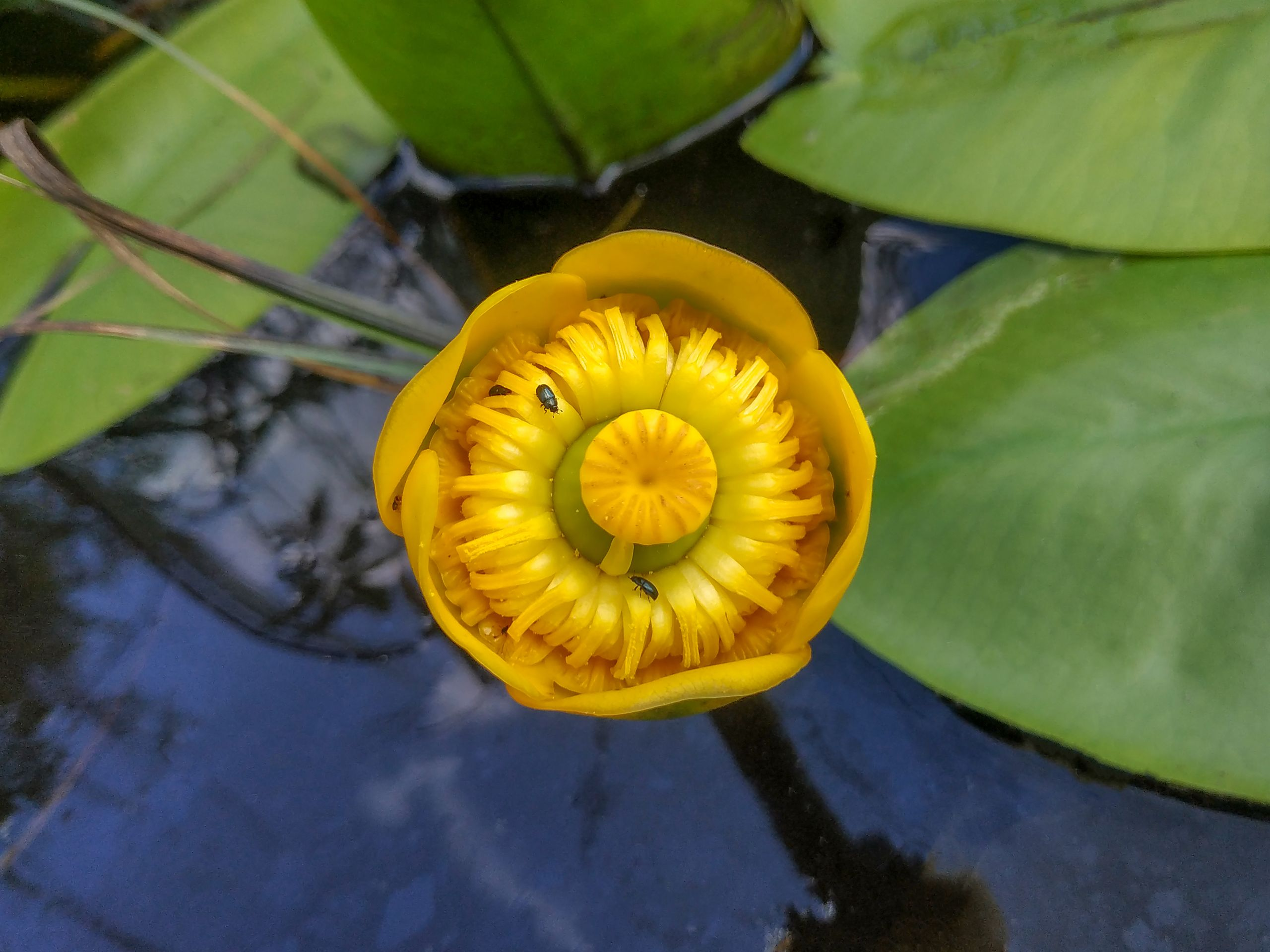
Nuphar lutea flower

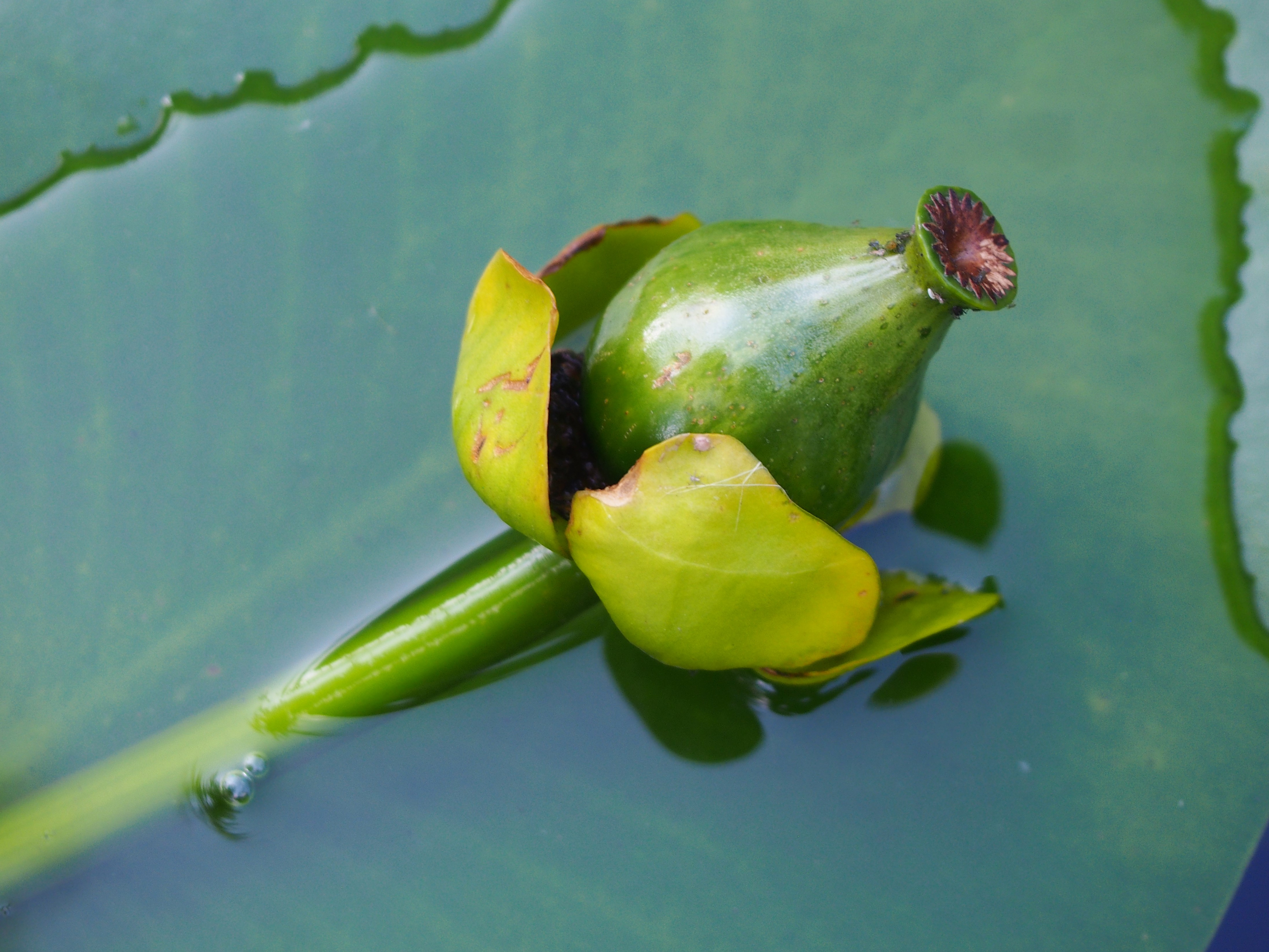
Nuphar lutea fruit with persistent sepals

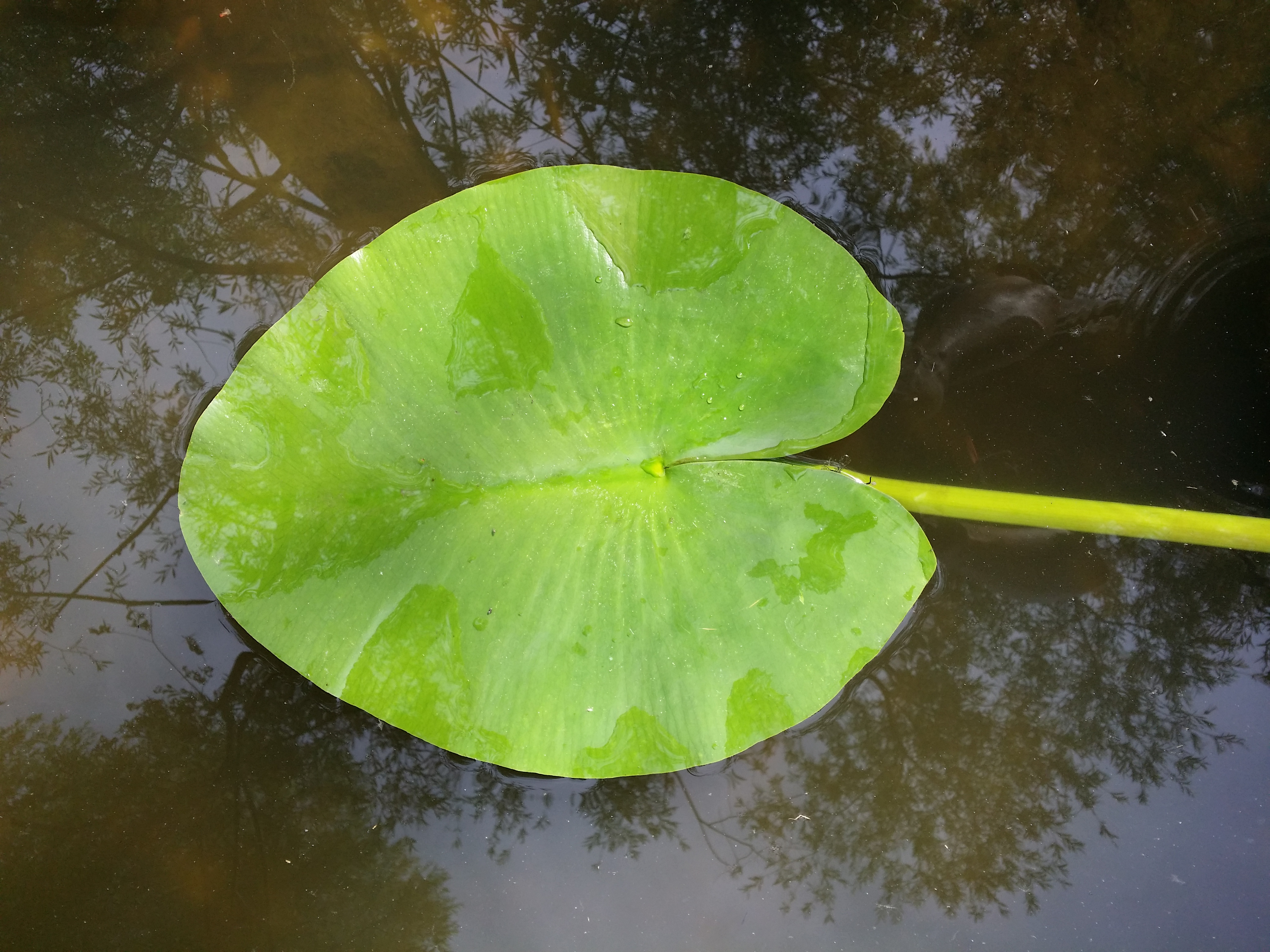
Upper leaf surface of a floating leaf

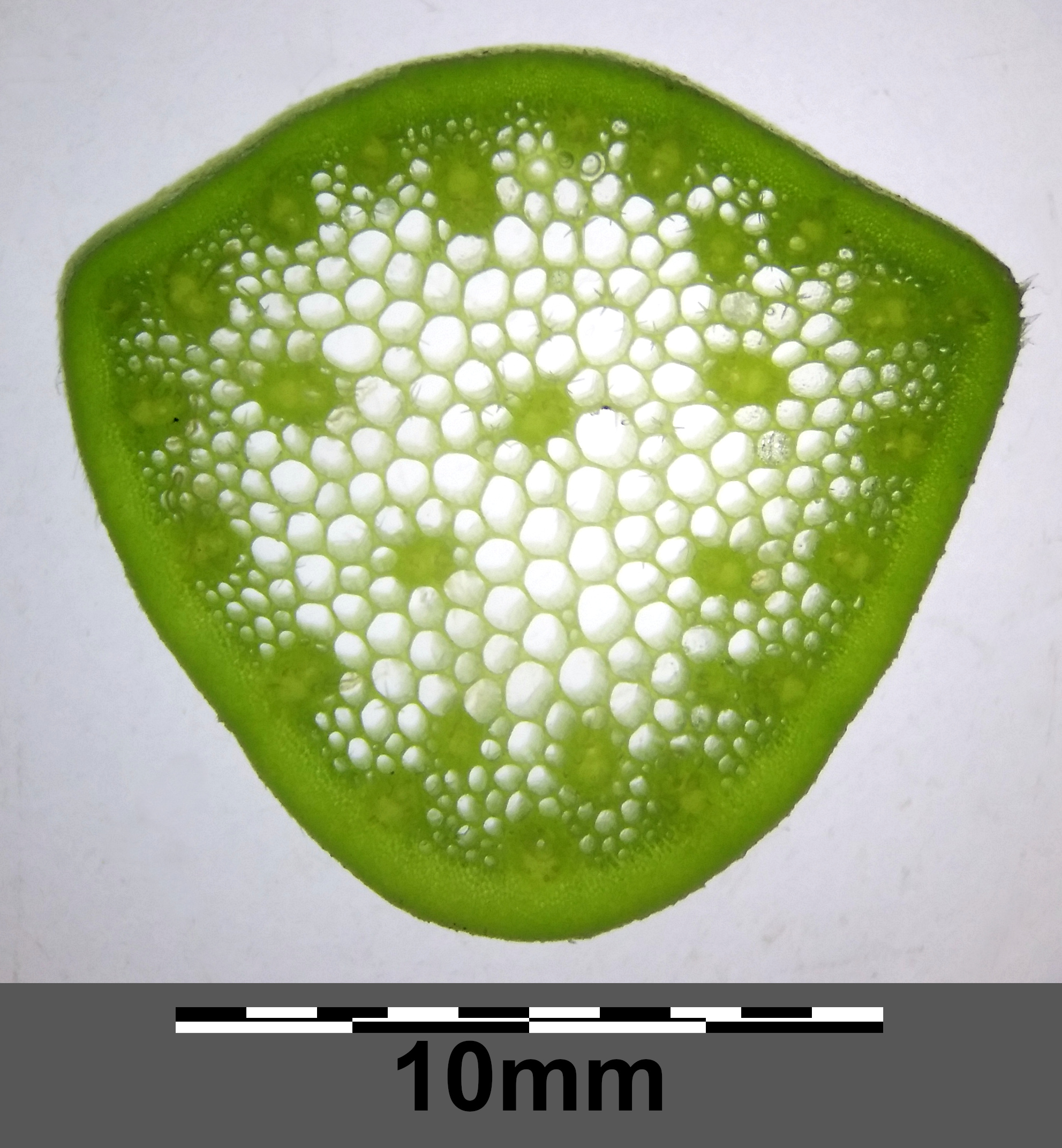
Cross section of the petiole with scale bar (10 mm)

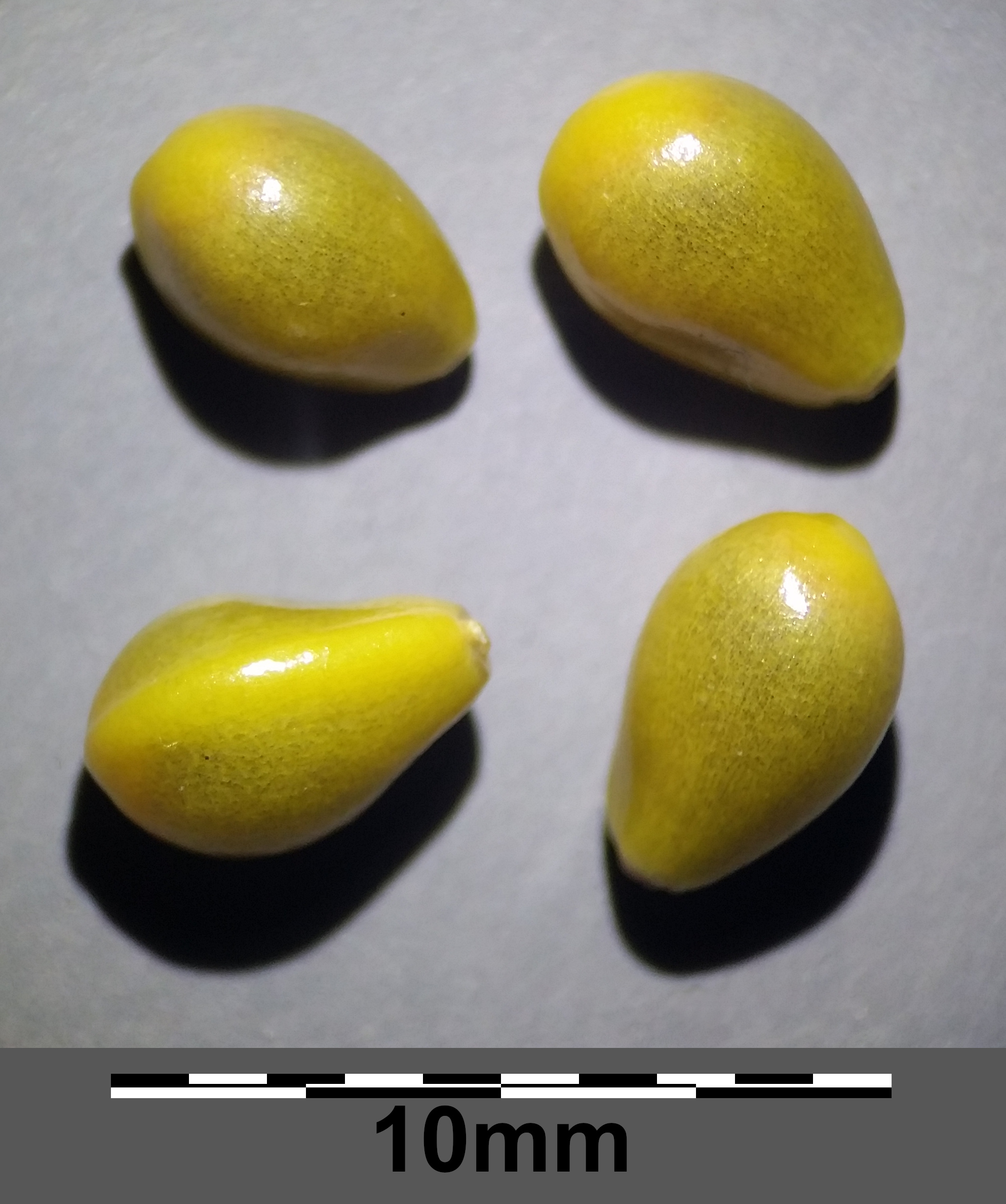
Seeds with scale bar (10 mm)

Flag of Frisia
