= Groep fan Auwerk =

Frisian independence group

Interfrisian flag by Groep fan Auwerk

Groep fan Auwerk ("Group of Aurich") is a political activism organization that advocates for an independent Frisian state (Frisia). The group is active in politics and promotes a stronger Frisian identity.

== History ==
Groep fan Auwerk was founded in 2003 and organized its platform. In 2005 they made an application for the Frisian nationality to be recognized by the provincial house of parliament in Leeuwarden and ultimately the Frisian nationality was accepted by the European Union. After that, they made a "FRL" (Friesland) license plate sticker to replace the official "NL" (Netherlands).

On 23 September 2006, Groep fan Auwerk presented a proposal for an Inter-Frisian flag, intended to represent all Frisian regions, but was rejected by the Interfrisian Council in June 2007. However, the Council adopted the idea of a common flag. The flag of the Groep fan Auwerk previously advised, particularly in East Frisia under criticism because it had been prepared by the group in secret and then propagated massively.

In September 2008, Groep fan Auwerk replaced several traffic signs with Frisian-language versions. On 25 September 2009, Groep fan Auwerk, in cooperation with Frije Fryske Grûn (Free Frisian Foundation) removed the Dutch versions in Wymbritseradiel. The municipality had already decided that the signs should be in Frisian but the activists did not feel that the municipality had effected the change quickly enough.

== See also ==
- Frisian National Party
