= Hunsingo =

Region in Groningen, The Netherlands

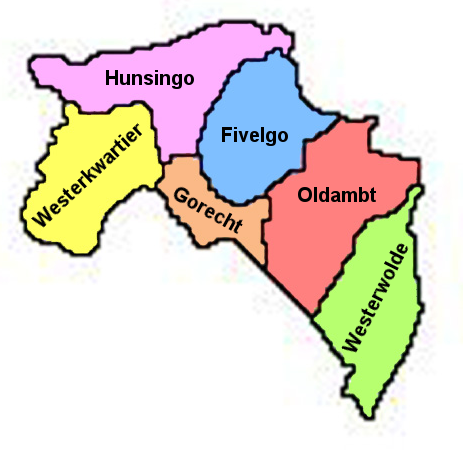
Location of the regions of rural Groningen

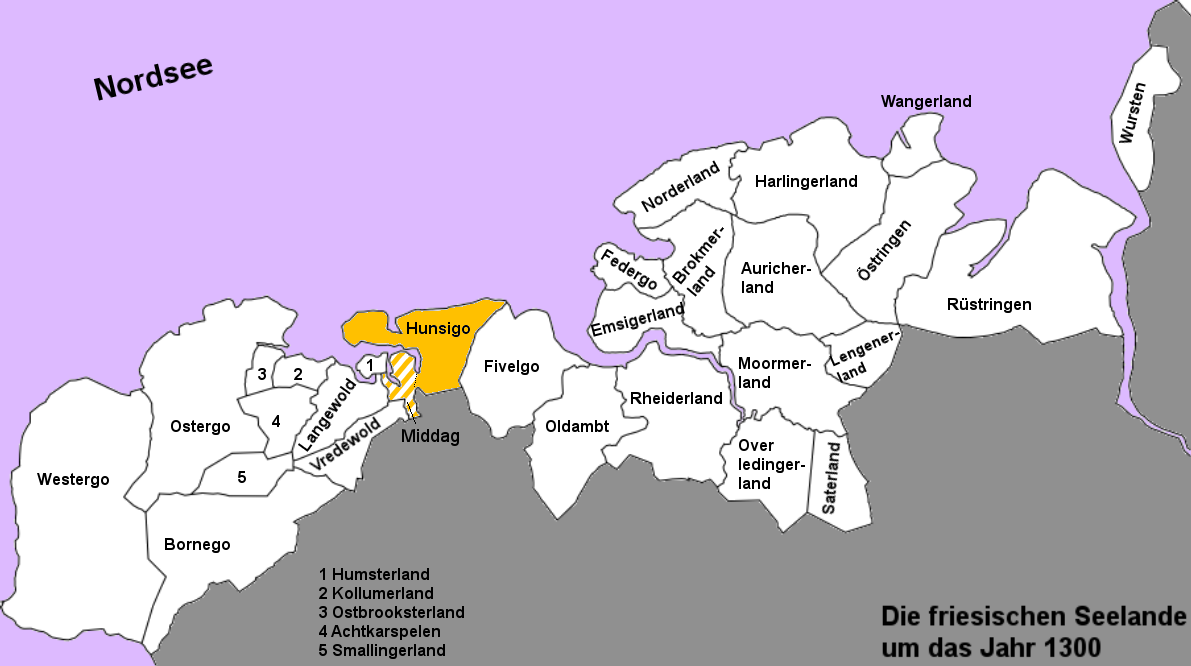
Hunsingo in the year 1300

Hunsingo (Gronings: Hunzego or Hunzengo) is a region in the province of Groningen, Netherlands, between the Reitdiep and Maarvliet. Hunsingo was one of three Ommelanden. It is bordered to the north by the Wadden Sea, to the east Fivelingo, in the west to the Westerkwartier and Friesland and in the south, Gorecht. The region corresponds to the current municipalities De Marne, Eemsmond, the majority of the municipalities of Bedum and Winsum and the former municipality of Middelstum.

The name means area (go or gau) of the Hunze River. The Hunze no longer exists after the construction of the Reitdiep canal. Originally the Hunze followed a different course with its mouth at Pieterburen on the Wadden Sea, and divided Hunsingo into two parts.

Hunsingo was the first member of the Ommelander Union. The main town was Winsum where the Ommelanden for a short time held their own meetings. The area is largely similar to the Hoogeland region although that is more a geographical indication, while Hunsingo was an administrative unit.

The three Wadden islands of Rottumerplaat, Rottumeroog and Zuiderduintjes belong to this area.

== History ==
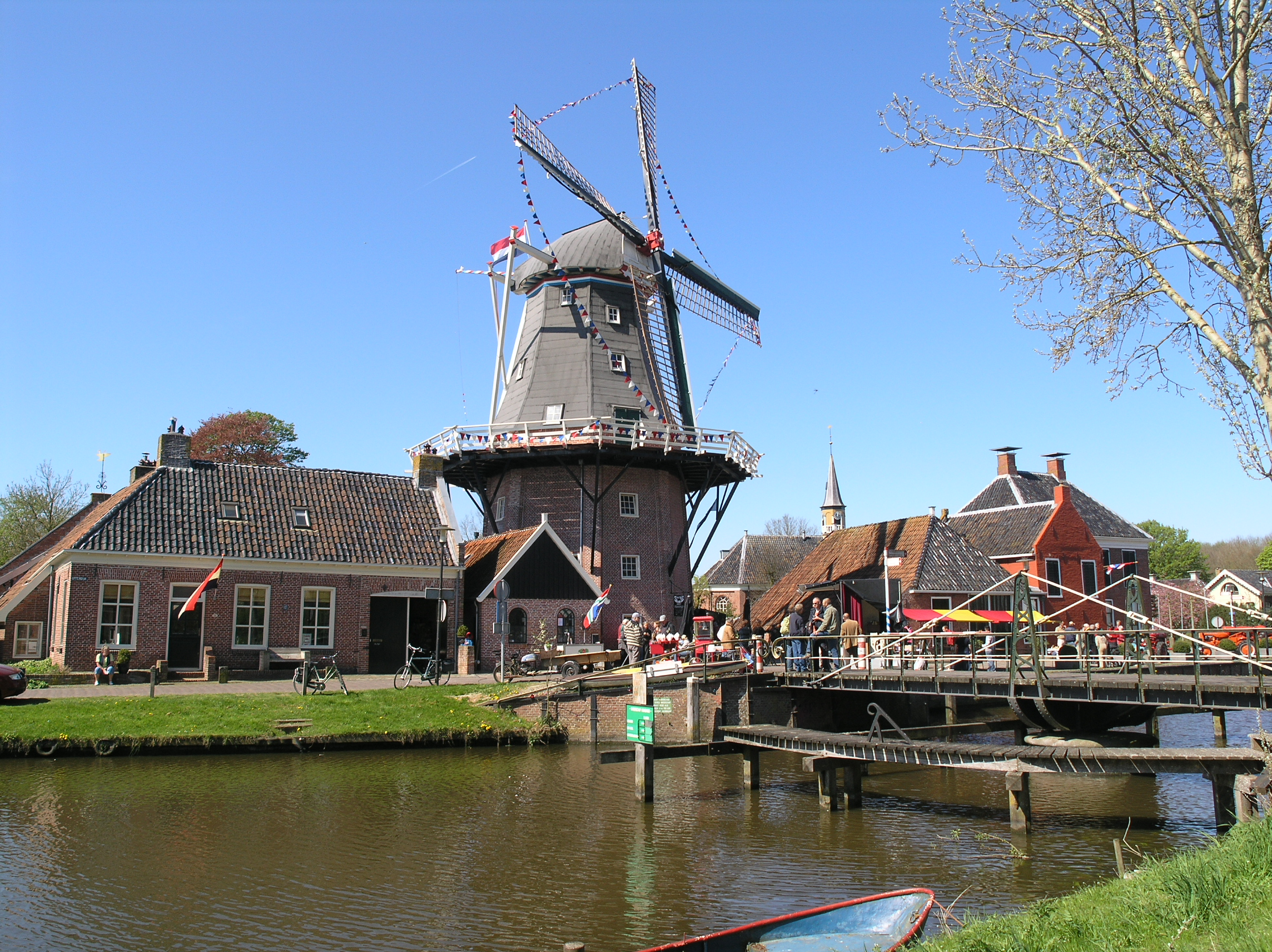
Windmill "Hunsingo" in Onderdendam, now a bed and breakfast

Like Fivelingo, Hunsingo was originally a Frisian region. Ludger was assigned in 787 the mission areas including the regions of Hugmerthi (Humsterland), Hunusga and Fivilga. The monastery of Fulda received in the ninth century a donation in Middelstum "in pago Hunergewe in regione fresonum". In 1057 the region of "Hunsingo" is mentioned as part of a county donated by the Holy Roman Emperor Henry IV, under the regency of his mother, to the Archbishop of Hamburg, Adalbert. Before that, the Saxon noble house of Brunonen had the fief of the county. In the eleventh century, coins were minted in Winsum, which suggests that Winsum was the capital of the region. In later times Onderdendam became the central place of the region.

The population always spoke an East Frisian, but, by uniting the city of Groningen with the surrounding district, East Frisian has merged with Low Saxon (Platduuts) of the city, although the language of the surrounding countryside still retains a strong East Frisian substrate. In the 13th century laws were recorded in Latin or in the Hunsingoer dialect of East Frisian.

In the seventeenth and eighteenth centuries, Hunsingo was the first member of the Ommelander Union. The most important place in Hunsingo, Winsum, was for a brief period where the Ommelander jonkers held their meetings. Winsum was originally therefore a settlement with an urban character. The proximity of the city of Groningen, however, did not allow it the opportunity to become a real city.

The region was originally divided into two or three subdistricts, which coincided with the oldest seenddistricts (sees or mother parishes). Of these the parishes of Usquert and Leens were the oldest:

- Marne (capital Leens)
- Westerambt (western district, chief town Baflo, with the subdivisions Halfambt (north of the Winsumerdiep, capital Baflo) and a southern half, which divided into Upgo or Ubbega (between Winsumerdiep and Reitdiep, capital Winsum) and Middag (south of the Reitdiep, capital Garnwerd)
- Oosterambt (eastern district, capital Usquert)

De Marne was originally part of the region Humsterland (Westerkwartier); however, the emergence of the Reitdiep and the exploitation of the underlying peat led to it becoming a separate seenddistrict. The district, Middag, is also recognized in Westerkwartier since the sixteenth century. The peat area of Innersdijk (around Bedum) was separated from the Oosterambt around the fourteenth century, while De Marne in the fifteenth century temporarily disintegrated into an eastern and a western part. The various districts were characterized by considerable autonomy, the joint representatives gathered in Onderdendam, that was exactly on the border of the main subdivisions.

In 1659 a new classification was ordered by the States General:

- Marnsteradeel
- Halfambsteradeel, consisting of the subdivisions Halfambt and Ubbega
- Oostambtsteradeel, consisting of the subdivisions Oosterambt and Innersdijk

Between 1830 and 1880, 5,900 people emigrated from Hunsingo, almost all going to the United States. This was two-thirds of all emigrations from the entire province of Groningen. Most of the emigrants from Hunsingo ended up in western Michigan, followed by Chicago and a smaller group going to Lafayette, Indiana.

Hunsingo was also the name of the water authority in the area, charged with the management of water levels, canals, dykes and storm barriers. The Hunsingo water board existed from 1856 to 1994 when it was merged into the Noorderzijlvest water board.

== Character ==
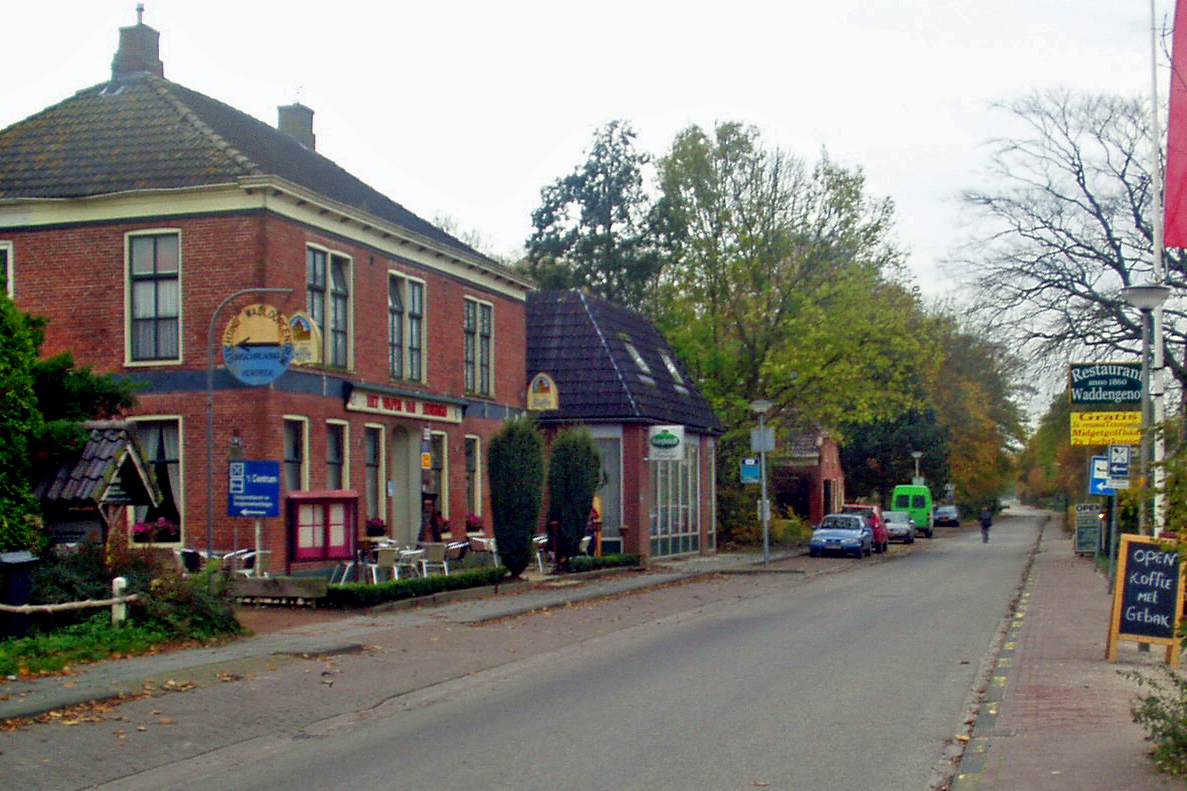
Hotel called "Wapen van Hunsingo" (coat of arms of Hunsingo) in Pieterburen

In Hunsingo, many borg (fortified great houses) were found. This does not imply that there was more nobility in Hunsingo than in the remainder of Groningen. Many of the borgs were destroyed, both by officials and by the dissatisfied people. A famous borg in Hunsingo is the Menkemaborg at Uithuizen. Another is Verhildersum at Leens.

Hunsingo is characterized by meadows, mounds and dikes. Hunsingo has expanded by reclaiming land that initially is filled in by the natural settlement of sedimentary clay by the sea near the dikes (endiking). This area above the old dikes is also known as the Groningen Hogeland (high land). When the new deposits had reached sufficient size, that area was then secured by the construction of a new dyke.

Today Hunsingo is one of the main economic arteries of Groningen. This is due to the Eemshaven on the eastern point and the Lauwersmeer National Park and shrimping village of Zoutkamp on the western point. The shrimp company Heiploeg is located in Zoutland. This is the largest shrimp supplier in Europe.

== See also ==
- Fivel
- Westerkwartier
- Oldambt
- Westerwolde (region)
