= Ommelanden =

Area in Groningen province, Netherlands

Coordinates: 53.3°N 6.7°E

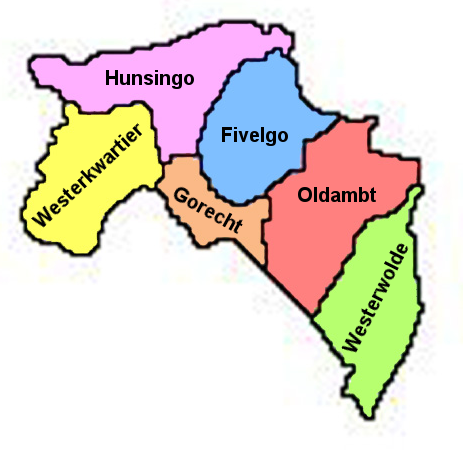
Map of Groningen and Ommelanden

The Ommelanden (Dutch pronunciation: [ˈɔməˌlɑndə(n)]; Surrounding Lands) are the parts of the Dutch province of Groningen that surround Groningen city. Usually mentioned as synonym for the province in the expression Stad en Ommeland ("city and surrounding lands").

Flag of the Ommelanden

The area was Frisian-speaking, but under the influence of the Saxon city of Groningen most of the area turned to speaking Low Saxon. A reminder of the Frisian past is the Ommelanden flag which looks a lot like the Frisian provincial flag but has more and narrower stripes and more red pompeblêden (stylised heart-shaped leaves of yellow water-lily).

The area is made up of the following four quarters:

1. Westerkwartier
2. Hunsingo
3. Fivelingo with Oldambt
4. Westerwolde
