= Interfrisian Council =

Geopolitical organization

Interfrisian Council: Interfriese Raad (Dutch); Interfriesischer Rat (German); Interfreeske Raad (Low German); Interfrasche Rädj (North Frisian); Interfräiske Räid (Saterland Frisian); Ynterfryske Rie (West Frisian)
- Flag
- Seat: Leer
- Official languages: Dutch, German, Low Saxon, North Frisian, Saterland Frisian, West Frisian
- Membership: 3 sections: North Frisia; East Frisia; West Frisia

Leaders
  - President: Helmut Collmann
- Establishment: 1956
- Website; Interfriesischerrat.de

The Interfrisian Council is a geopolitical organization that represents the common interests of the Frisians. The organization consists of three regional councils or "sections": North Frisia, East Frisia and West Frisia. Every three years, the presidency of the Interfrisian Council is handed over to another section. The council was established in 1956.

== History ==
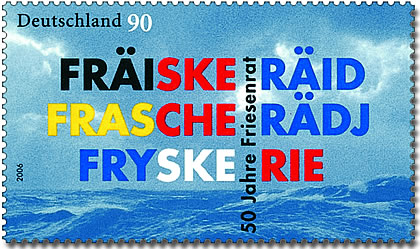
A special German stamp to celebrate the 50-year anniversary of the Interfrisian Council in 2006

The chronicler Peter Sax wrote in the 17th century that the Frisians had a common language, and that they therefore were also one people. Montanus de Haan Hettema traveled from (Westerlauwens') Friesland to Saterland and Northern Friesland in the 19th century and recorded the dialects of Frisian on the way. In 1850 Heinrich Ehrentraut from Oldenburg produced a magazine about the Frisian language and history of the Frisian regions. In the 19th century, the Frisian Society in Leeuwarden appointed members of East and North Friesland. Also during this century contacts were particularly strong between West Frisians and North Frisians. Around 1900, the contacts between the Frisian regions became stronger. This interest came mainly from the linguistic angle, Frisistik. Important individuals in this era were Pieter de Clercq, Jan Jelles Hof and Nann Peter Mungard.

More contact led to the call for an annual meeting of representatives of the three Frisian territories. Douwe Kalma, Eeltsje Boates Folkertsma and the association 'The Upstalbeam' (founded in 1924, named after a medieval Frisian assembly) also called for such meetings. And so the first Great Frisian Congress (Grutfryske Kongres) was organized by Peter Zylmann and held in 1925 in Jever organized with representatives from the three regions, as well as Groningen, Land Wursten, Butjadingen and Jeverland. This was the basis for more joint meetings and the founding of the Frisian Council. At the Great Frisian Congress in Husum in 1930 the Frisian Council was established. The aim of the council was to protect and maintain the bond between the congresses.

During World War II, there were no inter-ministerial meetings and the Frisian Council held itself as politically neutral, though was suspicious of both the German and Dutch governments. The Nazis viewed the Frisian Council with suspicion. The Great-Frisian Congress of 1937 was held in Medemblik (stad). With the German occupation of the Netherlands in 1940, however, the Nazi state wanted to use the Frisian connections encouraged by the council to draw Dutch Frisians with völkisch ideology to their side.

The next Great Frisian Congress was held in 1952 in Husum and then in 1955 in Aurich. Here the Frysk manifest (Frisian manifesto) was adopted, a new basis for Frisian contacts after the war, which placed the Inter-Frisian movement in relation to European unification. A year later, in 1956, the Frisian Council was officially set up in the East Frisian area of Leer. Under the supervision of the Frisian Council, the collection Friesische Gedichte was published in 1973. In 1998, the Interfrisian Council was established to act for the three councils / sections of the Frisian Council in the various Frisian regions. A new Interfrisian Declaration was adopted in 2006. In 2006, the German Post (Deutsche Post) issued a commemorative stamp for the 50th anniversary of the Interfrisian Council.

== Organization ==
Each of the three sections has its own board and administrative center. Section North currently holds the presidency of the Interfrisian Council until 2024.

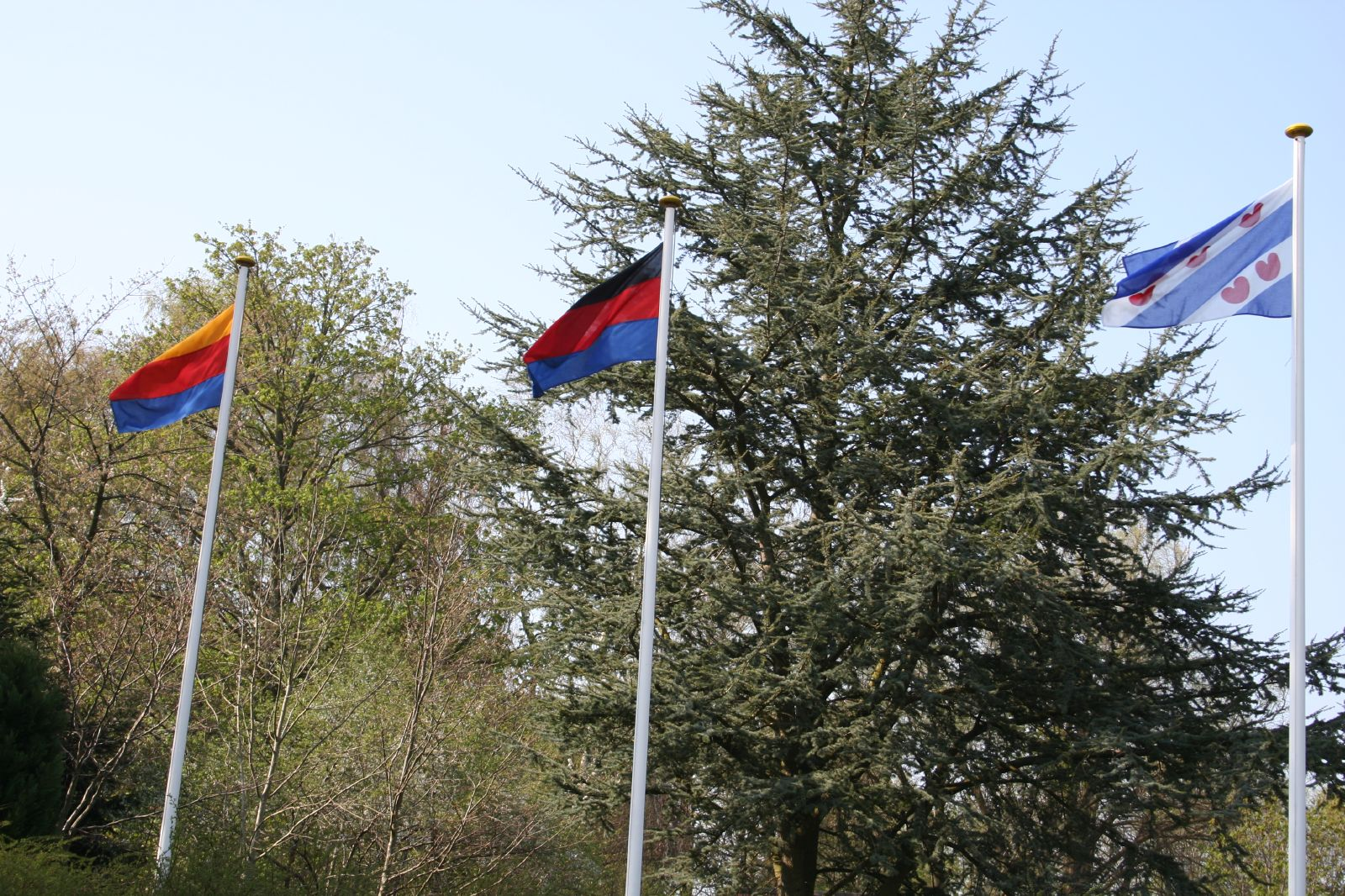
The flags of the three sections at the 2006 Interfrisian Congress in Leck

=== Sections ===
Section West		Section East		Section North	
Seat:	Leeuwarden	Seat:	Aurich	Seat:	Bredstedt
Presidency:	2018–2021	Presidency:	2015–2018	Presidency:	2021–2024
Chairman:	Roel Kaastra	Chairman:	Arno Ulrichs	Chairman:	Ilse Johanna Christiansen
Secretary:	Anton van der Ploeg	Secretary:	Wolfgang Meiners	Secretary:	Frank Nickelsen

=== Board ===
Since the start of Section East's presidency in 2015, the board of the Interfrisian Council consists of:

- Helmut Collmann (president)
- Arno Ulrichs
- Ilse Johanna Christiansen
- Gudrun Fuchs
- Roel Kaastra
- Anton van der Ploeg
