= Cordate =

Cordate is an adjective meaning 'heart-shaped' and is most typically used for:

- Cordate (leaf shape), in plants
- Cordate axe, a prehistoric stone tool

== See also ==
- Chordate, a member of a major phylum of animals
- Cordata (disambiguation)
