= Heart symbol =

Symbol representing the heart

Conventional heart symbol

A heart symbol pierced with an arrow, symbolizing romantic love (being lovestruck, or the pain of lovesickness)

A typical depiction of the Sacred Heart (often shown with other attributes, e.g. surmounted by a cross, pierced by nails or swords, etc.)

The heart symbol is an ideograph used to express the idea of the "heart" in its metaphorical or symbolic sense. The symbol is a symmetrical shape consisting of "two similar curves meeting in a point at one end and a cusp at the other," not an anatomically correct representation of a heart. Often colored red, the heart symbol denotes the center of emotion, including affection and love, especially romantic love. While ancient antecedents may exist, this shape for the heart became fixed in Europe in the Middle Ages. It is sometimes accompanied or superseded by a "wounded heart" symbol, depicted as a heart symbol pierced with an arrow, indicating lovesickness, or as a "broken" heart symbol in two or more pieces, indicating heartbreak.

== History ==
=== Similar shapes from antiquity ===
Peepal leaves were used in artistic depictions by the Indus Valley civilisation; a heart-shaped pendant originating from there has been discovered and is now exhibited in the National Museum of India. In the 5th–6th century BC, the heart shape was used in the Roman world to represent the seeds of the plant silphium, a plant possibly used as a contraceptive and an aphrodisiac. Silver coins from Cyrene of the 5th–6th century BC bear a similar design, sometimes accompanied by a silphium plant and is understood to represent its seed or fruit.

Since ancient times in Japan, the heart symbol has been called Inome (猪目), meaning the eye of a wild boar, and it has the meaning of warding off evil spirits. The decorations are used to decorate Shinto shrines, Buddhist temples, castles, and weapons. The oldest examples of this pattern are seen in some of the Japanese original tsuba (sword guard) of the style called toran gata tsuba (lit., inverted egg shaped tsuba) that were attached to swords from the sixth to seventh centuries, and part of the tsuba was hollowed out in the shape of a heart symbol.

=== Earliest use ===
The combination of the heart shape and its use within the heart metaphor was developed in the end of the Middle Ages, although the shape has been used in many ancient epigraphy monuments and texts. With possible early examples or direct predecessors in the 13th to 14th century, the familiar symbol of the heart representing love developed in the 15th century, and became popular in Europe during the 16th.

Before the 14th century, the heart shape was not associated with the meaning of the heart metaphor. The geometric shape itself is found in much earlier sources. However, in such instances it does not depict a heart, but typically foliage: in examples from antiquity fig leaves, and in medieval iconography and heraldry, typically the leaves of ivy and of the water-lily.

The first known, but disputed, depiction of a heart as a symbol of romantic love dates to the 1250s. It occurs in a miniature decorating a capital 'S' in a manuscript of the French Roman de la poire. In the miniature, a kneeling lover (or more precisely, an allegory of the lover's "sweet gaze" or doux regard) offers his heart to a damsel. The heart here resembles a pine cone (held "upside down", the point facing upward), in accord with medieval anatomical descriptions. However, in this miniature, what suggests a heart shape is only the result of a lover's finger superimposed on an object; the full shape outline of the object is partly hidden, and, therefore unknown. Moreover, the French title of the manuscript that features the miniature translates into "Novel of the pear" in English. Thus the heart-shaped object would be a pear; the conclusion that a pear represents a heart is dubious, and opinions differ over this claimed depiction of a heart denoting romantic love.

Giotto in his 1305 painting in the Scrovegni Chapel (Padua) shows an allegory of charity (caritas) handing her heart to Jesus Christ. This heart is also depicted in the pine cone shape based on anatomical descriptions of the day (still held "upside down"). Giotto's painting exerted considerable influence on later painters, and the motive of Caritas offering a heart is shown by Taddeo Gaddi in Santa Croce, by Andrea Pisano on the bronze door of the south porch of the Florence Baptistery (c. 1337), by Ambrogio Lorenzetti in the Palazzo Publico in Siena (c. 1340) and by Andrea da Firenze in Santa Maria Novella in Florence (c. 1365). The convention of showing the heart point upward switches in the late 14th century and becomes rare in the first half of the 15th century.

The "scalloped" shape of the now-familiar heart symbol, with its sides concave toward its base, arises in the early 14th century, at first only lightly dented, as in the miniatures in Francesco da Barberino's Documenti d'amore (before 1320). A slightly later example with a more pronounced dent is found in a manuscript from the Cistercian monastery in Brussels. The convention of showing a dent at the base of the heart thus spread at about the same time as the convention of showing the heart with its point downward. The modern indented red heart has been used on playing cards since the late 15th century.

Various hypotheses attempted to connect the "heart shape" as it evolved in the Late Middle Ages with instances of the geometric shape in antiquity. Such theories are modern, proposed from the 1960s onward, and they remain speculative, as no continuity between the supposed ancient predecessors and the late medieval tradition can be shown. Specific suggestions include the shape of the seed of the silphium plant, used in ancient times as an herbal contraceptive, or stylized depictions of breasts, buttocks, or the pubic mound or spread vulva.

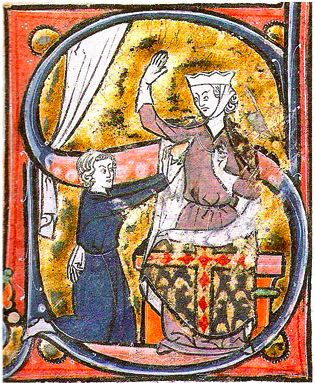
The earliest known possible visual depiction of a heart symbol, as a lover hands his heart to the beloved lady, in a manuscript of the Roman de la poire, 13th century

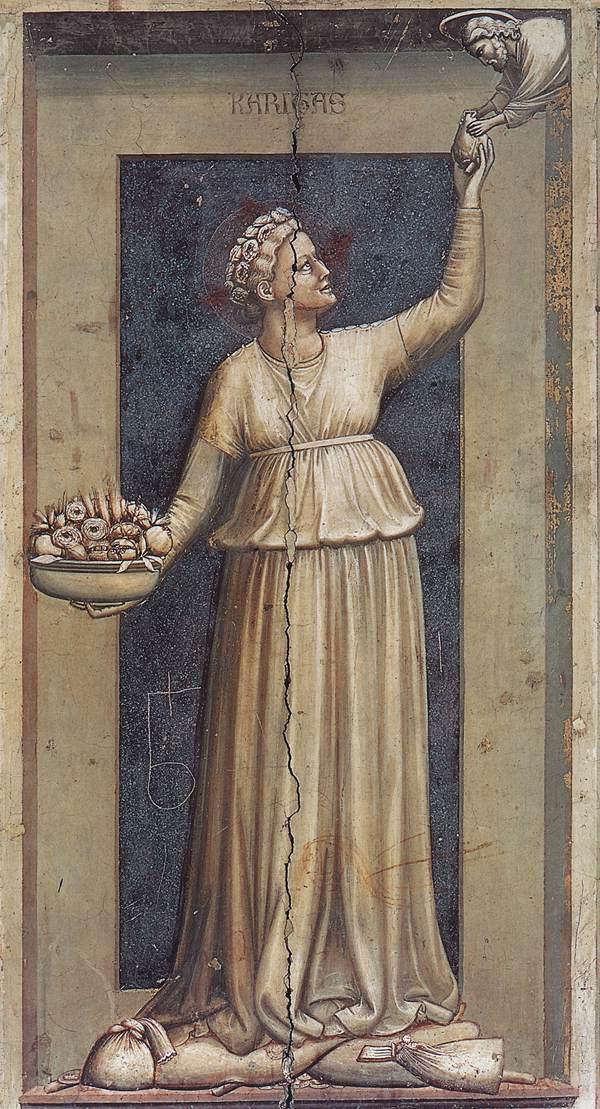
Giotto's allegory of charity handing her heart to Jesus Christ (c. 1305)

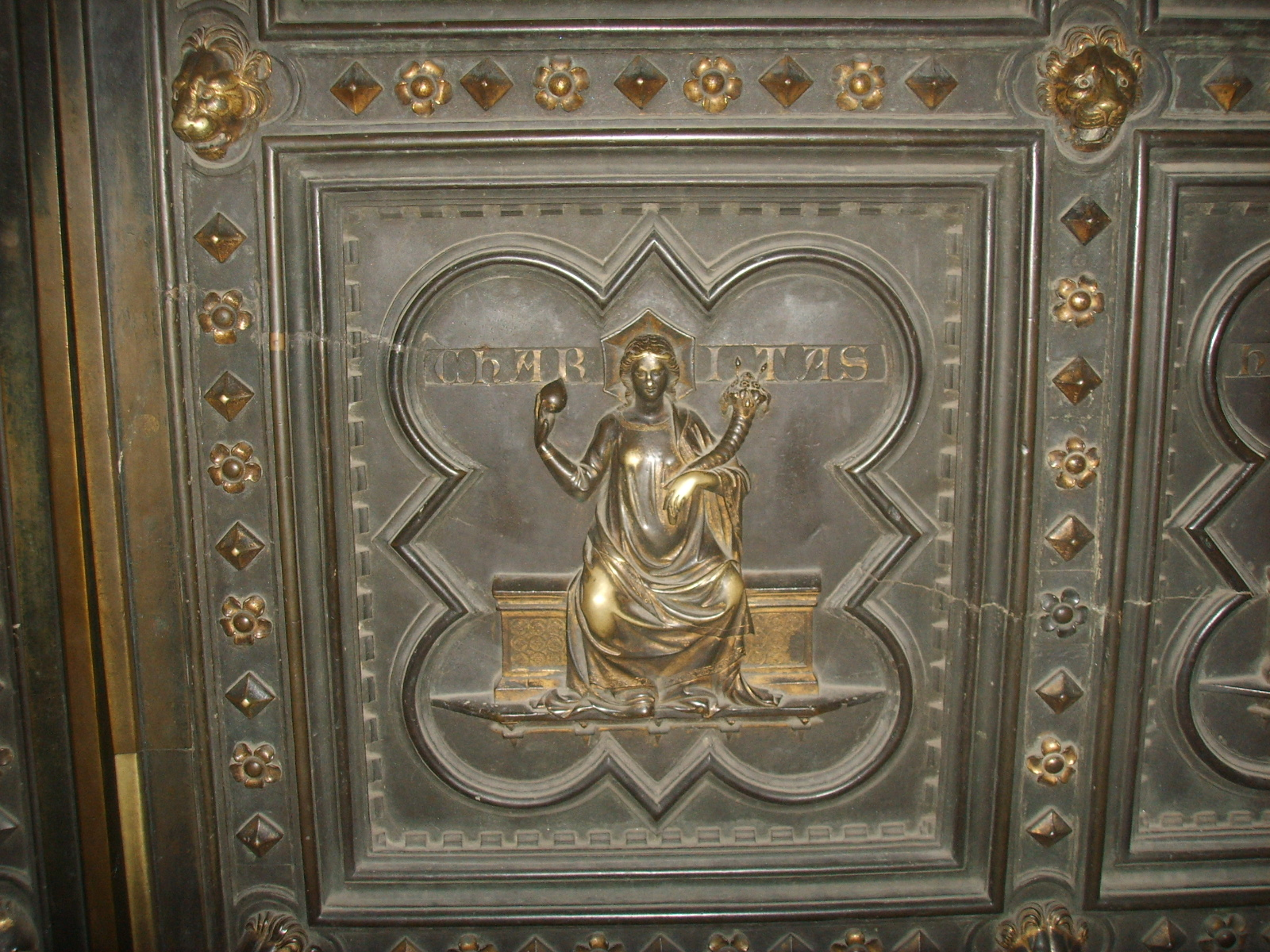
Charity on the south doors of the Florence Baptistery (c. 1336)

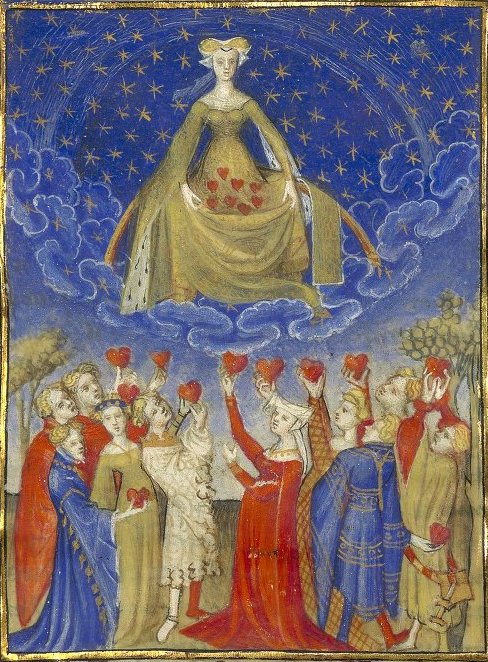
Modern-looking heart symbols are presented to Venus in an illumination by the Master of the Epître d'Othéa (c. 1407)

=== Renaissance and early modern ===
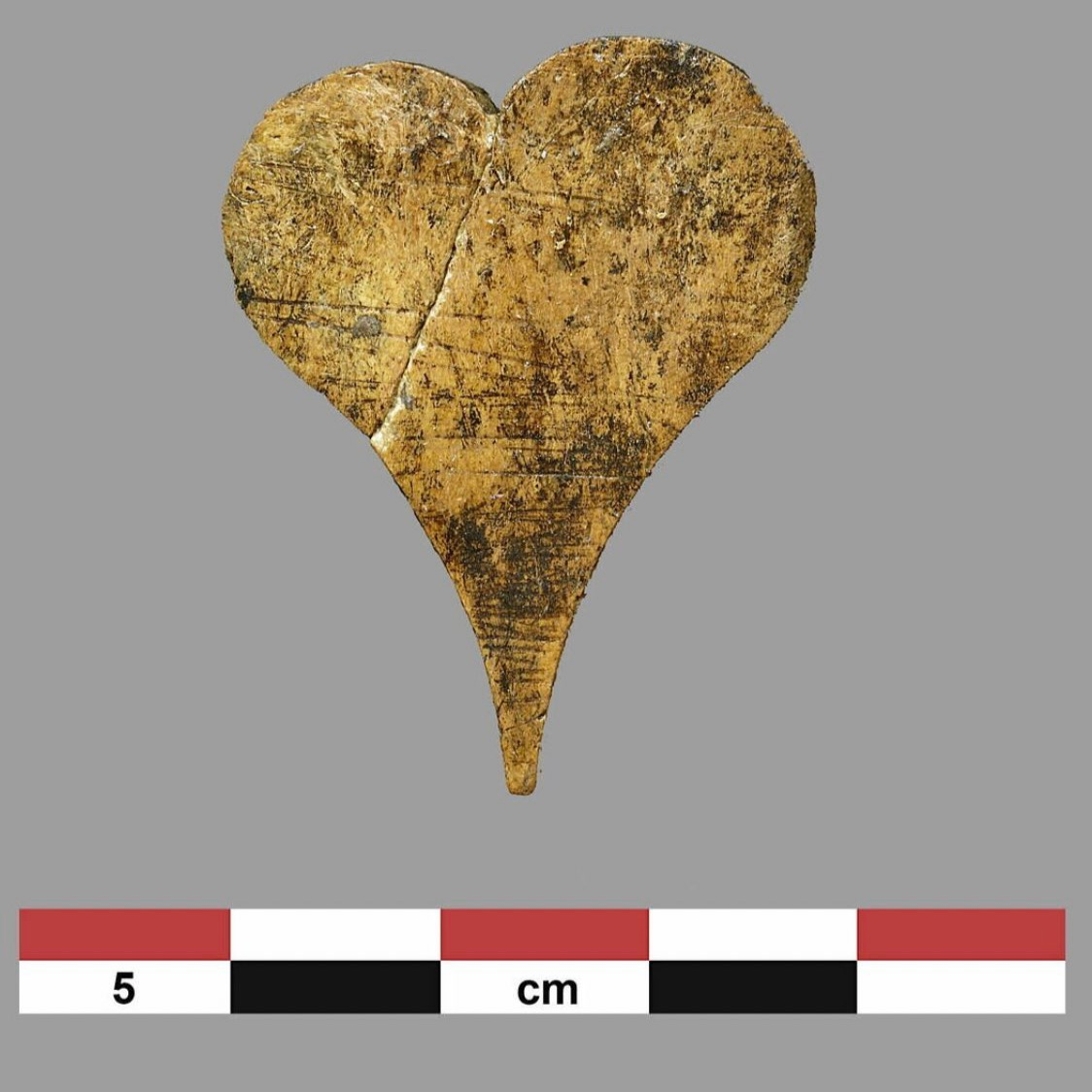
A heart symbol from the Achaemenid period, in the Louvre Museum, made of ivory

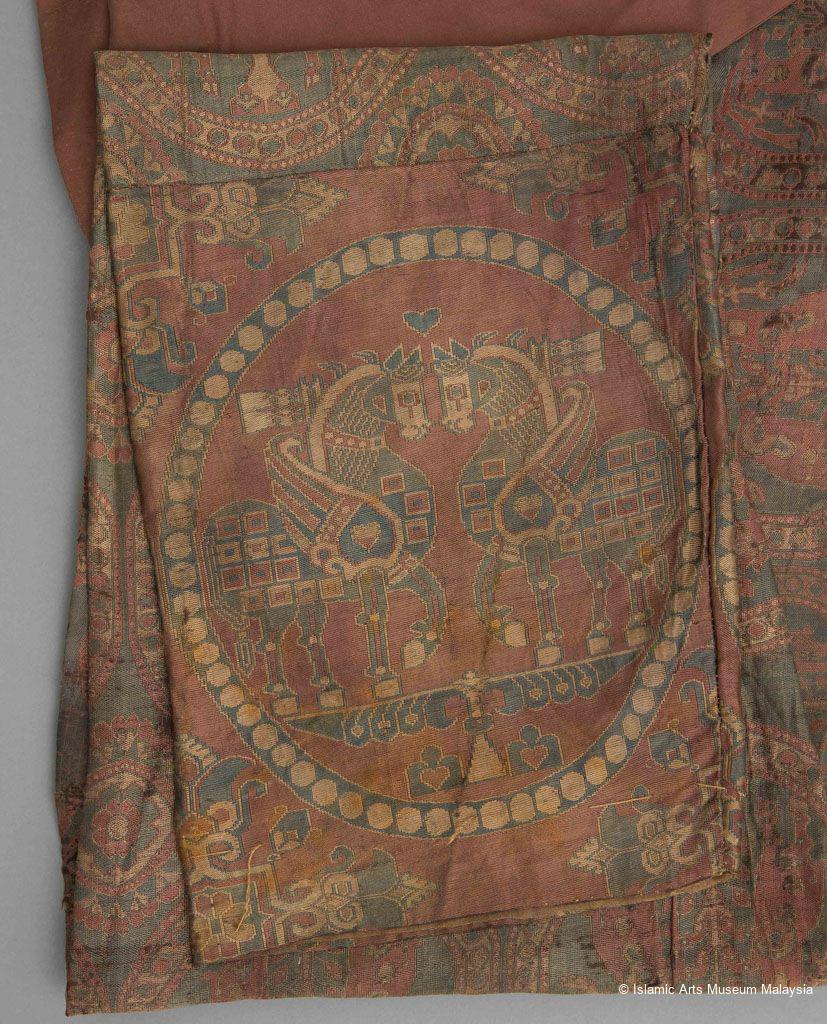
A sasanian-style textile from first century AH that shows two winged horses with one heart symbol on top of them

Heart shapes can be seen on various stucco reliefs and wall panels excavated from the ruins of Ctesiphon, the Persian capital (c. 90 BC – 637 AD).

The Luther rose was the seal that was designed for Martin Luther at the behest of Prince John Frederick, in 1530, while Luther was staying at the Coburg Fortress during the Diet of Augsburg. Luther wrote an explanation of the symbol to Lazarus Spengler: "a black cross in a heart, which retains its natural color, so that I myself would be reminded that faith in the Crucified saves us. 'For one who believes from the heart will be justified' (Romans 10:10)."

The aorta remains visible, as a protrusion at the top centered between the two "chambers" indicated in the symbol, in some depictions of the Sacred Heart well into the 18th century, and is partly still shown today (although mostly obscured by elements such as a crown, flames, rays, or a cross) but the "hearts" suit did not have this element since the 15th century.

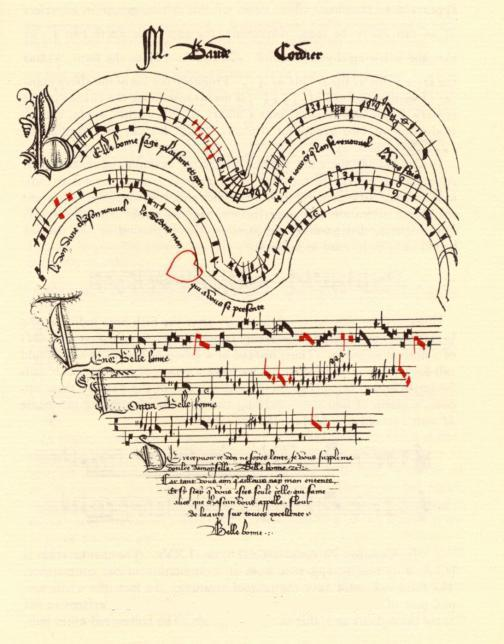
The chanson Belle, Bonne, Sage by Baude Cordier, written in the shape of a heart, in the Chantilly Codex. This is one of two dedicatory pieces placed at the beginning of the older (late 14th century) corpus, probably to replace the original first fascicle, which is missing.

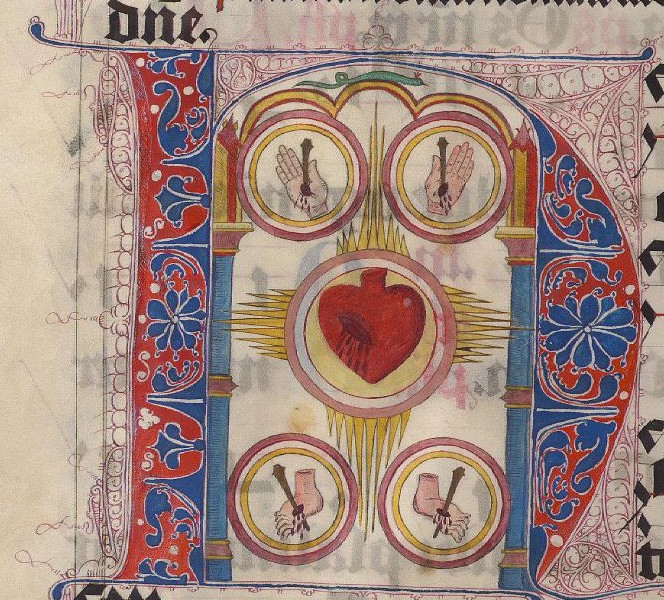
Early depiction of the Heart of Jesus in the context of the Five Wounds (the wounded heart here depicting Christ's wound inflicted by the Lance of Longinus) in a 15th-century manuscript

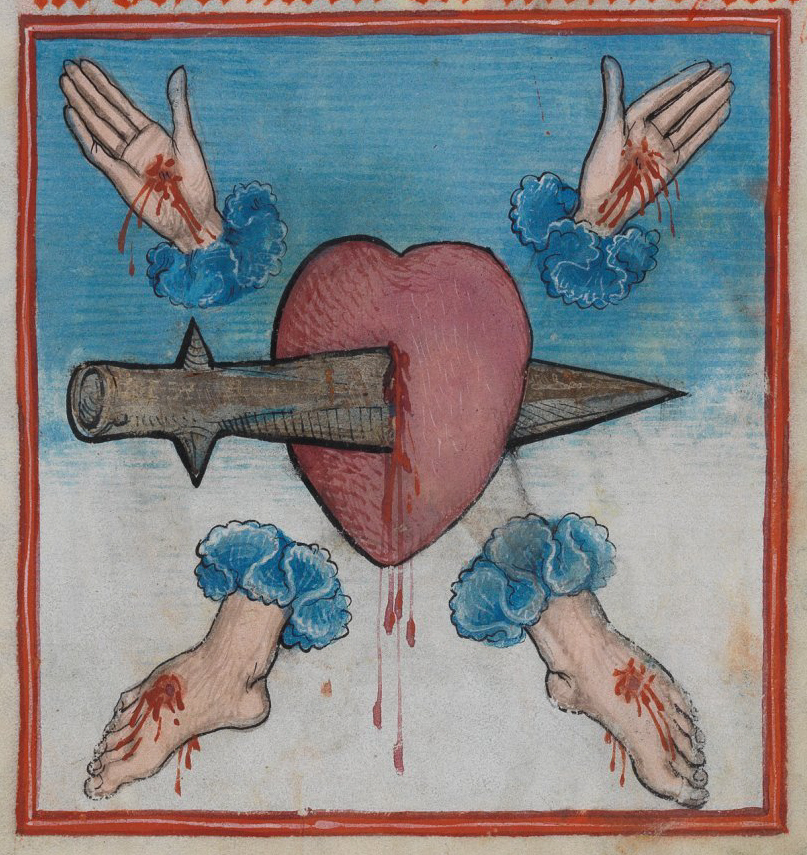
1486 depiction of the Five Wounds

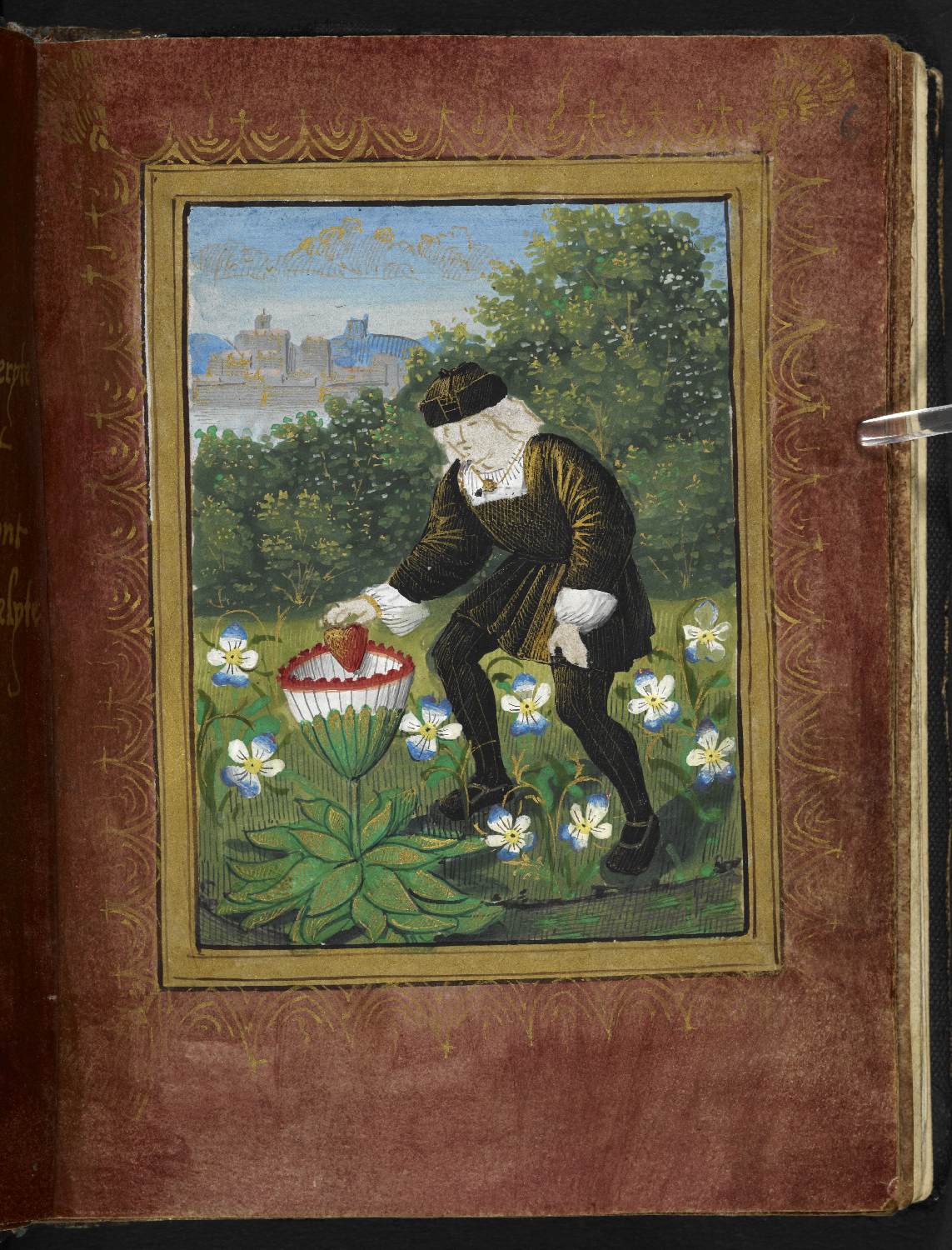
Miniature from the Petit Livre d'Amour (c. 1500), showing the author Pierre Sala depositing his heart in a marguerite flower (symbolizing his mistress, who was called Marguerite). Also worth mentioning is the miniature on fol. 13r, showing two women catching winged hearts in a net.

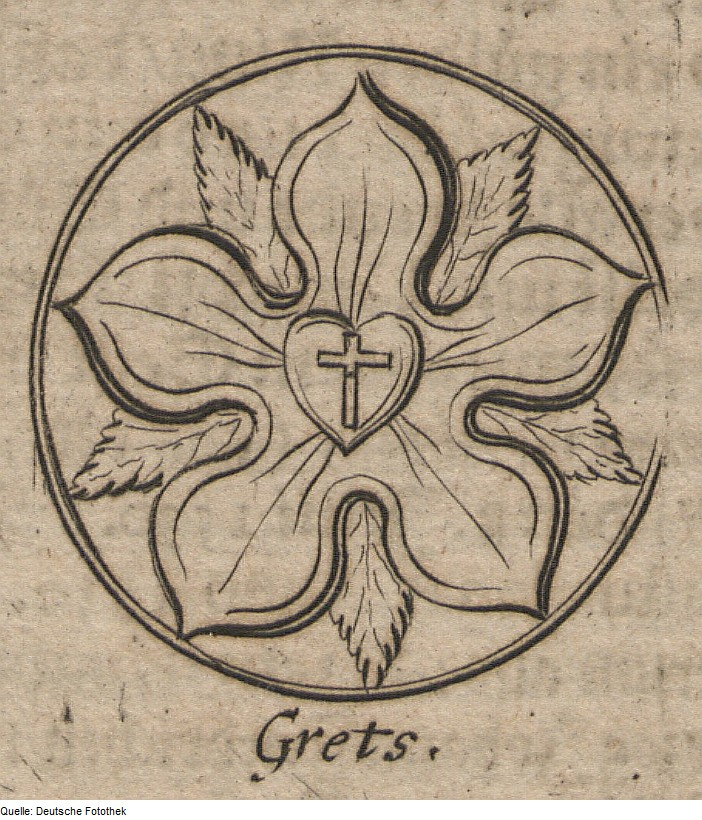
The Luther rose, 1706 print after the 1530 design

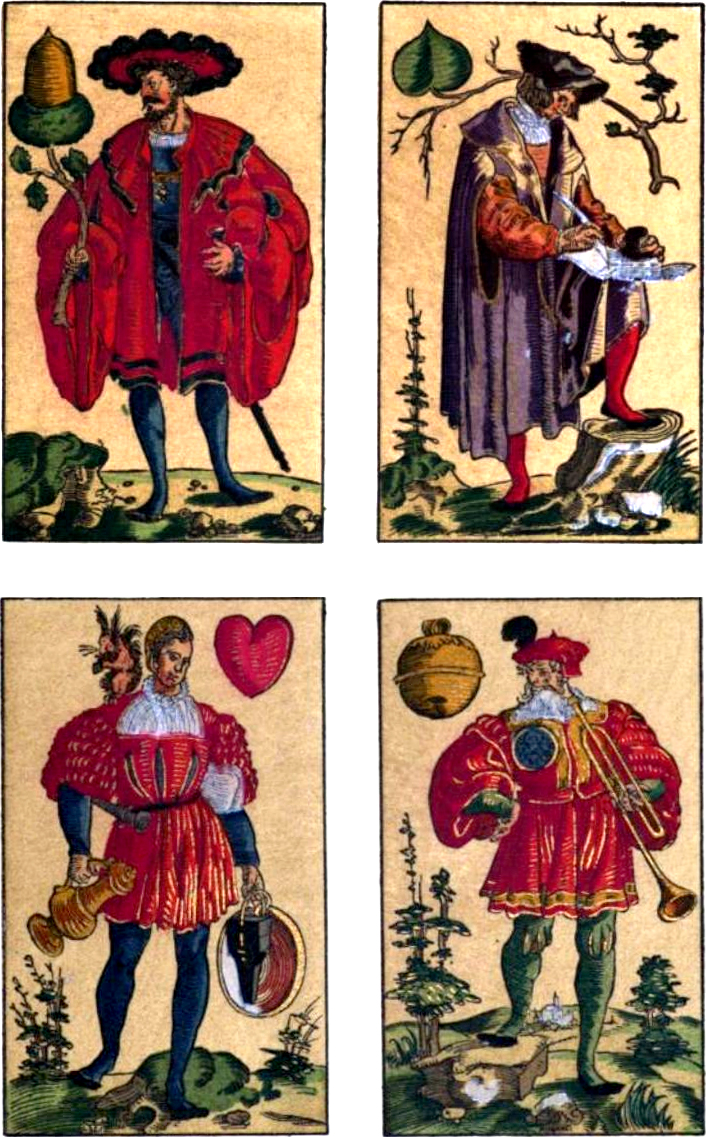
Hearts suit in a 1540s German deck of playing cards

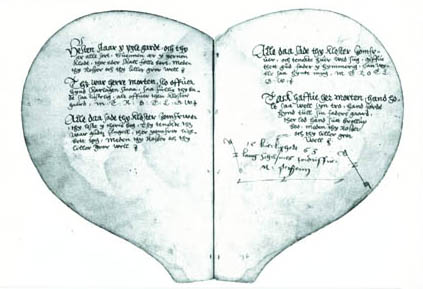
The Danish "Heart Book", a heart-shaped manuscript of love ballads from the 1550s

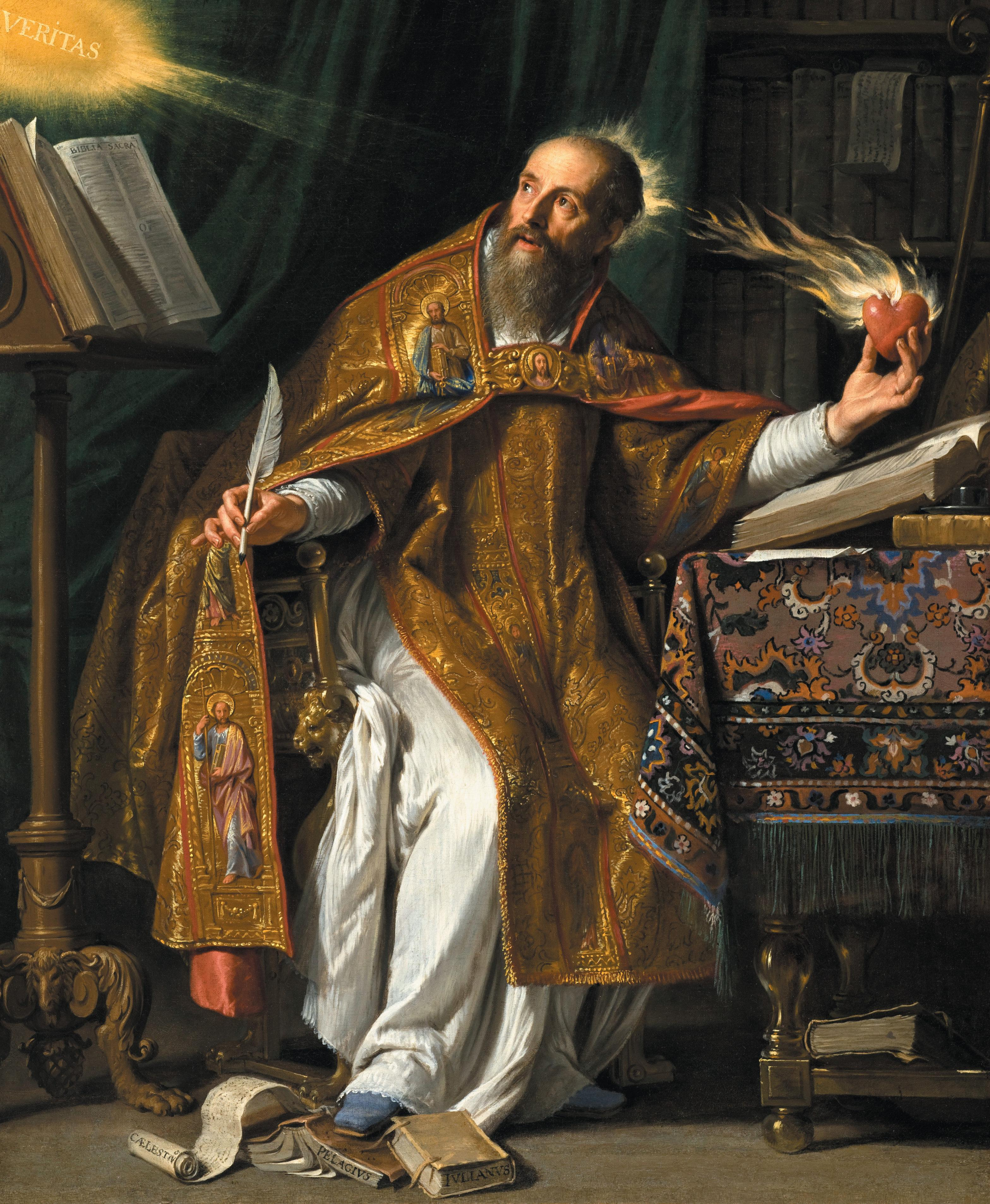
Augustine of Hippo holding a heart in his hand which is set alight by a ray emanating from divine Truth (Veritas), painting by Philippe de Champaigne, c. 1650

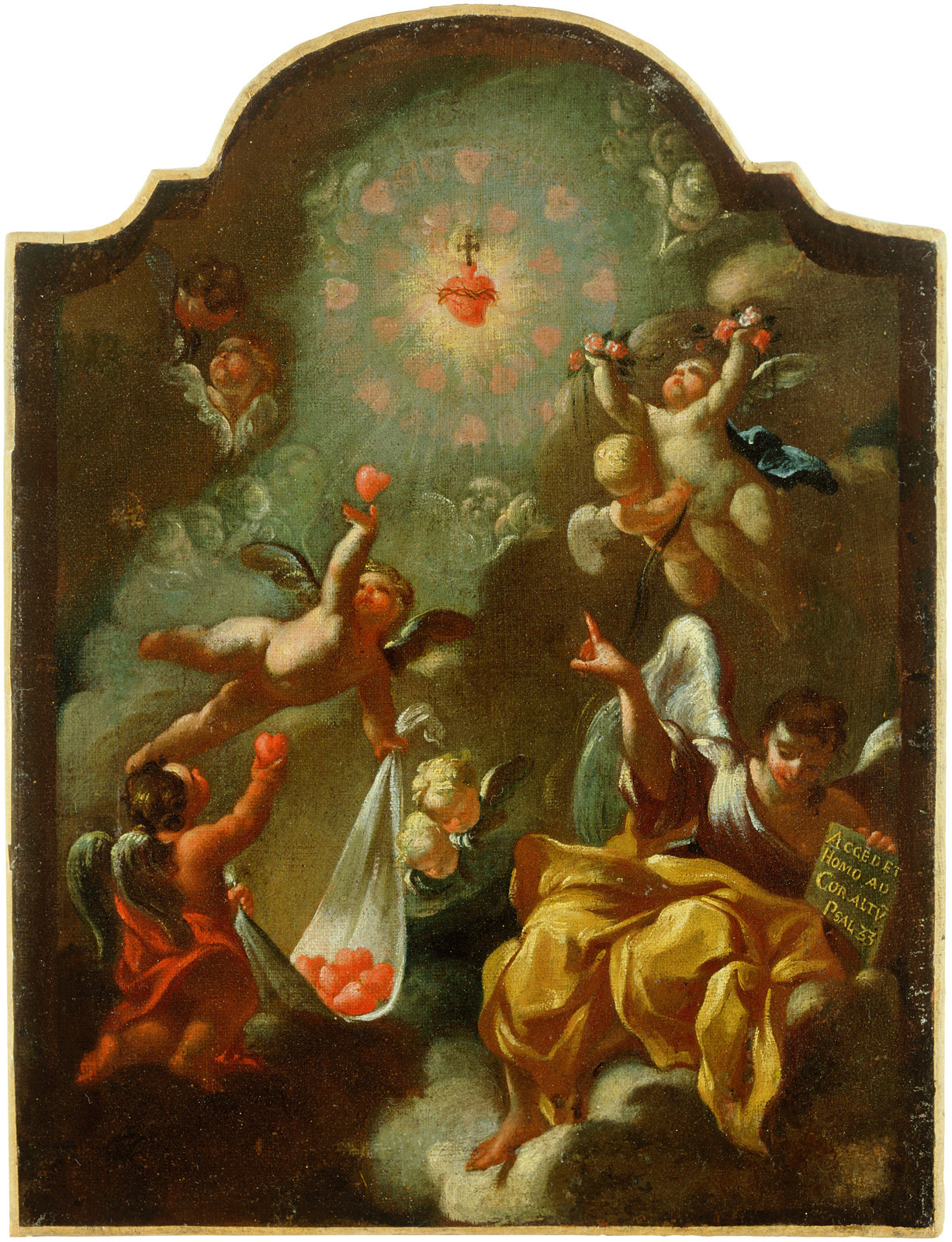
Allegorical painting of the Sacred Heart of Jesus. The central heart radiates hearts gathered up by Putti. By Robert la Longe, c. 1705.

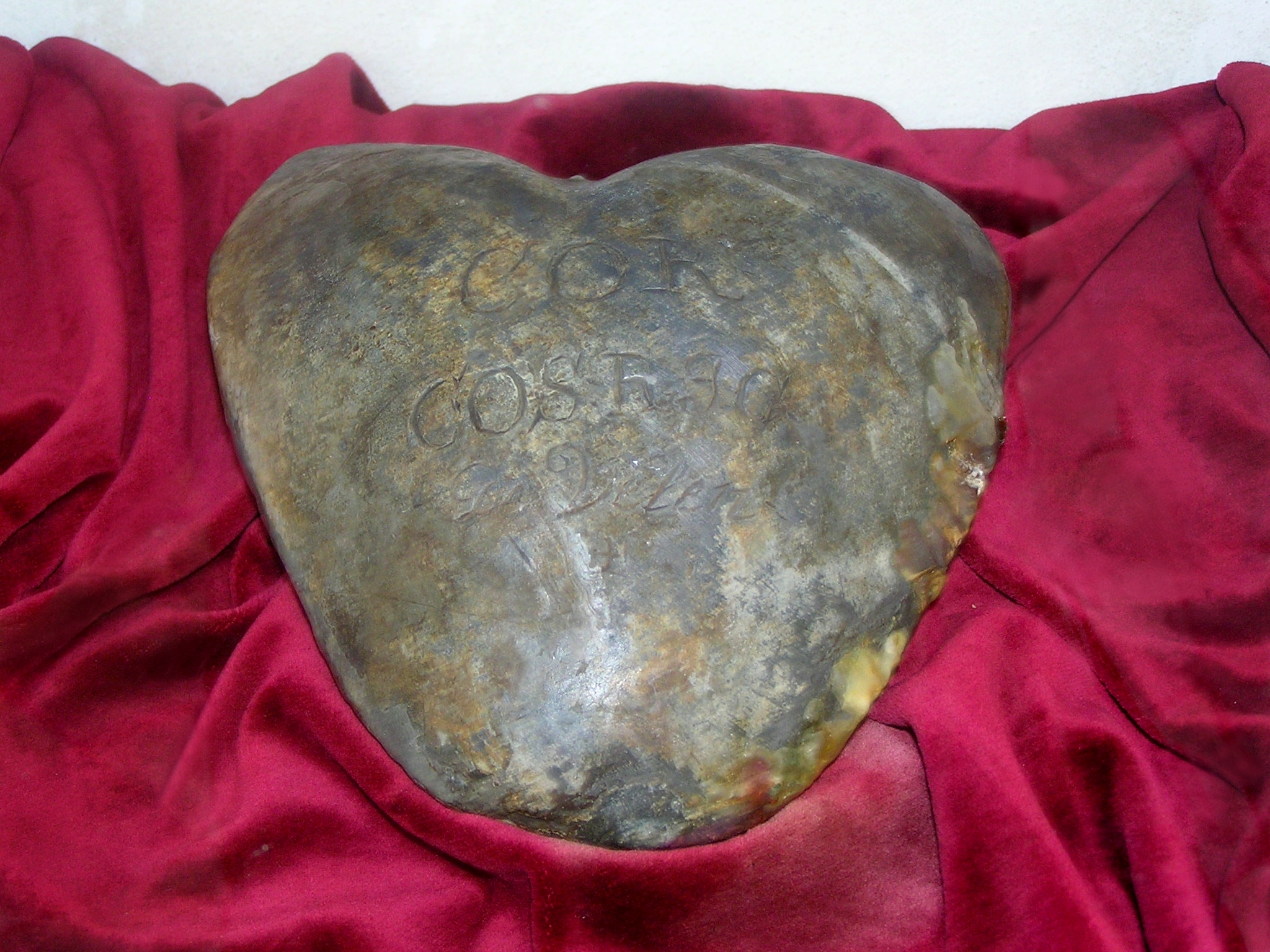
Leaden heart of Raesfeld chapel (funerary casket containing the heart of Christoph Otto von Velen, d. 1733)

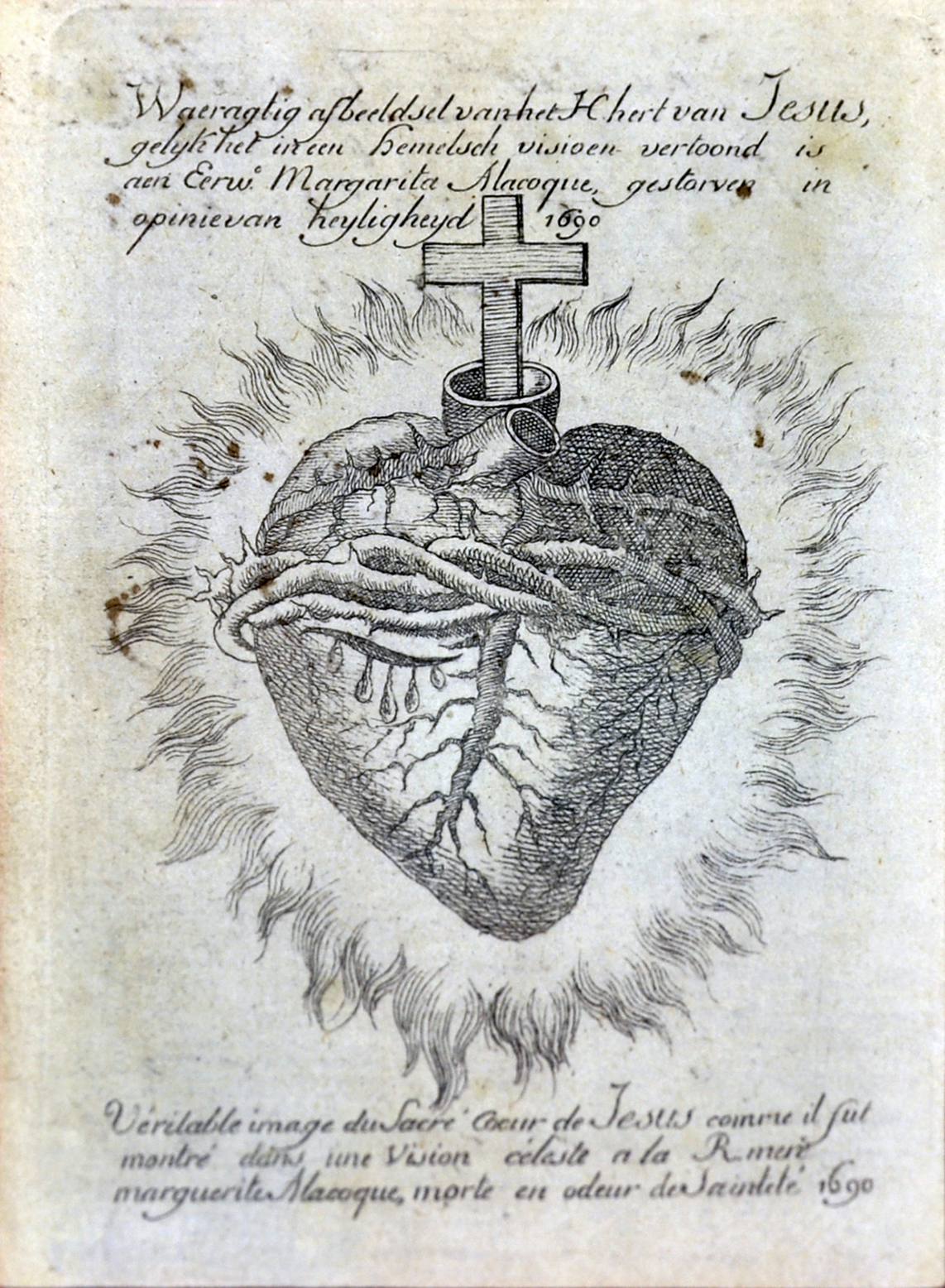
18th-century depiction of the Sacred Heart from the vision of Marguerite Marie Alacoque (d. 1690). The heart is both "heart-shaped" and drawn anatomically correct, with both the aorta and the pulmonary artery visible, and with the crucifix placed inside the aorta.

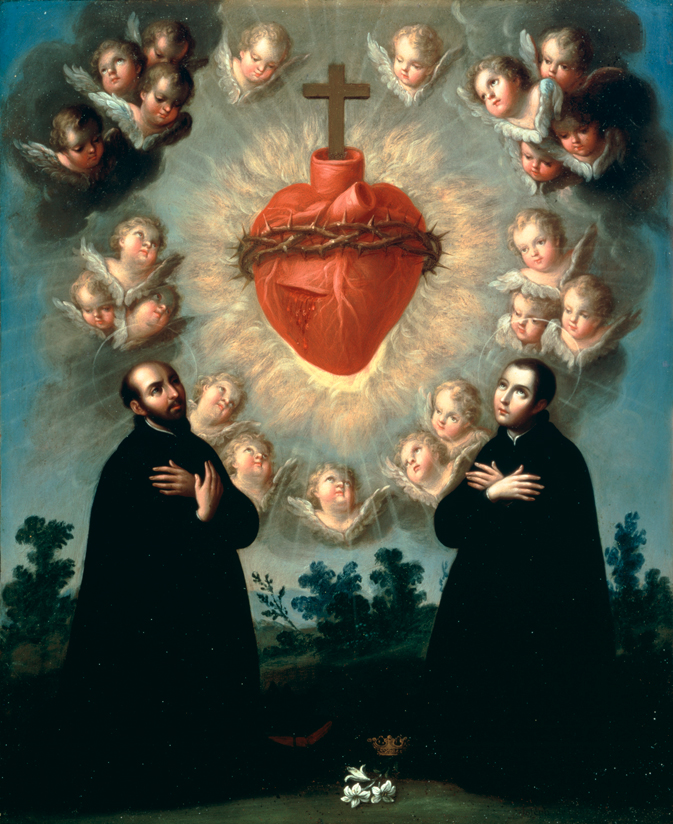
Another anatomically correct Sacred Heart, painted in c. 1770 by José de Páez

=== Modern ===
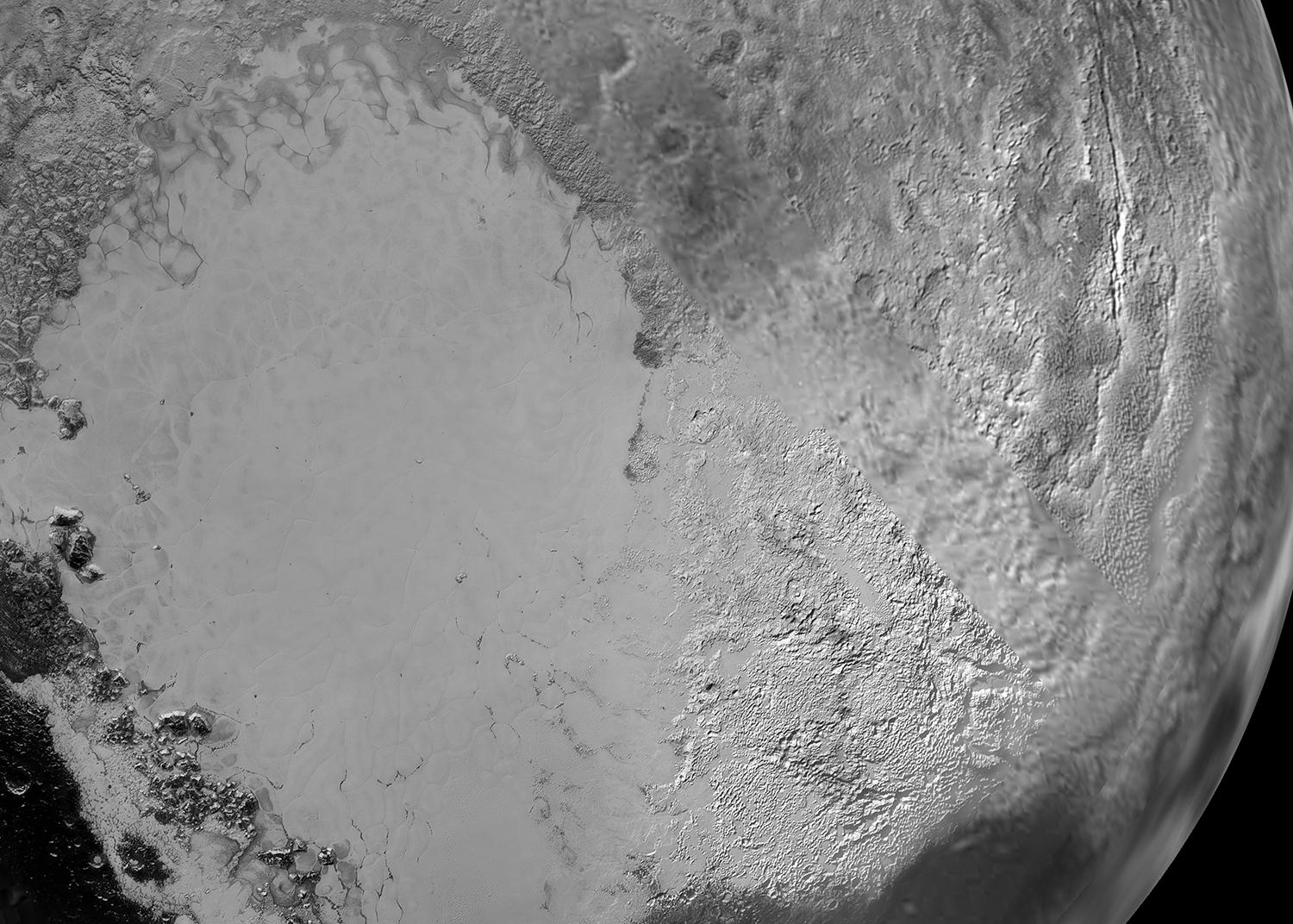
Tombaugh Regio, a bright surface feature on Pluto, is often nicknamed 'Pluto's heart' because it is shaped like a heart.

Since the 19th century, the symbol has often been used on Valentine's Day cards, candy boxes, and similar popular culture artifacts as a symbol of romantic love.

The use of the heart symbol as a logograph for the English verb "to love" derives from the use in "I ♥ NY," introduced by the designer Mary Wells Lawrence in 1977.

Outdoor toilets in Scandinavia traditionally had a heart shaped ventilation hole. In homes a heart symbol made from red painted plywood, or a stuffed fabric one, is often used to assist visitors in finding the modern facility. For image see: Hjerte (symbol)

Heart symbols are frequently used to symbolize "health" or "lives" in video games. The Legend of Zelda (1986) had a "life bar" composed of heart shapes, and many other games continued this convention (the Castlevania franchise being a notable exception, where the hearts are ammunition for the secondary weapons instead of representing health). Since the 1990s, the heart symbol has also been used as an ideogram indicating health outside of the video gaming context, e.g., its use by restaurants to indicate heart-healthy nutrient content claim (e.g., "low in cholesterol"). A copyrighted "heart-check" symbol to indicate heart-healthy food was introduced by the American Heart Association in 1995.

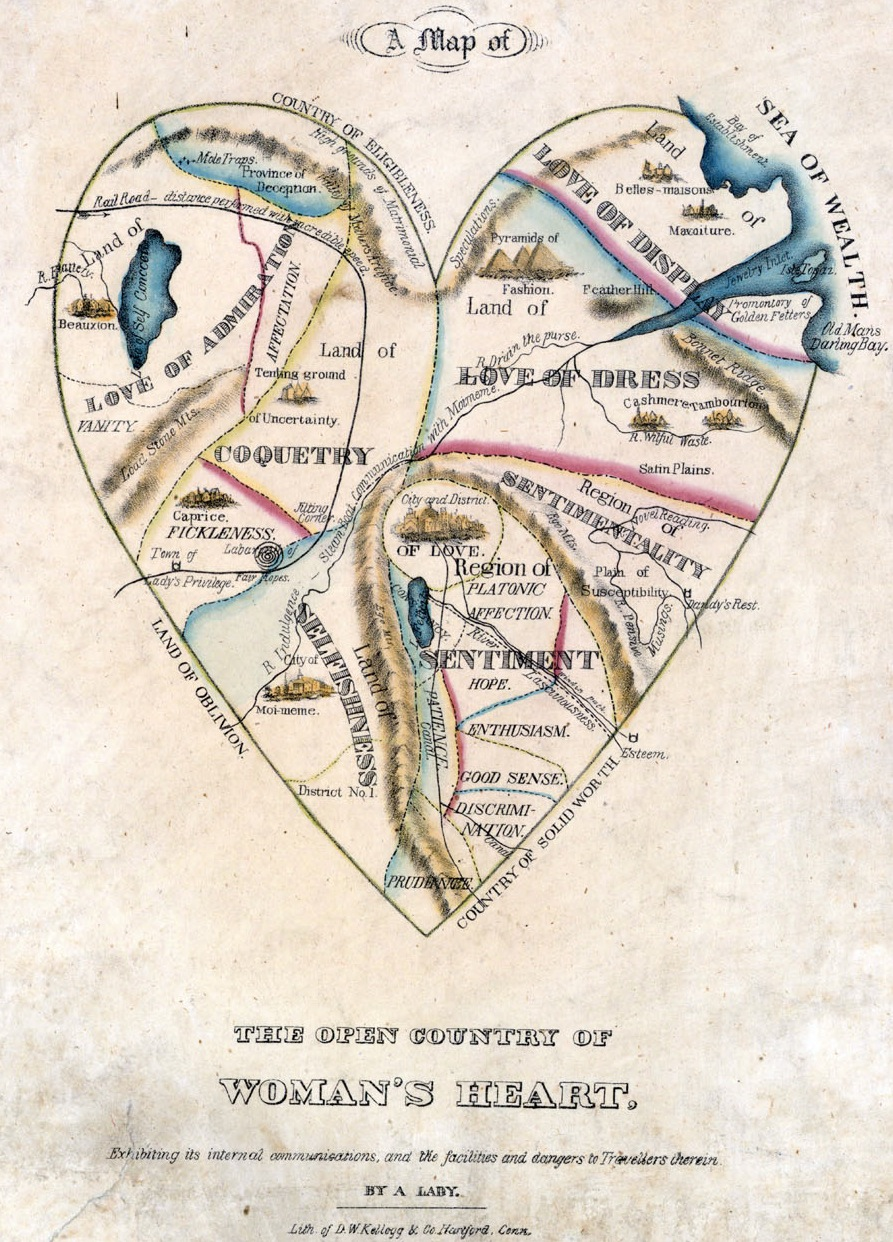
A heart-shaped "Map of Woman's Heart" (1830s)

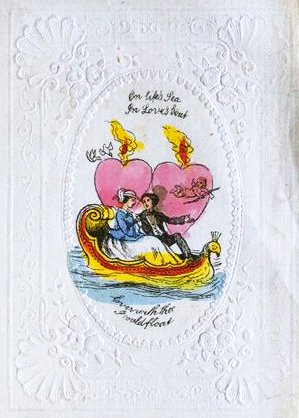
Two burning hearts, coloured pink, illustration on a Victorian-era Valentine's Day card

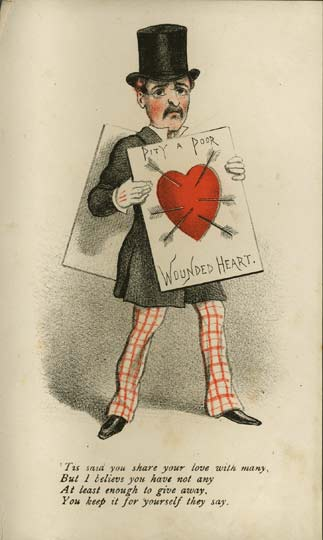
A "Vinegar Valentine" card from the 1870s, with a red heart symbol pierced by six arrows

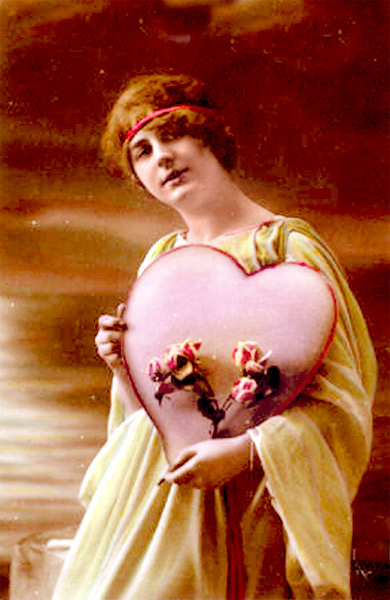
The traditional "heart shape" appears on a 1910 Valentine's Day card.

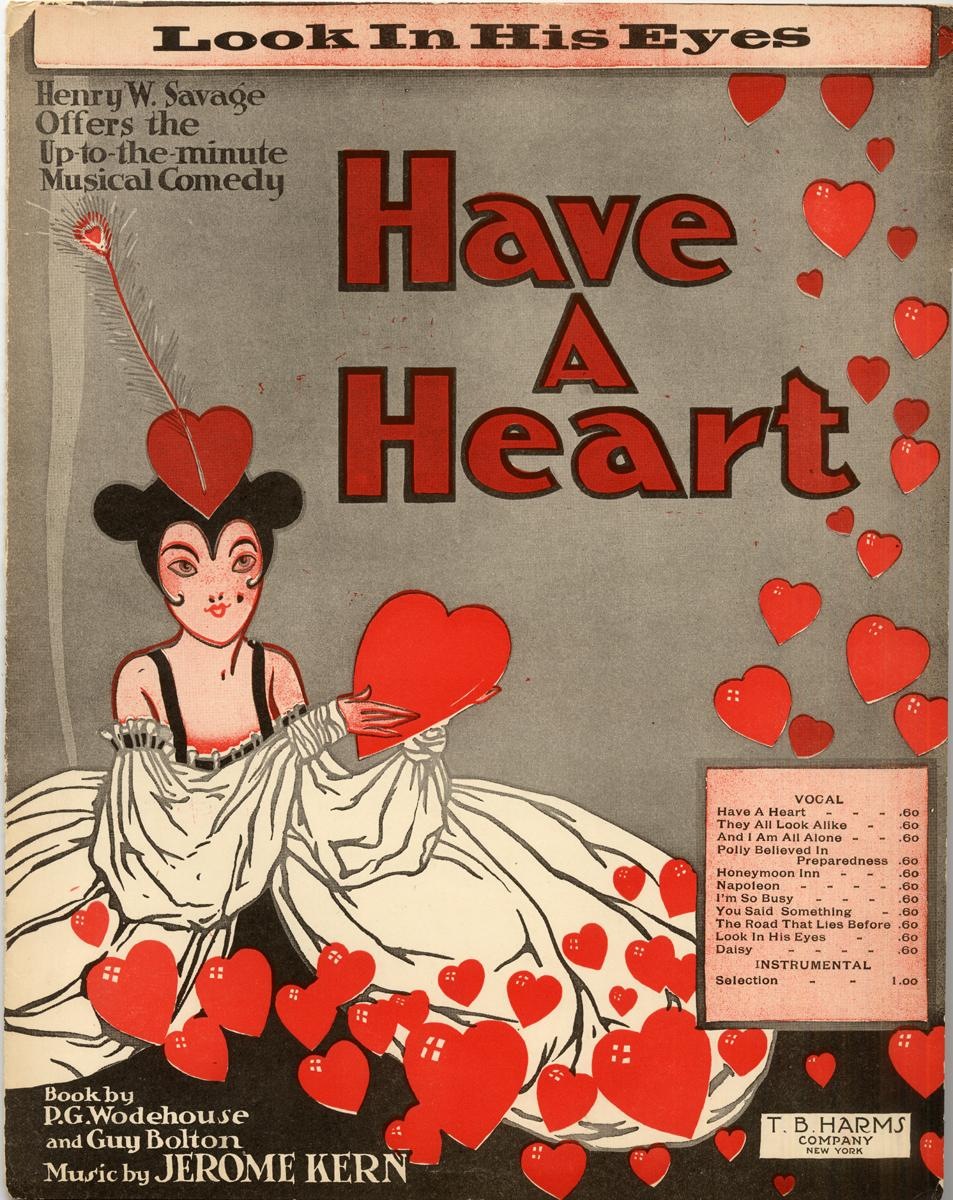
Sheet music cover of "Look in His Eyes", from the musical Have a Heart (1913)

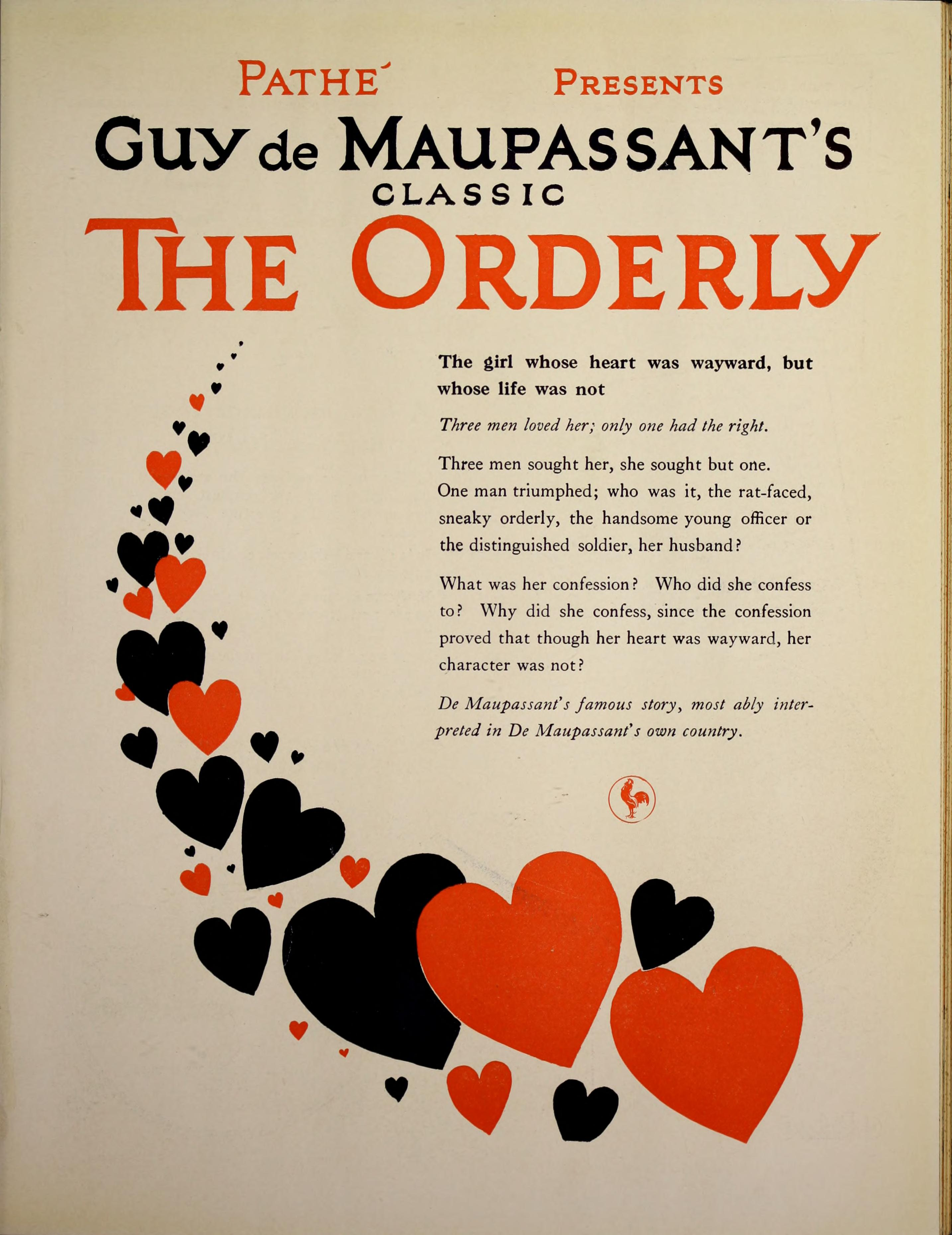
Magazine advertisement for the silent film The Orderly (1921)

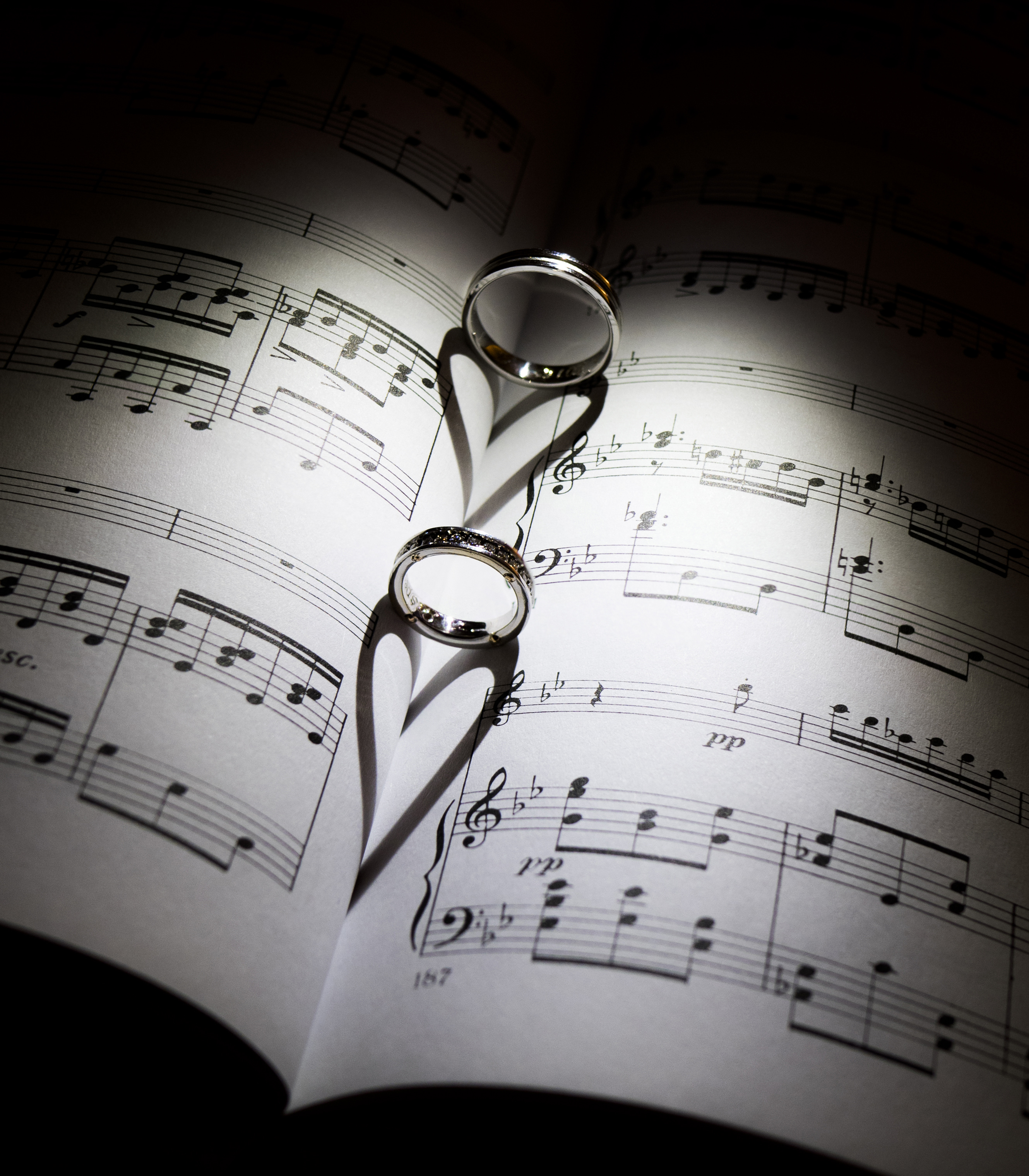
Wedding rings of a groom and bride with shadow in the form of a heart

== Heraldry ==
Coat of arms of the Principality of Lüneburg, originating with William of Winchester, Lord of Lüneburg (d. 1213) who married Helena, daughter of Valdemar I of Denmark, and therefore adopted the "Danish tincture" to the arms of his father, Henry the Lion

A heart pictured in the coat of arms of the Laukaa municipality

The earliest heart-shaped charges in heraldry appear in the 12th century; the hearts in the coat of arms of Denmark go back to the royal banner of the kings of Denmark, in turn based on a seal used as early as the 1190s. However, while the charges are clearly heart-shaped, they did not depict hearts in origin, or symbolize any idea related to love. Instead, they are assumed to have depicted the leaves of the water-lily. Early heraldic heart-shaped charges depicting the leaves of water-lilies are found in various other designs related to territories close to rivers or a coastline (e.g. Flags of Frisia).

Inverted heart symbols have been used in heraldry as stylized testicles (coglioni in Italian) as in the canting arms of the Colleoni family of Milan.

A seal attributed to William, Lord of Douglas (of 1333) shows a heart shape, identified as the heart of Robert the Bruce. The authenticity of this seal is "very questionable", i.e. it could possibly date to the late 14th or even the 15th century.

Heraldic charges actually representing hearts became more common in the early modern period, with the Sacred Heart depicted in ecclesiastical heraldry, and hearts representing love appearing in bourgeois coats of arms. Hearts also later became popular elements in municipal coats of arms.

== Botanical symbolism ==
There has been some conjecture regarding the link between the traditional heart symbol and images of the fruit of silphium, a (probably) extinct plant known to classical antiquity and belonging to the genus Ferula, used as a condiment and medicine, (the medicinal properties including contraceptive and abortifacient activity, linking the plant to sexuality and love). Silver coins from the ancient Libya of the 6th to 5th centuries BC bear images strongly reminiscent of the heart symbol, sometimes accompanied by images of the silphium plant. The related Ferula species asafoetida – which was actually used as an inferior substitute for silphium – is regarded as an aphrodisiac in Tibet and India, suggesting yet a third amatory association relating to silphium.

Ancient silver coin from Cyrene, Libya depicting the heart-shaped "seed" (actually fruit) of silphium

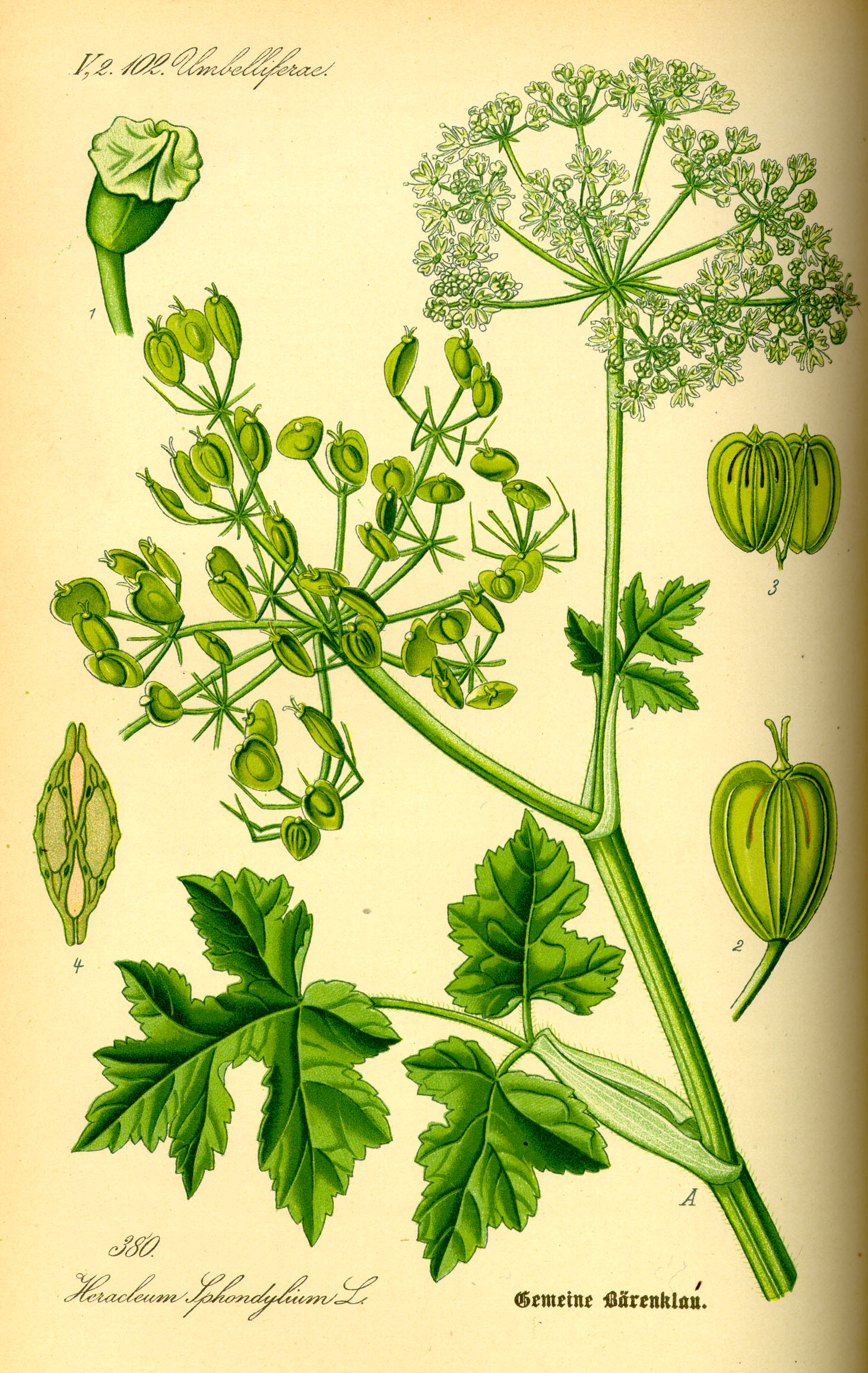
Example of a heart-shaped mericarp fruit in a plant (Heracleum sphondylium) belonging, like the unidentified silphium, to the parsley family, Apiaceae

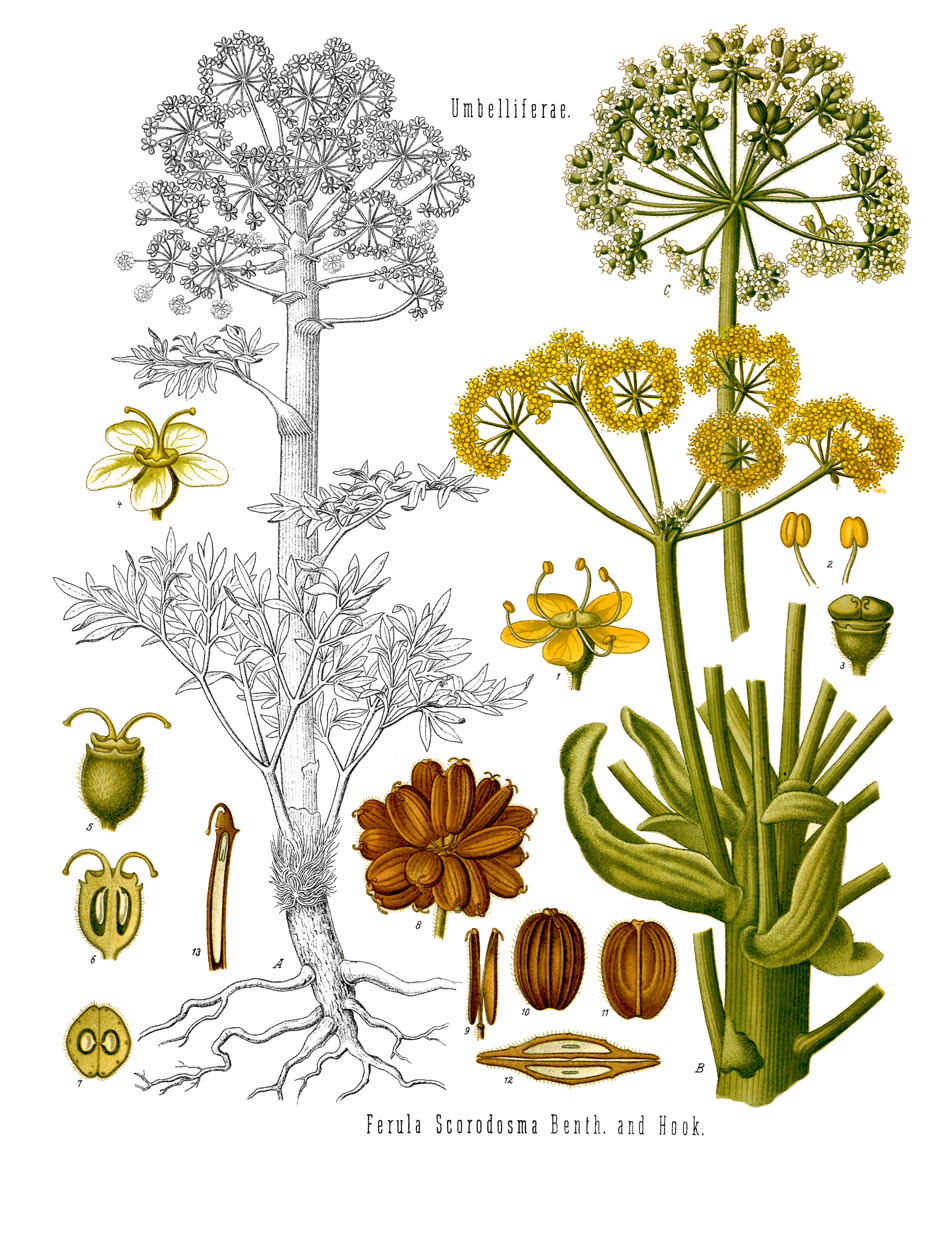
Ferula assa-foetida: a species of giant fennel belonging to the same genus as the ancient silphium and regarded as having similar properties, while being an inferior substitute for the plant

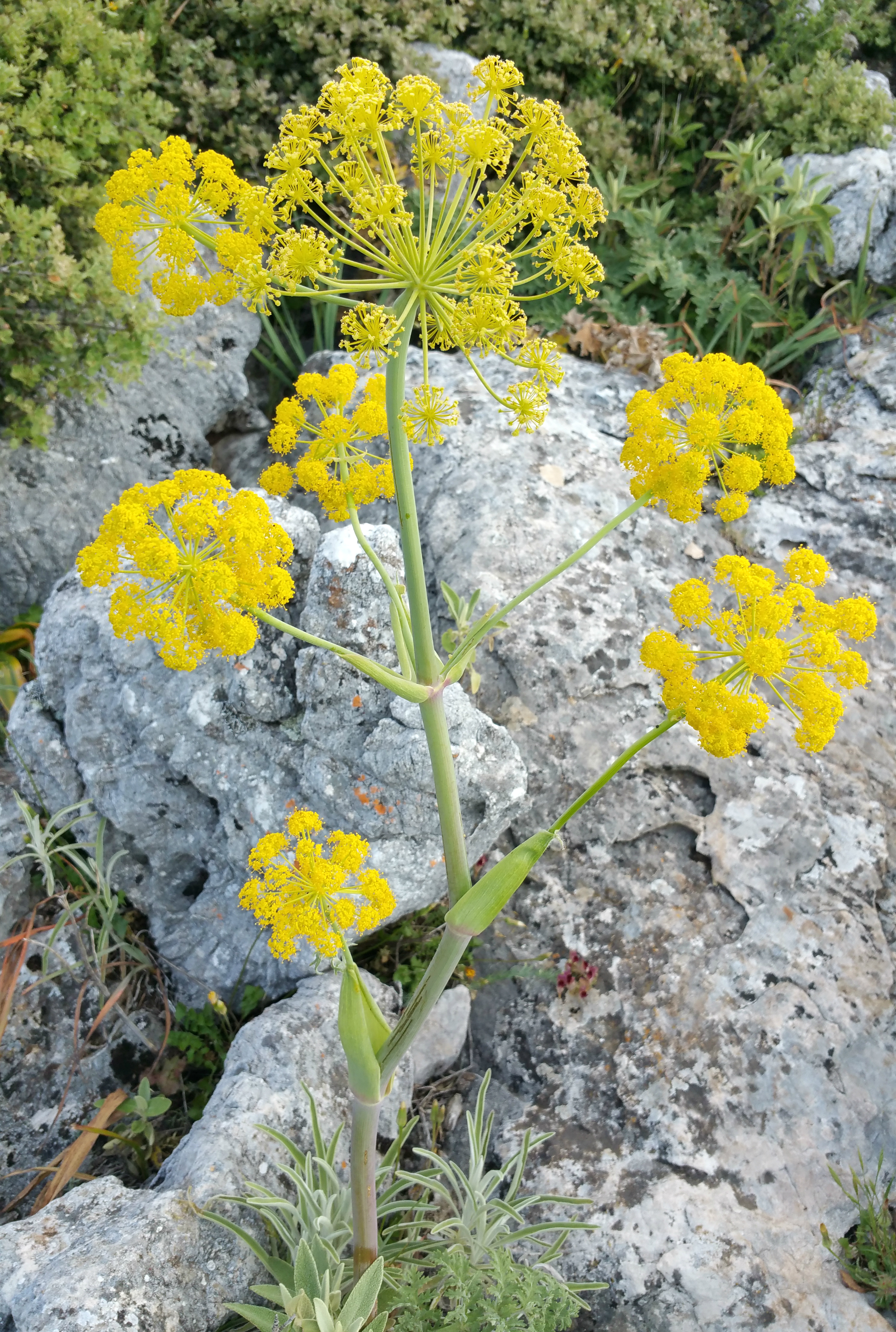
Ferula tingitana: a possible identity for silphium

== Parametrisation ==
A number of parametrisations of approximately heart-shaped curves have been described. The best-known of these is the cardioid, which is an epicycloid with one cusp, though, as the cardioid lacks the point, it may be seen as a stylized water-lily leaf, a so-called seeblatt, rather than a heart. Other curves, such as the implicit curve (x^{2}+y^{2}−1)^{3}−x^{2}y^{3}=0, may produce better approximations of the heart shape.

A cardioid generated by a rolling circle
(animated)

Implicit heart curve
(x^{2} + y^{2} − 1)^{3} − x^{2}y^{3} = 0

Parametric plot of the curve

$\textstyle\binom{16\sin^{\scriptscriptstyle 3}t}{13\cos{}t-5\cos2t-2\cos3t-\cos4t}$

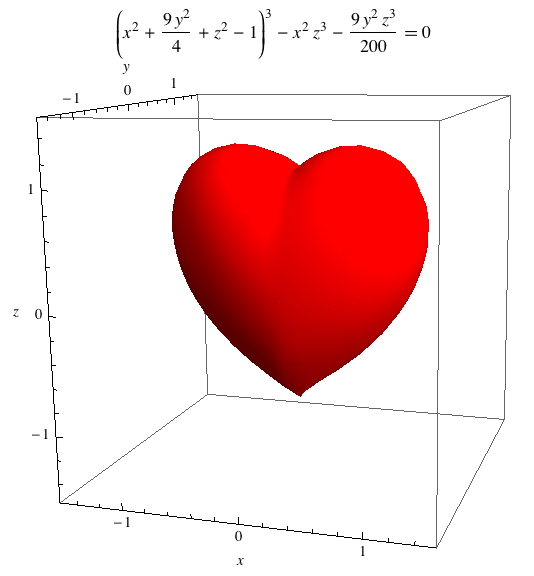
Implicit heart surface

Simple form made from two perpendicular lines and two circular arcs

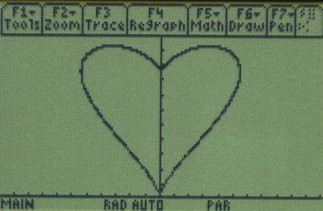
Heart curve on TI-89 graphing calculator

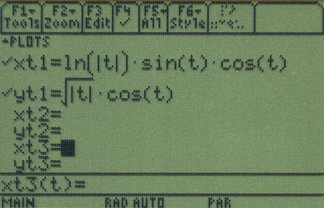
Parametric equation of heart curve on TI-89 graphing calculator

== See also ==
- Cordata, Cordatum and Cordatus, Latin adjectives meaning heart-shaped
- Hand heart
- Heart in hand
- Passion (emotion), or passionate love
- Seeblatt, a symbol of a water lily leaf that resembles a heart
- Werner projection
