= Finger heart =

Hand gesture

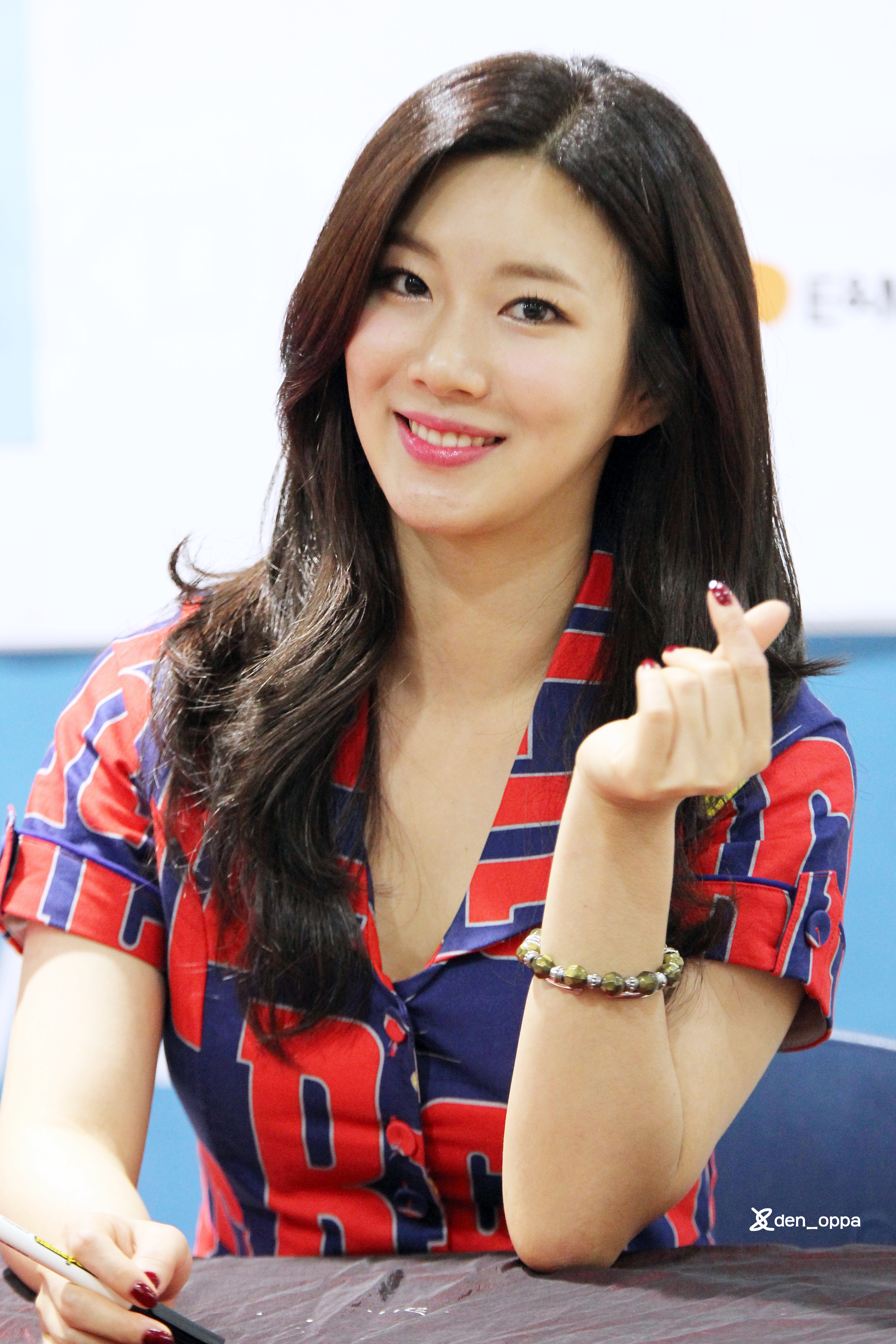
A member of K-pop group Playback performing the finger heart gesture in 2015

The finger heart, (Korean: 손가락 하트, romanized: songarak hateu) also called the Korean finger heart, is a gesture that was popularized in South Korea in the 1990s, in which the index finger and thumb come together like a snap to form a tiny heart. The gesture was popularized by K-pop idols, who would often use the gesture to express their love and gratitude to their fans.

It is represented in Unicode with the codepoint U+1FAF0 🫰 as "Hand with Index Finger and Thumb Crossed".

== Popular usage ==
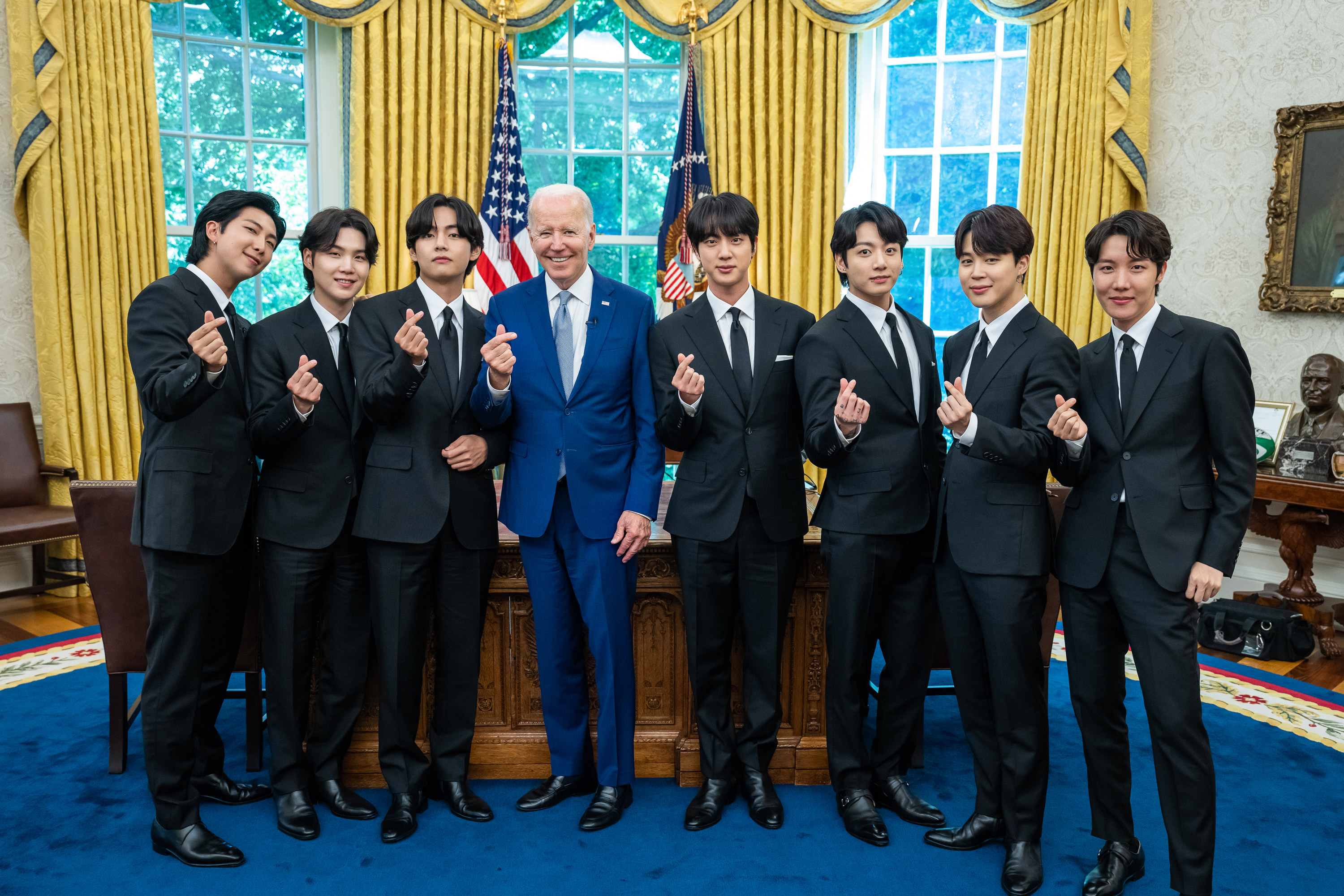
Joe Biden and BTS performing the gesture in 2022

In the 1990s, the finger heart gesture was called the "Timid V" (소심한 브이) in South Korea. This term was used by South Korean baby boomers and Generation X, but as they ended, the MZ generation began to call it the finger heart in the 2000s. By the 2010s, it had become widely accepted in South Korea, and spread to the rest of the world as a part of the Korean Wave. Before the appearance of finger hearts, it was common to make small hearts with two hands or to make large hearts by raising and curving both arms above the head. Heart gestures using both hands and arms also have been performed worldwide, but finger hearts are also called Korean Finger Hearts because of its association with the rise of South Korean pop culture.

In South Korea, it is a popular symbol among Korean celebrities (namely actors and singers) and their fans, and popularly performed using the thumb and index finger.

Although various instances of finger hearts may be found from before 2010 (namely in K-pop musician G-Dragon's childhood photo), finger hearts are considered to have been first popularized by actress Kim Hye-soo then in the K-pop community by Infinite's Nam Woohyun in 2011.

The thumb and index finger gesture has become popular across Asia due to the popularity of K-pop and Korean dramas. Notable South Korean celebrities – including G-Dragon and PSY – as well as groups including Exo and BTS, have popularized the gesture to a wider international audience.

During the 2018 Winter Olympics in Pyeongchang, The North Face provided gloves with highlighted thumb and index finger sleeves to highlight this symbol.

In 2021 the finger heart was added to Unicode 14.0 and Emoji 14.0 with the codepoint U+1FAF0 🫰 HAND WITH INDEX FINGER AND THUMB CROSSED as "Hand with Index Finger and Thumb Crossed".

== See also ==
- Hand heart
- Heart in hand
