= Roman de la poire =

Medieval French work by Thibaut

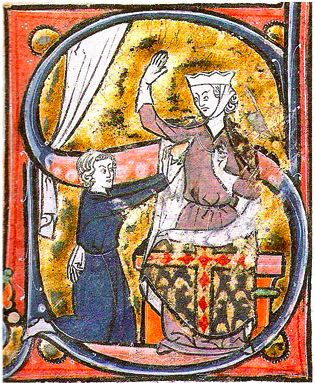
- Illustration from fol. 41 of Ms. fr. 2186, the kneeling man is an allegory of Doux Regard ("sweet gaze") handing the damsel the lover's heart. This is the earliest known depiction of the human heart in a metaphorical context signifying "romantic love", which over the next two centuries would give rise to the now-familiar heart symbol.
- Language: Old French
- Date: 13th century
- Manuscript(s): BnF Ms. fr. 2186; Ms. fr. 12786; Ms. fr. 24431
- Genre: Chivalric romance

Le roman de la poire (Li romanz de la poire, "Romance of the Pear") is a medieval French (13th century) romance by a certain Thibaut. It is influenced by the Roman de la Rose in describing the onset of love in terms of allegory and in its frequent use of the first person. The title is derived from a central scene where the damsel shares a pear which she has peeled with her teeth with the lover.

The text is preserved in BnF Ms. fr. 2186, an illuminated manuscript dated to the 1250s. It was illustrated in the workshop of the maître de Bari (so named after a gradual now at San Nicola, Bari), which is known to have been active in Paris during the 1250s. The text itself would on internal evidence be dated to between about 1230 and 1285, so that it is rather certain that the manuscript is the one used for the original presentation of the text and that the text's composition dates to the mid 13th century (Tesnière 1987). The manuscript extends to 83 folia, measuring 205 x 135 mm. It includes nine full-page miniatures and 18 historiated initials. The full-page miniatures depict famous lovers from literature, including Tristan and Isolde, Cliges and Fenice, Pyramus and Thisbe and Paris and Helen.

The work presumably enjoyed limited success, and its reception did not extend beyond the early 14th century. Two copies of the original text survive, dated to the late 13th or early 14th century (Ms. fr. 12786 and Ms. fr. 24431). A fragment of a further copy from about the same time was published in 1982 by Richard O'Gorman.
