= Heart Book =

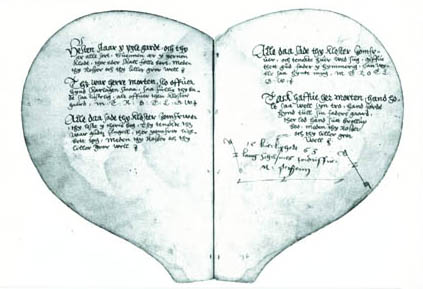

The so-called Heart Book (Hjertebog, Copenhagen, Kongelige Bibliotek, Thott 1510, 4º) is a 16th-century Danish manuscript (Thott 1510 4^{o}), now kept in Det Kongelige Bibliotek, Copenhagen.

It is a collection of 83 Danish love ballads, collected in the 1550s at the court of king Christian III. It is the oldest known Danish ballad manuscript.

A peculiarity of the manuscript is that the entire book is heart shaped - one of the earliest examples of the heart shape being used to signify romantic love.

== See also ==
- 16th-century Danish literature
