= Heart in hand =

Symbol of charity

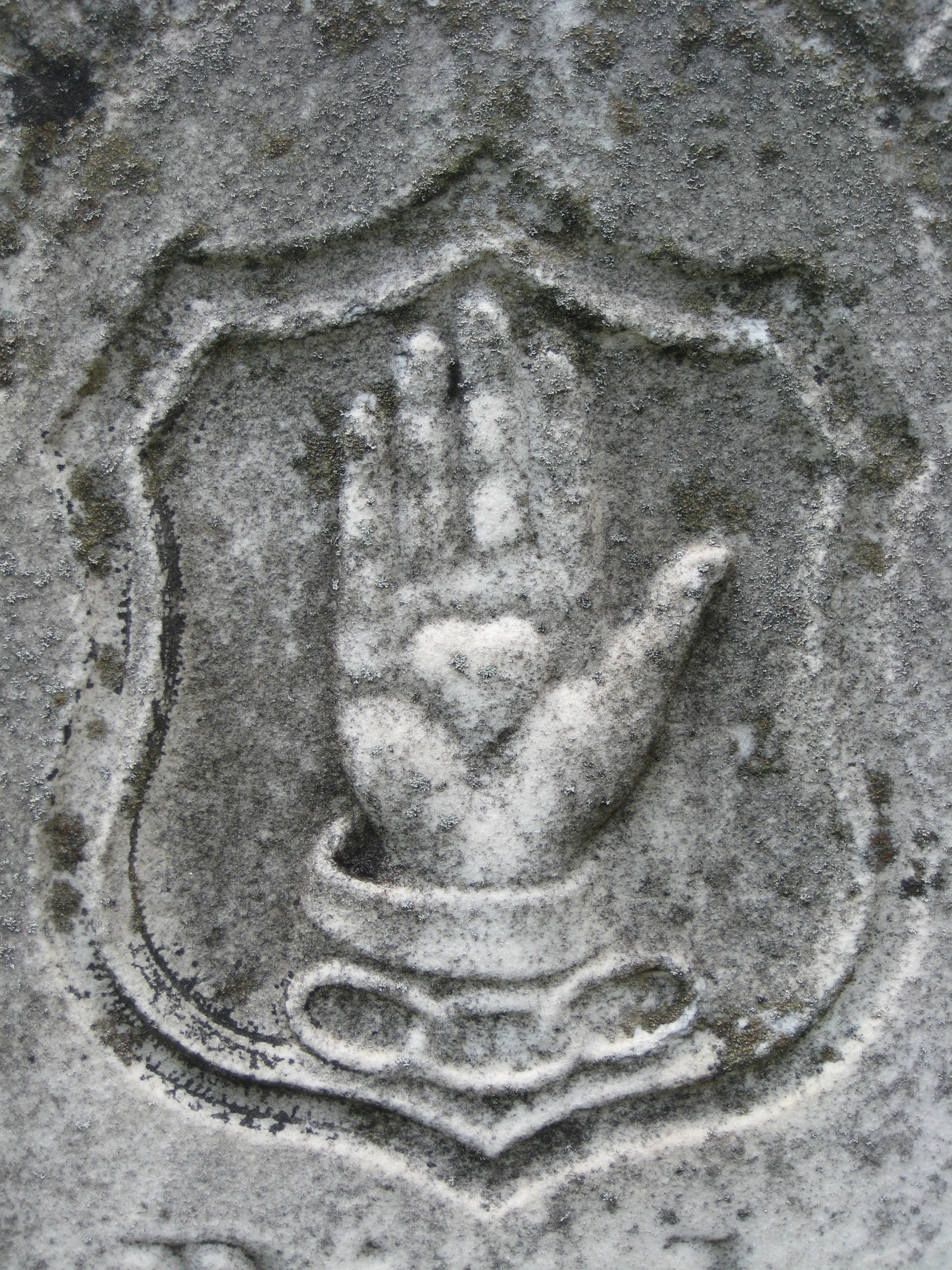
Detail of a gravestone in Indian Mound Cemetery in Romney, West Virginia, United States

The heart in hand or heart-in-hand is a symbol of a heart in an open palm, and is symbolic of charity, given from the heart. It is an easily recognizable symbol in the Northeastern United States and used by the Shakers as a pictorial reminder of the words of Mother Ann Lee, the founder of the Shaker sect, who promoted a simple life of hard work and spirituality, "Put your hands to work, and your hearts to God." The image is typical of the Shaker attitude, and also implies a loving welcome.

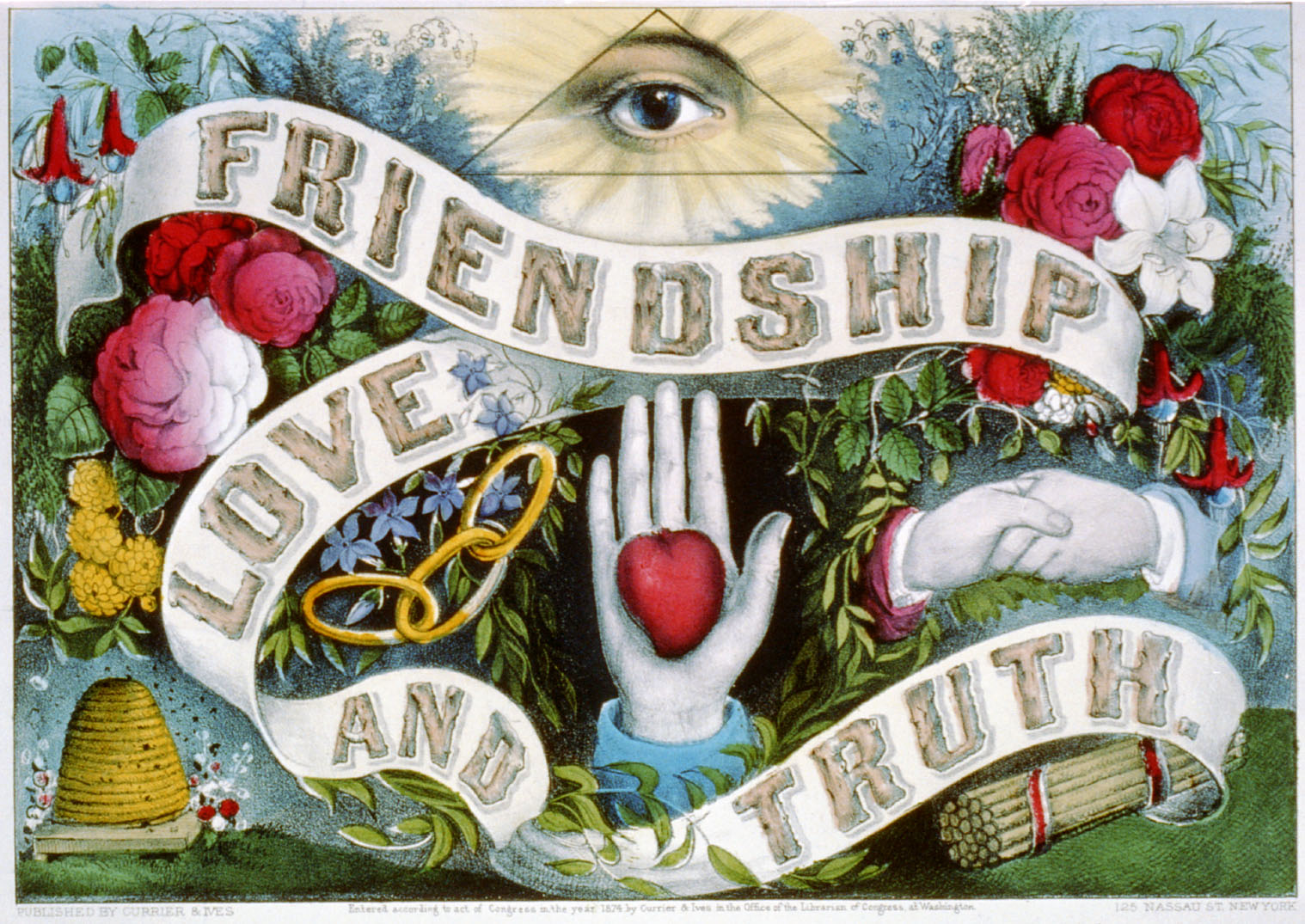
Currier and Ives print from c1874: "Friendship, Love, and Truth"

A heart in hand has also been a symbol of the Independent Order of Odd Fellows, a fraternal organization derived from English Oddfellows orders of the mid-18th century. These commonly display three linked rings representing friendship, love, and truth.

The symbol originated as the seal of the Protestant Reformer John Calvin, and thus appears in the official seal of Calvin University with Calvin's motto, "My heart I offer to you LORD, promptly and sincerely."

The symbol is also frequently associated with Amish communities.

The symbol was also used as a chop mark in the woodblock prints of Gustave Baumann (Germ./Amer. 1881-1971).

== See also ==
- Religious symbolism
- Hand heart – Affectionate hand gesture
