= Hand heart =

Affectionate hand gesture

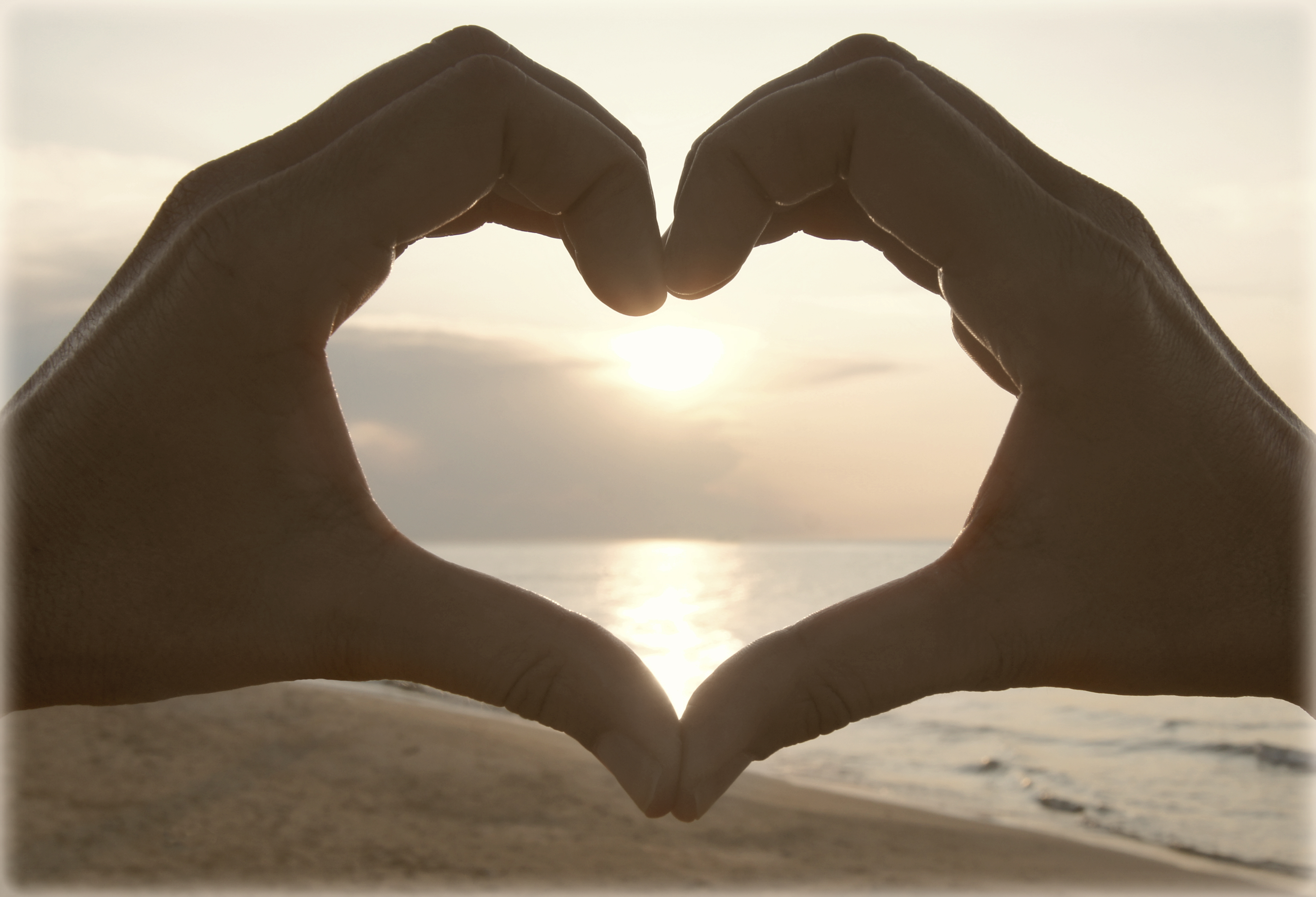
Hand heart

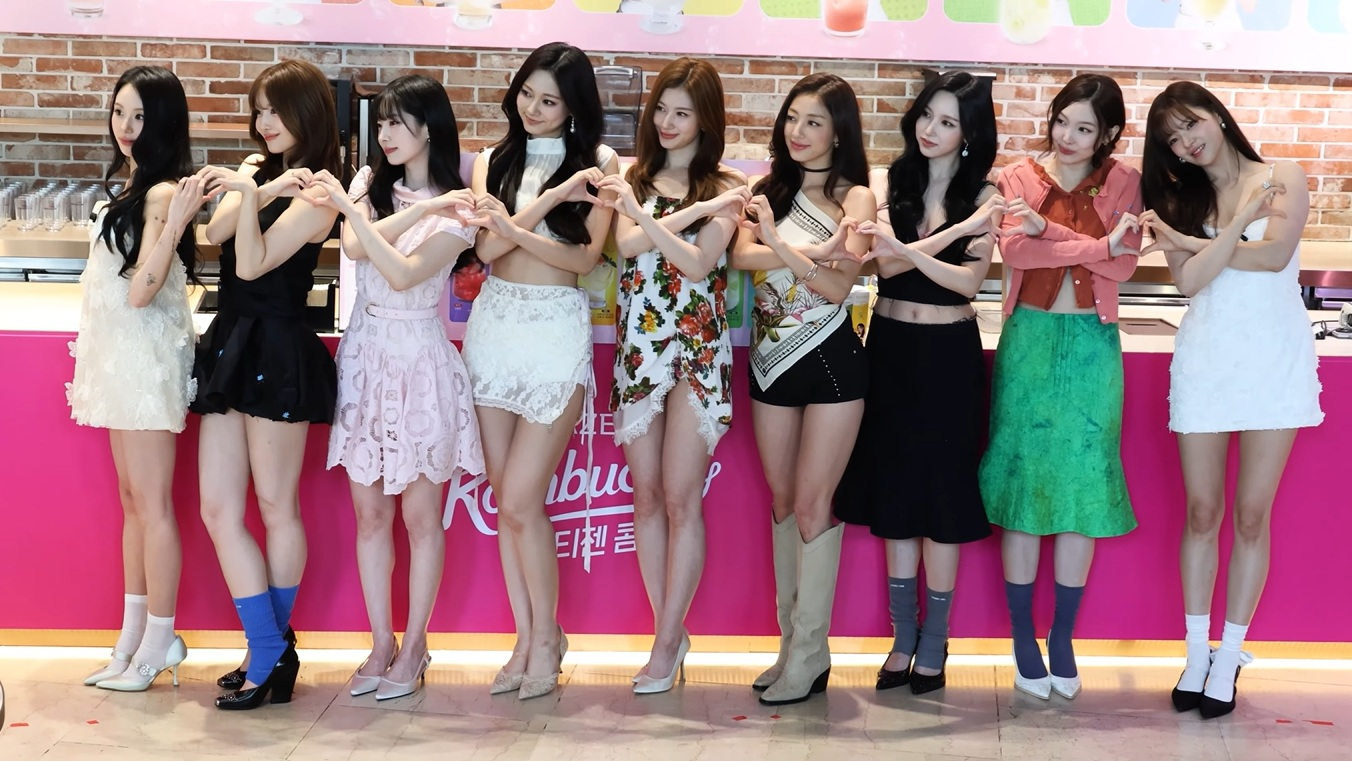
Members of South Korean girl group Twice making hand hearts together.

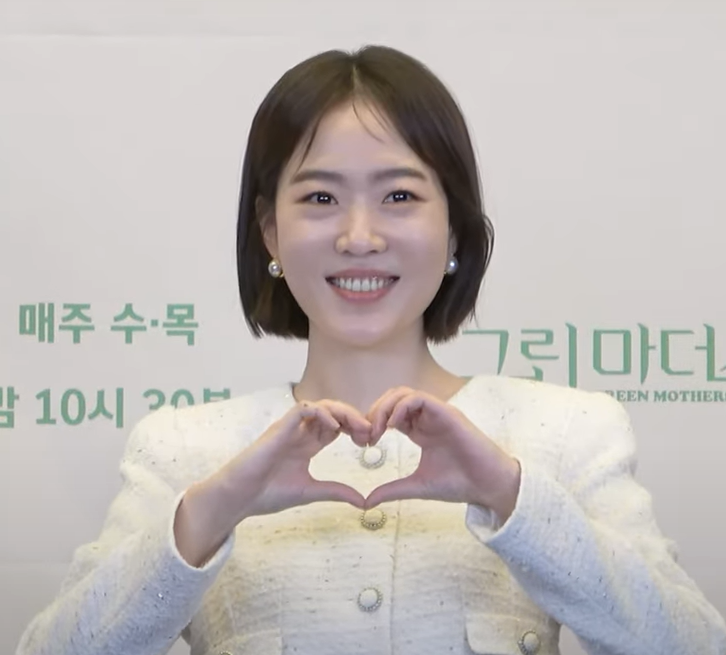
South korean actress Joo Min-kyung showing a hand heart

A hand heart is a gesture in which a person forms a heart shape using their fingers.

The "hand heart" is typically formed by one using both thumbs to form the bottom of the heart, while bending the remaining fingers and having them connect at the fingernails in order to form a heart shape.

Often, two people will each form half of a heart, conjoining the two as a sign of affection.

The upside down hand heart gesture is regarded as first being used in modern art in 1989, by Italian artist Maurizio Cattelan, who created an art image of the gesture as his first artwork named Family Syntax. The gesture gained popularity between the mid 2000s-early 2010s. Since early in her career, Taylor Swift has used the gesture in conjunction with her concert performances, most notably during the bridge during her song "Fearless", from her 2008 album of the same name. This gesture was added to Unicode 14.0 and Emoji 14.0 in 2021 with code point U+1FAF6 🫶 HEART HANDS.

The gesture and symbol has been seen widely used in Korean K-Dramas and has several variations including forming the heart-shape by curving the thumbs to form the top of the heart and the remaining fingers of both hands joining to form the bottom of the heart. However, in recent years, the practice has evolved so that some people use the index and middle fingers to form the heart, rather than the entire hand; this variation is then called a finger heart. The classic Korean thumb-and-index finger gesture is also a different finger heart.

== Google patent ==
Google filed a patent in July 2011 that allowed Google Glass users to use the hand heart in front of an object to cause the gadget to automatically recognise the object, take a picture, and send it to social networks as a "liked" image.

== See also ==
- Finger heart
- Heart symbol
- ILY sign
