= Vinegar valentines =

Type of cheeky postcard

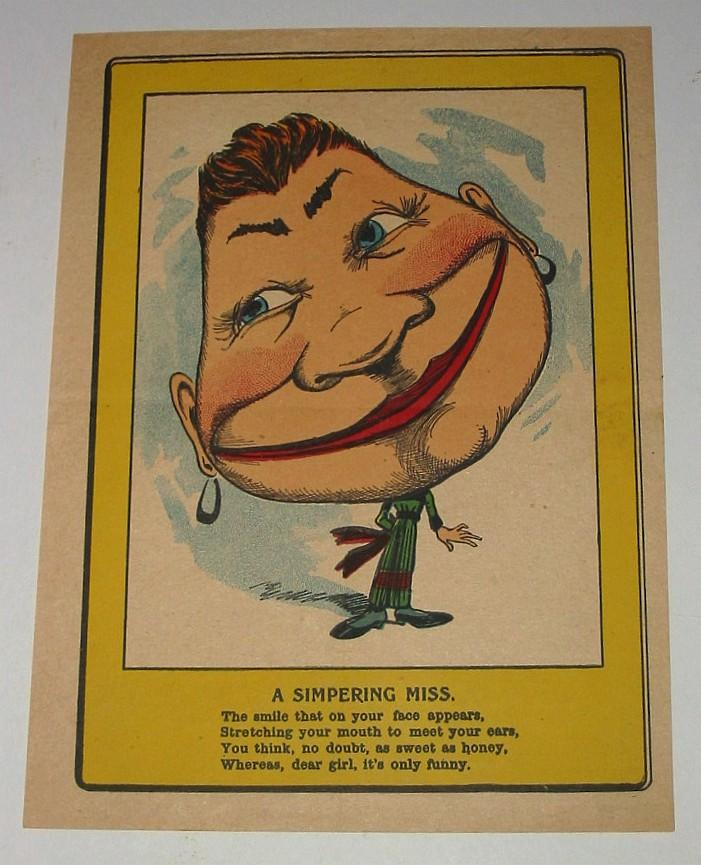
Vinegar Valentine, circa 1900

Vinegar valentines were a type of cheeky postcard decorated with a caricature and insulting poem. A lampoon of Valentine's Day cards, the unflattering novelty items enjoyed a century of popularity beginning in the 1840s during the Victorian era.

These cynical, sarcastic, often mean-spirited cards were first produced in America by a variety of printing companies, including Elton, Fisher, Strong and Turner. By the 1870s, other entrepreneurs such as New York printer, John McLoughlin, and his cartoonist, Charles Howard were creating their own lines of cards. While different European companies also produced the humorous cards in the early 19th century, one of the most prestigious firms to create them around 1900 was Raphael Tuck & Sons, "Publishers to Their Majesties the King and Queen of England".

Cheaply made, vinegar valentines were usually printed on one side of a single sheet of paper and cost only a penny. Some people mistakenly call them penny dreadfuls, but that term refers to a form of potboiler fiction. They often featured garish caricatures of men like the "Dude" or women like the "Floozy." One reason they rapidly became popular throughout America and Europe was because literacy rates were increasing at that time among the poor and working classes who rarely had much more than a penny to spend on such luxuries. But, according to noted valentine authority Nancy Rosin, president of the National Valentine Collectors Association, their use wasn't restricted to the lower economic classes.

The unflattering cards reportedly created a stir throughout all social levels, sometimes provoking fisticuffs and arguments. The receiver, not the sender, was responsible for the cost of postage up until the 1840s. A person in those days paid for the privilege of being insulted by an often anonymous "admirer." Millions of vinegar valentines, with verses that insulted a person's looks, intelligence, or occupation, were sold between the 19th and 20th centuries. Art and design historian Annebella Pollen has extensively researched their production and reception in Britain, where they were more commonly called 'mock' or 'mocking' valentines.

The cards are usually simply a sheet of thin, colored paper, about the size of a modern greeting card. They were later also produced in the form of postcards. They were usually sent anonymously. Postmasters sometimes confiscated these cards as unfit to be mailed.

== In popular culture ==
One pop culture reference to vinegar valentines is found in the Bill Watterson comic strip Calvin and Hobbes, where Calvin has given Susie Derkins the cards.
