= Cordata =

Cordata, a Latin adjective meaning heart-shaped, may refer to:

- cordate, a common leaf shape
- Cordata (company), an American personal computer company

== Species ==
- Alnus cordata, a species of alder
- Houttuynia cordata, a flowering plant native to Southeast Asia
- Macleaya cordata, a species of poppy
- Prunus subcordata, a shrub in the plum family
- Pyrus cordata, a tree in the pear family
- Quararibea cordata, a fruit tree native to the Amazon Rainforest
- Tilia cordata, known as the small-leaved lime or linden
- Eucnide cordata, a perennial shrub in the family Loasaceae native to the Sonoran Desert Region

== See also ==
- Cordatum, a species of sea urchin
- Chordate, a phylum of animals having a dorsal nerve cord
