= Bellingwedde =

- Municipality
- Flag Coat of arms Logo

- Location of Bellingwedde (green) in Groningen (dark grey) and the Netherlands (grey)
- Coordinates: 53°7′N 7°9′E
- Country: Netherlands
- Province: Groningen
- Established: 1 September 1968
- Disestablished: 1 January 2018

Area
  - Total: 110.08 km^{2} (42.50 sq mi)
  - Land: 108.39 km^{2} (41.85 sq mi)
  - Water: 1.69 km^{2} (0.65 sq mi)
- Elevation: 1 m (3.3 ft)

Population (2021)
  - Total: data missing
- Time zone: UTC+1 (CET)
  - Summer (DST): UTC+2 (CEST)
- Postcode: 9566, 9695–9699
- Area code: 0597
- Website: www.bellingwedde.nl

Bellingwedde (Dutch pronunciation: [ˌbɛlɪŋˈʋɛdə]) was a municipality in the province Groningen in the northeast of the Netherlands. Bellingwedde was established in 1968, when the municipalities of Bellingwolde and Wedde merged. After almost 50 years, Bellingwedde was disestablished in 2018, when the municipalities of Bellingwedde and Vlagtwedde merged into Westerwolde.

== Etymology ==
The name Bellingwedde is a portmanteau of Bellingwolde and Wedde, which are the names of the two municipalities that were merged in 1968 to form Bellingwedde. At the time, three names were considered for the new municipality: Bellingewedde, proposed by the province of Groningen, Bellingwolde-Wedde, proposed by the municipal council of Bellingwolde, and Bellingwedde, proposed by the municipal council of Wedde. The province selected the last option, which was eventually also accepted by the municipal council of Bellingwolde.

== History ==
On 1 September 1968, the municipality of Bellingwedde was formed by merging the municipalities of Bellingwolde and Wedde.

Henk Eijsink of the Labour Party, who was the last mayor of Bellingwolde and acting mayor of Wedde, became the first mayor of Bellingwedde in 1968–1970. He was followed by Jurjen Jan Hoeksema (Labour; 1970–1978), Engbert Drenth (Labour; 1979–2007), Erik Triemstra (Christian Democratic Appeal; 2007–2013) and Janneke Snijder-Hazelhoff (People's Party for Freedom and Democracy; 2013–2018).

The municipality merged with Vlagtwedde into the new municipality of Westerwolde on 1 January 2018.

== Geography ==
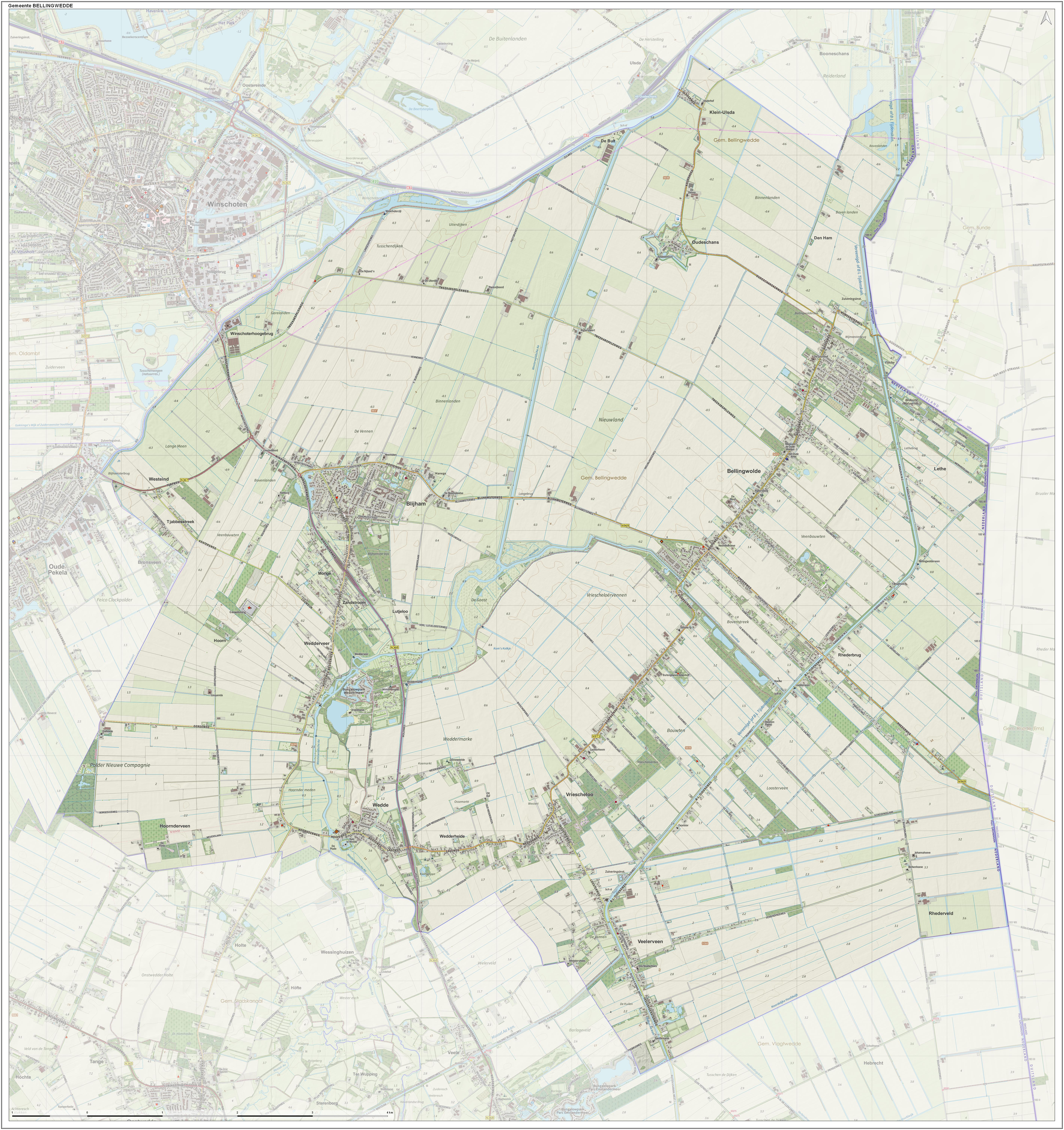
2015 map of Bellingwedde

Bellingwedde is located at 53°7′N 7°9′E in the east of the province of Groningen, in the northeast of the Netherlands on the border with Germany. It is in the south of the region of Oldambt and in the north of the region of Westerwolde.

Bellingwedde is bordered by the Dutch municipalities of Oldambt (in the north), Pekela (west), Stadskanaal (south-west), and Vlagtwedde (south), and by the German municipalities of Rhede (south-east) and Bunde (north-east). The nearest city is Winschoten.

The municipality contains the villages Bellingwolde, Blijham, Oudeschans, Veelerveen, Vriescheloo, and Wedde. It also contains the hamlets Den Ham, Klein-Ulsda, Rhederbrug, and Wedderveer.

The north border of Bellingwedde follows the river Pekel Aa. The river Westerwoldse Aa crosses the east of Bellingwedde from south to north. The canal B.L. Tijdenskanaal, that unites the Mussel-Aa-kanaal and the Ruiten-Aa-kanaal in the south, crosses the west of Bellingwedde from south to north.

== Governance ==
The municipal building is located at the Hoofdweg in Wedde.

A municipal government in the Netherlands consists of the executive college of the mayor and aldermen and the elected municipal council.

Janneke Snijder-Hazelhoff of the People's Party for Freedom and Democracy, appointed in 2013, was the last mayor of Bellingwedde.

The municipal council had 13 members. In the 2014 election, the last prior to merger, turnout was 57.57% with 4,191 valid votes. The results are shown in the table below: A coalition was formed between the Labour Party (PvdA), the Christian Democratic Appeal (CDA), and the People's Party for Freedom and Democracy (VVD). All three parties had one alderman in the college of mayor and aldermen. Although the Socialist Party got the most votes, it is not part of the coalition.

2014 municipal election
Party	Votes	%	Seats
Socialist Party	1,116	26.63	3
Labour Party	853	20.35	3
Christian Democratic Appeal	572	13.65	2
People's Party for Freedom and Democracy	531	12.67	2
GreenLeft	493	11.76	1
Plaatselijk Belang Bellingwedde	355	8.47	1
Westerwolde Lokaal	271	6.47	1
Total	4,191	100	13

Bellingwedde was twinned with Rhede in Germany in 1979 and Nowogród Bobrzański in Poland in 2004.

== Demographics ==
Historical population
Year	Pop.	±%
1970	8,871	—
1975	8,885	+0.2%
1980	9,429	+6.1%
1985	9,380	−0.5%
1990	9,416	+0.4%
1995	9,476	+0.6%
2000	9,549	+0.8%
2005	9,694	+1.5%
2010	9,261	−4.5%
2015	9,154	−1.2%
Source: Statistics Netherlands

Since 1968, when the municipality was established, Bellingwedde had a population between 8,561 and 9,748. In 2015, it had a population of 9,154 and a population density of 84/km^{2} (220/sq mi).

== Attractions ==
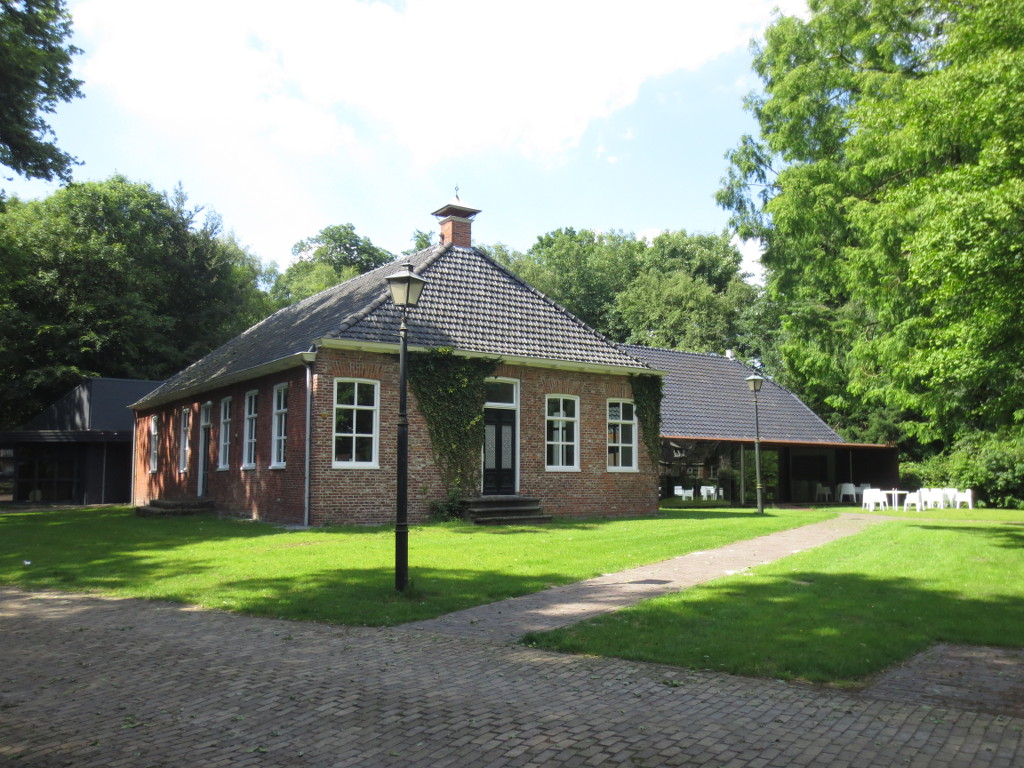
Museum de Oude Wolden in Bellingwolde

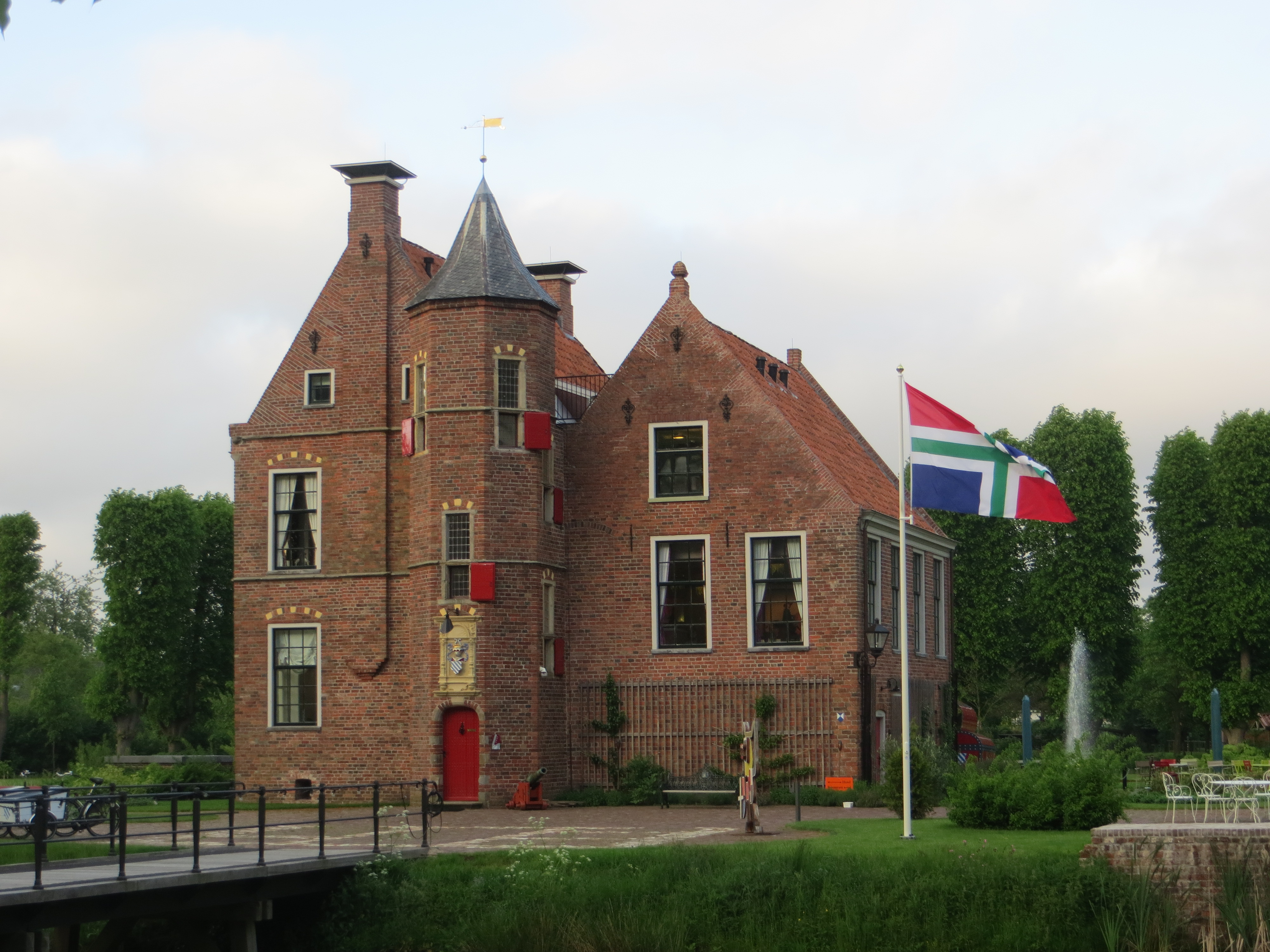
Wedderborg in Wedde

Two villages have a state protected village area (Dutch: beschermd dorpsgezicht), Oudeschans since 1991 and Bellingwolde since 2009.

There are two museums in Bellingwedde. Museum de Oude Wolden in Bellingwolde is a regional museum about the art and history of Oldambt and Westerwolde. It has temporary exhibitions and a permanent exhibition with paintings of Lodewijk Bruckman from the municipal collection of Bellingwedde. Vestingmuseum Oudeschans in Oudeschans is a history museum about the fortification of Oudeschans. It has a collection of archaeological findings from the 17th and 18th century on display.

There are five windmills in the municipality: De Korenbloem in Vriescheloo, Niemans Molen in Veelerveen, Spinnenkop Wedderveer in Wedderveer, Veldkamps Meuln in Bellingwolde, and Weddermarke in Wedde.

The Wedderborg is a borg, a type of castle from the province of Groningen, in Wedde. The building has 14th, 15th, and 16th-century elements and is currently used as a hotel and restaurant.

== Infrastructure ==
=== Roads ===
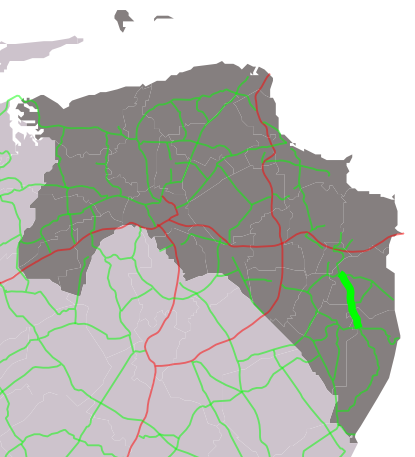
The location of the N368 in the province of Groningen

There are no highways in Bellingwedde. The nearest highway is the A7 (E22) directly north of the municipality and which is connected to Groningen in the west and Leer (Germany) in the east; its nearest access point is exit 48 (Oudeschans).

There are four provincial roads in the municipality. In the northwest, the N367 connects the municipality to Winschoten and Oude and Nieuwe Pekela. The N368 runs from northwest to southwest, connects Blijham via Wedde to Vlagtwedde, and also connects to the other three major roads. The N969 runs from west to southeast and connects Blijham via Bellingwolde and Rhederbrug to Rhede in Germany. And the N973 runs from southwest to the center and connects Wedde via Vriescheloo to Bellingwolde.

=== Public transport ===
There are also no railways in Bellingwedde. The nearest railway stations are Winschoten and Bad Nieuweschans on the Harlingen–Nieuweschans railway just north of Bellingwedde. The railway is connected to the Groningen railway station and the rest of the Dutch railway network in the west and to the Leer railway station and the German railway network in the east.

The bus lines passing through Bellingwedde are exploited by Qbuzz (places in Bellingwedde are in italics):

- Line 11: Winschoten – Blijham – Wedderveer – Wedde – Veele – Vlagtwedde – Bourtange
- Line 12: Winschoten – Blijham – Bellingwolde – Blijham – Winschoten
- Line 14: Stadskanaal – Alteveer – Tange – Onstwedde – Barlage – Smeerling – Vlagtwedde – Veele – Wedde – Wedderveer – Blijham – Winschoten
- Line 811: Bad Nieuweschans – Klein-Ulsda – Oudeschans – Bellingwolde – Vriescheloo – Veelerveen – Vlagtwedde

== Education ==
There are four preschools, seven primary schools, and one secondary school in Bellingwedde. There are no institutes of tertiary education in the municipality.

== Media ==
Het Streekblad is a free door-to-door weekly newspaper in the municipalities of Bellingwedde, Oldambt, and Pekela. Dagblad van het Noorden is a daily newspaper in the northern provinces of the Netherlands.

Radio Westerwolde is a radio channel in the municipalities of Bellingwedde, Pekela, and Vlagtwedde.

== Notable people ==
- Jan Mulder (born 1945 in Bellingwolde), footballer, writer, and commentator
