= Coat of arms of Bellingwedde =

The coat of arms of Bellingwedde

The coat of arms of Bellingwedde is an official symbol of the municipality of Bellingwedde in the province of Groningen in the Netherlands. It was officially adopted in 1969. The coat of arms consists of a crowned shield with blue, gold, and silver elements, which refer to the abbey Palmar and the Wedderborg. From 2018, the coat of arms is no longer in use as a municipal coat of arms because the municipality of Bellingwedde merged into the new municipality of Westerwolde.

== History ==
The municipality of Bellingwedde was established when the municipalities of Bellingwolde and Wedde were merged in 1968. The coat of arms of the new municipality was adopted by Royal Decree on 22 April 1969.

== Description ==
The escutcheon is gyronny of eight azure and or. The azure gyrons contain a fleur-de-lis or pointing outward from the escutcheon's center. The inescutcheon is bendy azure and argent. The escutcheon has a coronet or with three leaves and two pearls.

The escutcheon and inescutcheon of the coat of arms of Bellingwedde are based on elements of the former coats of arms of Bellingwolde and Wedde.

The coat of arms of Bellingwolde had an image of Palmar, a nearby Premonstratensian abbey that disappeared in the Dollard in 1520. Instead of using this image, the escutcheon in the coat of arms of Bellingwedde is based on the colors, azure and or, and the fleurs-de-lis from the coat of arms of the Premonstratensian order.

The coat of arms of Wedde had an image of the Wedderborg. This image was also not used, instead the escutcheon of the coat of arms of Georg Schenck van Toutenburg, a 16th-century lord of the Wedderborg, was used as the inescutcheon of the coat of arms of Bellingwedde.

Coat of arms of Bellingwolde

Coat of arms of the Premonstratensian Order

Coat of arms of Wedde

Coat of arms of Georg Schenck van Toutenburg
