= Provincial road N368 (Netherlands) =

Highway in the Netherlands

Provincial highway 368
- Provinciale weg 368
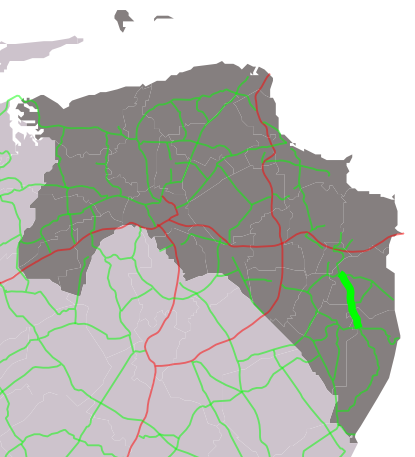

Route information
- Length: 11 km (6.8 mi)

Major junctions
- North end: N367 in Blijham
- N969 in Blijham; N973 in Wedde
- South end: N365/N976 in Vlagtwedde

Location
- Country: Kingdom of the Netherlands
- Constituent country: Netherlands

Highway system
- Roads in the Netherlands; Motorways; E-roads; Provincial; City routes

The N368 is a provincial road in the province of Groningen in the Netherlands. It runs from Blijham in the municipality of Westerwolde to Vlagtwedde in the same municipality.

== Route description ==
The provincial road N368 is 11 kilometres (6.8 mi) long. It starts in Blijham in the municipality of Westerwolde, it runs south via Wedde in the same municipality, and ends in Vlagtwedde also in the same municipality.

== Junction and exit list ==
| Province | Municipality | km | mi | Destinations | Notes |
|---|---|---|---|---|---|
| Groningen | Bellingwedde | | | N 367 – Blijham | |
| Groningen | Bellingwedde | | | N 969 – Blijham | |
| Groningen | Bellingwedde | | | N 973 – Wedde | |
| Groningen | Vlagtwedde | | | N 365 / N 376 – Vlagtwedde | |
1.000 mi = 1.609 km; 1.000 km = 0.621 mi
