= Veelerveen =

- Village
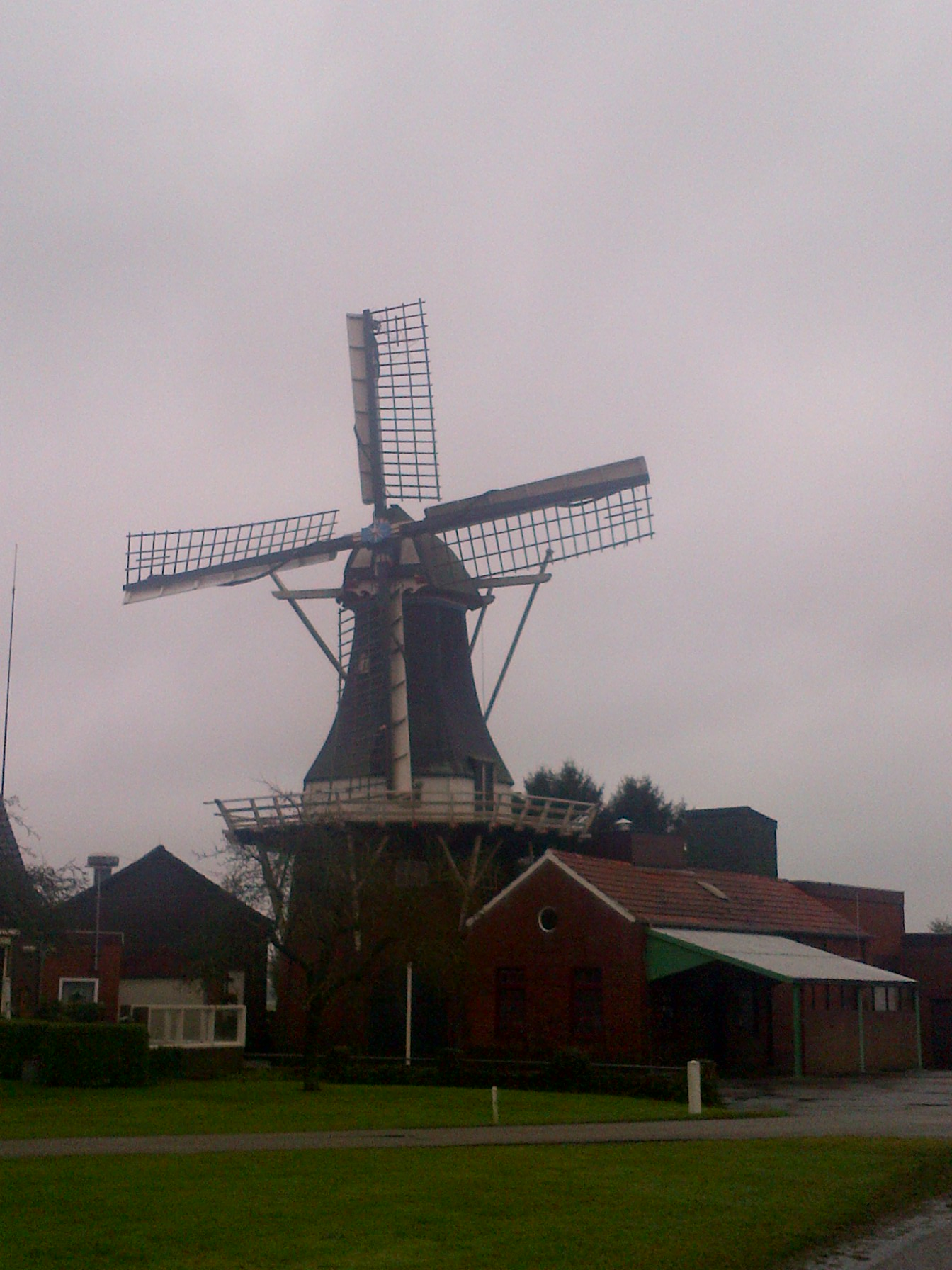
- Niemans Mill

- Location in the province of Groningen in the Netherlands Veelerveen (Netherlands)
- Coordinates: 53°3′20″N 7°7′40″E
- Country: Netherlands
- Province: Groningen
- Municipality: Westerwolde

Area (2012)
  - Total: 430 ha (1,100 acres)
  - Land: 423 ha (1,050 acres)
  - Water: 7 ha (17 acres)

Population (2017)
  - Total: 720
  - Density: 170/km^{2} (440/sq mi)
- Postcode: 9566
- Area code: 0597

Veelerveen (Dutch pronunciation: [ˌveːlərˈveːn]) is a linear village with a population of around 720 in the municipality of Westerwolde in the Netherlands.

== History ==
In 1968, Veelerveen became part of Bellingwedde. And in 2018, part of Westerwolde.

== Geography ==
Veelerveen is located in the centre of the municipality of Westerwolde in the east province of Groningen in the northeast of the Netherlands. It is situated in the region of Westerwolde.

In the northwest it is close to the village of Wedde, in the north to Vriescheloo, in the northeast to Bellingwolde, in the southeast to Bourtange, and in the southwest to Vlagtwedde.

The village is a linear settlement alongside the Ruiten-Aa-kanaal and B.L. Tijdenskanaal. The canals Mussel-Aa-kanaal, Ruiten-Aa-kanaal, and B.L. Tijdenskanaal come together at the village centre where the three-way bridge Noabers Badde connects the canal banks.

Veelerveen is an administrative neighbourhood (Dutch: buurt) and has a total area of 430 ha (1,100 acres) of which 423 ha (1,050 acres) is land and 7 ha (17 acres) is water.

== Demographics ==
In 2012, Veelerveen neighbourhood had a population of 590 and a population density of 140/km^{2} (360/sq mi).

== Attractions ==
Nieman's Mill (Gronings: Niemans Meuln) is a smock mill that was built in 1916. It has been listed as a national heritage site since 1972.

Map of Bellingwedde with Veelerveen in red

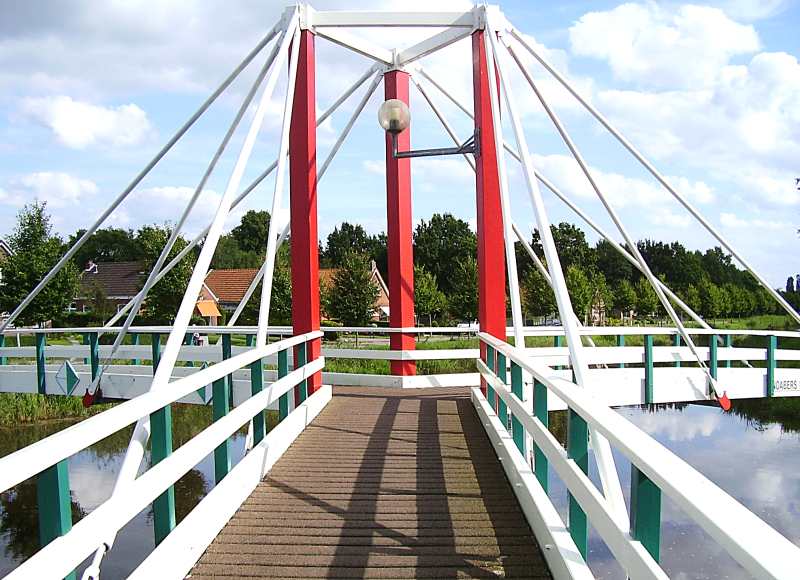
Mercedes Bridge

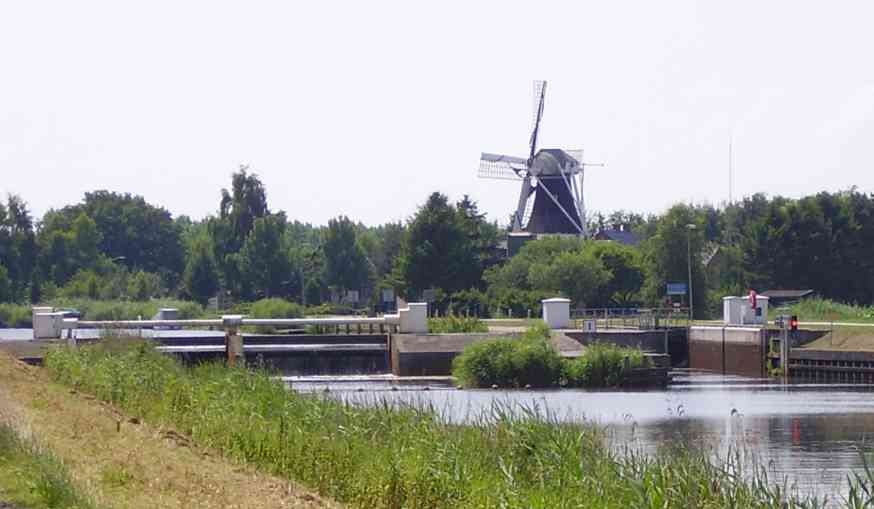
Sluice in the B.L. Tijdenskanaal with Nieman's Mill in the background in 2005
