= Provincial road N973 (Netherlands) =

Former provincial road in the Netherlands

Provincial highway 973
- Provinciale weg 973
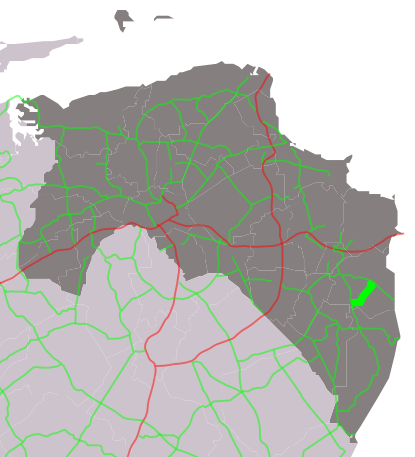

Route information
- Length: 6.7 km (4.2 mi)

Major junctions
- Southwest end: N368 in Wedde
- Northeast end: N969 in Bellingwolde

Location
- Country: Kingdom of the Netherlands
- Constituent country: Netherlands

Highway system
- Roads in the Netherlands; Motorways; E-roads; Provincial; City routes

The N973 is a provincial road in the municipality of Westerwolde in the province of Groningen in the Netherlands. It runs from Wedde to Bellingwolde.

== Route description ==
The provincial road N973 is 6.7 kilometres (4.2 mi) long. It starts in Wedde and runs northeast to Bellingwolde in the municipality of Westerwolde.

== Junction and exit list ==
Province	Municipality	km	mi	Destinations	Notes
Groningen	Bellingwedde			N 368 – Wedde	
Groningen	Bellingwedde			N 969 – Bellingwolde	
1.000 mi = 1.609 km; 1.000 km = 0.621 mi
