= Meis (disambiguation) =

Meis is a Spanish municipality in Pontevedra province.

Meis may refer to:

== People ==
- Dan Meis (born 1961), American architect
- Fré Meis (1921–1992), Dutch trade unionist and communist politician
- Sylvie Meis (born 1978), Dutch model and television personality

== Other ==
- Meis (department store), a department store in Indiana
- Kastellórizo, a Greek island also known as Meis
