= Spinnenkop Wedderveer =

Windmill in Wedde, Netherlands

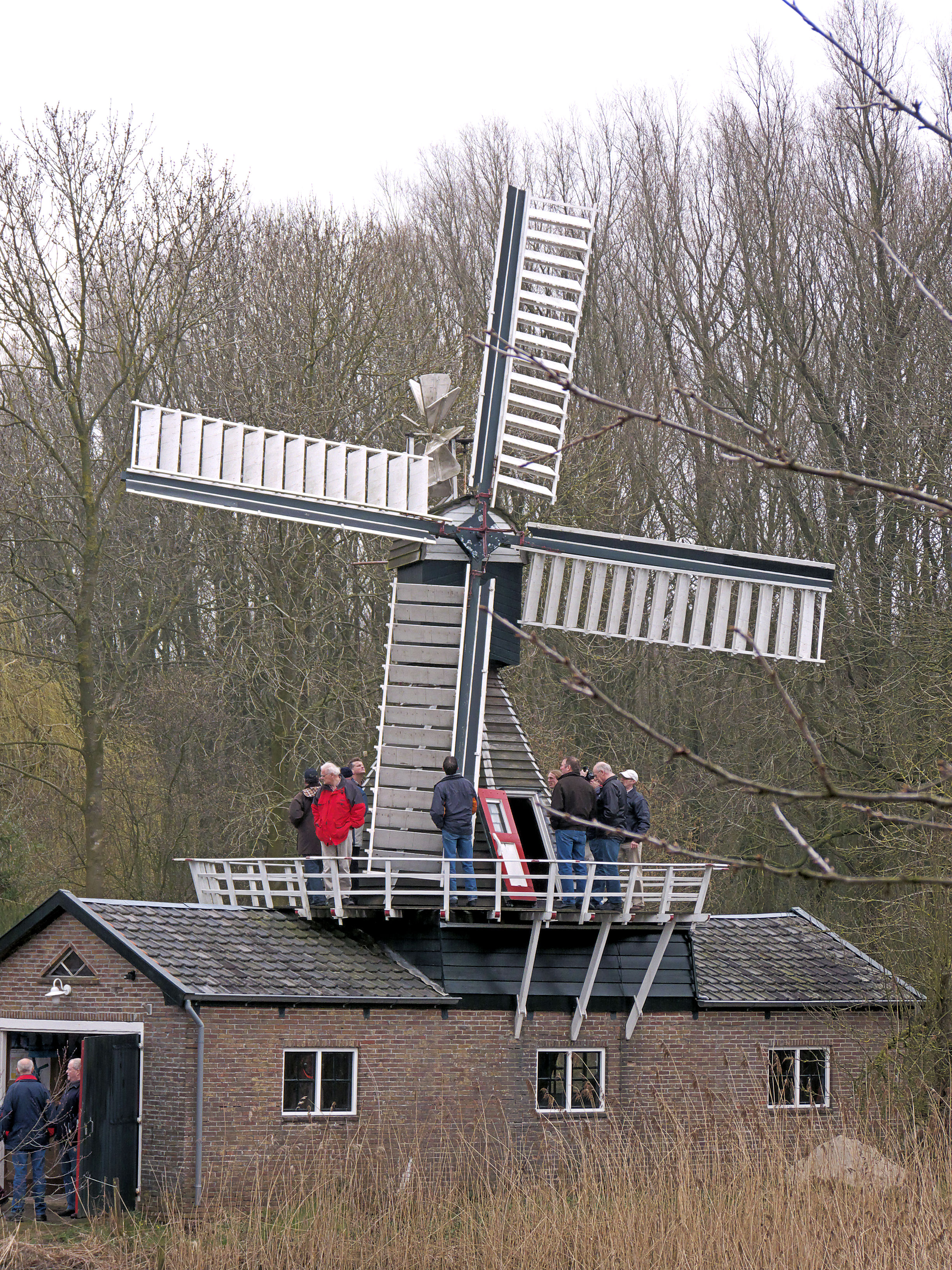
- Spinnenkop Wedderveer
- Interactive map of Spinnenkop Wedderveer

Origin
- Mill location: Near the road from Blijham to Wedde
- Coordinates: 53.084056°N 7.068366°E
- Operator: A. Dost
- Year built: 1934

Information
- Purpose: Sawmill
- Type: Hollow post
- Roundhouse storeys: Single storey roundhouse on a shed
- No. of sails: Four sails
- Type of sails: Patent sails
- Windshaft: Steel
- Winding: Fantail
- Other information: Bandsaw

Spinnenkop Wedderveer (Dutch pronunciation: [ˈspɪnə(ŋ)ˌkɔp ˌʋɛdərˈveːr]) is a wind powered sawmill in the village of Wedderveer, Groningen, Netherlands. It is a hollow post windmill of the type called "spinnenkop" by the Dutch built on top of a brick shed. The mill is listed as a Rijksmonument, number 388083 and is in working order.

== History ==
The mill was designed by architect Luitje Wiersema and built by the first owner and operator Eiko Jan Feunekes in 1938 to saw lumber from his oak plantation. After Feunekes death in 1940 ownership of the mill changed several times and by 1985 the mill was in such a bad state of repair that it was under threat of dismantlement. It was saved from this fate by obtaining monument status in 1990. The new owners A. Dost and O. Schaver managed to restore the mill in 1997 using government subsidies.

== Description ==
The mill of Wedderveen is what the Dutch describe as a "spinnenkop" (English: spiderhead mill). It is a small hollow post mill winded by a fantail. It is one of only two windmills in the Netherlands using this winding system, the other being De Sterrenberg. The Patent sails have a span of 10 metres (32 ft 10 in) and are carried on a steel windshaft. The brake wheel on the windshaft drives the wallower at the top of the upright shaft in the body (called head on a spinnenkop), which passed through the main post into the substructure. Here the crown wheel drives a shaft with pulleys and a flat belt. The mill is built on top of a brick storage shed. It formerly powered a horizontal saw located outside. Currently the mill poweres a bandsaw housed in the shed.

== Public access ==
The mill is open to the public on appointment.
