= List of mayors of Bellingwedde =

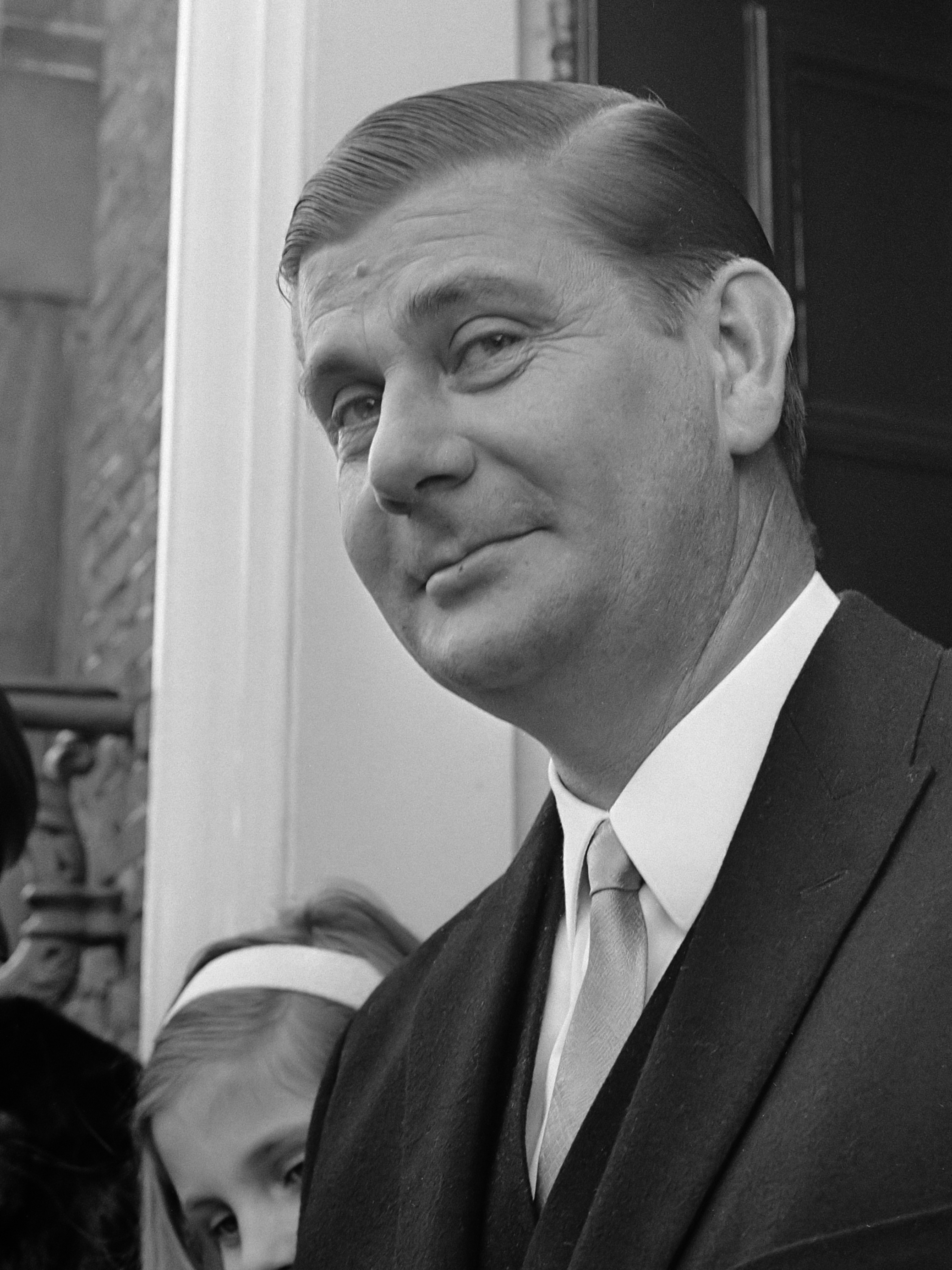
Henk Eijsink, first mayor of Bellingwedde, in 1970

Bellingwedde, Netherlands had six mayors between the establishment of the municipality on 1 September 1968 and its disestablishment on 1 January 2018.

#	Name	Political party	Start term	End term	Ref.
1	Henk Eijsink	Labour Party	1 September 1968	16 February 1970	
2	Jurjen Jan Hoeksema	Labour Party	16 June 1970	1 September 1978	
3	Engbert Drenth	Labour Party	16 April 1979	1 March 2007	
4	Chris Arlman	Labour Party	April 2007	1 November 2007	
5	Erik Triemstra	Christian Democratic Appeal	1 November 2007	1 November 2013	
6	Janneke Snijder-Hazelhoff	People's Party for Freedom and Democracy	14 November 2013	1 January 2018	
