= Blijham =

- Village
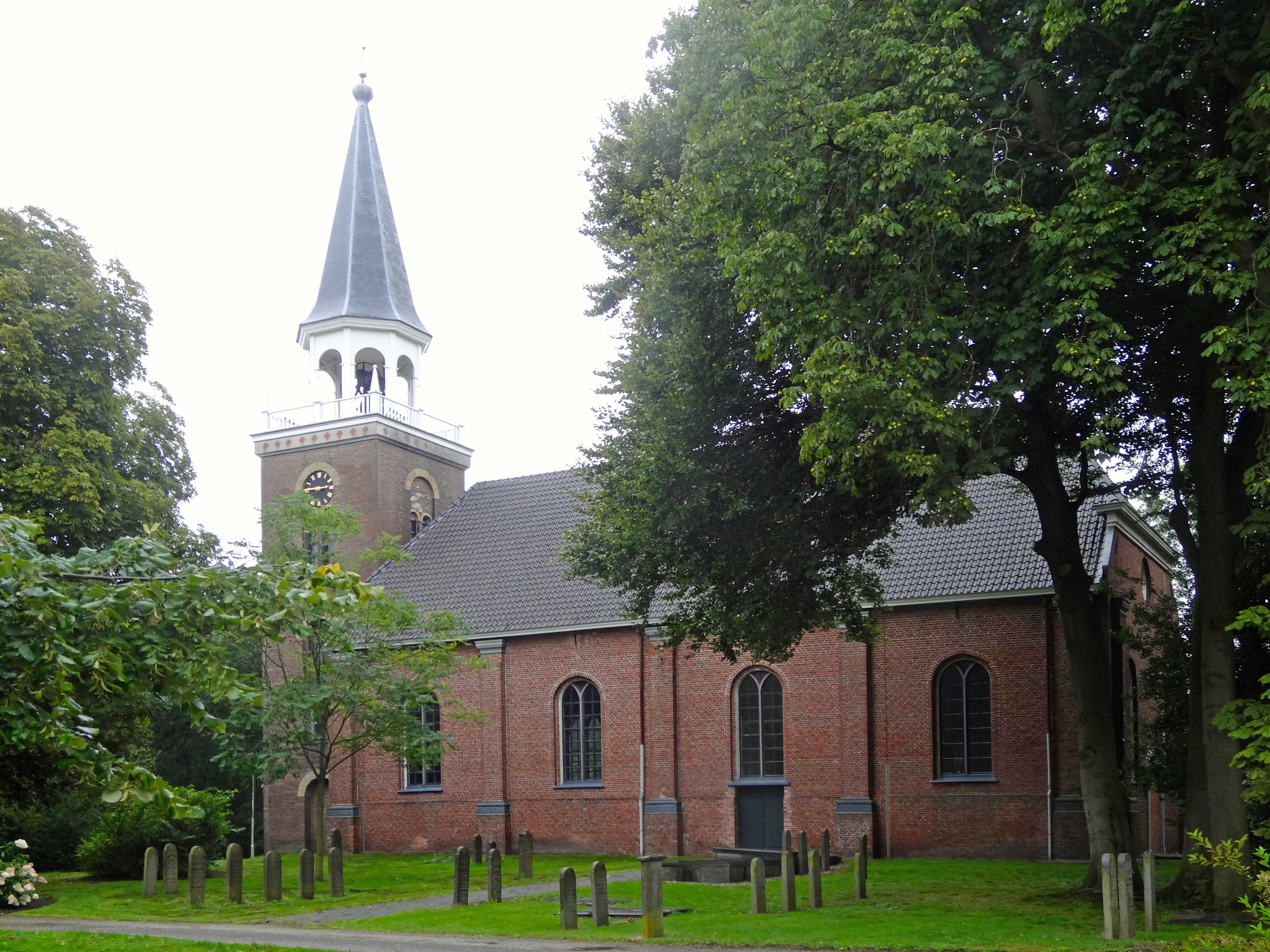
- Dutch Reformed Church of Blijham in 2015

- Location in the province of Groningen in the Netherlands Blijham (Netherlands)
- Coordinates: 53°6′35″N 7°4′35″E
- Country: Netherlands
- Province: Groningen
- Municipality: Westerwolde

Area (2012)
  - Total: 237 ha (590 acres)
  - Land: 235 ha (580 acres)
  - Water: 2 ha (4.9 acres)

Population (2017)
  - Total: 2,240
  - Density: 953/km^{2} (2,470/sq mi)
- Postal code: 9697
- Area code: 0597

Blijham (Dutch pronunciation: [blɛiˈɦɑm]) is a village with a population of 2,240 in the municipality of Westerwolde in the province of Groningen in the Netherlands. The origins of the settlement date back to the 11th century. Until 1968, Blijham was part of the municipality of Wedde. Until 2017, it was part of the municipality of Bellingwedde.

== Etymology ==
In the name Blijham, which is pronounced as [blɛiˈɦɑm], the part -ham means 'homestead'.

== History ==
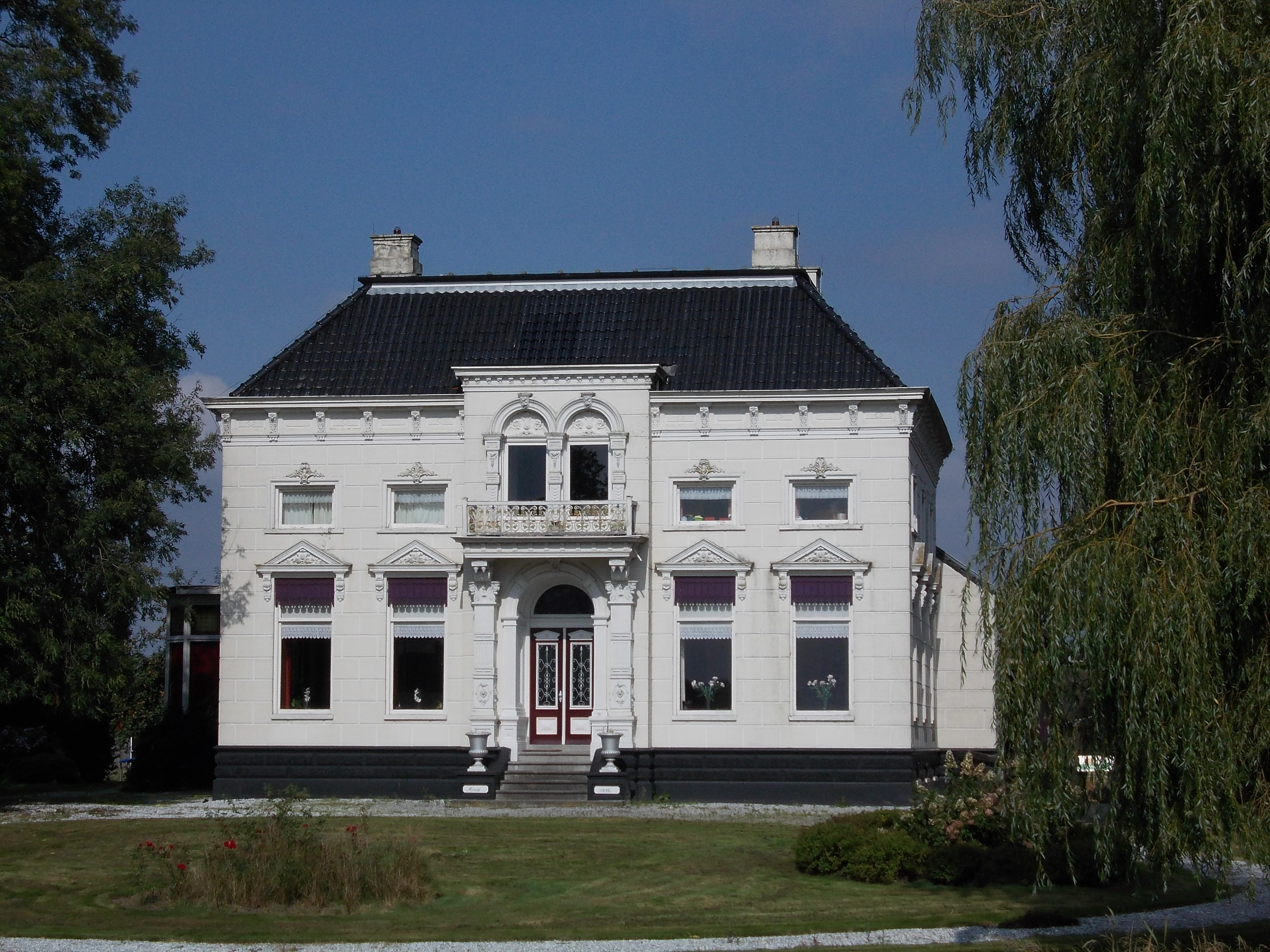
An Oldambt farmhouse in Blijham

The first settlement dates back to circa 1000 CE. It was built on top of a horseshoe-shaped sand ridge, on the road between the cities of Groningen and Münster. At the time, the water of the Dollart reached all the way down to the settlement.

The village of Blijham is formed out of the two population centres of Kerkhorn and Molenhorn, which are now completely connected.

Until 1968, Blijham was part of the municipality of Wedde. On 1 September 1968 the municipalities of Bellingwolde and Wedde were merged into the new municipality of Bellingwedde, of which Blijham then became a part. In 2018, Bellingwedde was merged with Vlagtwedde to form the new municipality of Westerwolde.

== Geography ==
Blijham is located at 53.1074°N 7.0765°E in the northwest of the municipality Westerwolde, in the east of the province of Groningen, in the northeast of the Netherlands. The village is situated between the rivers Pekel Aa and Westerwoldse Aa, and amid the village of Oude Pekela (to the west), the city of Winschoten (northwest), and the villages of Oudeschans (northeast), Bellingwolde (east), Vriescheloo (southeast), and Wedde (south).

Blijham is an administrative district (Dutch: wijk) and neighbourhood (Dutch: buurt). The district Blijham is one of three districts in the municipality of Bellingwedde, the other two being Bellingwolde and Oost. The district Blijham contains the neighbourhoods Blijham, Morige, Wedde, Wedderheide, Wedderveer, and some scattered houses.

== Demographics ==
As of 2017, Blijham has a population of 3,915 (source: CBS) and a population density of 207/km^{2} (540/sq mi).

== Transportation ==
The provincial roads N367, N368, and N969 are connecting Blijham to the nearby settlements. The N367 goes north to Winschoten and west to Oude Pekela and Nieuwe Pekela. The N368 goes south to Wedde and Vlagtwedde. The N969 goes east to Bellingwolde and the German border.

The nearest railway is the Harlingen–Nieuweschans railway north of Blijham, with its nearest station Winschoten.

== Education ==
There are two primary schools in the village, the public school De Wiekslag and the Christian school De Loopplank. The nearest secondary schools are in Bellingwolde, Oude Pekela, and Winschoten.

== Sport ==
The IJsbaan or Baansport doubles up as an ice skating venue in the winter and a motorsport circuit in the summer. It is located on the western edge of the village on the Verschedijk road, adjacent to the Kerklaan road. It was once a notable venue for motorcycle speedway and hosted important events, including final rounds of the Dutch Championship, as part of the Speedway World Championship (starting in 1987) a qualifying round of the Speedway World Team Cup in 2000 and a round of the Speedway World Pairs Championship in 1985.
