= Provincial road N969 (Netherlands) =

Road in the Netherlands

Provincial highway 969
- Provinciale weg 969
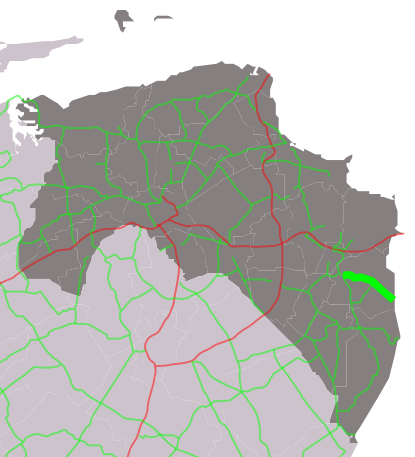

Route information
- Length: 10.7 km (6.6 mi)

Major junctions
- West end: N368 in Blijham
- N973 in Bellingwolde
- East end: German border

Location
- Country: Kingdom of the Netherlands
- Constituent country: Netherlands

Highway system
- Roads in the Netherlands; Motorways; E-roads; Provincial; City routes

The N969 is a provincial road in the province of Groningen in the Netherlands. It runs from Blijham through Bellingwolde and Rhederbrug, all in the municipality of Westerwolde, to the German border.

== Route description ==
The provincial road N969 is 10.7 kilometres (6.6 mi) long. It starts in Blijham in the municipality of Westerwolde. It then runs southeast via Bellingwolde and Rhederbrug in the same municipality, and ends at the German border.

== Junction and exit list ==
Province	Municipality	km	mi	Destinations	Notes
Groningen	Bellingwedde			N 368 – Blijham	
Groningen	Bellingwedde			N 973 – Bellingwolde	
Groningen	Bellingwedde			German border	Road towards Rhede
1.000 mi = 1.609 km; 1.000 km = 0.621 mi
