= Provincial road N367 (Netherlands) =

Highway in the Netherlands

Provincial highway 367
- Provinciale weg 367
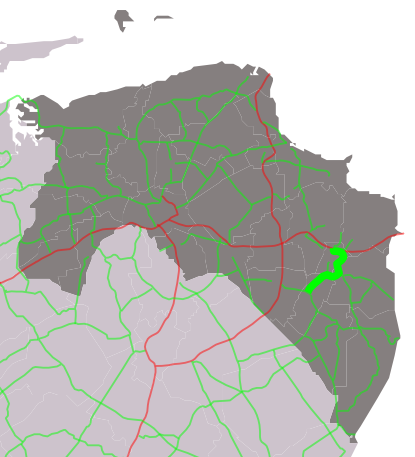

Route information
- Length: 13.3 km (8.3 mi)

Major junctions
- North end: A7 (E22) in Winschoten
- N368 in Blijham; N972 in Oude Pekela
- South end: N366 in Nieuwe Pekela

Location
- Country: Kingdom of the Netherlands
- Constituent country: Netherlands

Highway system
- Roads in the Netherlands; Motorways; E-roads; Provincial; City routes

The N367 is a provincial road in the province of Groningen in the Netherlands. It runs from Winschoten in the municipality of Oldambt to Nieuwe Pekela in the municipality of Pekela.

== Route description ==
The provincial road N367 is 13.3 kilometres (8.3 mi) long. It starts in Winschoten in the municipality of Oldambt. It then runs south via Blijham in the municipality of Westerwolde, goes through Oude Pekela, and ends in Nieuwe Pekela in the municipality of Pekela.

== Junction and exit list ==
Province	Municipality	km	mi	Destinations	Notes
Groningen	Oldambt			A 7 / E22 – Winschoten	
Groningen	Bellingwedde			N 368 – Blijham	
Groningen	Pekela			N 972 – Oude Pekela	
Groningen	Pekela			N 366 – Nieuwe Pekela	
1.000 mi = 1.609 km; 1.000 km = 0.621 mi
