= Den Ham, Bellingwedde =

Den Ham
- Hamlet
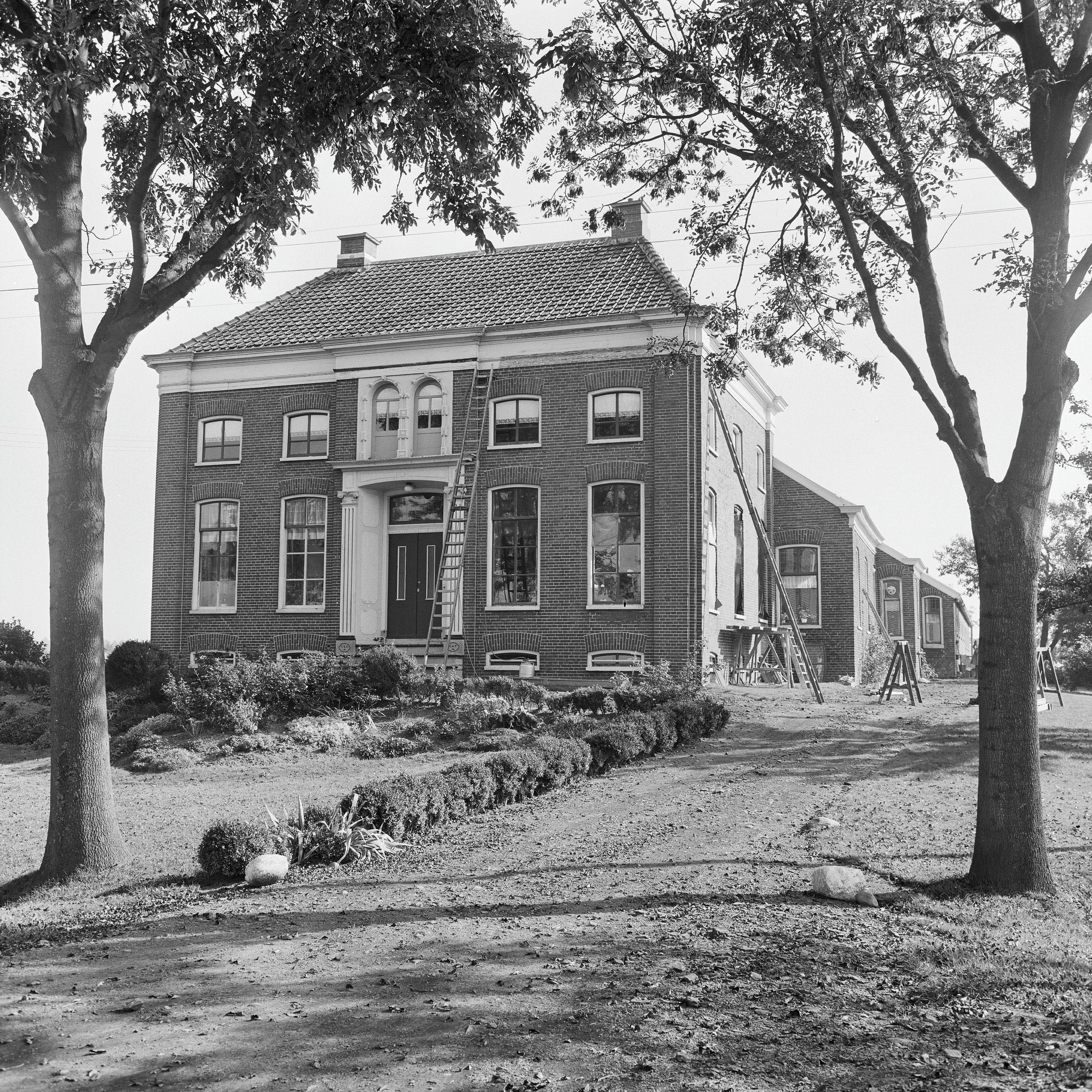
- Farm house in 1969

- Location of Den Ham in the province of Groningen
- Coordinates: 53.138°N 7.168°E
- Country: Netherlands
- Province: Groningen
- Municipality: Westerwolde

Den Ham (Dutch pronunciation: [dɛn ˈɦɑm]) is a hamlet in the Dutch province of Groningen. It is located in the municipality of Westerwolde, close to the border with Germany, between Bellingwolde and Nieuweschans.
