= Fré Meis =

Dutch communist politician

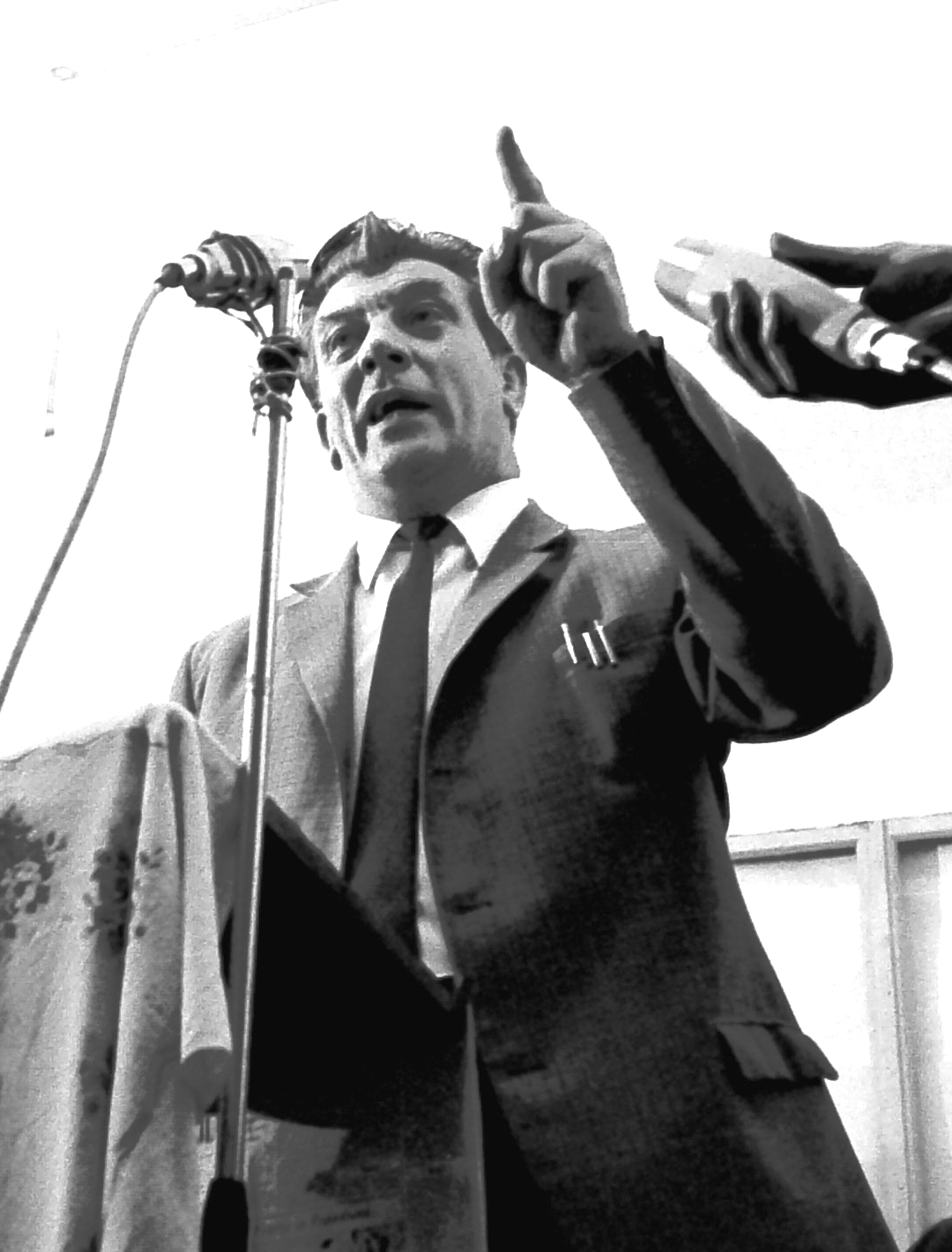
- Meis during a 1969 strike in Oude Pekela

House of Representatives
- In office 11 May 1971 – 8 June 1977

Provincial Council of Groningen
- In office 6 June 1962 – 1 November 1978

Municipal Council of the city of Groningen
- In office 22 June 1949 – 28 May 1958
- In office 31 October 1960 – 1 November 1978

Personal details
- Born: Frederik Meis; 17 November 1921 Oude Pekela, Groningen, Netherlands
- Died: 15 December 1992 (aged 71) Groningen, Groningen, Netherlands
- Party: Communist Party (1945–1990); GroenLinks (1990–1992)
- Occupation: trade unionist and politician

Frederik "Fré" Meis (17 November 1921 – 15 December 1992) was a Dutch communist politician and trade unionist. He served in the House of Representatives for the Communist Party from 1971 until 1977, the Municipal Council of the city of Groningen from 1949 until 1958 and 1960 until 1978, and in the Provincial Council of Groningen from 1962 until 1978. Meis received national attention as the leader of the 1969 strikes in Oude Pekela, and the 1970 strike in the Port of Rotterdam.

== Biography ==
Meis was born on 17 November 1921 in Oude Pekela, Netherlands in a communist family. After finishing elementary school, he worked on a farm and later for a brickworks. In 1943, during World War II, he became a forced labourer in Delfzijl, and later was ordered to build bunkers on the German island of Borkum.

After the liberation of the Netherlands, Meis joined the Communist Party of the Netherlands (CPN) and helped distribute De Waarheid, the party newspaper. In July 1946, he was a candidate for the Provincial Council of Groningen, but did not get elected. In the same month, he was a candidate in the municipal council of Winschoten, and was elected.

In 1948, Meis was fired, and had difficulty finding employment as a known communist. He moved to the city of Groningen. On 22 June 1949, he was elected to the municipal council of the Groningen and served until 28 May 1958. He was re-elected on 31 October 1960 and served until 1 November 1978. On 6 June 1962, he was elected to the Provincial Council of Groningen.

== Strike leader ==
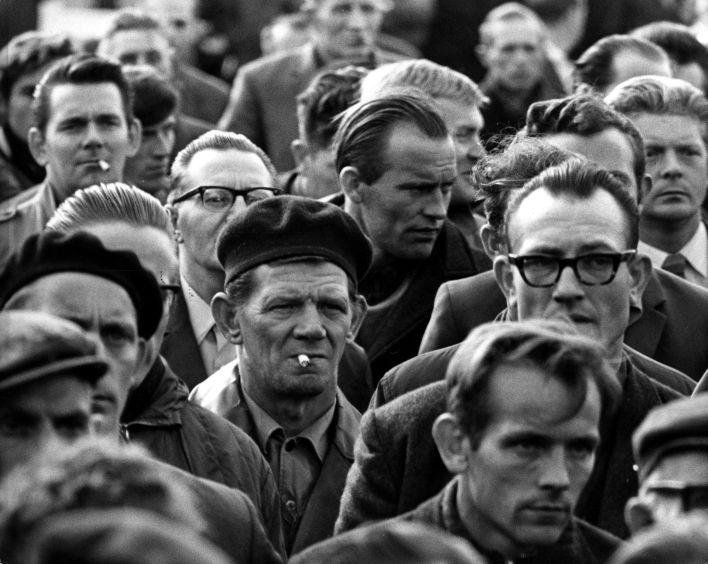
1969 strike in Oude Pekela

On 22 September 1969, the employees of the cardboard factory Union in Oude Pekela called a Monday wildcat strike and demanded the same wages as their colleagues in the west of the country. Meis went to Oude Pekela to organise the strike. The strike spread to more factories in the region, and from 27 October onwards, 23,000 employees were on strike each Monday. The press referred to the strikes as "Red Mondays".

On 15 December 1969, 30 women at cigar factory Champ Clark in Nieuwe Pekela called the first women's strike of the Netherlands for the same wages as their male colleagues. Champ Clark threatened to fire the women, however the women went to Meis who brought in the union. The strikes were successful. Regional differences in pay were no longer considered acceptable, and women and men were to receive equal pay.

At the 1970 Dutch provincial elections in Groningen the Communist Party scored an electoral victory with 14% of the votes. The newspapers called it the "Meis-effect". Meis was promoted to the executive committee of the CPN. In August 1970, a strike was called in the Port of Rotterdam. The CPN dispatched Meis to Rotterdam, who quickly became the leader of the strike, and ensured that all demands were met.

== Later life ==
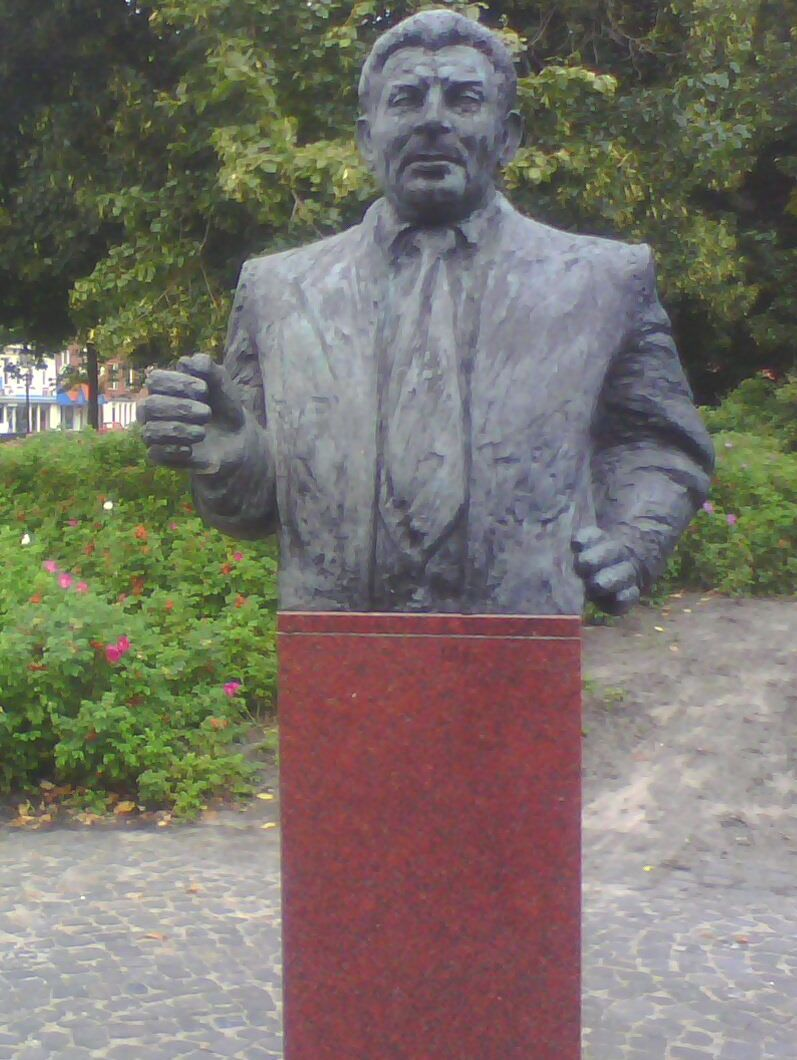
Monument of Meis in Oude Pekela

On 11 May 1971, Meis was elected to the House of Representatives, and served until 8 June 1977. On 1 November 1978, Meis retired from the municipal and provincial councils due to health problems. In 1987, he published his autobiography "40 jaar actie" (40 years action).

Meis remained a communist after the dissolution of the Soviet Union. In 1990, the CPN abandoned its Marxist–Leninist roots and merged with GroenLinks. Meis reluctantly joined the new party. In 1992, he resigned from GroenLinks after fellow party member Herman Verbeek had made a remark about the old-Stalinists. Meis had also been conducting weddings for the civil registry of Groningen since 1969. On the advice of his doctor, he retired, and conducted his last marriage on 14 December 1992.

Meis died on 15 December 1992 in Groningen, at the age of 71.

In 2002, a statue of Fré Meis by Christine Chiffrun was revealed in Oude Pekela.
