= Janneke Snijder-Hazelhoff =

Dutch politician

Personal details
- Born: Janna Fennechien Hazelhoff; 26 December 1952 (age 73) Nieuwe Pekela, Netherlands
- Party: People's Party for Freedom and Democracy (VVD)
- Spouse: Jan Snijder (m. 1973)
- Children: 2 daughters, 1 son

Janna Fennechien "Janneke" Snijder-Hazelhoff (born 26 December 1952) is a Dutch politician. As a member of the People's Party for Freedom and Democracy (Volkspartij voor Vrijheid en Democratie) she was an MP from 1999 to 2002 and from 3 June 2003 to 19 September 2012. She focused on matters of agriculture, food safety, biotechnology, infrastructure and natural environment. From 14 November 2013 to 1 January 2018 she was acting mayor of Bellingwedde, and acting mayor of Oldebroek from 9 July 2018 to 3 October 2019.

Snijder-Hazelhoff was a member of the municipal council of Termunten from 1982 to 1990 (on behalf of Termunten Gemeente Belangen from 1986 to 1990), a member of the municipal council of Delfzijl from 1990 to 2000 as well as an alderwoman of this municipality from 1998 to 2000. She was also a member of the States-Provincial of Groningen from 1992 to 1999.
