= Wedderveer =

- Hamlet
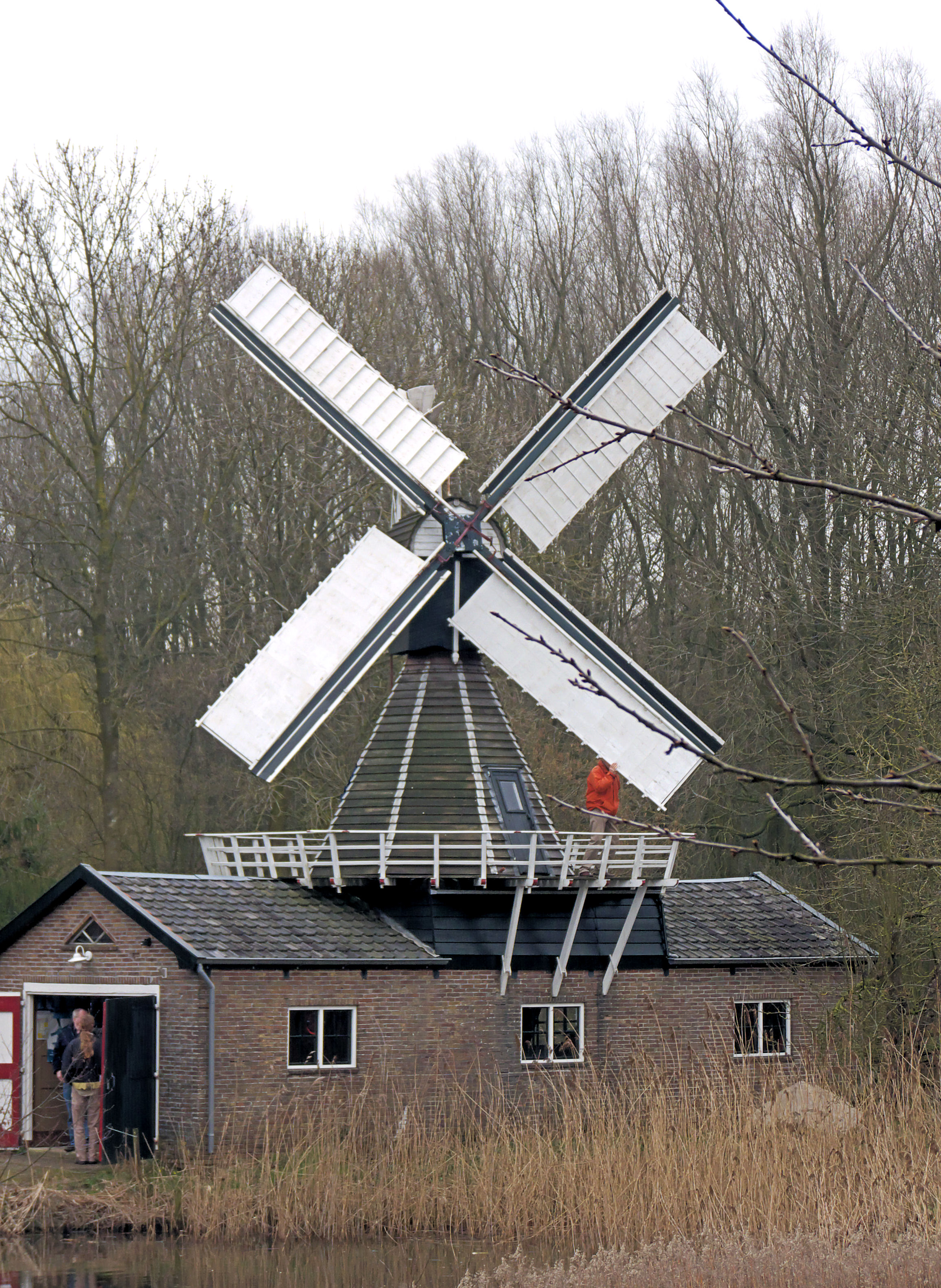
- Windmill Spinnenkop Wedderveer in 2010

- Location of Wedderveer in the province of Groningen Wedderveer (Netherlands)
- Coordinates: 53°5′N 7°4′E
- Country: Netherlands
- Province: Groningen
- Municipality: Westerwolde
- Village: Wedde

Area (2012)
  - Total: 47 ha (120 acres)
  - Land: 44 ha (110 acres)
  - Water: 3 ha (7.4 acres)

Population (2017)
  - Total: 135
  - Density: 310/km^{2} (790/sq mi)
- Area code: 0597

Wedderveer (Dutch pronunciation: [ˌʋɛdərˈveːr]) is a hamlet near Wedde in the municipality of Westerwolde in the Netherlands. It has a population of around 135 and a total area of 47 ha (120 acres).

The sawmill Spinnenkop has been listed as a national heritage site since 1990.
