= Wedderborg =

Historical building in Wedde, Netherlands

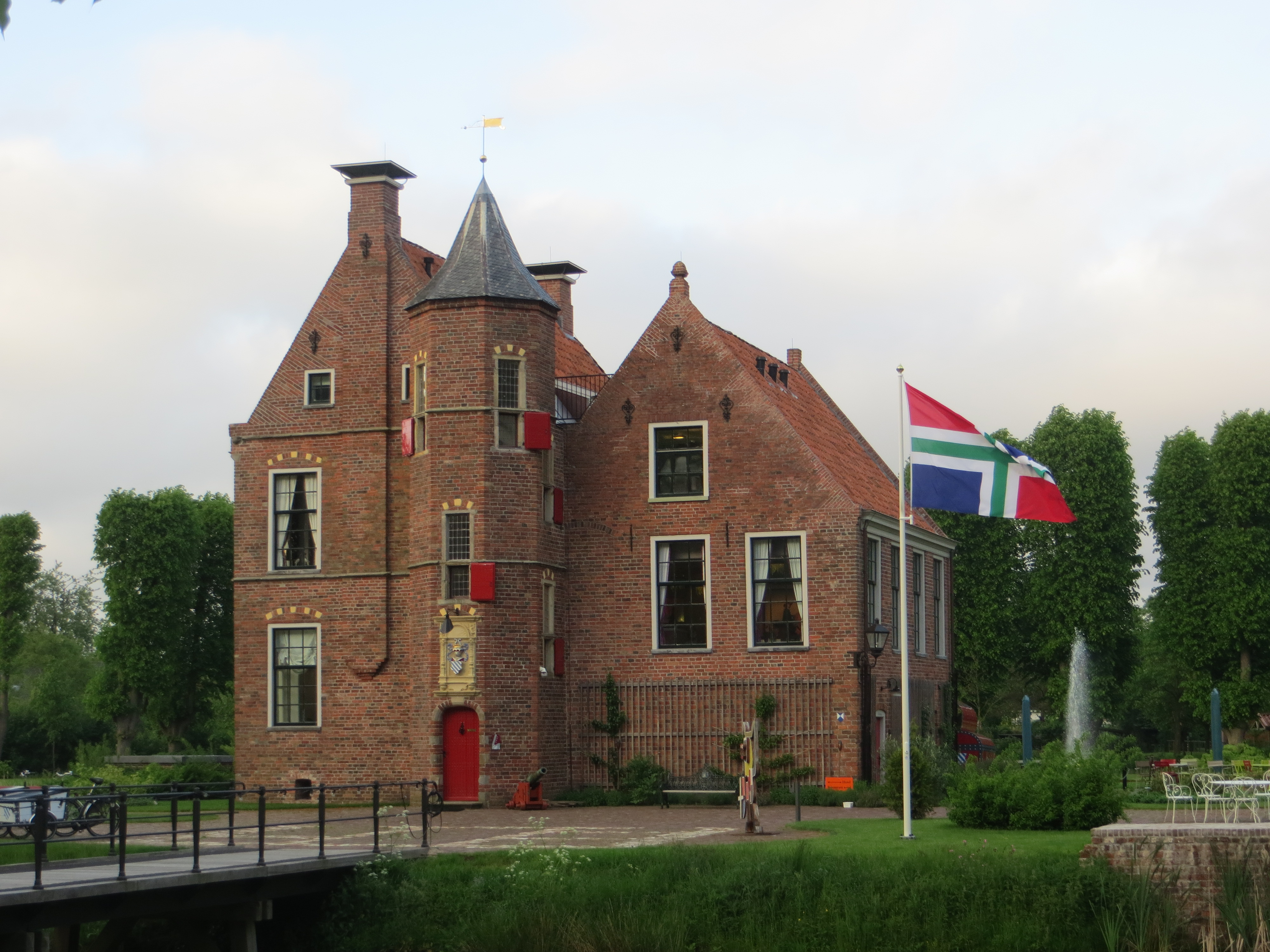
- Wedderborg in 2013

- Location within Groningen (province)
- Alternative names: Addingaborg; Burcht Wedde; Huis te Wedde

General information
- Type: Borg
- Location: Hoofdweg 7 Wedde, Netherlands
- Coordinates: 53°4′2″N 7°4′21″E

The Wedderborg (Dutch pronunciation: [ˌʋɛdərˈbɔr(ə)x]; Borough of Wedde) is a borg, a type of castle in Groningen, in the village of Wedde in the Netherlands. The building has 14th, 15th, and 16th-century elements and is currently used as a hotel and restaurant.

Wedderborg was built around 1370 by Egge Addinga who ruled the heerlijkheid Westerwolde on behalf of the bishop of Münster. The rule of the Addinga family was controversial. In 1478, the borg was destroyed by Groningen. It changed hands many times until 1594 when it became part of the Dutch Republic. Wedderborg remained the seat of the court of Westerwolde until 1818. In 1828, the borg became privately owned.

== Location ==
The Wedderborg is located at the Hoofdweg in the village Wedde in the municipality of Westerwolde in the east of the province Groningen near the Dutch–German border. It is situated on the bank of the river Westerwoldse Aa in the north of the region Westerwolde.

== History ==
Most of Westerwolde was a raised bog with few inhabitants, however it formed a natural border between Groningen, East Frisia and the Prince-Bishopric of Münster, and therefore changed ownership many times during its history. Wedde was located on the road between Groningen and Germany. In 1316, Westerwolde became part of Münster.

The Addinga family were East Frisian nobility who owned land near the Dollart. Their land was lost in a flood. In 1362, Egge I Addinga was given the heerlijkheid Westerwolde by the bishop of Münster, and started constructing Wedderborg around 1370.

=== Addinga family ===
The Addingas and the inhabitants of Westerwolde did not get along. Egge I started to appoint judges to enforce his rule. In 1391, he was killed by angry citizens. Egge II moved the court from Vlagtwedde to Wedderborg, and started a reign of terror. The citizens accused Egge II of extortion, plunder and taking of young virgins. In 1475, Egge II was killed. The bishop started an investigation, and released Ayke Ellersinck, one of the suspects, on bail. The same evening Ellersinck was killed by Haye II, the son of Egge II. Haye II had already killed a man in his youth, and was sentenced to pay a fine which he never did.

Later in 1475, the recently appointed priest of Onstwedde intended to inform the Pope of the rule of the Addingas. The priest and his replacement were brutally murdered by Haye II, their house was ransacked, and bodies dumped in the river. Even though the priest was missing an arm, it was labelled a suicide by Haye II. The city of Groningen ceased all possessions in Groningen of Haye II, because he had never paid the fine of his first murder. Haye II retaliated by destroying all possessions of Groningen in Westerwolde. In 1478, Wedderborg was attacked and destroyed by Groningen, and Haye II had to flee.

=== Dutch Revolt and Republic ===
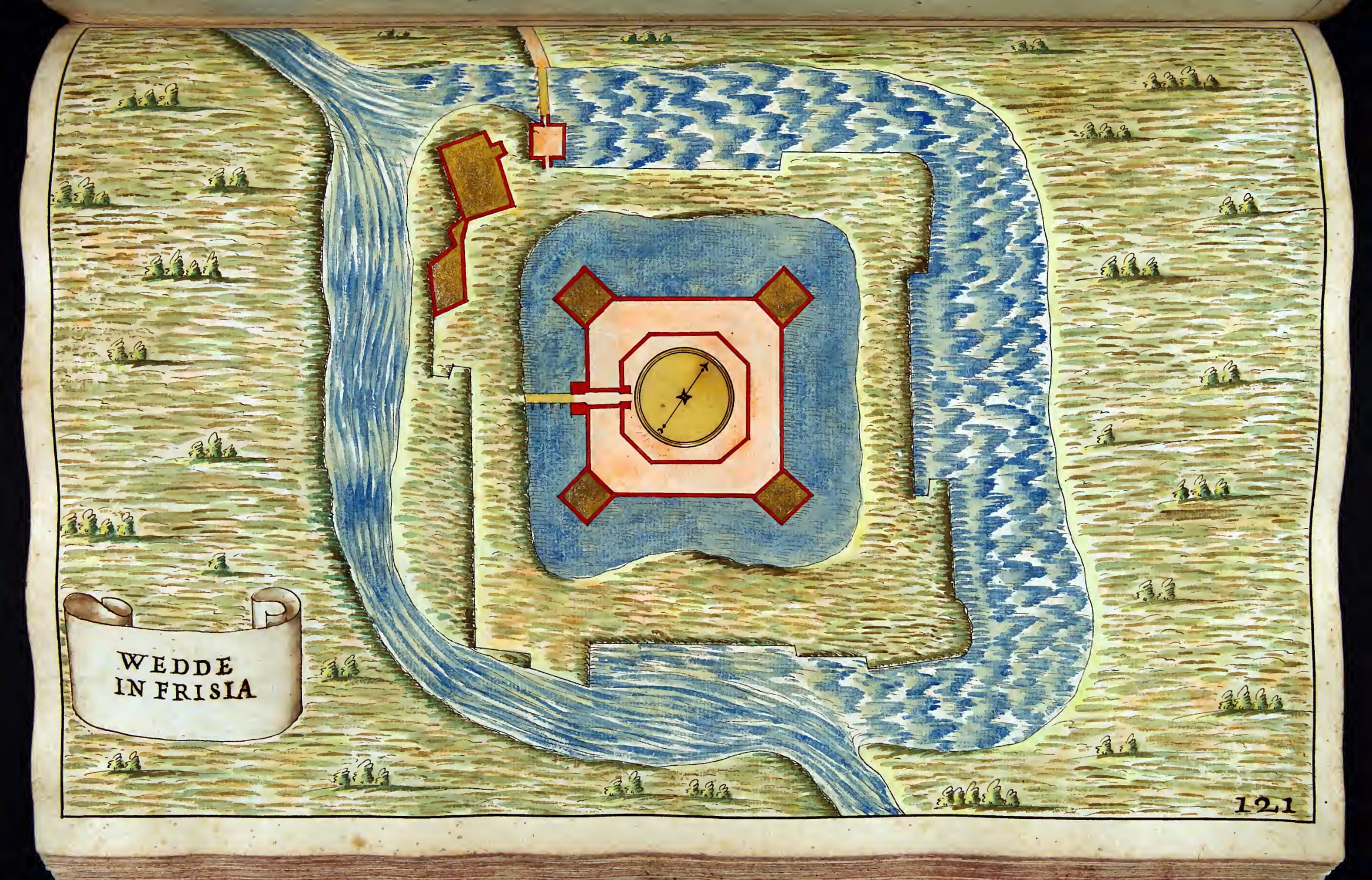
Map of Wedderborg before 1602. Probably during the Charles II period

In 1486, Haye II was allowed to return and rebuilt Wedderborg, however Groningen and Münster decided that the family had lost their privileges, and that the building could not be fortified and strengthened. In 1530, Wedderborg was captured by Charles II of Guelders. In 1536, it was conquered by Charles V, and Westerwolde became part of the Holy Roman Empire. During the Dutch Revolt, it changed hands between the Dutch Republic and Spain multiple times, until 1594, when it became part of the Generality Lands of the Dutch Republic.

Wedderborg remained the court for Westerwolde. Between 1587 and 1597, witch trials were held at Wedderborg, and 21 women and 1 man were burned at the stake at Geselberg. In 1597, witch trials were outlawed in the Dutch Republic, and Geselberg was only used for hangings and flagellation. In 1619, Westerwolde was bought by Groningen. In 1665 and 1672, Wedderborg was briefly conquered by Münster.

In 1818, the court was moved to Winschoten, and Groningen intended to demolish the borg. In 1828, the building was bought by notary Arnold Hendrik Koning, and remained in possession of his descendants until 1955.

The borg is currently used as a hotel and restaurant.

== Building ==
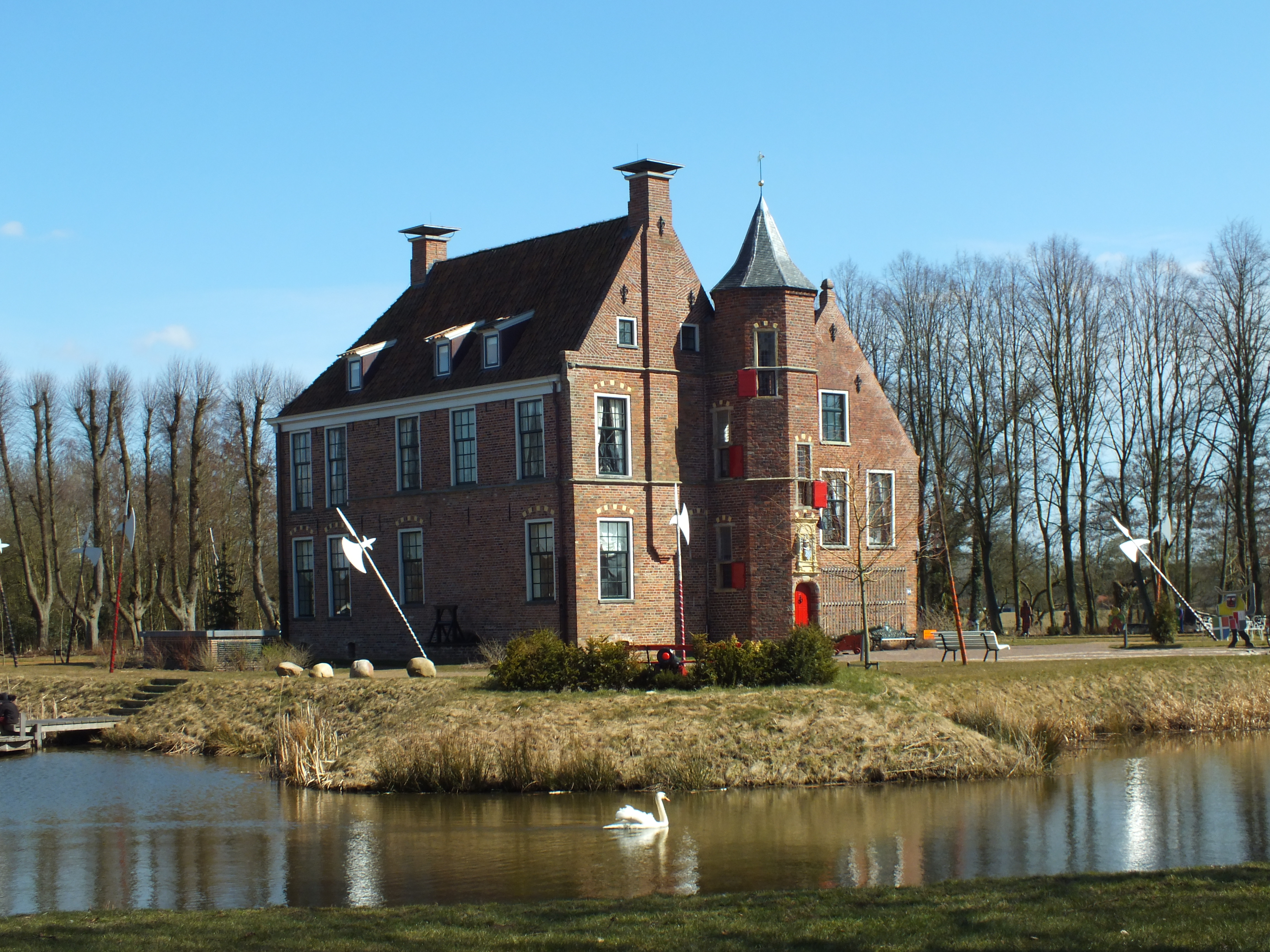
Wedderborg (2013)

The building is surrounded by a moat and consists of a 14th-century cellar, a 15th-century wing, and a 16th-century wing and tower. The Wedderborg became a rijksmonument (state monument) in 1972.

The current borg is significantly smaller than its medieval predecessor. The last corner tower was demolished in the middle of the 17th century, and the Koning family demolished the prison tower and the treasury house. The building was extensively renovated since 1955. In 1994, a new moat was dug around the borg.
