= Rhede, Lower Saxony =

Rhede
- Municipality
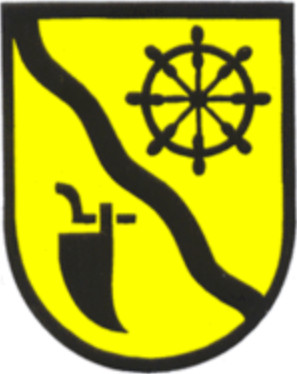
- Flag Coat of arms

- Location of Rhede within Emsland district
- Interactive map of Rhede
- Location within Germany Location within Lower Saxony
- Coordinates: 53°3′41″N 7°16′26″E
- Country: Germany
- State: Lower Saxony
- District: Emsland
- Subdivisions: 4 districts

Government
  - Mayor (2019–24): Jens Willerding (CDU)

Area
  - Total: 75.02 km^{2} (28.97 sq mi)
- Elevation: 5 m (16 ft)

Population (2025-12-31)
  - Total: 4,501
  - Density: 60.00/km^{2} (155.4/sq mi)
- Time zone: UTC+01:00 (CET)
  - Summer (DST): UTC+02:00 (CEST)
- Postal codes: 26899
- Dialling codes: 04964
- Vehicle registration: EL
- Website: www.rhede-ems.de

Rhede (German: [ˈʁeːdə]) is a municipality in the Emsland district, Lower Saxony, Germany. It is situated on the river Ems, near the border with the Netherlands, approx. 10 km west of Papenburg, and 20 km southeast of Winschoten.
