= Oude Pekela =

- Town
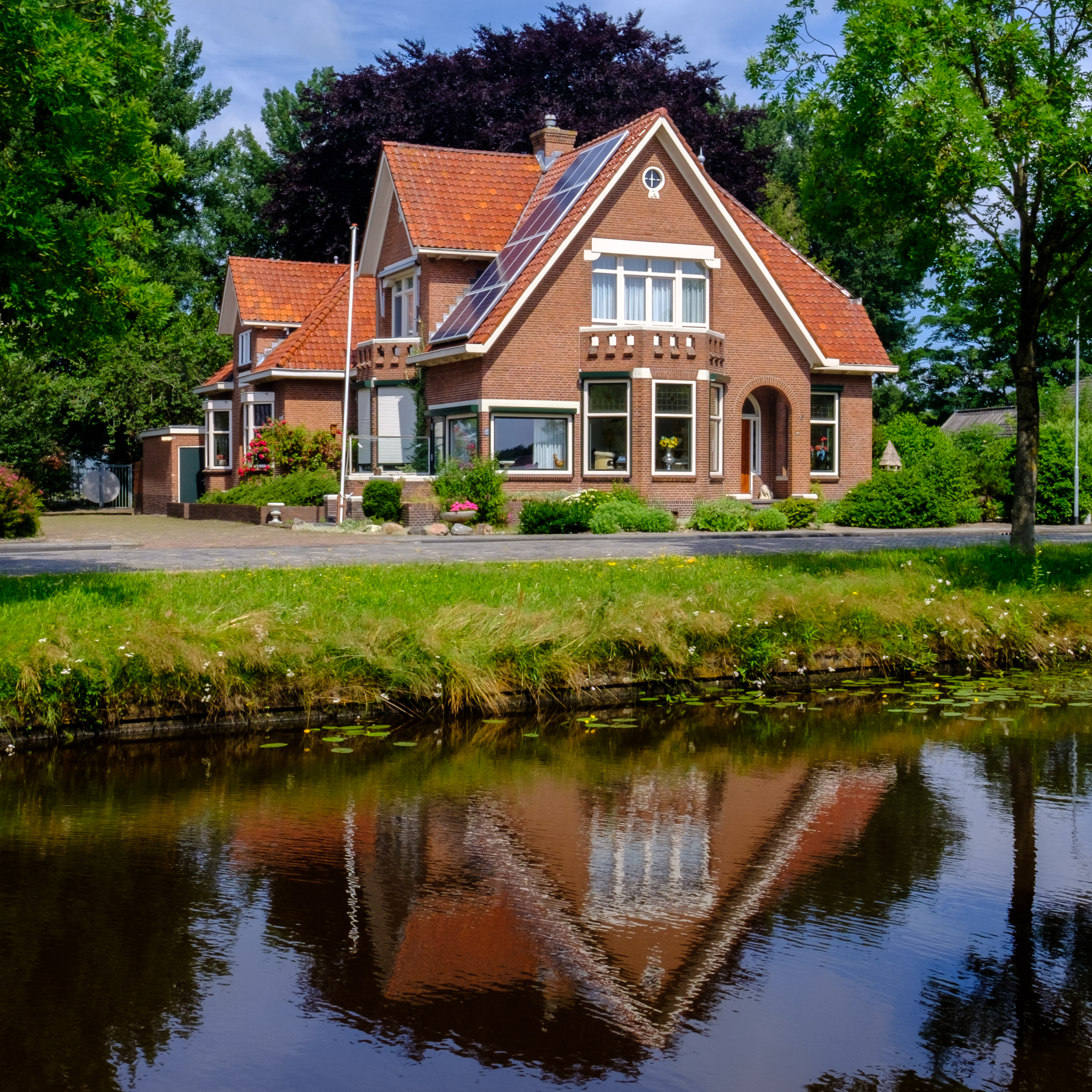
- Director's house (2021)

- Location of Oude Pekela in the province of Groningen Oude Pekela (Netherlands)
- Coordinates: 53°6′9″N 7°0′24″E
- Country: Netherlands
- Province: Groningen
- Municipality: Pekela
- Established: 1599

Area
  - Total: 9.82 km^{2} (3.79 sq mi)
- Elevation: 1 m (3.3 ft)

Population (2021)
  - Total: 7,485
  - Density: 762/km^{2} (1,970/sq mi)
- Demonym: Pekelaar
- Time zone: UTC+1 (CET)
  - Summer (DST): UTC+2 (CEST)
- Postal code: 9665
- Area code: 0597

Oude Pekela (Gronings: Olle Pekel; Dutch pronunciation: [ˈʌudə ˈpeːkəlaː]) is a town in the Dutch province of Groningen. It is located in the municipality of Pekela, about 5 km (3 miles) southwest of Winschoten. It was established to exploit the peat in the area. During the 19th century, it was known for its maritime transport. During the 20th century, Oude Pekela became the centre of the cardboard and potato starch industry.

== History ==
=== Peat colony ===
In the 1590s, the Friesche Compagnie (Frisian Company) was founded to exploit the peat in the area. In 1599, the land around the River Pekel A was bought and subdivided in 101 lots. Oude Pekela was established to house the workers. The town is named after the Pekel A, and is a linear settlement along the river which has been canalised and renamed Pekelderdiep. In 1635, it became part of the Groninger Peat Colonies, and was controlled by the city of Groningen as a colony. In 1704, the settlement was split into Oude Pekela (Old) and Nieuwe Pekela (New), because a second church was built.

In 1801, all towns and villages had to be governed by a municipality, and the peat colony came to an end. It was originally a municipality with neighbouring Nieuwe Pekela. In 1808, Oude Pekela was home to 3,371 people. In 1810, after Napoleon annexed the Batavian Republic, Oude Pekela became a separate commune and a mayor was appointed the next year. Oude Pekela remained a separate municipality until 1990, when it merged with Nieuwe Pekela.

=== Maritime transport ===
The River Pekel A connected Oude Pekela with the Dollart and the Wadden Sea. In 1717, the first lock was constructed in the town. Around 1800, the peat became exhausted, and the skippers started to make longer journeys. First to Holland, and later to England, the Baltic and the Mediterranean. Boat builders set up shop in the village, and the maritime industry flourished. In 1863, 60 wharfs and 160 ships were registered in Oude Pekela. The increasing popularity of the steamship resulted in a gradual decline. By 1892, there were only seven wharfs left. The former residential home of Captain Boon in Nieuwe Pekela has been turned into the Museum Kapiteinshuis Pekela and provides an overview of the maritime history of the region.

=== Industry ===
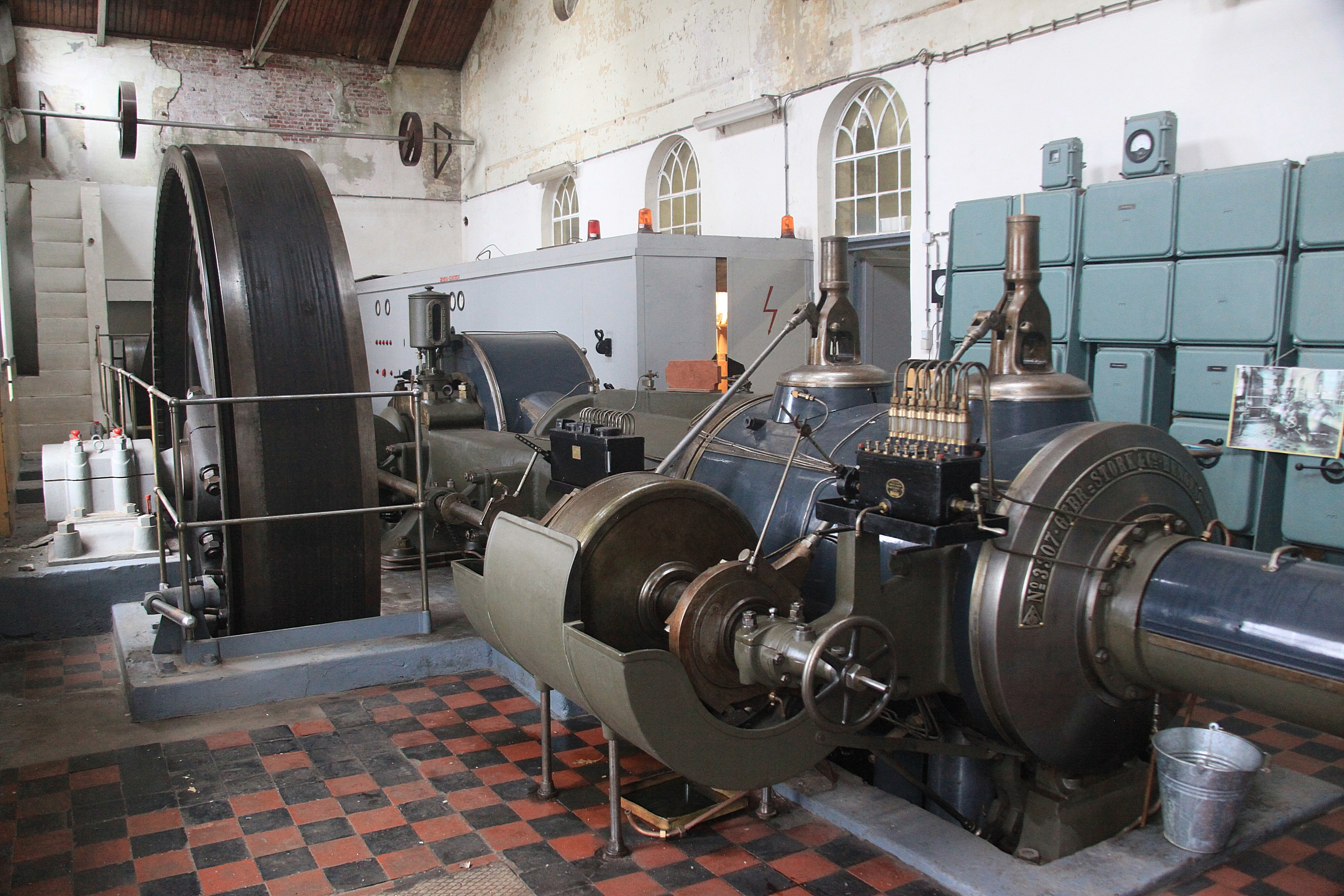
Steam engine of a cardboard factory

Oude Pekela developed into the centre of the cardboard and potato starch industry, The canal became known for its extreme pollution and stench. Water treatment plants were built, and the canal gradually became cleaner.

The working conditions in the factories were also unsatisfactory. In 1969, strikes were organised by Fré Meis of the Communist Party (CPN). The CPN scored an electoral victory in the 1970 Dutch provincial elections in Groningen with 14% of the votes, and Meis was promoted to the Executive Committee of the CPN.

=== Jewish community ===
In 1685, the first Jews settled in Oude Pekela, and were joined by immigrants from East Frisia and Poland in the late 18th century. Around 1700, the first Jewish cemetery was established, and the first synagogue was built in 1791. In 1884, a larger synagogue was constructed. In 1942, there were 150 Jews in Oude Pekela. Only 12 survived World War II. The synagogue was bought by the municipality in 1976, and was used by the boy scouts, but was demolished in 1979.

=== Recent history ===
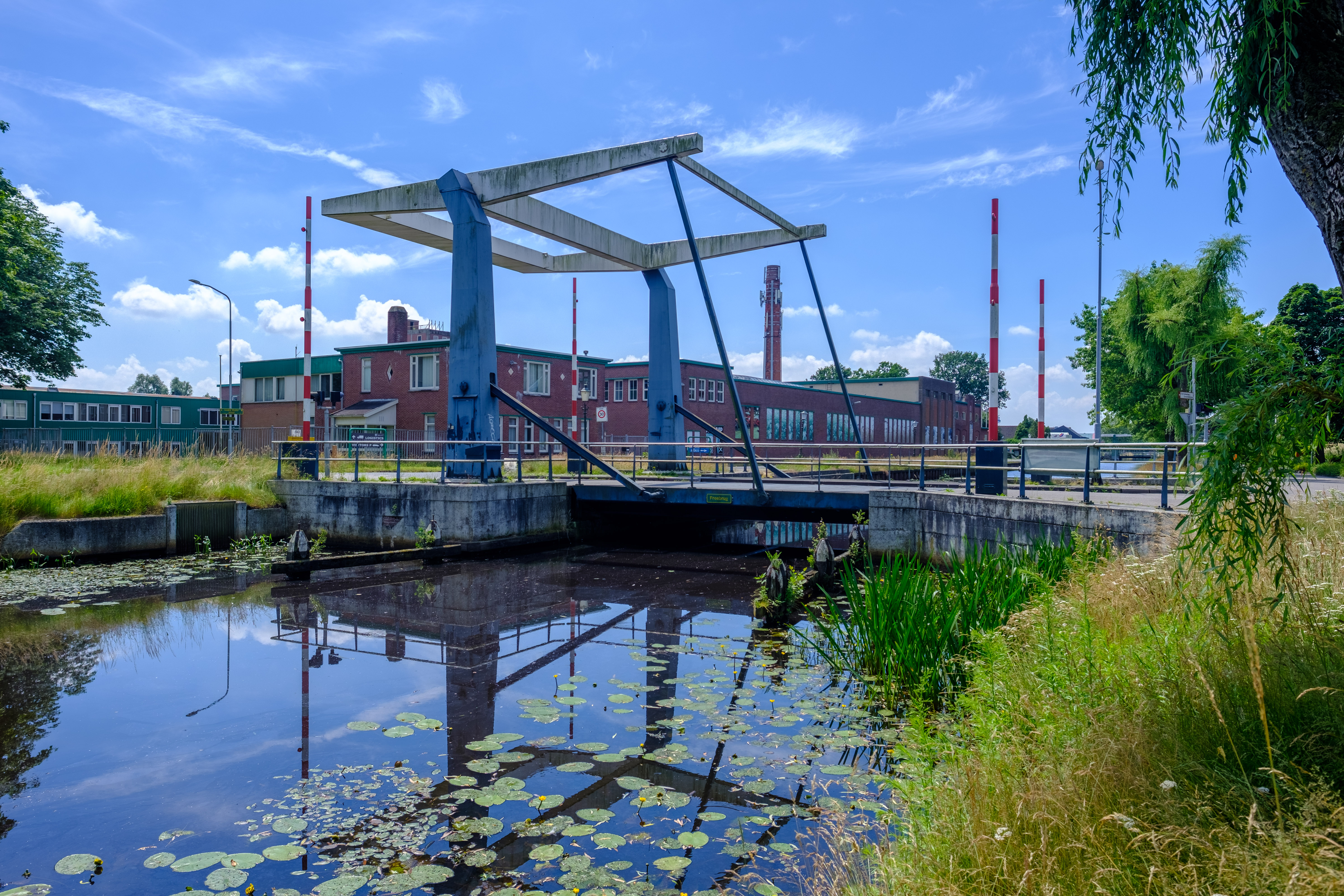
Freebrug (2021)

In the late 20th century, most of the factories in Oude Pekela closed down. HempFlax, a hemp factory, is still located in the town. In June 1987, Oude Pekela was in the news, because of allegations of sexual abuse of numerous children by a clown. The case received massive media attention, and caused large demonstrations. A police spokesperson used the words "mass hysteria" which further inflamed the situation. After a massive investigation, the case was closed on 17 October 1988 due to lack of evidence.

Oude Pekela is still one of the poorest places with high unemployment. In 2009 and 2010, Elsevier Weekblad considered it the worst place of the Netherlands, however the inhabitants thoroughly disagreed. The town serves as a regional shopping centre. In 2017, the renovation of the centre started. The municipality managed to entice shops to return to the centre, and the renovation was completed in December 2021. In 2021, it had the most affordable real estate of the country.

== Transport ==
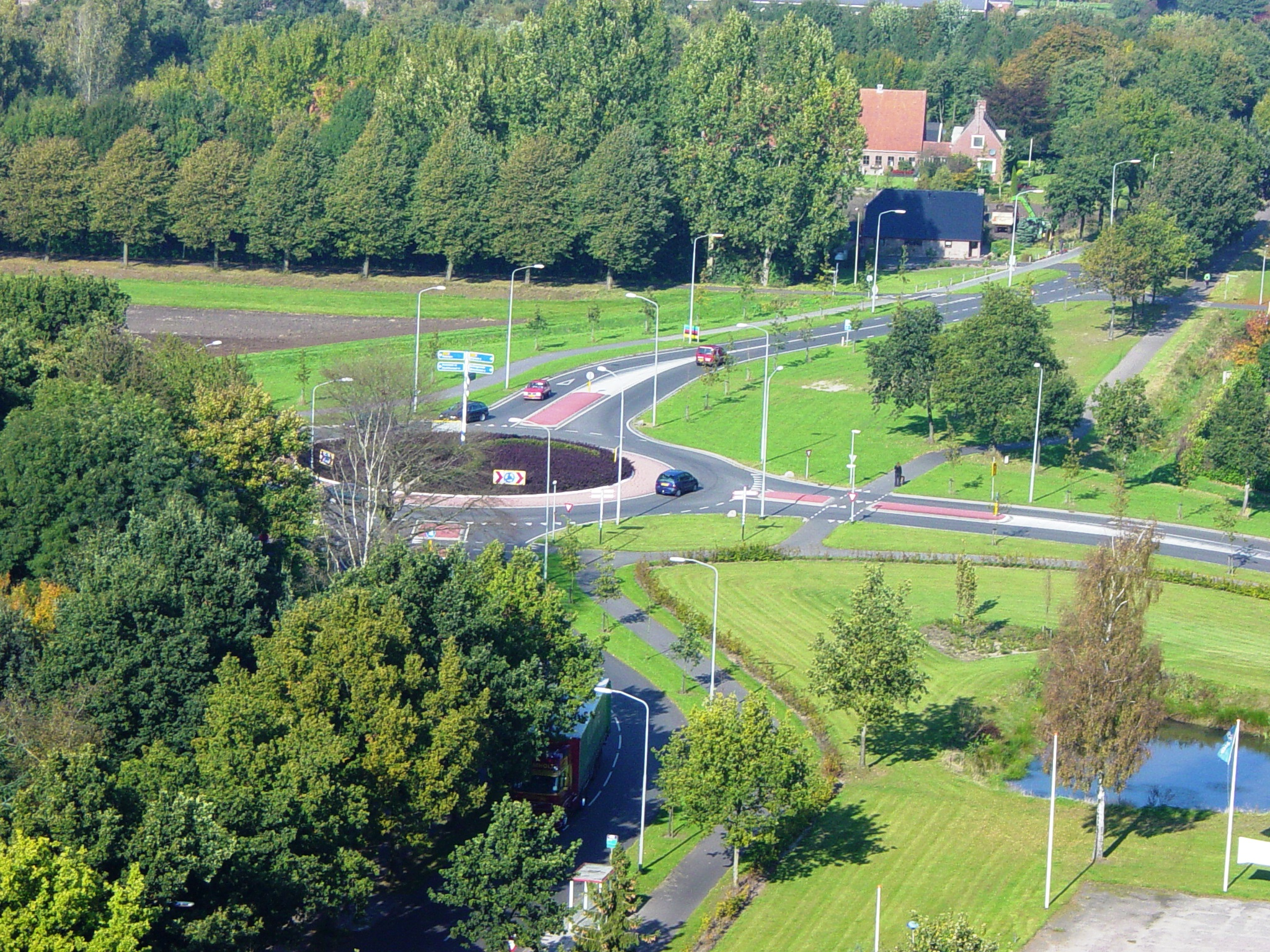
Roundabout on the N367

Between 1885 and 1939, Oude Pekela was served by the steam tram from Winschoten to Stadskanaal. Oude Pekela can be reached by car via the N367 which connects to the A7 motorway.

== Sport ==
Oude Pekela hosted the finish of stage 4b at the 2012 Energiewacht Tour, and the start of stage 2 at the 2013 Energiewacht Tour.

== Notable people ==
- Fré Meis (1921–1992), communist politician
- Gerard Wiekens (born 1973), former footballer

== Gallery ==
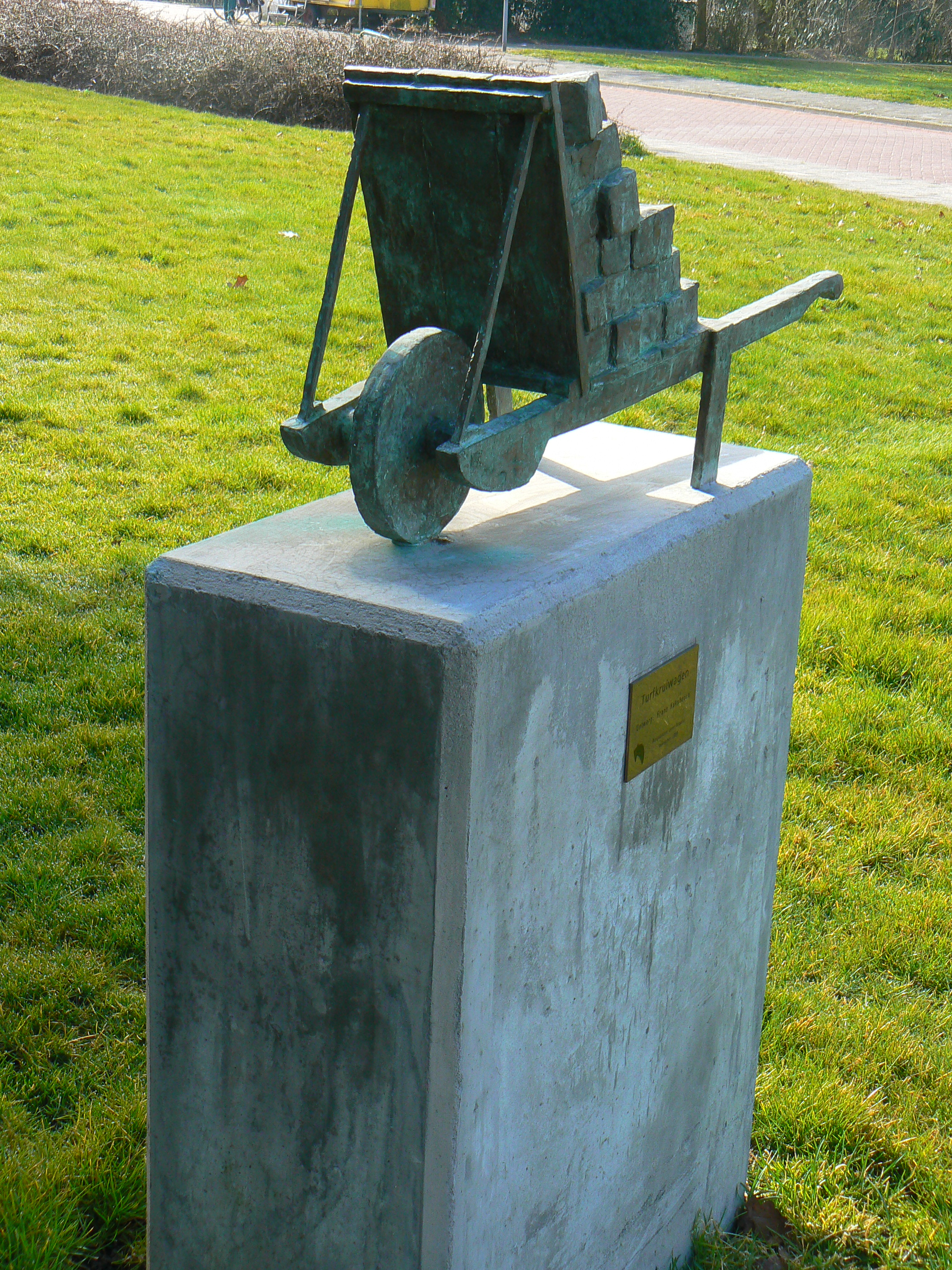
Sculpture "Turfkruiwagen" (2009) by Frans Kokshoorn

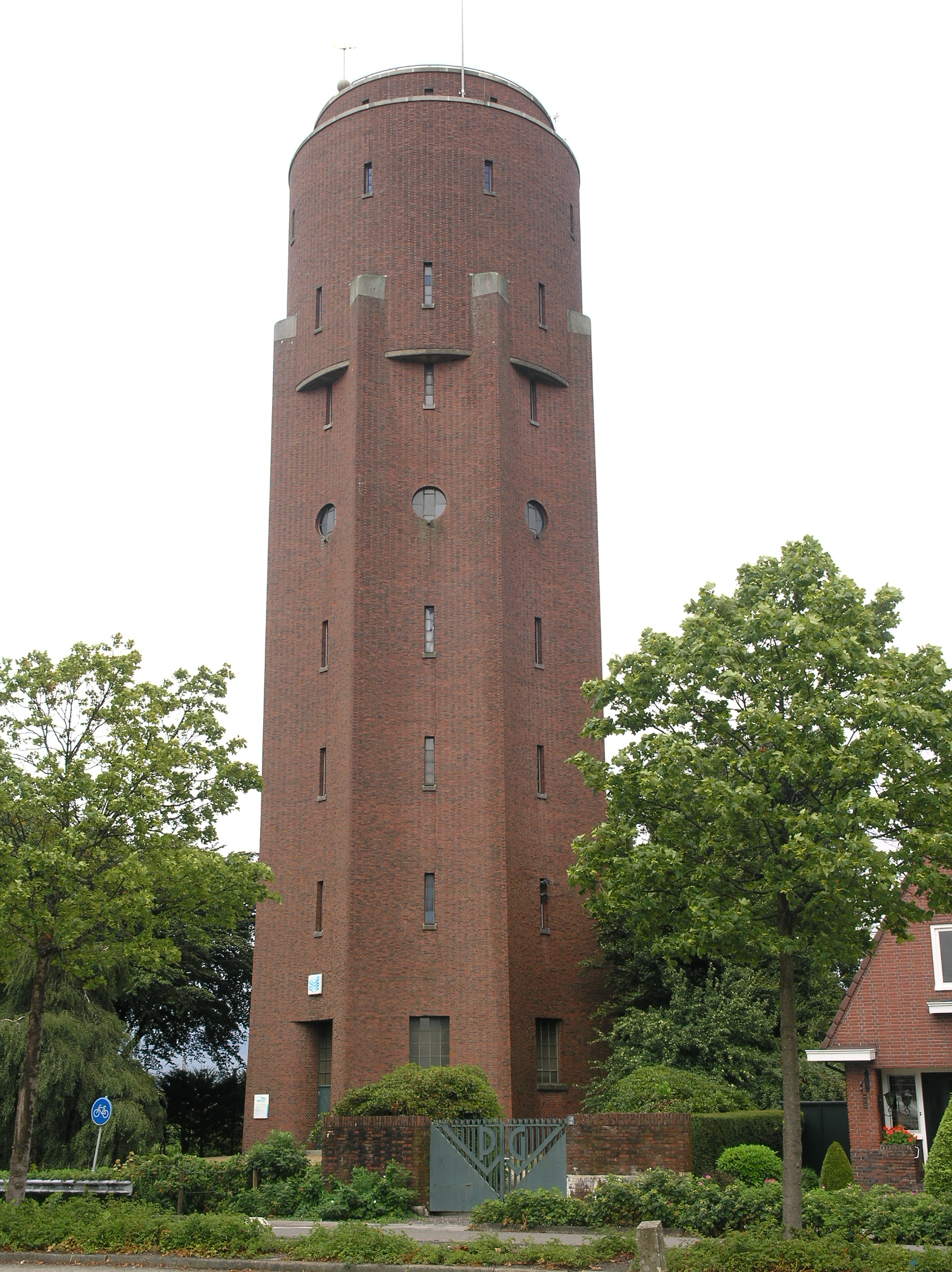
Old water tower in Oude Pekala

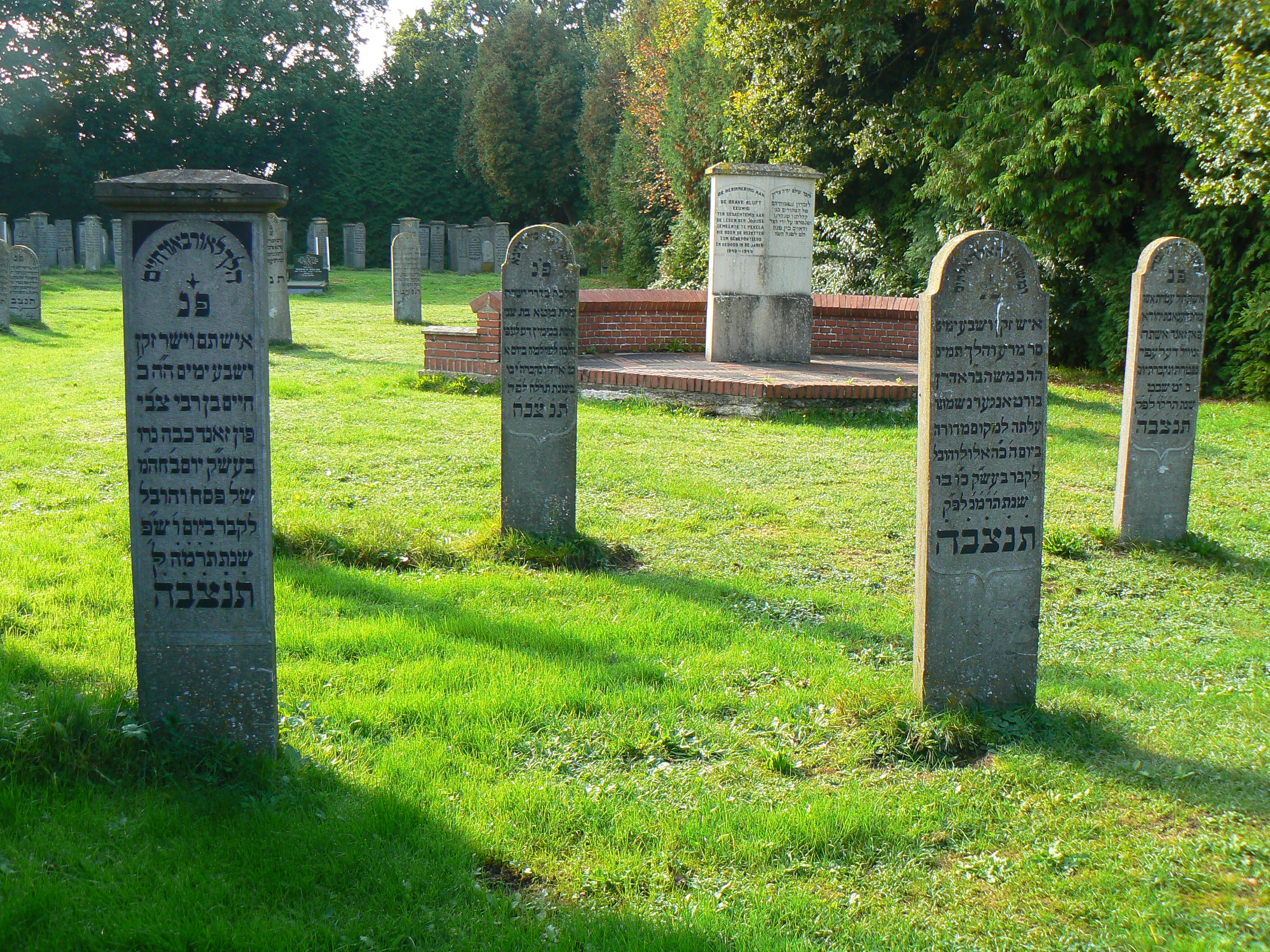
Jewish cemetery in Oude Pekela

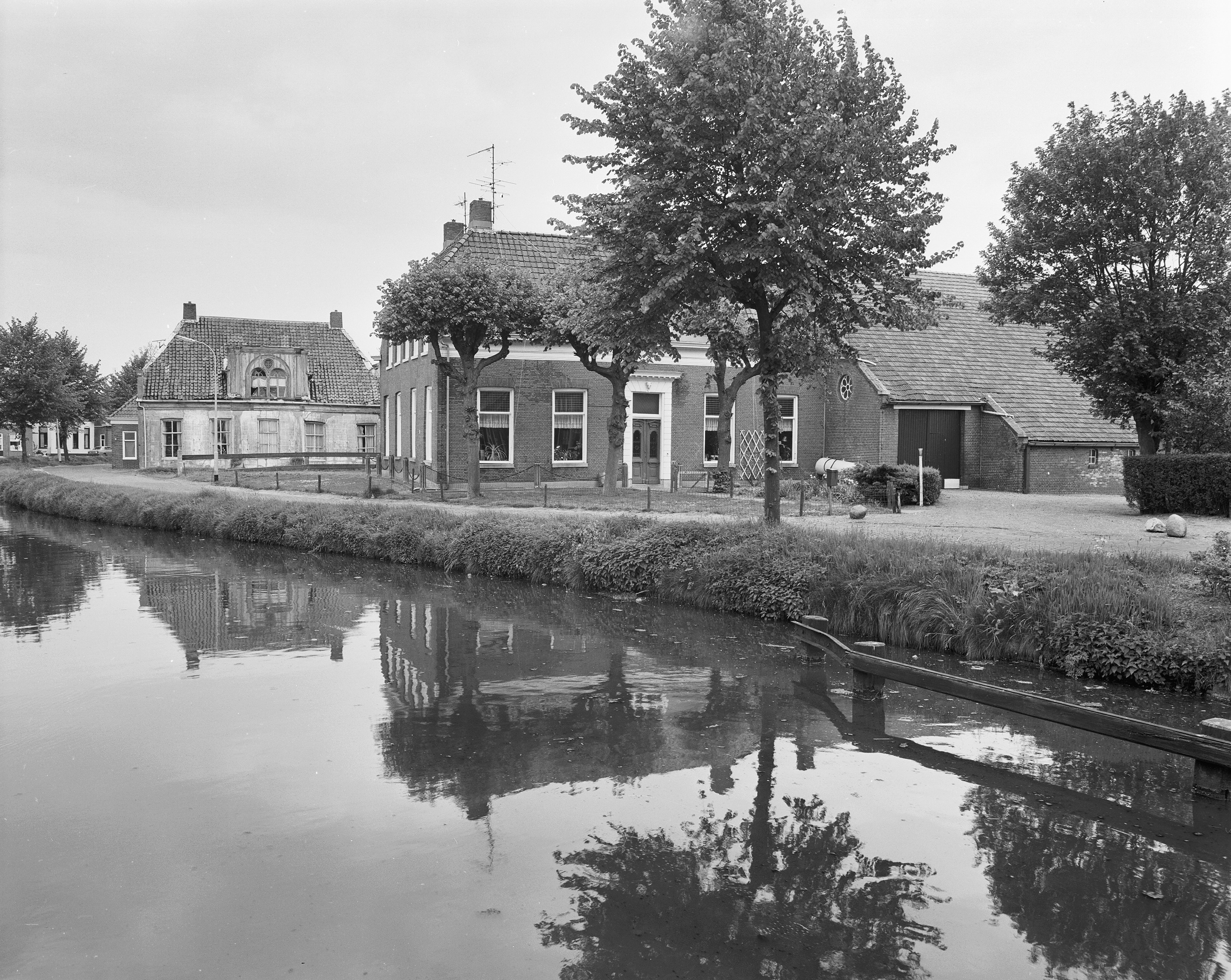
Oude Pekela (1976)

== Bibliography ==
- Bosgra, W.H. (1930). Uit Pekela's verleden (in Dutch). Oude Pekela: Feringa.
