= Wedde =

- Village
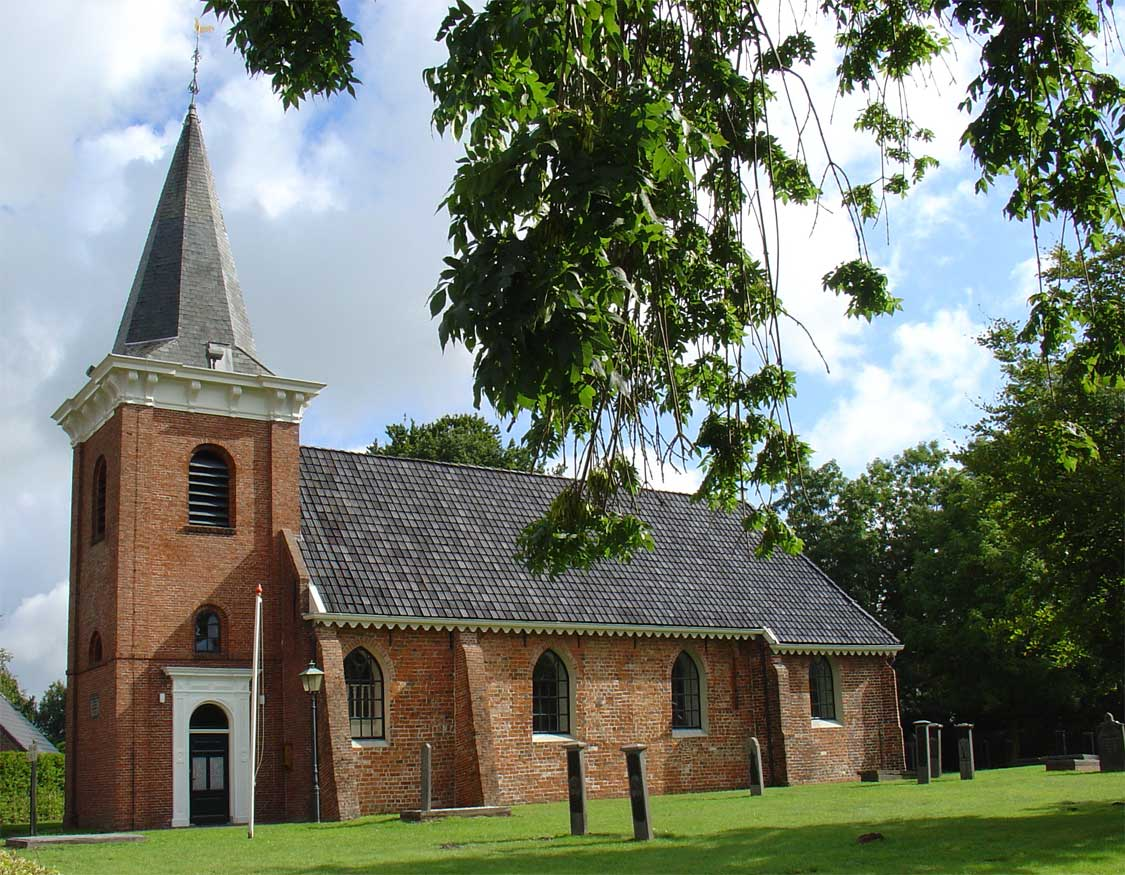
- Church of Wedde in 2008

- Location in the province of Groningen the Netherlands Wedde (Netherlands)
- Coordinates: 53°4′10″N 7°4′45″E
- Country: Netherlands
- Province: Groningen
- Municipality: Westerwolde

Area
  - Total: 0.72 km^{2} (0.28 sq mi)
- Elevation: 3 m (9.8 ft)

Population (2021)
  - Total: 600
  - Density: 830/km^{2} (2,200/sq mi)
- Postal code: 9698
- Area code: 0597
- ISO 3166 code: NL-GR

Wedde (Dutch pronunciation: [ˈʋɛdə]) is a village in the municipality Westerwolde in the province Groningen in the Netherlands. It is located 9 km southeast of Winschoten. The castle Wedderborg is located in the village.

== History ==
Most of Westerwolde was a raised bog with few inhabitants, however it formed a natural border between Groningen, East Frisia and the Prince-Bishopric of Münster, and therefore changed ownership many times during its history.

Wedde was located on the road between Groningen and Germany, and dates from the 12th century. The Westerwoldsche Aa flows through the village. In 1316, Westerwolde became part of Münster. In 1362, Egge I Addinga was given the heerlijkheid Westerwolde by the bishop of Münster, and started constructing the Wedderborg, a castle, in Wedde around 1370.

In 1619, Westerwolde was purchased by the city of Groningen, and Wedde remained subordinate to the city until 1798. It remained a separate municipality until 1968, when it was merged with Bellingwolde to form Bellingwedde. The new name Bellingwedde is a contraction of Bellingwolde and Wedde. In 2018, it became part of the new municipality of Westerwolde.

== Geselberg ==
Geselberg (literally: Scourge Mountain) is a hill near Wedde. Between 1587 and 1597, witch trials were held at Wedderborg, and 21 women and 1 man were burned at the stake at Geselberg. In 1597, witch trials were outlawed in the Dutch Republic, and Geselberg was only used for hangings and flagellation.

== Geography ==
Wedde is located centeṛ̣ west of the municipality Westerwolde, in the east of the province Groningen, in the northeast of the Netherlands. Wedde is an administrative neighbourhood (Dutch: buurt) in the district (Dutch: wijk) of Blijham.

== Gallery ==
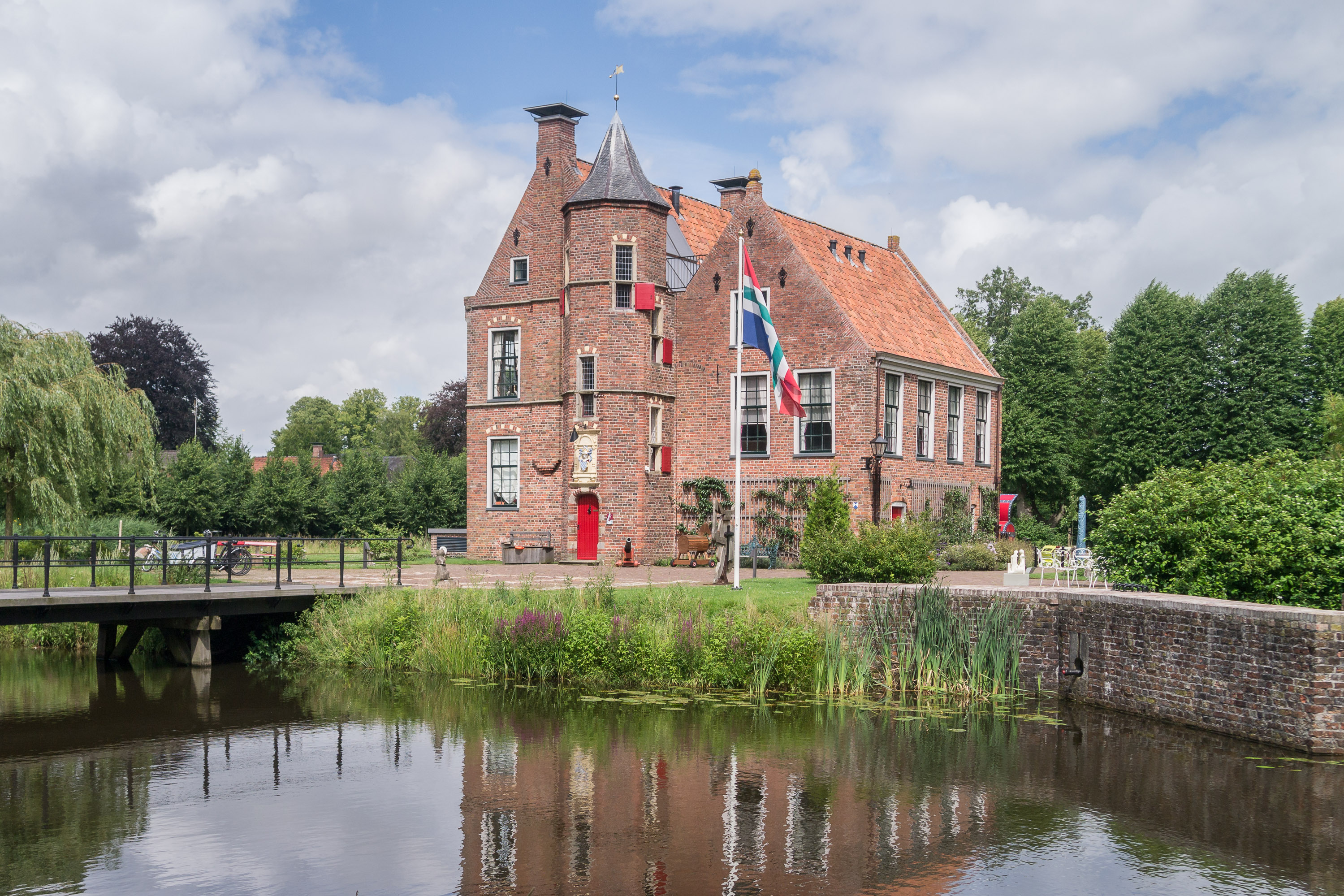
Wedderborg

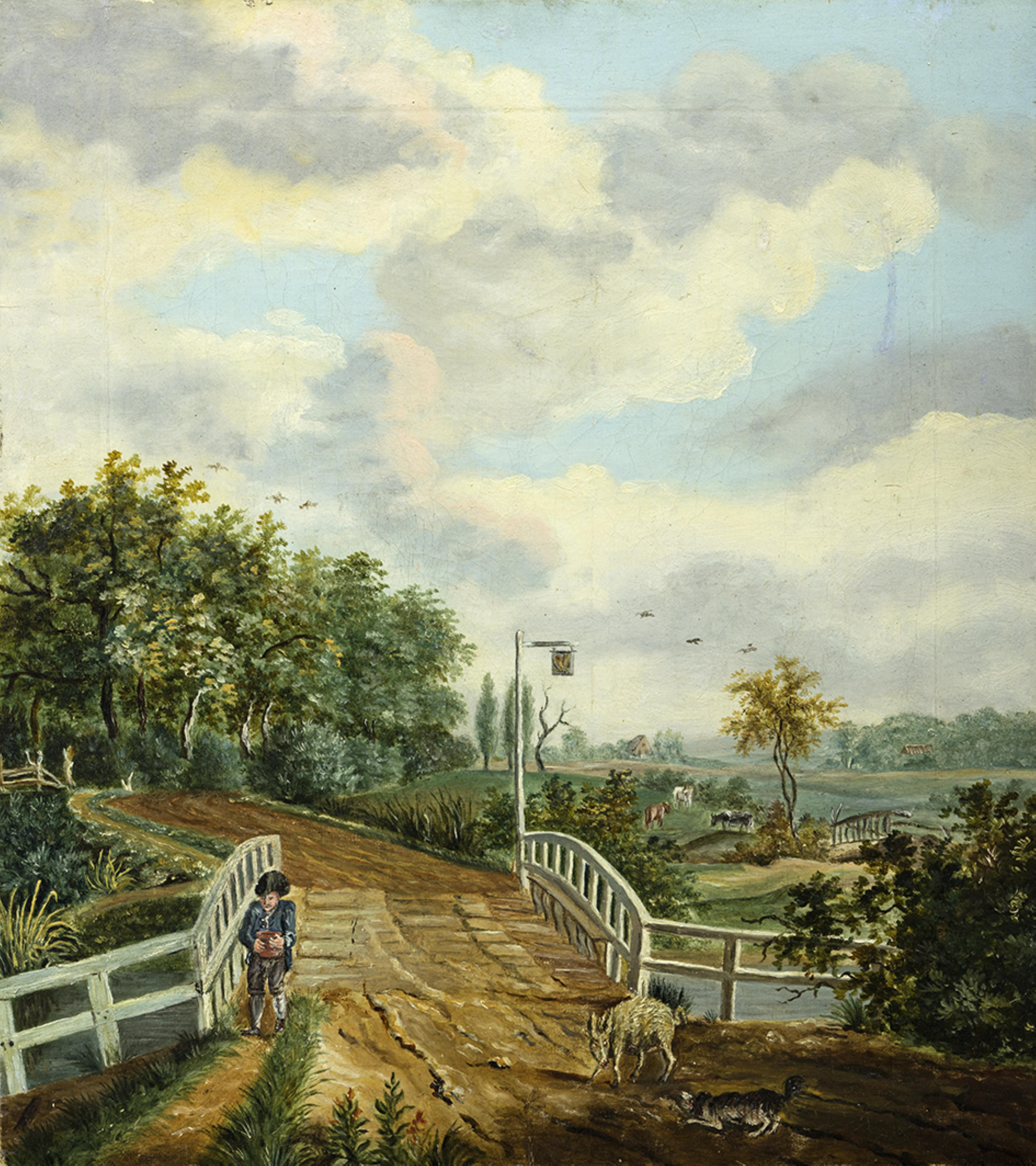
Painting of the bridge at Wedde by Assuerus Quaestius (1831)

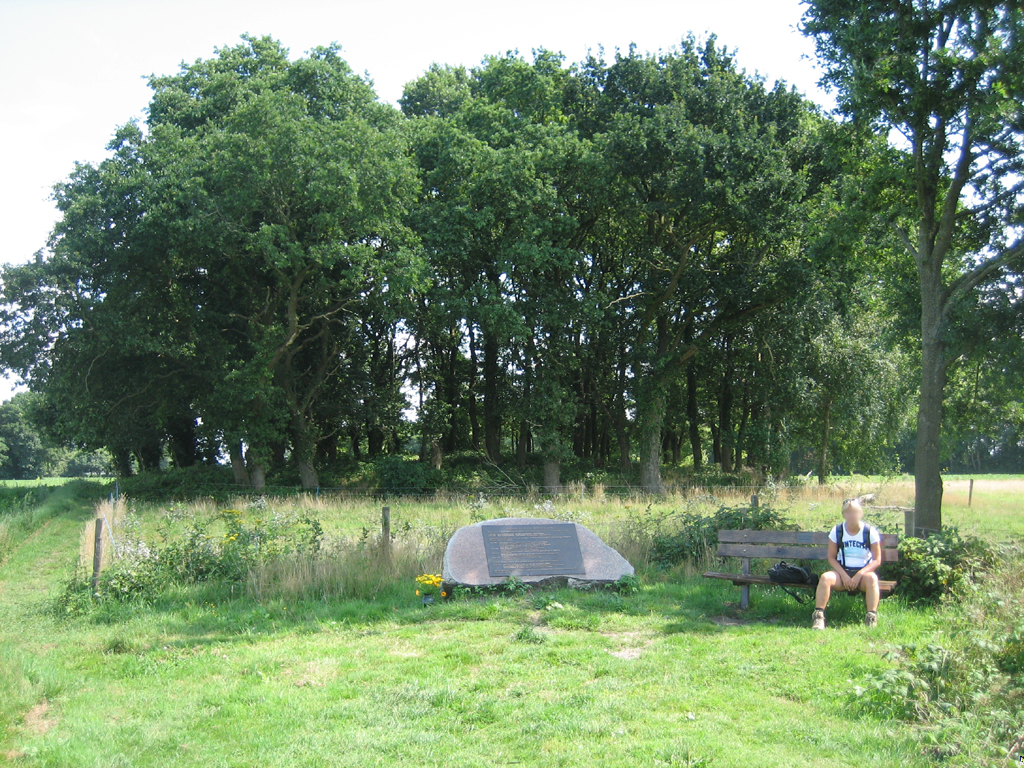
Geselberg

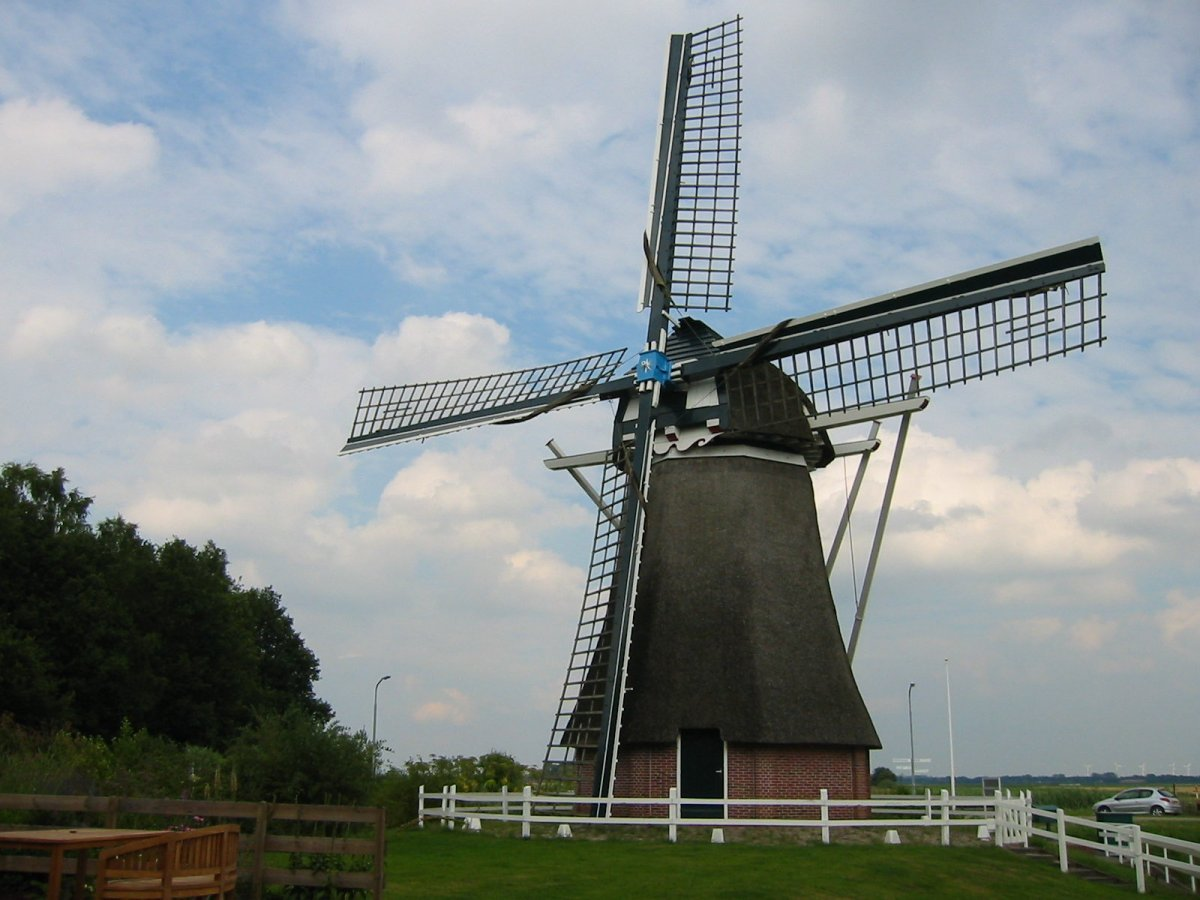
Weddermarke windmill
