= Bellingwolde =

- Village
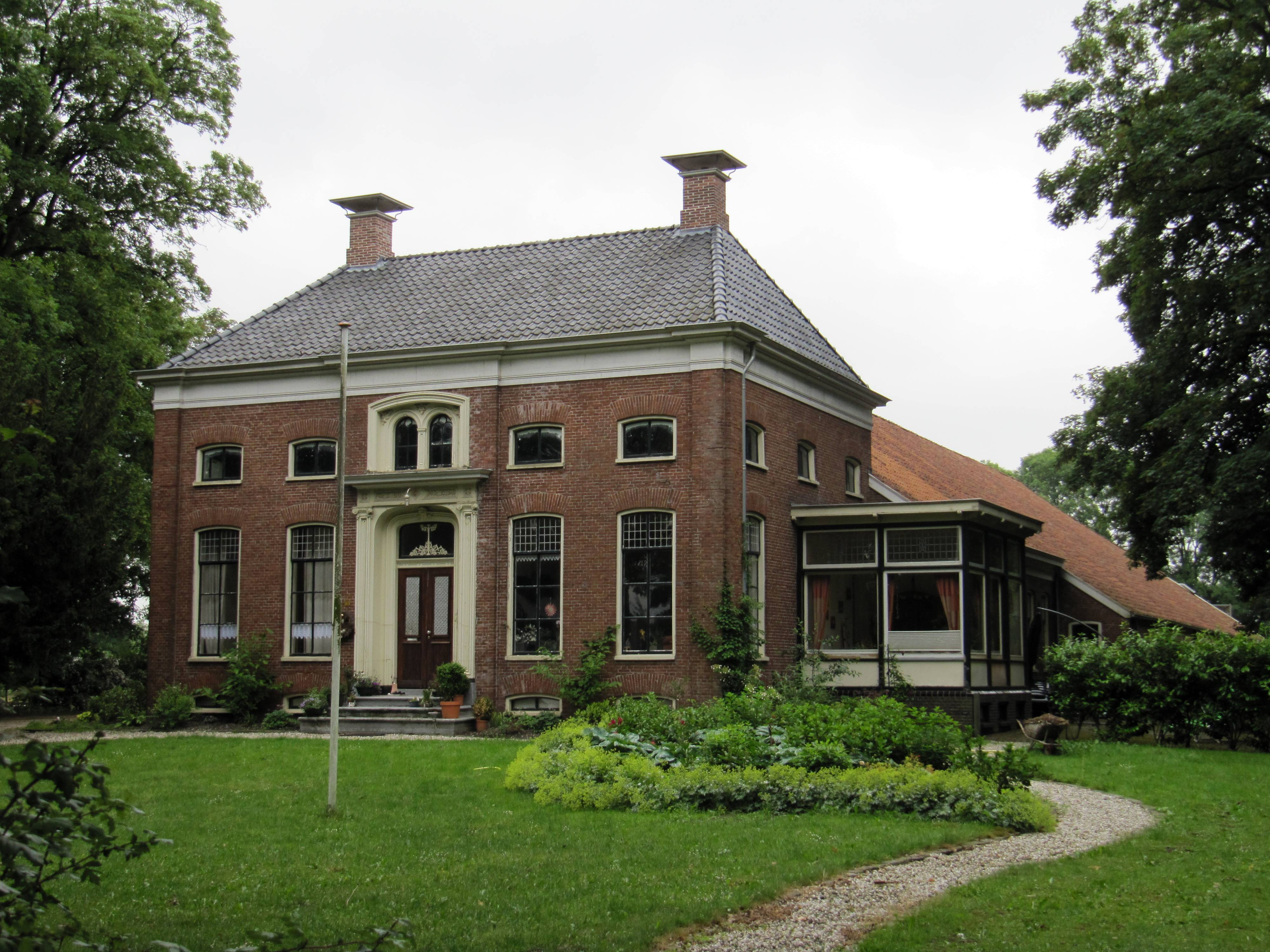
- An Oldambt farmhouse in Bellingwolde

- Location in the province of Groningen in the Netherlands Bellingwolde (Netherlands)
- Coordinates: 53°7′00″N 7°9′55″E
- Country: Netherlands
- Province: Groningen
- Municipality: Westerwolde

Area (2015)
  - Total: 451 ha (1,110 acres)
  - Land: 445 ha (1,100 acres)
  - Water: 6 ha (15 acres)

Population (2015)
  - Total: 2,655
  - Density: 597/km^{2} (1,550/sq mi)
- Postal code: 9695
- Area code: 0597

Bellingwolde (Dutch pronunciation: [ˌbɛlɪŋˈʋɔldə]; Gronings: Bennewolle) is a village with a population of 2,655 people in the municipality Westerwolde in the Netherlands. It is situated in the southeast of the region Oldambt, in the north of the region Westerwolde, and in the east of the province Groningen, at the border with Germany.

The settlement dates back to the 11th century. It flooded multiple times until the 16th century. In the 18th and 19th centuries agriculture prospered and large farmhouses were built. It was a separate municipality until it merged with Wedde into Bellingwedde in 1968.

Bellingwolde has a state protected village area with several monumental farmhouses. Other attractions are the Magnus Church, the Law House, Veldkamp's Mill, and Museum de Oude Wolden. There are four primary schools and a secondary school in the village.

== History ==
The origins of Bellingwolde, which was built on a sand ridge dividing the clay and peat ground, are in the 11th century.

The settlement flooded many times until parts of the Dollard were impoldered in the 16th century.

The agricultural settlement started to prosper in the 18th century. Large farmhouses were built in the 19th century.

Bellingwolde was a separate municipality until 1 September 1968, when it was merged with Wedde to form the new municipality Bellingwedde. The former municipality contained the villages of Bellingwolde, Oudeschans, and Vriescheloo, and the hamlets of Klein-Ulsda and Rhederbrug.

Bellingwolde became part of the new municipality of Westerwolde in 2018, when the municipalities of Bellingwedde and Vlagtwedde merged.

== Geography ==
Bellingwolde is located in the northeast of the municipality Westerwolde in the east of the province Groningen in the northeast of the Netherlands. The village is in the southeast of the region Oldambt and in the north of the region Westerwolde, situated between the river Westerwoldse Aa in the west and the canal B.L. Tijdenskanaal in the east.

The nearest city Winschoten is 8 km to the west. In between Winschoten and Bellingwolde is the village Blijham. In the northwest it is close to the village Oudeschans, which used to be called Bellingwolderschans (Sconce of Bellingwolde). In the south Bellingwolde is connected with the village Vriescheloo and the hamlet Rhederbrug. Bellingwolde is at the border of the Netherlands and Germany. The nearest German city is Papenburg, 16 km to the east, and the closest village is Wymeer.

Bellingwolde is an administrative district (Dutch: wijk) and neighbourhood (Dutch: buurt). The Bellingwolde district has a total area of 4,364 ha (16.85 sq mi) of which 4,295 ha (16.58 sq mi) is land and 69 ha (0.27 sq mi) is water. It is one of three districts in the municipality of Bellingwedde, the other two being Oost and Blijham. The Bellingwolde district contains the neighbourhoods Bellingwolde, Vriescheloo, Rhederbrug (western part), Oudeschans, Klein-Ulsda, and some scattered houses. The Bellingwolde neighbourhood has a total area of 451 ha (1.74 sq mi) of which 445 ha (1.72 sq mi) is land and 6 ha (0.023 sq mi) is water.

== Demography ==
Bellingwolde neighborhood
Age range	Pct.
0–15 years old	16%
15–25 years old	11%
25–45 years old	23%
45–65 years old	27%
65+ years old	23%

In 2015, the Bellingwolde neighborhood had a total population of 2,400, of which 1,230 were men and 1,170 are women. The population density was 530/km^{2} (1,400/sq mi). Of the total population 43% was unmarried, 42% was married, 8% was widowed, and 7% was divorced. The district had 1,130 households, 37% were single-person households, 32% were multi-person households without children, and 30% were multi-person households with children.

20% of the total population was allochtoon, a person with at least one parent born outside the Netherlands. This percentage is divided into 10% Western allochtonen (Note: Western is used in the definition of Statistics Netherlands meaning from Europe, North-America, Oceania, Indonesia and Japan.) and 10% non-Western allochtonen. There is an asylum seekers' center (Dutch: asielzoekerscentrum) in Bellingwolde, where refugees from Syria and other countries are housed pending the outcome of their asylum procedures.

In 2015, the Bellingwolde district had a total population of 4,205 and a population density of 96/km^{2} (250/sq mi).

== Culture ==
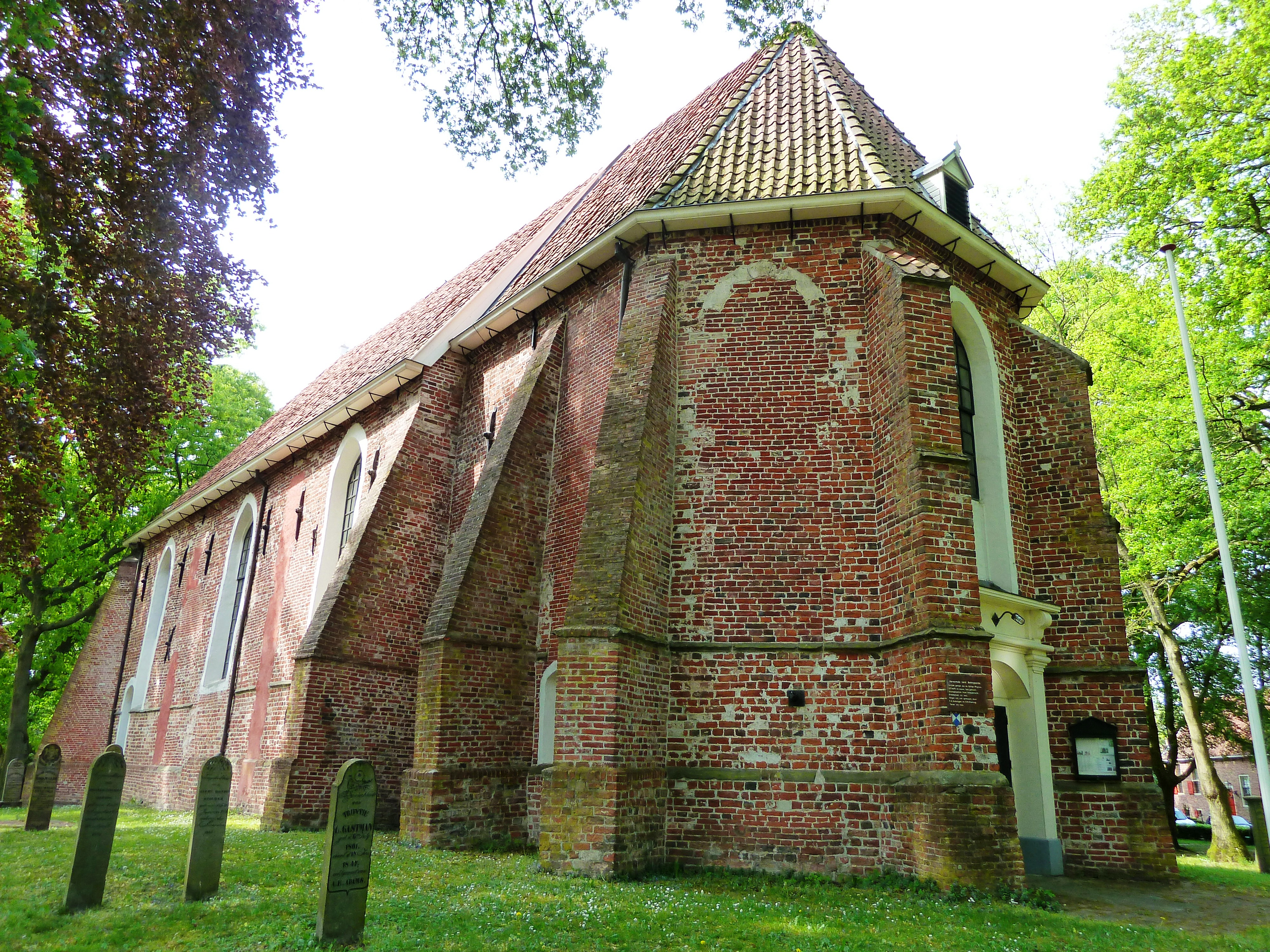
The 16th-century Magnus Church

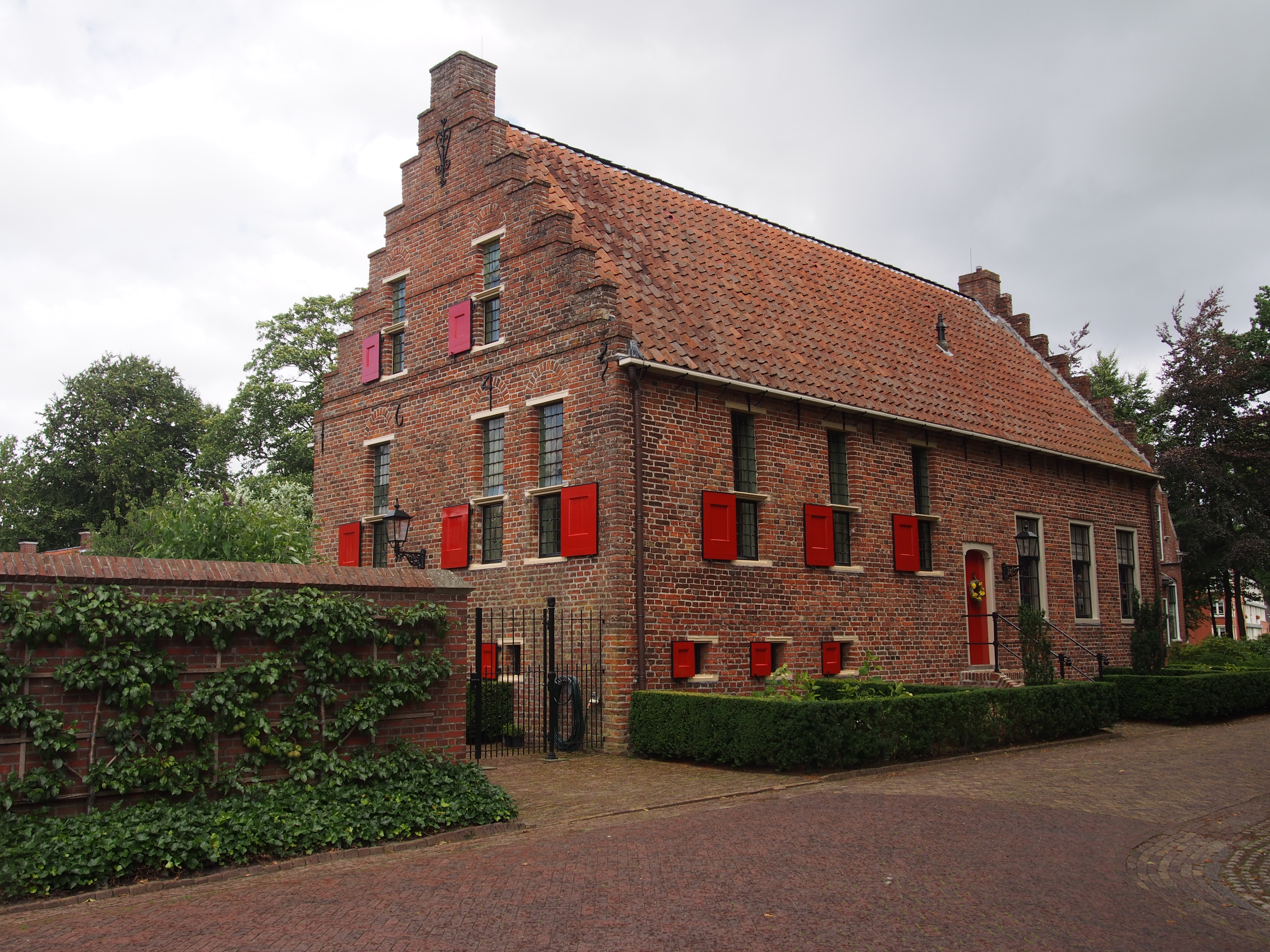
The 17th-century Law House

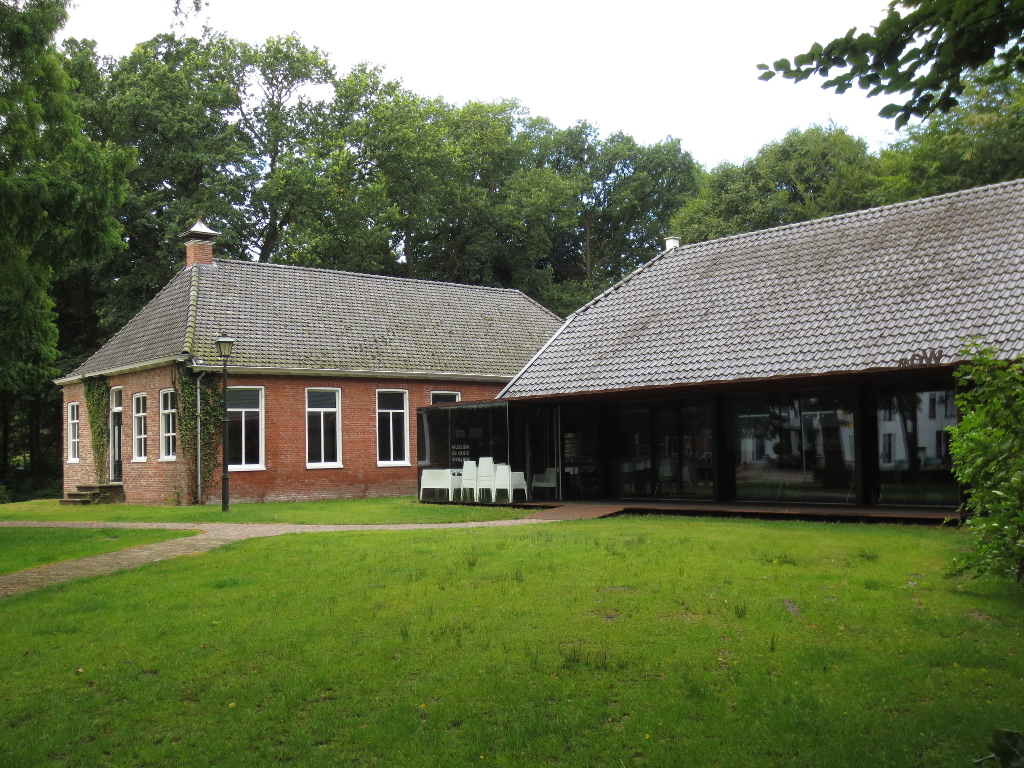
Museum de Oude Wolden is a regional museum about the art and history of Oldambt and Westerwolde

Since 2009, Bellingwolde has a state protected village area (Dutch: beschermd dorpsgezicht) with many monumental buildings among which are the Magnus Church (16th century), the Law House (17th century), the Veldkamp's Mill (19th century), and about twenty farmhouses.

The Museum de Oude Wolden is a regional museum about the art and history of Oldambt and Westerwolde. It has a permanent exhibition of paintings by magic realist Lodewijk Bruckman and temporary exhibitions.

There is a public library, which is opened three days per week.

== Infrastructure ==
The provincial road N969 connects Bellingwolde to Blijham in the west and Rhederbrug and the German border in the southeast. The provincial road N973 connects Bellingwolde to Vriescheloo and Wedde in the southwest, but is discontinued as a numbered road in northeastern direction. The nearest highway is the A7 (E22) with its nearest exit at Oudeschans just north of Bellingwolde.

The nearest railway is the Harlingen–Nieuweschans railway north of Bellingwolde, with its nearest stations in Winschoten and Bad Nieuweschans. There are two bus lines, operated by Qbuzz, passing through Bellingwolde and connecting it to nearby settlements and the two railway stations:

- Line 12: Winschoten – Blijham – Bellingwolde – Blijham – Winschoten
- Line 811: Bad Nieuweschans – Klein-Ulsda – Oudeschans – Bellingwolde – Vriescheloo – Veelerveen – Vlagtwedde

== Education ==
There are three primary schools located in Bellingwolde. The two public schools are Oosterschool and Westerschool. The Protestant school is De Wegwijzer.

The secondary school Dollard College has a location with 170 students in Bellingwolde. At this school location, the students can do the first two years of vmbo, havo, and vwo, and the final two years of the vmbo theoretical program.

There are no institutions for tertiary education located in Bellingwolde.

== Notable people ==
- Jan Mulder (born 1945), footballer, writer, and commentator
- Lou Ottens (1926–2021), a Dutch engineer, inventor of the cassette tape
