= Museum de Oude Wolden =

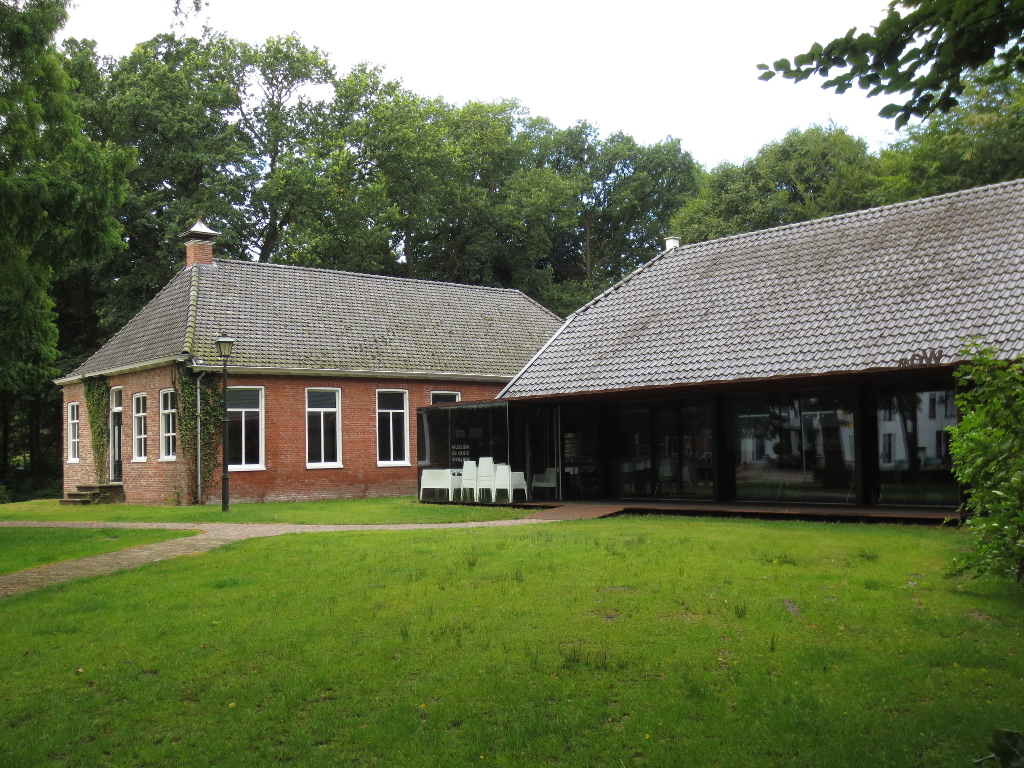
- The old building with the new wing in 2013

- Location in Groningen in the Netherlands
- Established: 10 August 1973
- Location: Hoofdweg 161; Bellingwolde, Netherlands
- Coordinates: 53.1131°N 7.1619°E
- Type: Regional museum Art museum History museum
- Visitors: 4,942 (2016)
- Director: Obby Veenstra
- Public transit access: Tweekarspelenweg; Bus lines: 12, 811
- Website: museumdeoudewolden.nl

Museum de Oude Wolden (Dutch pronunciation: [myˈzeːjʏm də ˌʔʌudə ˈʋɔldə(n)]; English: Museum The Old Wolds), abbreviated as MOW, is a regional museum in the village of Bellingwolde in the Netherlands. The museum focuses on art and history of the regions of Oldambt and Westerwolde in the east of the province of Groningen.

The museum opened on 10 August 1973. In the first decades, it primarily exhibited historical objects documenting everyday life. In the late 1990s, the museum started to exhibit artworks of artist collective De Ploeg and magic realist painter Lodewijk Bruckman. Since 2012, it has a permanent display of paintings by Bruckman and temporary exhibitions.

The museum is an independent foundation that is mainly funded by the municipality of Bellingwedde. From 2013 to 2016, the museum had around 4,700 visitors per year. It is one of the lesser-visited museums in Groningen.

== Location ==
Museum de Oude Wolden is located at the Hoofdweg in the village Bellingwolde in the municipality Bellingwedde in the east of the province Groningen near the Dutch–German border. It is situated in the south of the region Oldambt and in the north of the region Westerwolde.

The old museum building is the restored backhouse (Dutch: achterhuis) of a former mansion (Dutch: herenhuis) of which the fronthouse was destroyed during a World War II bombing. In 1977, the building was expanded with a new wing for 150,000 guilders (68,000 euro). In 2012, the building was renovated and received a new glass entrance, which cost 223,000 euro in total.

== History ==
Streekmuseum de Oude Wolden (Regional Museum the Old Wolds) was opened on 10 August 1973 by the mayor of Bellingwedde Jurjen Jan Hoeksema. In the late 1960s, the province of Groningen requested the national government for subsidy to open a new museum in Bellingwolde. The subsidy was not granted, but the state paid indirectly for the restoration of the museum building via a subsidized employment project.

In 1976, the museum exhibited primarily historical objects from the regions of Oldambt and Westerwolde, such as agricultural machines, traditional costumes, and archaeological and geological finds. After the expansion in 1977, the museum had enough space to hold temporary exhibitions, group the historical objects thematically, and display a 19th-century grocery store inventory. By the late 1980s, a barber shop and shoemaker's inventory were shown in the museum. In 1988, the newspaper Nieuwsblad van het Noorden called the museum "charming" and wrote: "A museum like De Oude Wolden is meaningful because of its rather complete documentation of everyday life in the 19th and early 20th century."

In 1998, the museum started to exhibit paintings by artists of De Ploeg, an artist collective established in the city Groningen. In 1999, the museum also exhibited paintings by Lodewijk Bruckman, who lived in Bellingwedde for some years. At the time, the press described De Oude Wolden as a museum with historical artefacts and artworks by De Ploeg and Bruckman. In 2003, De Ploeg celebrated their 85th birthday with an exhibition in the museum. In 2010, seven 17–19th-century icons with an estimated value of 23,000 euro were stolen during a break-in in the museum. At the time, the museum offered a reward of 2,500 euro for tips that would lead to the recovery of the icons.

The museum dropped the word streek (regional) from its name and now calls itself Museum de Oude Wolden (Museum the Old Wolds). Since the renovation in 2012, the historical objects and the artworks by De Ploeg are no longer on permanent display, the museum now focuses on art, region, and history with Bruckman's paintings and temporary exhibitions. In 2017, the museum became an independent foundation, although the municipality of Bellingwedde still owns the building and the collection.

== Exhibitions ==
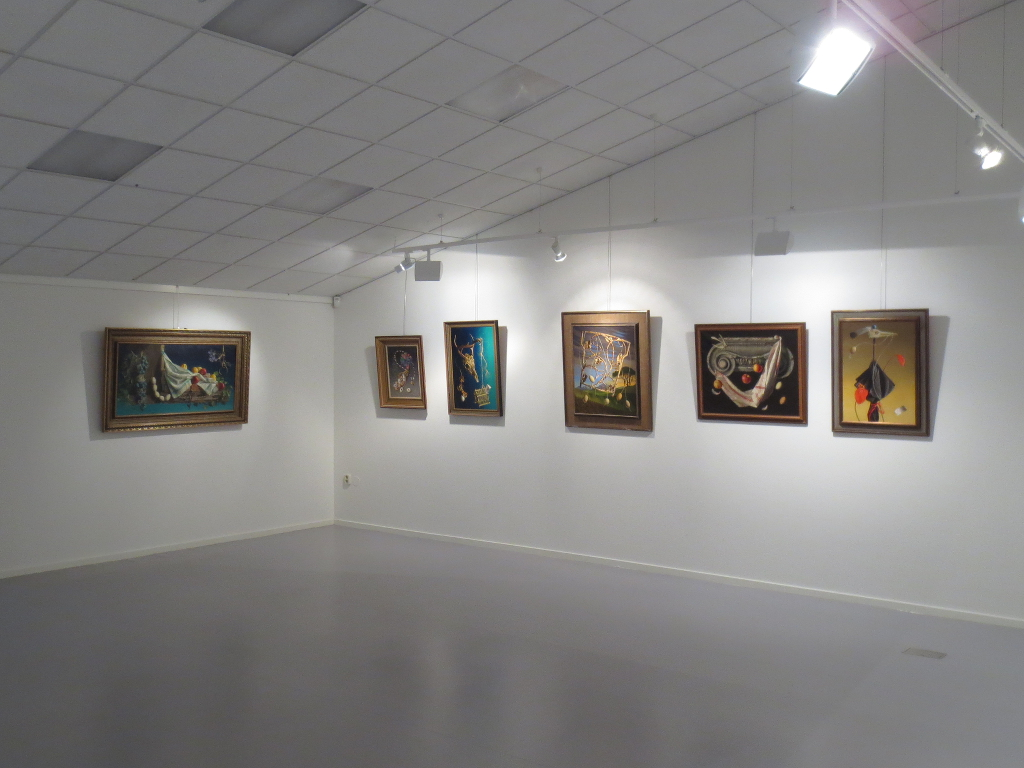
The permanent exhibition of paintings by Lodewijk Bruckman

=== Lodewijk Bruckman ===
The museum has a permanent exhibition of paintings by Lodewijk Bruckman (1903–1995). Bruckman lived in Bellingwolde in a hotel opposite to the museum from 1987 to 1989. He donated 21 paintings to the Bellingwedde municipality in 1988. These paintings, which are now exhibited in the museum, are mostly still lifes in a style which is described as realistic, surrealistic, or magic realistic.

=== Temporary exhibitions ===
The museum has two concurrent temporary exhibitions: a larger exhibition spanning several months and a smaller monthly exhibition that features a regional artist. The smaller exhibitions are called 24K, which refers to an area around the museum with a radius of 24 kilometers where the artists are from and the supposed 24 carat quality of the artworks.

The larger temporary exhibitions since the renovation in 2012 include:

- Typisch Hollands! (2012; Typically Dutch!) with works of nineteen Dutch artists
- Het einde, een nieuw begin (2012–2013; The end, a new beginning) with works by De Ploeg
- Weer terug in Groningen (2013; Back again in Groningen) with works by Chinese artist Zhuang Hong Yi
- Vooruitgangsvisioenen (2013; Visions of progress) about the history of canalization in Westerwolde
- 24K XL (2014) with works of 27 regional artists from previous 24K exhibitions
- Net echt (2014; Like real) with more than 40 works by Lodewijk Bruckman
- Voor de draad ermee (2014–2015; Coming clean) about quilting and textile art
- Want reizen is ook verdwalen (2015; Because travelling is also getting lost) with works by Dutch artist Yvonne Struys
- Streekgenoten (2015; Fellow regionmen) with photography of the region Westerwolde
- Onder Vuur (2015–2016; Under Fire) about the First Münster War of 1665–1666
- 24K XL (2016) with works of 20 regional artists from previous 24K exhibitions
- 100% Maya (2016) with works by Dutch artist Maya Wildevuur
- Duizend Dingen (2016–2017; Thousand Things) with various objects and art works from the museum collection
- Trillingen (2017; Vibrations) with works by 24 artists of the collective VanTyNaarLo
- Uit Siberië (2017; From Siberia) with works by artists from Tyumen, Siberia
- Verknipt (2017–2018; Cut up) with works by quilting collective De Duikvlucht

== Administration ==
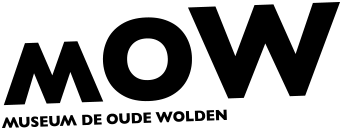
Logo of the museum

Year	Visitors	Year	Visitors
2003	2,636	2010	2,922
2004	2,011	2011	2,906
2005	2,043	2012	1,798
2006	1,812	2013	4,800
2007	1,792	2014	4,350
2008	1,965	2015	4,683
2009	3,221	2016	4,942

The museum is a foundation. It has board of three members, a small paid staff (1.7 full-time equivalent or FTE), and around 20 volunteers. Peter Yspeert has been the foundation chairman since 2017. Obby Veenstra has been the museum director (0.5 FTE) since 2010. In 2010, the municipality of Bellingwedde has guaranteed to fund 95% of the museum's budget for the next fifteen years. The annual costs for the municipality are 168,500 euro. The rest of the budget comes from other subsidies and (ticket) sales.

The entrance fee for the museum is €4.50, but it is free on Wednesdays, during special events, and for children under 18. In 2008, the annual total of 1,965 visitors included around 700 paying visitors. In 2014, a municipal council member claimed the amount of paying visitors was 50% in 2011, 35% in 2012, and 32% in 2013, and director Veenstra claimed it has been around 40% for years.

In the period 2003–2012, the museum had around 1,800 to 3,200 visitors per year. In 2012, when the museum was closed for renovation from January to early July, it had 1,798 visitors. In 2013–2016, the museum had between 4,350 and 4,942 visitors per year. Although it is the most-visited museum in the eastern part of the province of Groningen, it is one of the lesser-visited museums in the entire province.

De Oude Wolden is a member of Museumhuis Groningen (Groningen Museum House), which is an umbrella organization for museums and heritage institutions in the province of Groningen. From 2004 to 2009, the museum was registered in the Museumregister Nederland (Netherlands Museum Register), a quality mark for museums in the Netherlands, but the registration was not renewed for several years. The museum has again been registered since 2016.
