= Rechthuis (Bellingwolde) =

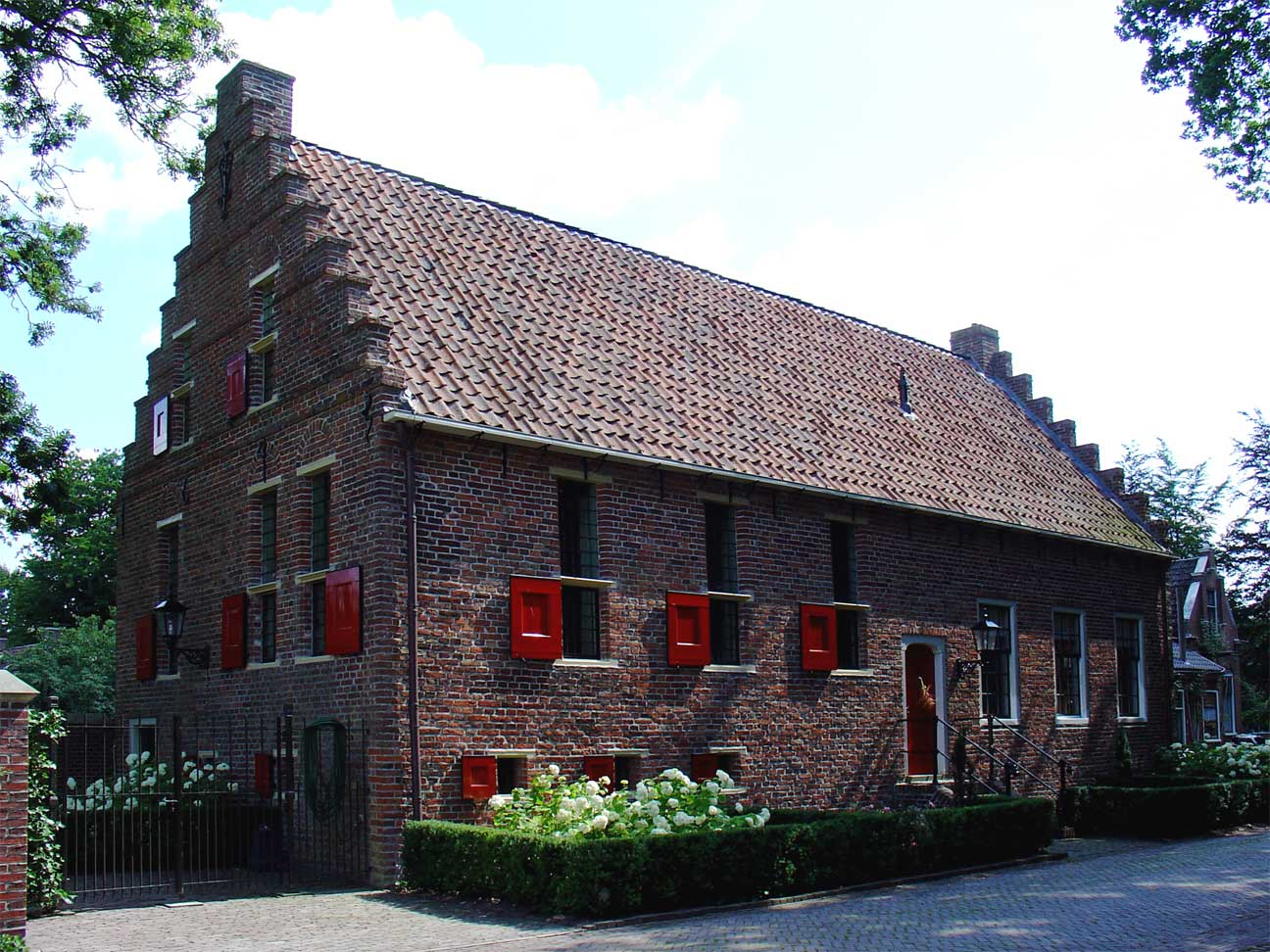
- The Rechthuis in 2008

- Location within Groningen (province)

General information
- Type: Former courthouse
- Location: Hoofdweg 235; Bellingwolde, Netherlands
- Coordinates: 53°7′15″N 7°9′59″E
- Completed: 1643

The Rechthuis (Dutch pronunciation: [ˈrɛxtɦœys]; English: Law House) is a former courthouse in the village of Bellingwolde in the Netherlands. The building with two crow-stepped gables was established in 1643 and used as a civil court for the area Bellingwolde-Blijham until 1811. The building has been a national heritage site since 1972. It is currently used as a private residence.

== Building ==
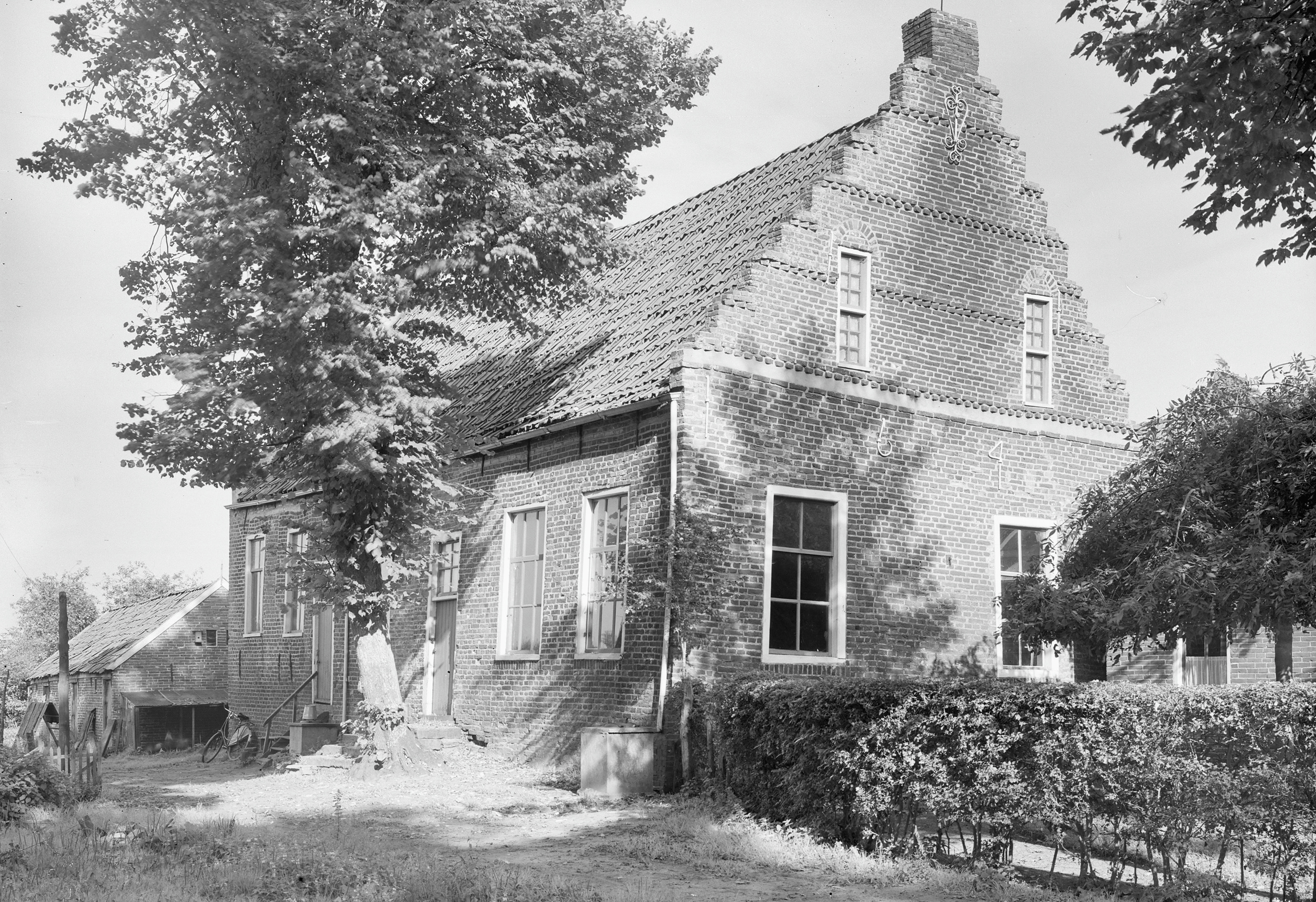
The building in 1938, several years before its restoration in the 1950s

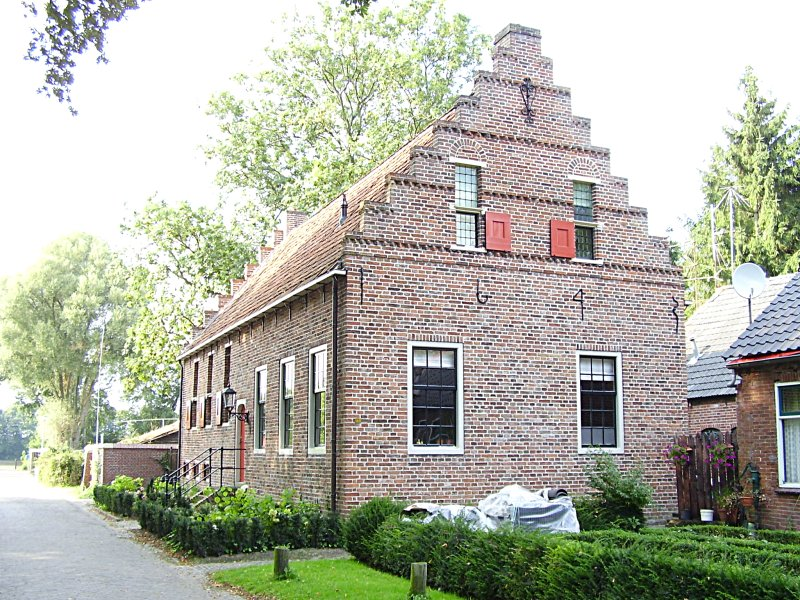
The restored building in 2005

The Rechthuis is located at the Hoofdweg (English: Main Road), near the Magnus Church, in the center of the village of Bellingwolde in the east of the province of Groningen near the Dutch–German border. It is situated in the north of the region of Westerwolde.

The building was established in 1643. One side of the building has a 17th-century style, the other side has an 18th-century style. The building has been restored in 1956–1957 after it was dilapidated.

The rectangular building has a saddle roof with the ridge parallel to the road. On the short sides, it has crow-stepped gables with small windows, some of which have shutters. Both gables are dated "1643" with the numbers as anchor plates. In the one half of the building is a semi-basement with a room above it, in the other half of the building is a hall.

The Rechthuis has been a national heritage site (Dutch: rijksmonument) since 1972. Part of the village of Bellingwolde including the Rechthuis has been a protected village area (Dutch: beschermd dorpsgezicht) since 2009.

== Use ==
=== Courthouse ===
The Rechthuis was used as a courthouse for civil cases in the heerlijkheid of Bellingwolde-Blijham from 1643 to 1811. Before the current building was established, there might have been another courthouse at the same location as early as 1456.

The judge (Dutch: richter [sic]) of the courthouse was appointed by the city of Groningen and lived in the nearby Rigtersborg in Bellingwolde. In the hall of the building, he held three or four sessions per month and each session handled usually more than twenty cases. The courthouse was also used by the magistrate (Dutch: drost) of Wedde.

In 1811, the courthouse in Bellingwolde was closed. The nearest court was now in the city of Winschoten.

=== Residence ===
After the courthouse was closed, the building became private property. In 1937, the building was bought by the municipality of Bellingwolde. The building is currently again privately owned. As a private residence, it cannot be visited by the public.
