= Westerwolde =

Westerwolde may refer to:

- Westerwolde (region), a region in the Netherlands
- Westerwolde (municipality), a municipality in the region
