= Oldambt =

Oldambt may refer to:

- Oldambt (municipality), a municipality in Groningen, Netherlands
- Oldambt (region), a region in Groningen, Netherlands
