= Local museum =

Museum that covers local history

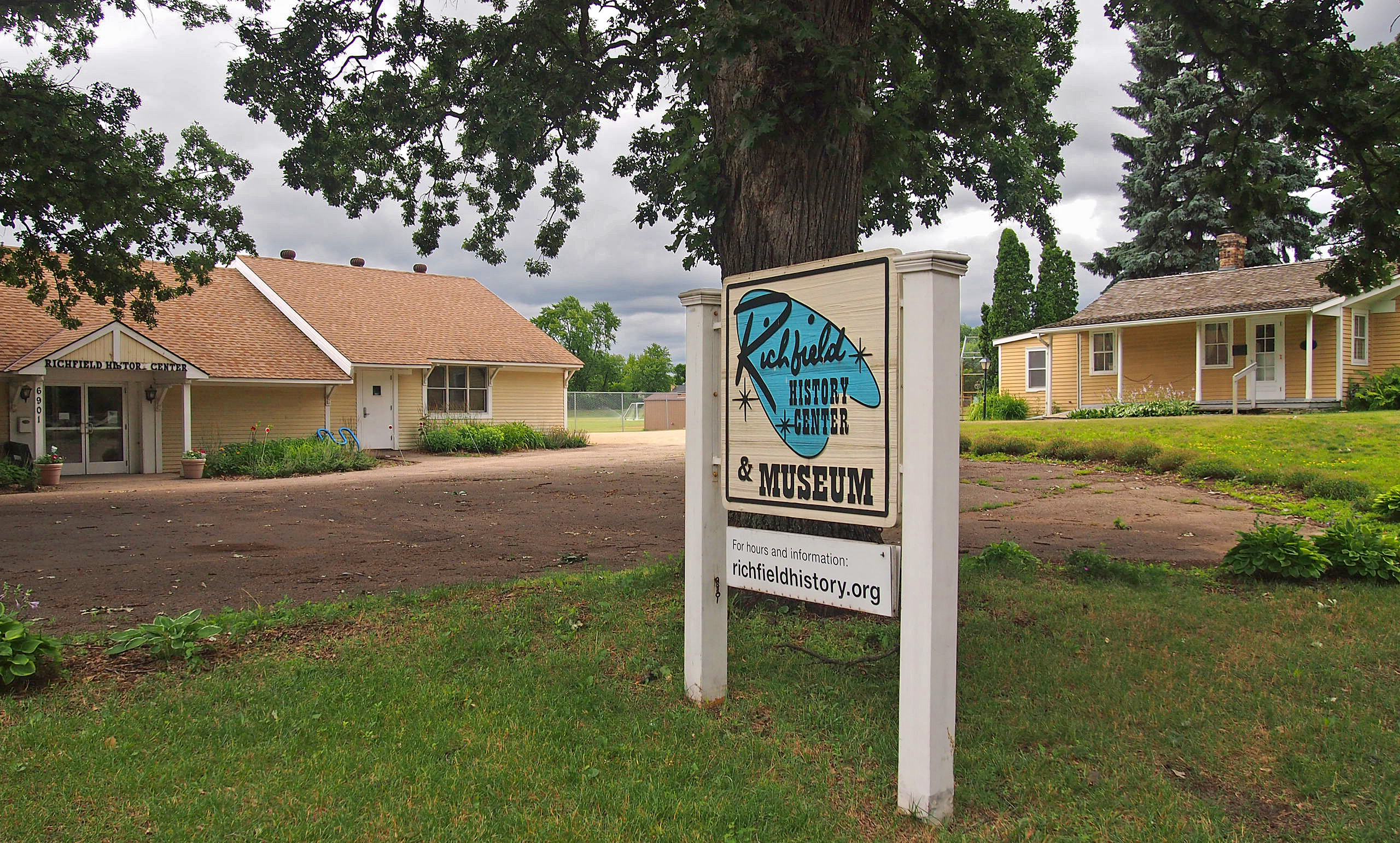
Richfield History Center & Museum is a local museum in Richfield, Minnesota

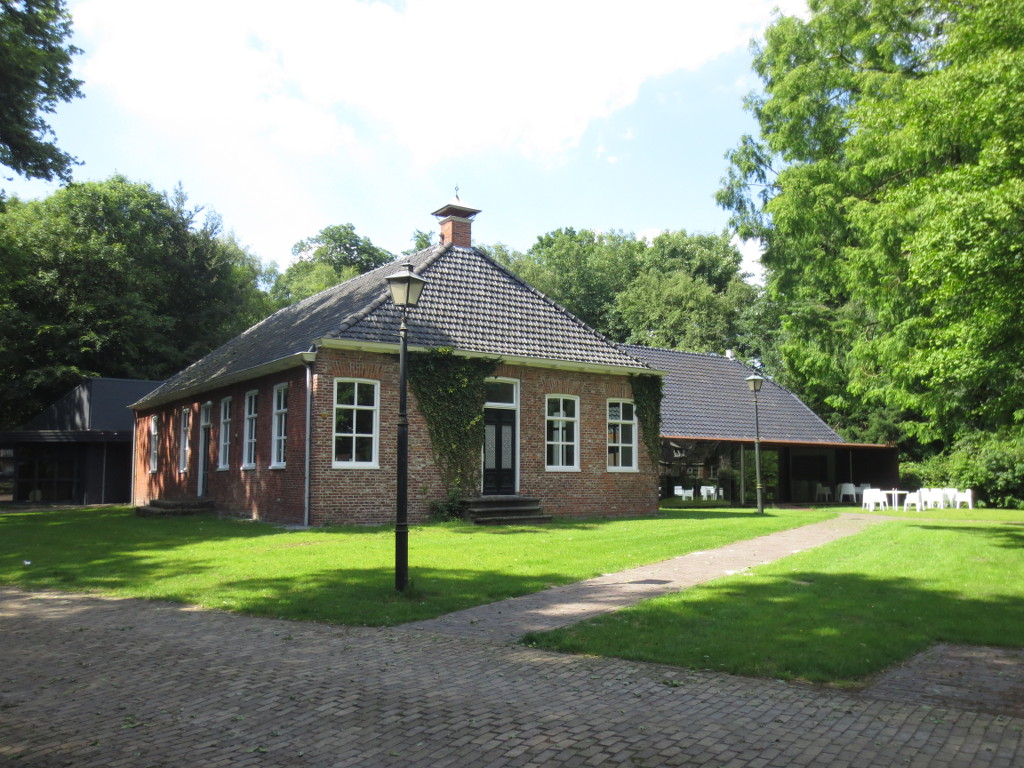
Museum de Oude Wolden is a local museum about art and history in Bellingwolde, Netherlands.

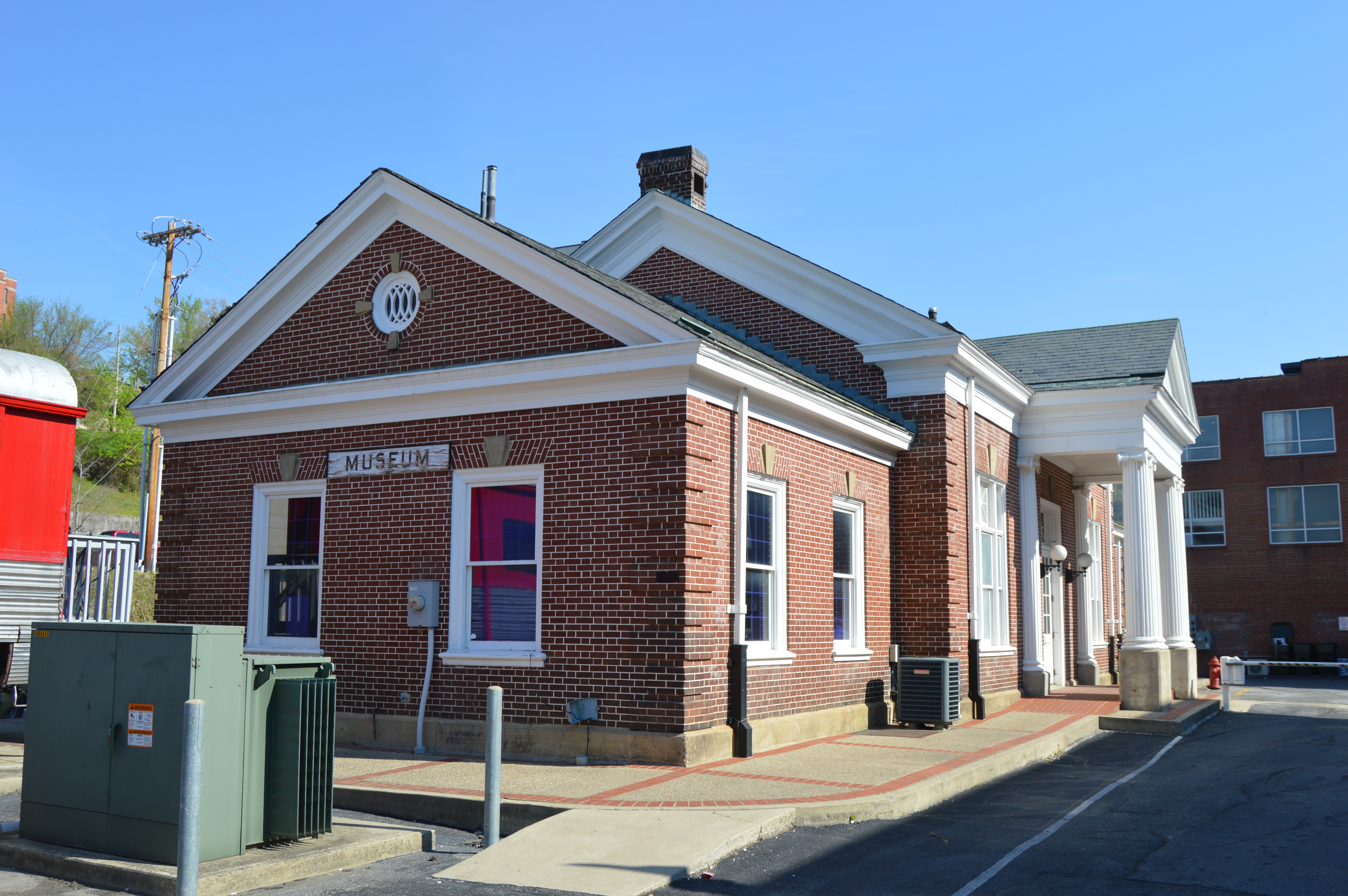
Big Sandy Heritage Center is a local museum about history and culture in Pikeville, Kentucky.

A local museum or local history museum is a type of museum that shows the historical development of a place/region (local history) using exhibits. These museums usually maintain a collection of historic three-dimensional objects which are exhibited in displays. Such museums are often small in nature and generally have a low budget for their running costs. As such, many of the collections are compiled, cataloged, and interpreted by amateur historians as well as professionals.

These museums can cover a governmental defined unit such as a town, city, county, or parish or they can cover an area defined within the museum's mission. In the United States while some museums may be part of the local government or receive funding from them in some way. However, most local history museums are usually self-funded. These museums can also run as independent organizations or they can managed by an accompanying local historical society which also will maintain an archive of local records in addition to the museum's three-dimensional object collection.

Local history museums are frequently housed in a historically significant or thematically typical building; it is often a former public building such as a school building, a former courthouse, or city/town hall since the structure, which was already owned by the municipality and can continue its use as a in the public realm as a museum. Other times museums are located in repurposed commercial buildings that had significance for the area such as a bank or a railroad depot. Many local museums are also open-air museums in which several historical buildings from the area have been collected in some museum villages and rebuilt in a new location.

In some cases the character of the local history museum is superimposed with the representation of a famous or well-known person from the area, or focuses on a single branch of the economy that was or is particularly formative for the region.

Local history museums offer the interpretation of the everyday lives of ordinary people and the unique histories that locale may offer. These museums also offer a more in-depth look into the details of how national and international events affected the locale represented by the museum.

== Regional variations ==
In Germany, a specific type of local museum is a Heimatmuseum, a museum dedicated to the unique German concept of heimat, a form of local cultural identity.

== Challenges ==
Small local museums face many challenges. One issue is money. Many local museums don't have enough funds to keep running smoothly. These museums often operate with tight budgets, usually less than $250,000 annually, and rely on a small staff with multiple responsibilities. Staff members in these museums often need to be "jacks-of-all-trades," handling various tasks across different museum functions. Additionally these museums frequently employ volunteers to perform key staff functions due to limited financial resources. These museums often struggle when their funding is cut or when costs go up.

== See also ==
- Folk museum
- Historic house museum
- Local history
- National museum
- State Museum
