= Lou Ottens =

Dutch engineer (1926–2021)

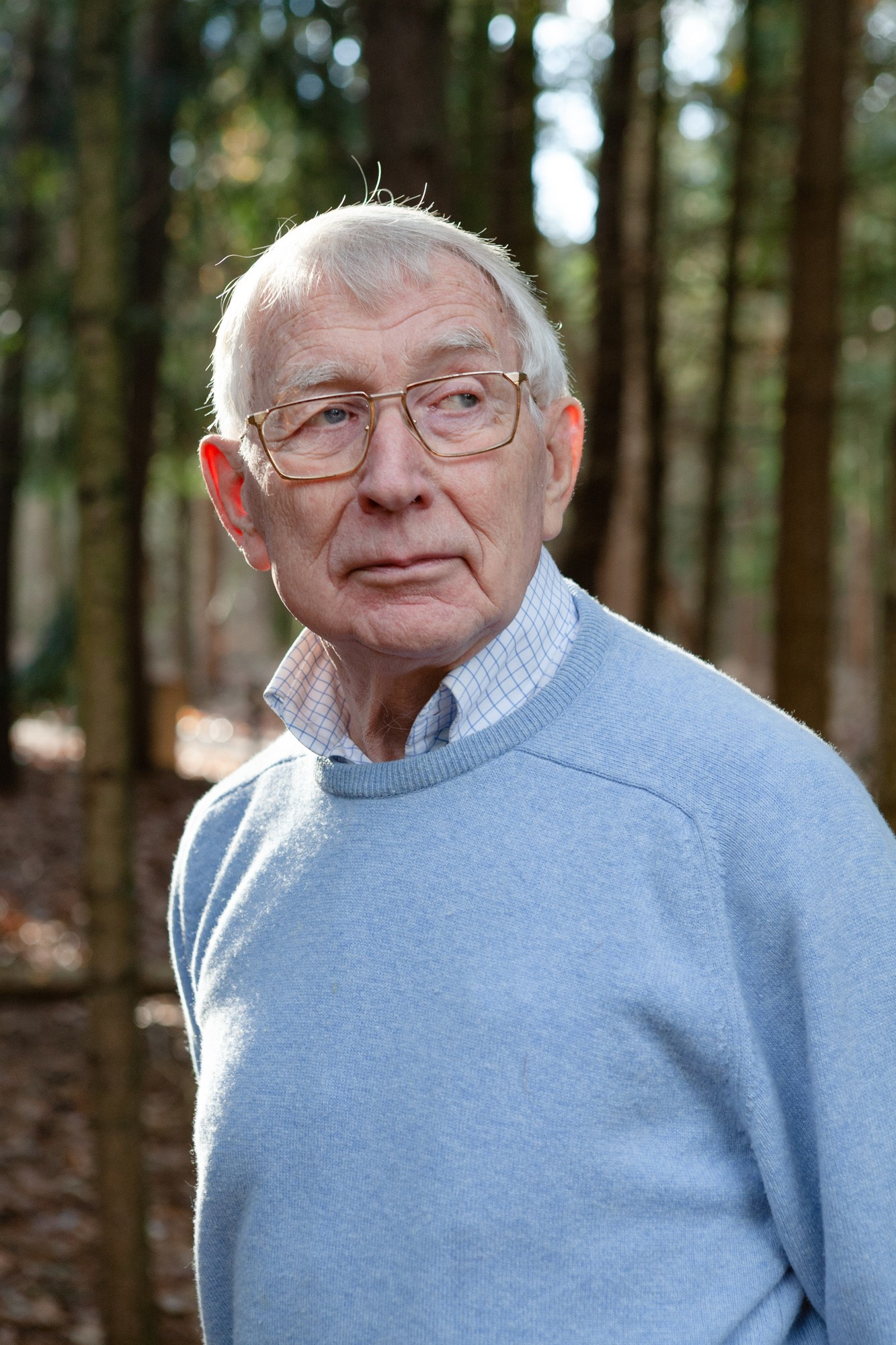
- Ottens in 2007 during an interview for the magazine of the Dutch Royal Institute of Engineers (Nederlands Koninklijk Instituut van Ingenieurs)
- Born: Lodewijk Frederik Ottens; 21 June 1926; Bellingwolde, Netherlands
- Died: 6 March 2021 (aged 94); Duizel, Netherlands
- Occupation: Engineer

Lodewijk Frederik Ottens (21 June 1926 – 6 March 2021), known as Lou Ottens, was a Dutch engineer and inventor, best known as the inventor of the cassette tape, and for his work in helping to develop the compact disc. Ottens was employed by Philips for the entirety of his career.

== Early life ==
Ottens was born in Bellingwolde on 21 June 1926. Ottens showed an interest in technology and tinkering from an early age. While in his teens, during the German occupation of the Netherlands in World War II, he constructed a radio that he would use to secretly listen to Radio Oranje broadcasts. In order to avoid Nazi German jammers, Ottens constructed the radio with a primitive directional antenna. After the war, Ottens began attending the Delft University of Technology, where he studied mechanical engineering. While attending university, Ottens worked part-time as a drafting technician for an X-ray technology factory. He graduated in 1952.

== Career ==
In 1952, Ottens was hired by Philips. He started in the mechanization department of the Main Industry Group in Eindhoven. In 1957, he transferred to a newly opened Philips factory in Hasselt, Belgium. At the time, this factory mainly produced audio equipment, including turntables, tape recorders, and loudspeakers.

=== 1960–1969: Head of Product Development at Philips Hasselt ===
In 1960, Ottens became the head of the new product development department in Hasselt. While in this position, he led the development of Philips' first portable tape recorder, the EL 3585. This project proved to be quite successful, with over 1 million units being sold.

==== Compact cassette ====
Building on the success of the EL 3585, Philips Hasselt started working on plans to develop a portable cassette recorder. The goal for this "pocket recorder," as it was nicknamed, was to be inexpensive and small, with low battery consumption but reasonable sound quality. Originally, Philips planned on working with RCA and using their RCA tape cartridge system cassette, but Ottens found that the dimensions and tape speed of the set made it not suitable for their desired product.

Philips eventually decided to develop their own cassette, with RCA's cassette as a starting point. Ottens started the design of the cassette by cutting a block of wood to fit into his jacket pocket. This wood block would become the model for what became the first portable cassette recorder, the EL 3300.

Ottens managed a team of ten or twelve workers who had experience in designing gramophones and tape recorders to develop the cassette and its equipment. While developing the cassette, the group often utilized resources and knowledge from the nearby Eindhoven location.

In 1963, Philips decided to publicly introduce the cassette system at IFA Berlin. This introduction was not immediately very widely received and did not spark much interest among those in the audio world. However, some photos were taken of the system, which would later be used in the production of Japanese copies of Ottens' system, which were notably larger in size than the original. Wilhelmus F.A. Heylands, a Dutch civil engineer and inventor in Ottens' team at Philips Hasselt, who graduated from TH Aachen (Germany), often explained that the reason for Philips' breakthrough with the Compact Cassette, was that they offered this patent and invention for free to other manufacturers of similar hardware such as National and Sony. Without this, the Compact Cassette would have never become the world standard.

=== 1969–1972: Director of Philips Hasselt ===
In 1969, Ottens became Director of Philips Hasselt. Under his directions, the Hasselt factory would focus primarily on producing Philips cassette systems, with the popularity of general compact cassettes growing. With a growing demand for compact cassettes, Philips Hasselts grew larger, reaching an employee count of over 5000.

=== 1972–1979: Director of Philips Audio ===
In 1972, Ottens became technical director of Philips Main Industry Group Audio. While in this position, Ottens realized that laser technology being researched in the Philips Natuurkundig Laboratorium (NatLab) for video records could also be used to make improvements in the field of audio. With contactless laser readout for audio, the issue of wear and tear that was common with vinyl records and tapes would no longer be a problem. The requirements and implementation of this technology to audio differed greatly from video, and research for this technology was split into two projects: Video Long Play and Audio Long Play.

==== Compact disc ====
The development of the Audio Long Play, or ALP, required major changes in design when compared to the Video Long Play. The VLP, being the size of an LP, had space for 48 hours of music. However, Ottens recognized that this was not a practical amount of playing time, and in 1972, he commissioned technicians to start testing with smaller discs. The technicians originally experimented with 17.8 cm plates, and when those proved successful, reduced the size even further, to 11.5 cm, so that the discs would be compatible with existing car radio systems.

The laser for the ALP also had to be modified from what was used in VLP's, as the VLP laser was too large for the design that Ottens envisioned. Using resources from the NatLab, a new solid state laser was developed that was smaller and more suitable for Ottens design. However, after years of experimentation, Ottens and his team determined that analog technology would cause too much background noise and would not be able to compete with gramophone records. They subsequently decided to start development on new digital technology.

As Philips' audio division did not have adequate in-house knowledge for developing this technology, Ottens formed a seven-person team of technicians with experience in digital technology, two of whom came from the Natlab. In 1977, this team developed the first test model of the digital disc. This prompted enthusiasm from Ottens and led to his formation of a dedicated development lab for the project, which he called the Compact Disc Development lab. A small production facility for test discs was created for the development lab.

The first full model was finalized by March 1979. It was presented by project lead Joop Sinjou at a two-day press conference in Eindhoven to over 300 journalists.

Immediately after the conference, Ottens and Sinjou traveled to Japan, wanting to gain support for the compact disc and make it a world standard. While on the trip, they reached an agreement with Sony, who was ahead of Philips in digital development and optical recording, but had not yet found a way to reduce the size of their device. The companies agreed on joint development and set a universal standard.

=== 1979–1984: Director of Philips Video ===
Upon returning from his trip to Japan, Ottens became technical director of Philips Video Main Industry Group. This division was much larger than the audio division, and was a major player in the TV set business at the time.

==== Video 2000 ====
In his first year in this role, the video division started to develop a replacement for the VCR, called the Video 2000. This was a new video cassette system that they had developed in collaboration with Grundig. Each company released separate versions of this recorder, with Ottens responsible for the Philips version.

Ottens was confronted with many technical problems very early after the release of the product. Within a few months of the products release, a majority of devices were returned to Philips for repair. In addition to this, production costs of the Philips system were moderately high when compared to similar systems.

Under Ottens' direction, a second version of the system was developed with new running gear. This system was more compact and reliable, and had shorter start and stop times. It also featured a smaller footprint, lighter weight, and a SCART port, which had not been implemented in the previous version. Further development efforts were made, and by 1984, the Video 2000 had reliable stereo sound.

Also in 1984, Ottens had his factory produce VHS machines that were practically identical to the Video 2000. These machines would end up replacing the Video 2000, which ultimately failed to catch on and was officially cancelled in 1985.

== Later years ==
After retiring, Ottens remained active in the field of technology for many years. He became chairman of the Dutch Association for Logistics Management in 1988. Ottens was among the interviewees in director Zack Taylor's 2016 documentary film, Cassette: A Documentary Mixtape, and appeared at the East End Film Festival world premiere screening in London on June 24, 2016. Ottens died in Duizel on 6 March 2021, aged 94.
