= Lodewijk Bruckman =

Dutch painter

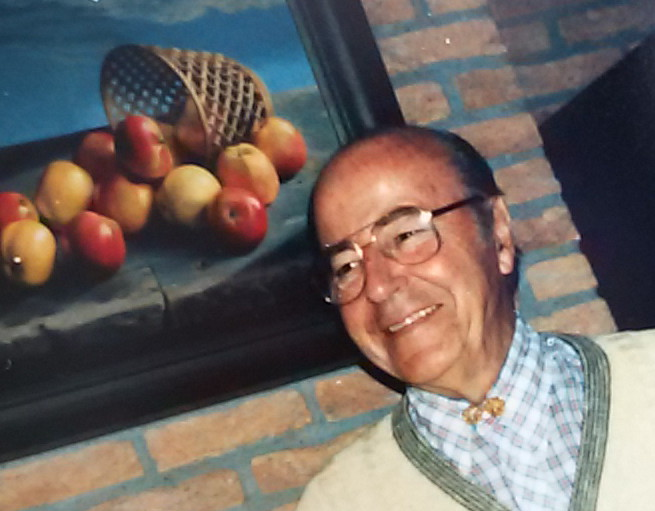
- Lodewijk Bruckman in 1983
- Born: Lodewijk Karel Bruckman; 14 August 1903; The Hague, Netherlands
- Died: 24 April 1995 (aged 91); Leeuwarden, Netherlands
- Education: Royal Academy of Art
- Known for: Painting
- Movement: Magic realism

Lodewijk Karel "Loki" Bruckman (Dutch pronunciation: [ˈloːdəʋɛik ˈkaːrəl ˈloːki ˈbrʏkmɑn]; 14 August 1903 – 24 April 1995) was a Dutch magic realist painter. He lived and worked in the Netherlands, the United States, and Mexico. Museum de Oude Wolden in the village of Bellingwolde has a permanent exhibition of his paintings.

== Biography ==
Lodewijk Karel Bruckman was born on 14 August 1903 in The Hague in the Netherlands. He was the son of house painter Karel Lodewijk Bruckman (1868–1952) and Wilhelmina Frederika Hamel (1869–1930). He had two sisters and two brothers, one of whom was his twin brother Karel Lodewijk Bruckman (1903–1982).

Bruckman studied with his twin brother at the Royal Academy of Art in The Hague, where he was a student of Henk Meijer. He worked first as a set painter, later as a drawing teacher, and eventually as a fine artist.

In 1949, Bruckman and his life partner Evert Zeeven, who was also his manager, moved to the United States. They lived in New York City and Provincetown in the U.S. and also in Morelia in Mexico. Bruckman had several gallery exhibitions in New York.

In 1968, they returned to the Netherlands, where they lived in Wemeldinge, Haarlem, and Bellingwedde. Bruckman stopped oil painting in 1986, but continued with pencil drawing. In 1989, they moved to Leeuwarden. Zeeven died on 30 November 1993. One and a half year later, Bruckman died on 24 April 1995 in Leeuwarden, at the age of 91.

== Painting ==
Painting by Bruckman in the permanent exhibition of his work in Museum de Oude Wolden in Bellingwolde, the Netherlands

Bruckman painted figuratively, forest views, and other still lifes with fruit, flowers, shells, eggs, feathers and towels. His style can be described as realistic, surrealistic or magic realistic. In 1958, Frank Crotty described Bruckman's painting with the following words:

His paintings are both realistic and surrealistic. His technique is reminiscent of Salvatore Dali's. All objects are painted with exceptional exactitude and have an additional faculty which is often described as three-dimensional. His feathers, for example – and he paints many of them – are so realistic that you feel a gust of wind would blow them away. They are the trick-of-eye kind of painting called 'trompe l'oeil'.

Bruckman gained popularity in the United States, while he remained relatively unknown in the Netherlands. His painting Composition With Peaches won the popular vote at the Boston Arts Festival in 1953 and he became second in 1957. He won the J. Porter Brinton Prize in 1954. The Metropolitan Museum of Art in New York City has a still life called Mobile (1955) by Bruckman in its collection and the Cape Cod Museum of Art in Dennis a painting named Rancho Style (1960).

In the 1980s, Bruckman donated fifteen paintings to the municipality of Goes and 21 paintings, with an estimated value of 363,000 euro, to the municipality of Bellingwedde. Museum de Oude Wolden in Bellingwolde in the Netherlands has a permanent exhibition with his paintings from the municipal collection of Bellingwedde.
