= Rhederbrug =

- Hamlet
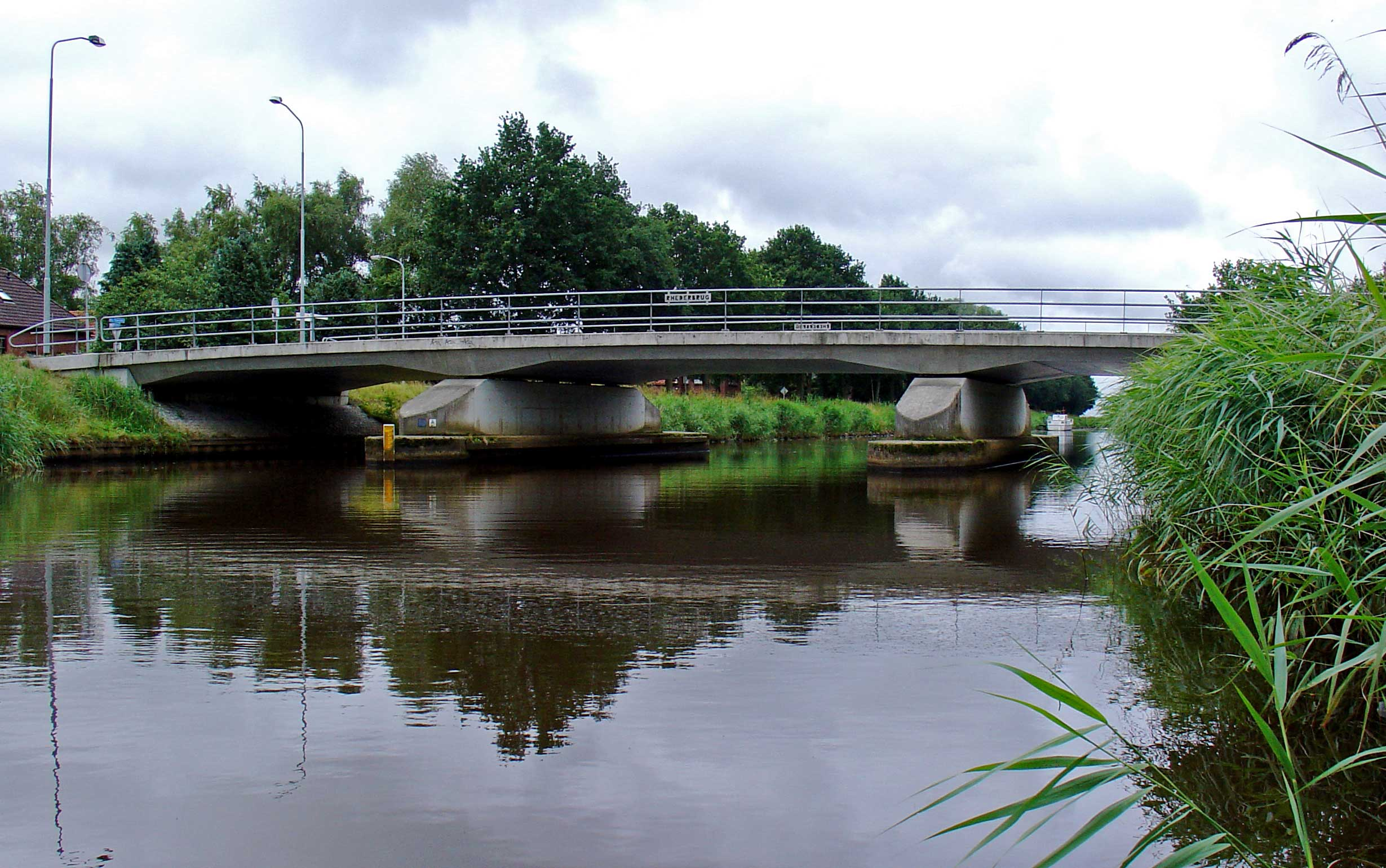
- Rheder Bridge in 2008

- Location of Rhederbrug in the province of Groningen Rhederbrug (Netherlands)
- Coordinates: 53°5′20″N 7°10′5″E
- Country: Netherlands
- Province: Groningen
- Municipality: Westerwolde
- Village: Bellingwolde

Area
  - Total: 7.33 km^{2} (2.83 sq mi)
- Elevation: 0.8 m (2.6 ft)

Population (2021)
  - Total: 240
  - Density: 33/km^{2} (85/sq mi)
- Time zone: UTC+1 (CET)
  - Summer (DST): UTC+2 (CEST)
- Postal code: 9695
- Dialing code: 0597

Rhederbrug (Dutch pronunciation: [ˌreːdərˈbrʏx]; English: Rhede's Bridge) is a hamlet near Bellingwolde in the municipality of Westerwolde in the Netherlands. The hamlet has a population of 240.

The hamlet was first mentioned in 1983 as Rhederbrug, and means bridge to Rhede in Germany. The bridge was built around 1917. Rhederbrug is considered part of Bellingwolde.
