= Veldkamps Meuln =

Windmill

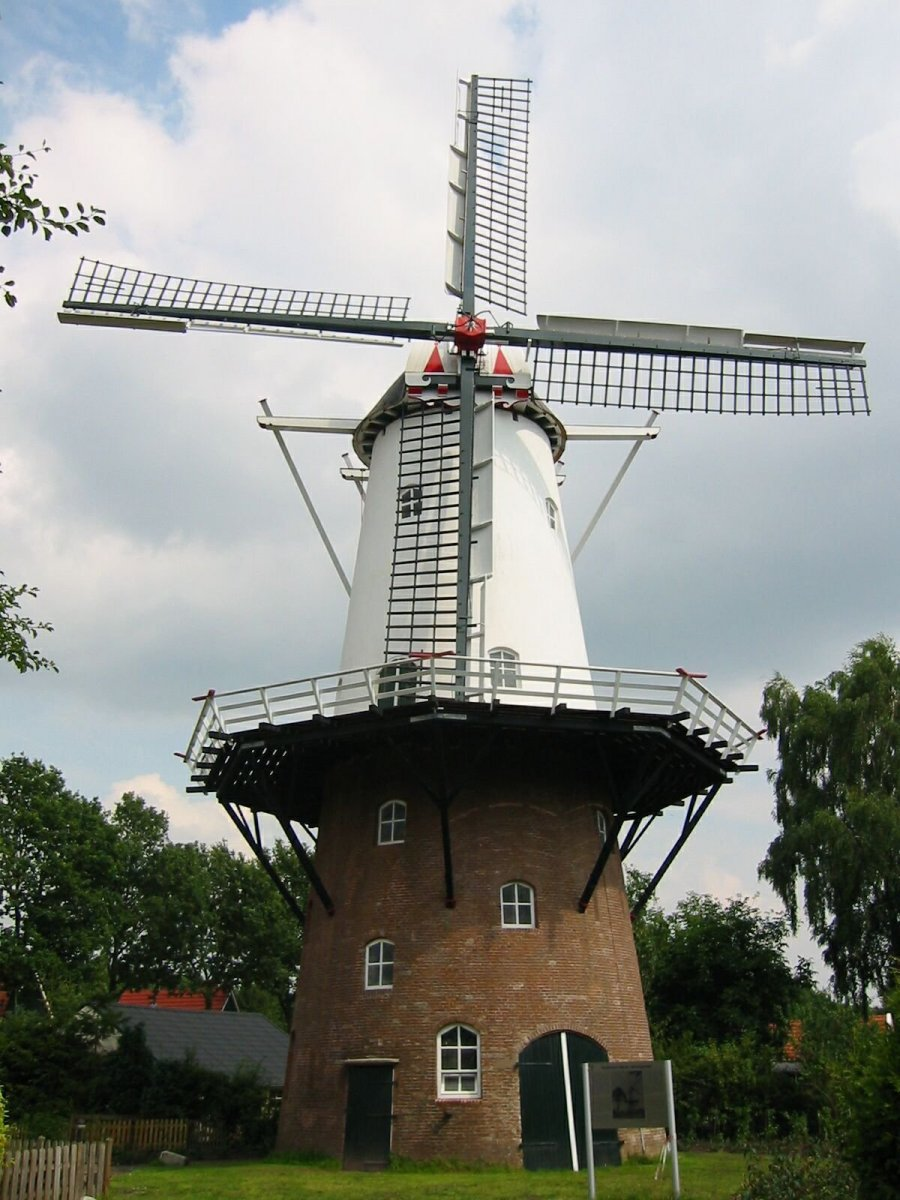
- The windmill in 2002
- Interactive map of Veldkamps Meuln

Origin
- Mill name: Veldkamps Meuln (English: Veldkamp's Mill)
- Mill location: Hoofdweg 314; Bellingwolde, Netherlands
- Coordinates: 53.1258°N 7.1716°E
- Year built: 1855

Information
- Purpose: Oil mill, grist mill
- Type: Stellingmolen
- Storeys: Seven storeys
- No. of sails: Four
- Type of sails: Common sails, Fauël system on leading edges
- Windshaft: Cast iron
- Winding: Tailpole and winch
- Auxiliary power: Diesel engine, later electric motor
- No. of pairs of millstones: Two pairs

Veldkamps Meuln (Dutch pronunciation: [ˈvɛltkɑmps møːln]; English: Veldkamp's Mill) is a 19th-century tower mill in the village of Bellingwolde in the Netherlands.

== Location ==
Veldkamps Meuln is located at the Hoofdweg in the village of Bellingwolde in the east of the province of Groningen in the northeast of the Netherlands.

== History ==
Veldkamps Meuln was built as a grist and oil mill by the Veldkamp family in 1855. The mill was heavily damaged by a storm in 1895. It has been a national heritage site since 1972. The mill was again heavily damaged by storms in 1972 and 1976. The windmill was restored in 2002–2003.

== Description ==
Veldkamps Meuln is a seven storey tower mill with a stage at third floor level (Dutch: stellingmolen). The cap is covered with dakleer. Four common sails with a span of 20.20 metres (66 ft 3 in) are carried on a cast iron windshaft. The sails are winded by a tailpole and winch. The windshaft carries a brake wheel which has 59 teeth. This drives a wallower with 30 teeth. The wallower is at the top of the upright shaft, which has a great spur wheel at its bottom. This has 86 teeth. It drives two stone nuts, which drive the millstones. The stone nuts have 24 and 26 staves respectively. The millstones are driven overdrift.
