= De Korenbloem, Vriescheloo =

Smock mill in Vriescheloo, Netherlands

De Korenbloem
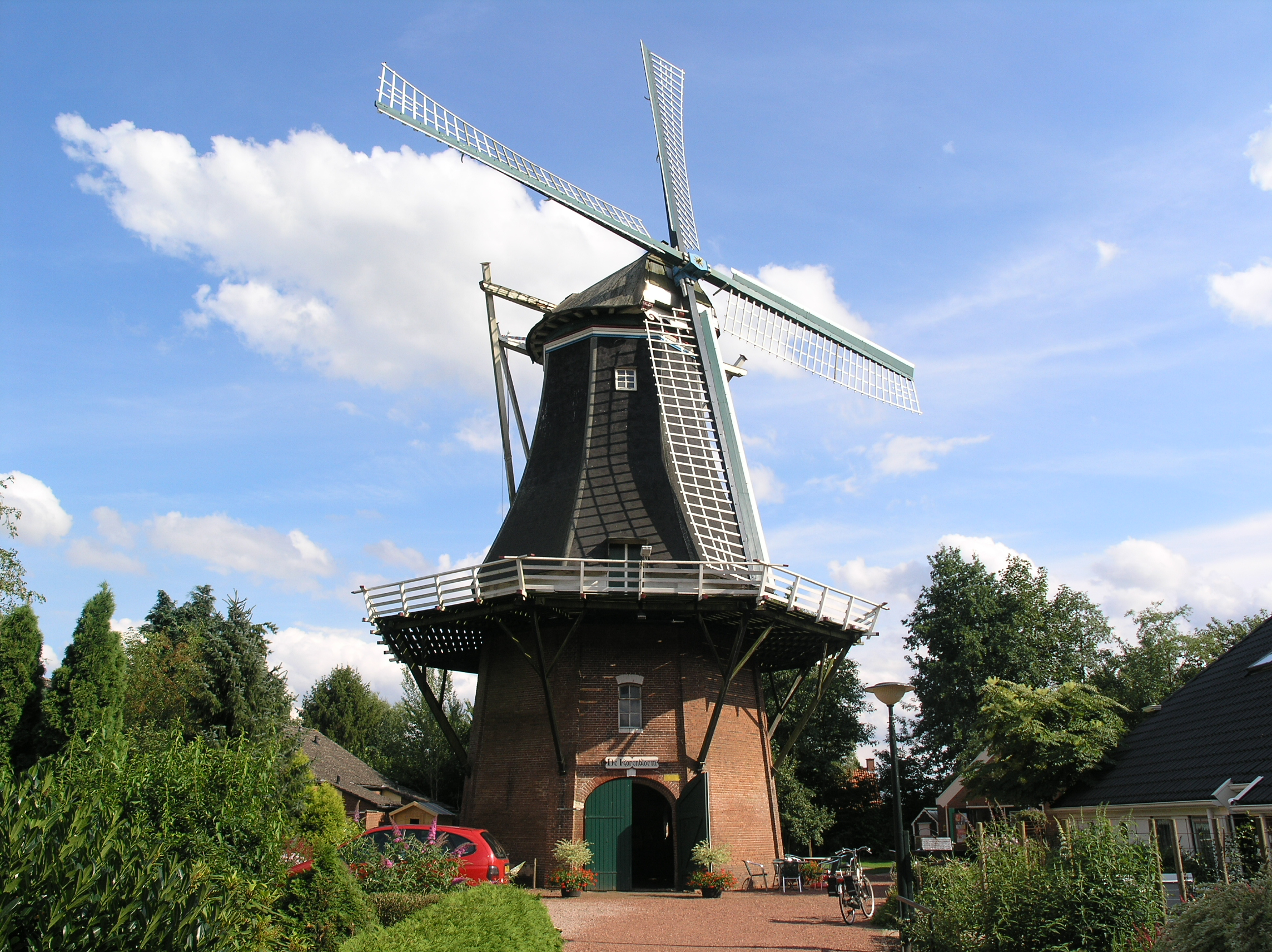
- De Korenbloem in 2008

Origin
- Mill name: De Korenbloem (English: The Cornflower)
- Mill location: Wedderweg 25A; Vriescheloo, Netherlands
- Coordinates: 53°4′5″N 7°6′44″E
- Year built: 1895

Information
- Purpose: Grist mill
- Type: Smock mill

De Korenbloem (Dutch pronunciation: [də ˈkoːrə(m)ˌblum]; English: The Cornflower) is a 19th-century smock mill in the village of Vriescheloo in the Netherlands.

== Location ==
De Korenbloem is located at the Wedderweg in the village of Vriescheloo in the east of the province of Groningen in the northeast of the Netherlands.

== History ==
De Korenbloem was built as a grist mill in 1895. An electric motor was installed in 1947. It has been a national heritage site since 1972. The windmill was restored in 1973.
