= Klein-Ulsda =

- Hamlet
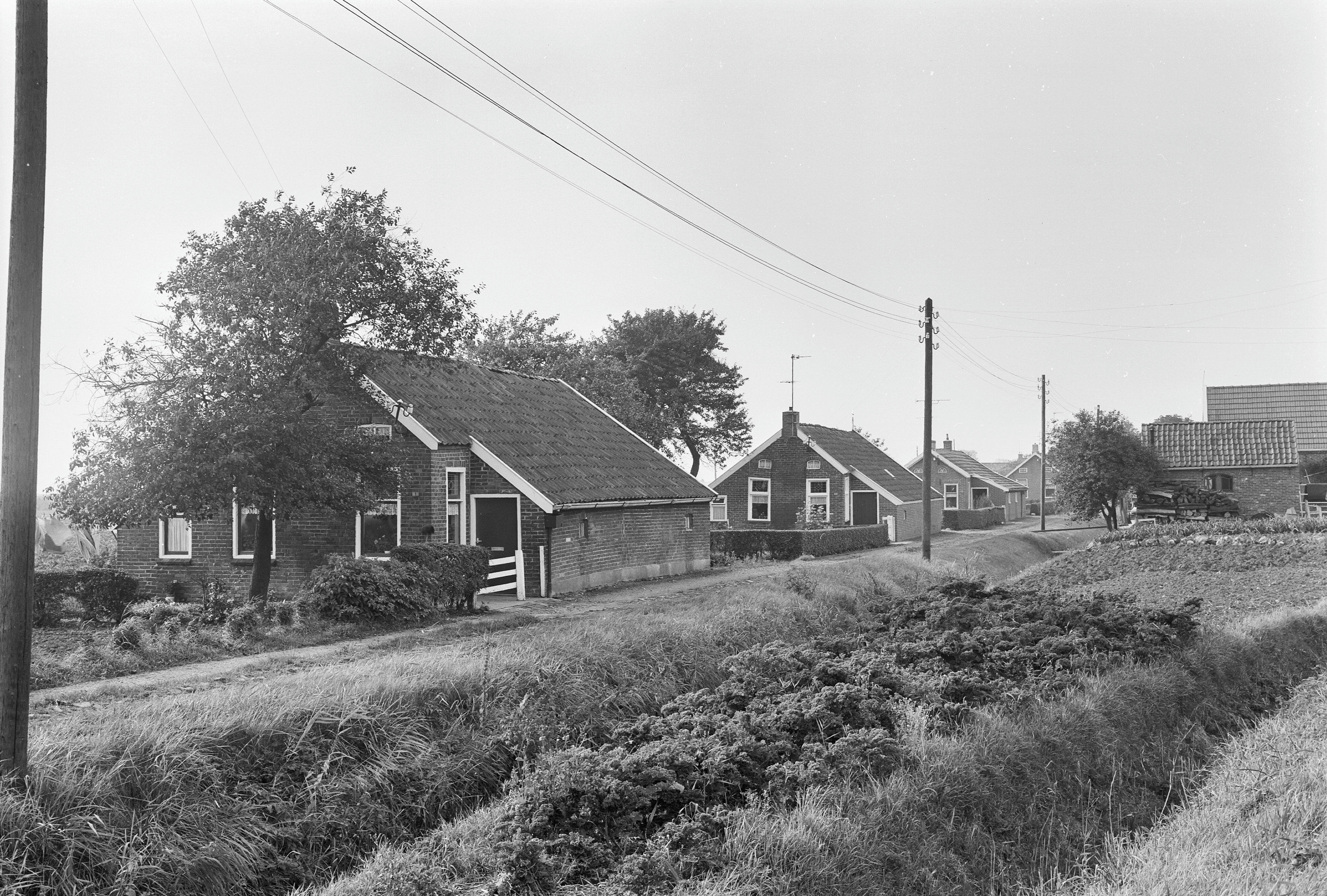
- Klein-Ulsda in 1967

- Location of Klein-Ulsda in the province of Groningen Klein-Ulsda (Netherlands)
- Coordinates: 53°9′20″N 7°8′45″E
- Country: Netherlands
- Province: Groningen
- Municipality: Westerwolde
- Village: Oudeschans

Area
  - Total: 0.25 km^{2} (0.097 sq mi)
- Elevation: 0.4 m (1.3 ft)

Population (2021)
  - Total: 50
  - Density: 200/km^{2} (520/sq mi)
- Time zone: UTC+1 (CET)
  - Summer (DST): UTC+2 (CEST)
- Postal code: 9696
- Dialing code: 0597

Klein-Ulsda (Dutch pronunciation: [klɛin ˈʏlzdaː]; English: Small Ulsda) is a hamlet near Oudeschans in the municipality of Westerwolde in the Netherlands.

The hamlet was first mentioned between 1851 and 1855 Kl. Ulsda, and means little Ulsda after the nearby village. It was sometimes refer to as Hutte(n), because of the tiny houses. The postal authorities have placed it under Oudeschans. Klein-Ulsda has place name signs. It was home to 64 people in 1840.

== Gallery ==
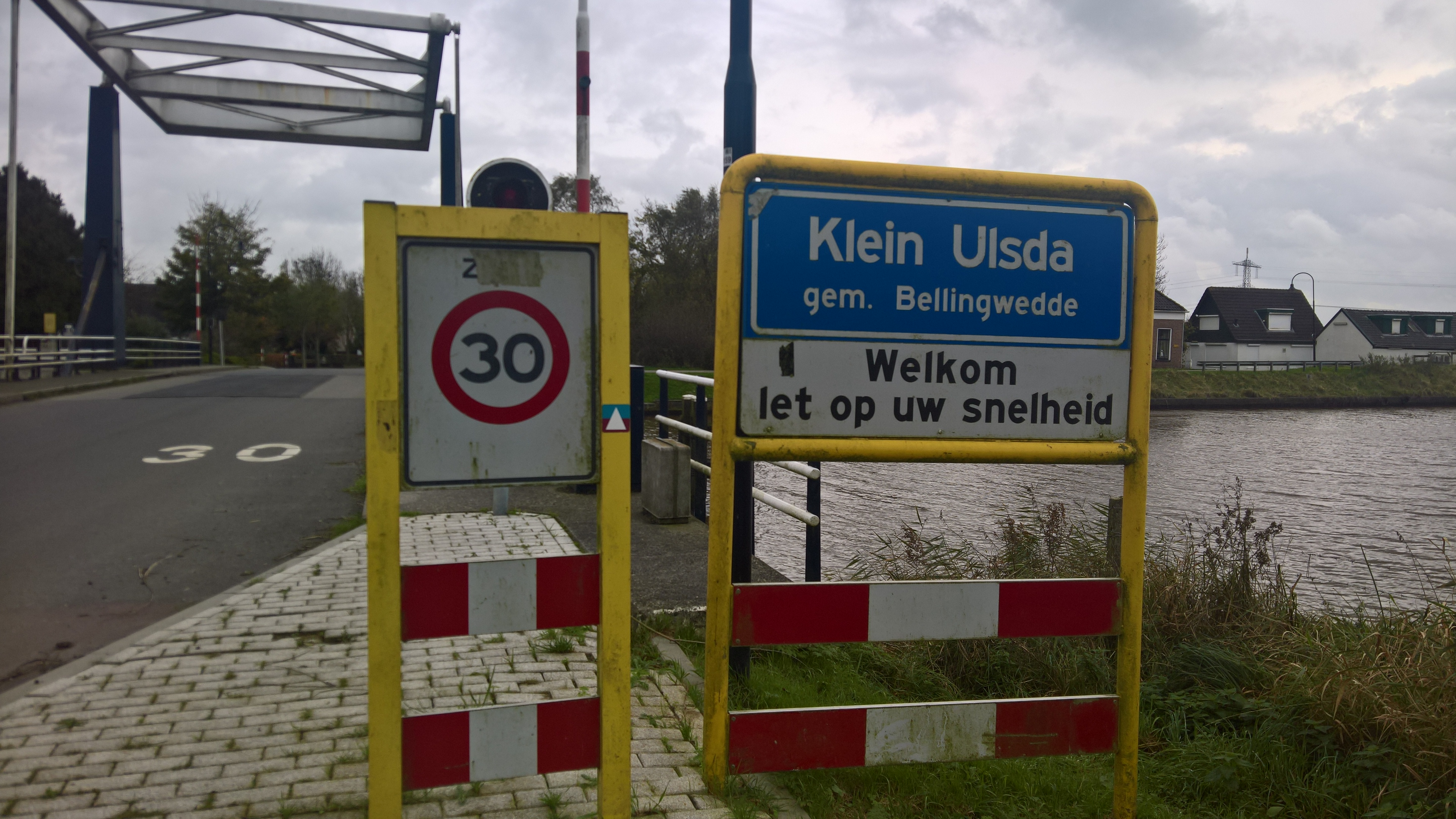
Place name sign

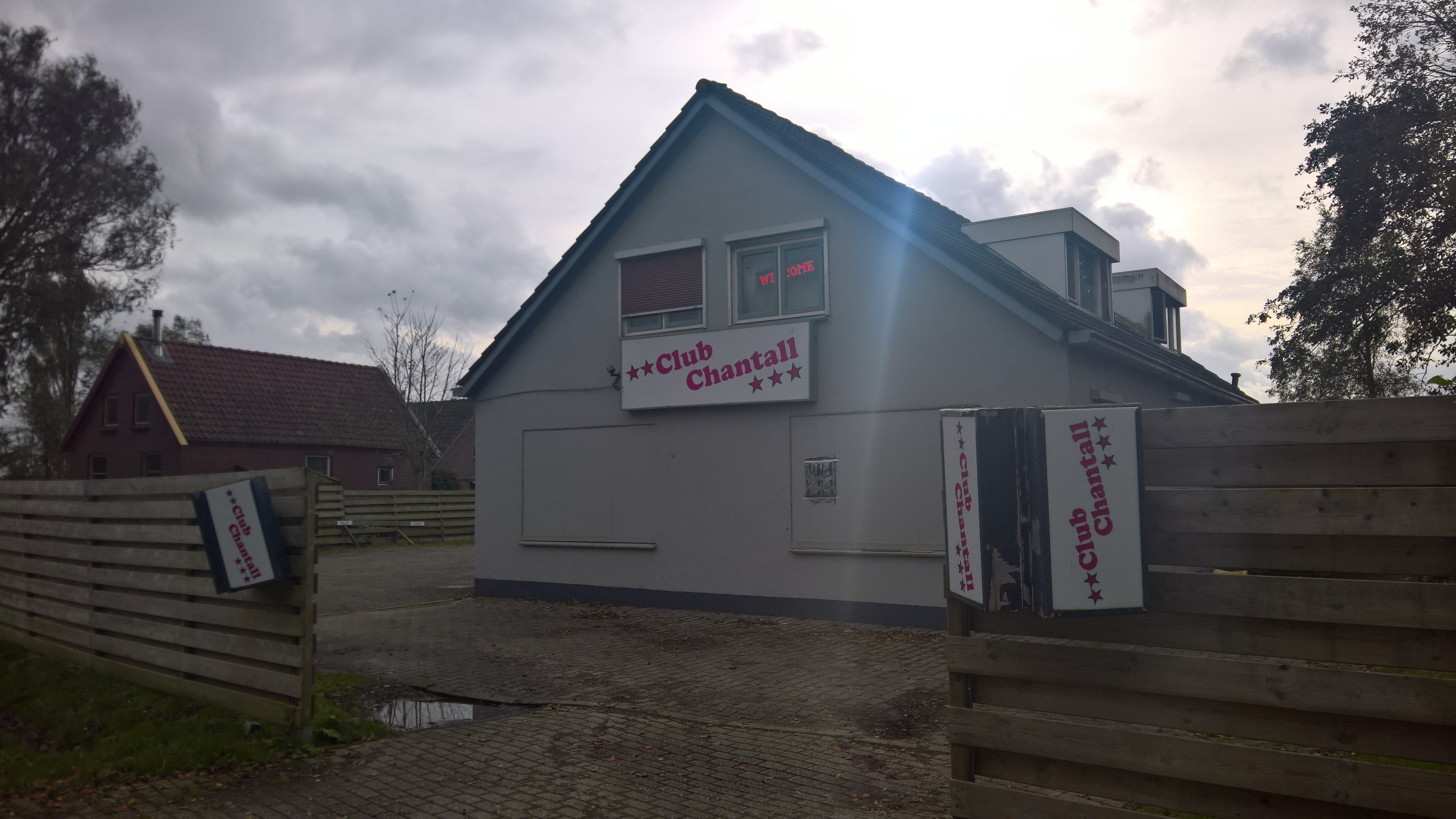
Club Chantall (brothel)
