= State Museum =

State Museum may refer to:

== Austria ==
- Tyrolean State Museum

== Azerbaijan ==
- Azerbaijan State Museum of Musical Culture

== Germany ==
- Berlin State Museums
- Lower Saxony State Museum
- Pomeranian State Museum
- State Museum of Natural History, Karlsruhe
- State Museum of Natural History, Stuttgart
- State Museum of Zoology, Dresden
- Westphalian State Museum of Art and Cultural History

== Greece ==
- State Museum of Contemporary Art

== India ==
- Assam State Museum
- Himachal State Museum
- Manipur State Museum
- Mizoram State Museum
- Nagaland State Museum
- Odisha State Museum
- State Museum, Bhopal
- State Museum, Lucknow
- State Museum, Ranchi
- Telangana State Archaeology Museum
- Ujjayanta Palace
- Uttara Museum of Contemporary Art

== Kazakhstan ==
- Central State Museum of Kazakhstan

== Malaysia ==
- Penang State Museum and Art Gallery
- Perak State Museum
- Sarawak State Museum

== Russia ==
- Pushkin Museum
- Tsiolkovsky State Museum of the History of Cosmonautics

== United States ==
- Alaska State Museum
- Arizona State Museum
- Bullock Texas State History Museum
- Connecticut State Museum of Natural History
- Illinois State Museum
- Indiana State Museum
- Louisiana State Museum
- Maine State Museum
- Minnesota History Center Museum
- New Jersey State Museum
- Nevada State Museum, Carson City
- Nevada State Museum, Las Vegas
- New York State Museum
- Pembina State Museum
- Pensacola Museum of History, formerly the T. T. Wentworth, Jr. Florida State Museum
- State Museum of Pennsylvania
- Tennessee State Museum
- University of Nebraska State Museum
- Wyoming State Museum
