= Magnuskerk =

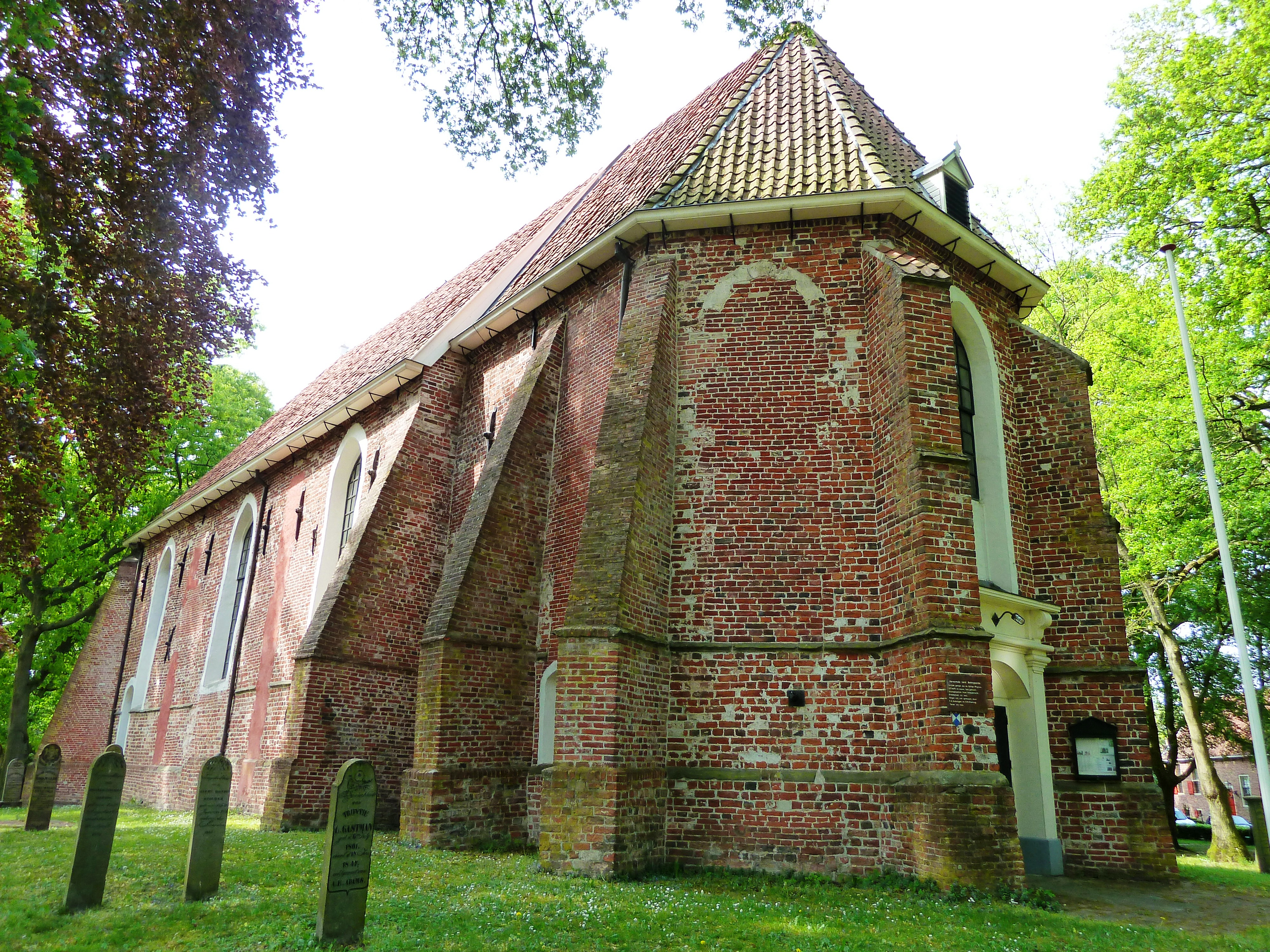
- Magnuskerk in 2011

- Location in the province of Groningen in the Netherlands
- 53°7′13″N 7°9′59″E
- Location: Hoofdweg 227, Bellingwolde
- Country: Netherlands
- Denomination: Protestant
- Previous denomination: Roman Catholic

Architecture
- Heritage designation: Rijksmonument (1972)
- Architectural type: Church
- Style: Gothic
- Completed: 1527

The Magnuskerk (Dutch pronunciation: [ˈmɑxnʏsˌkɛr(ə)k]; English: Magnus Church) is a 16th-century church in Bellingwolde, Netherlands. The church, located at Hoofdweg 227, was built in 1527. The pulpit was installed in 1660 and the organ built in 1797. The church has been a national heritage site since 1972. It is currently used by the Protestant Church in the Netherlands.

== Gallery ==
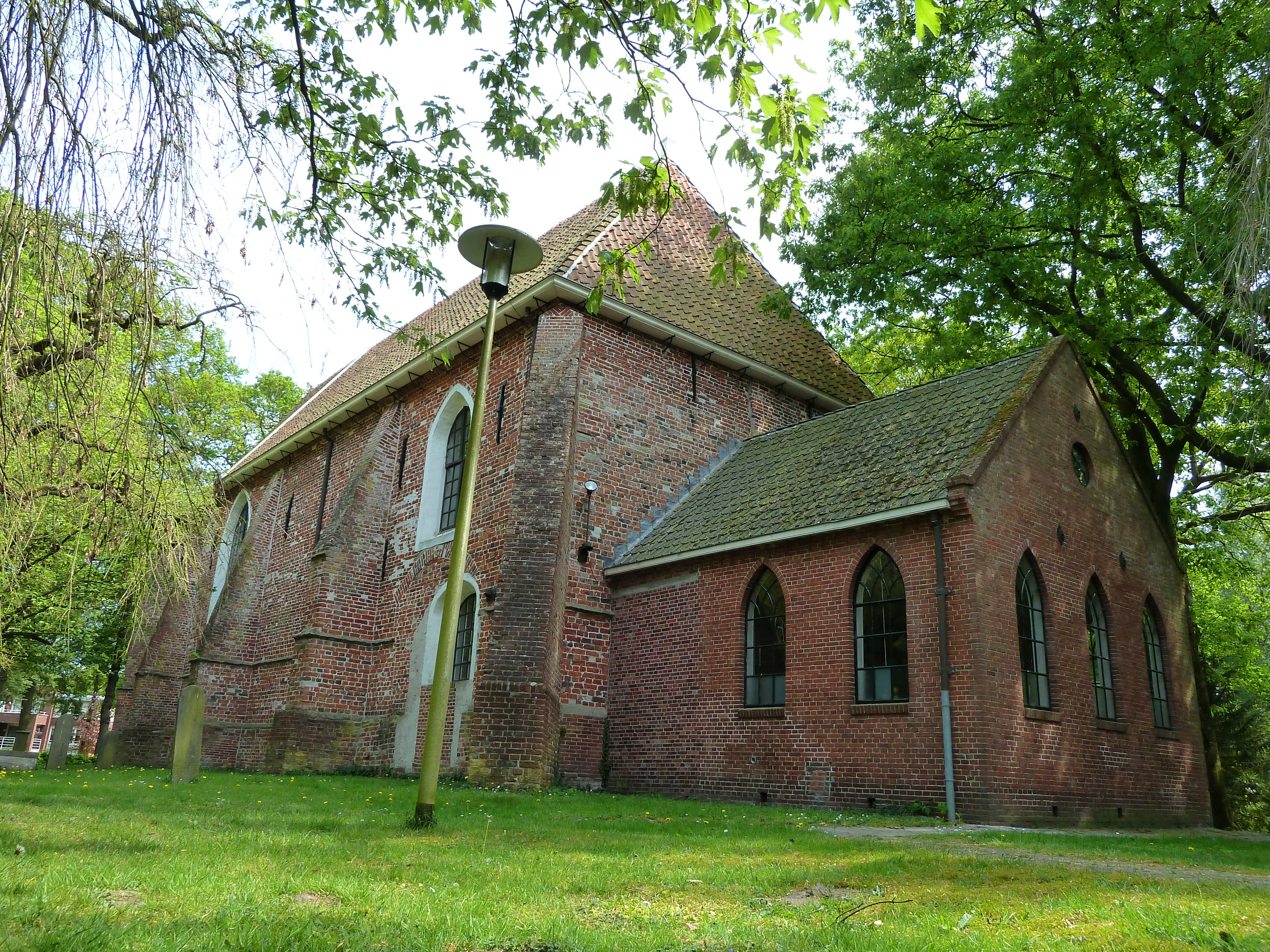
Rear view in 2011

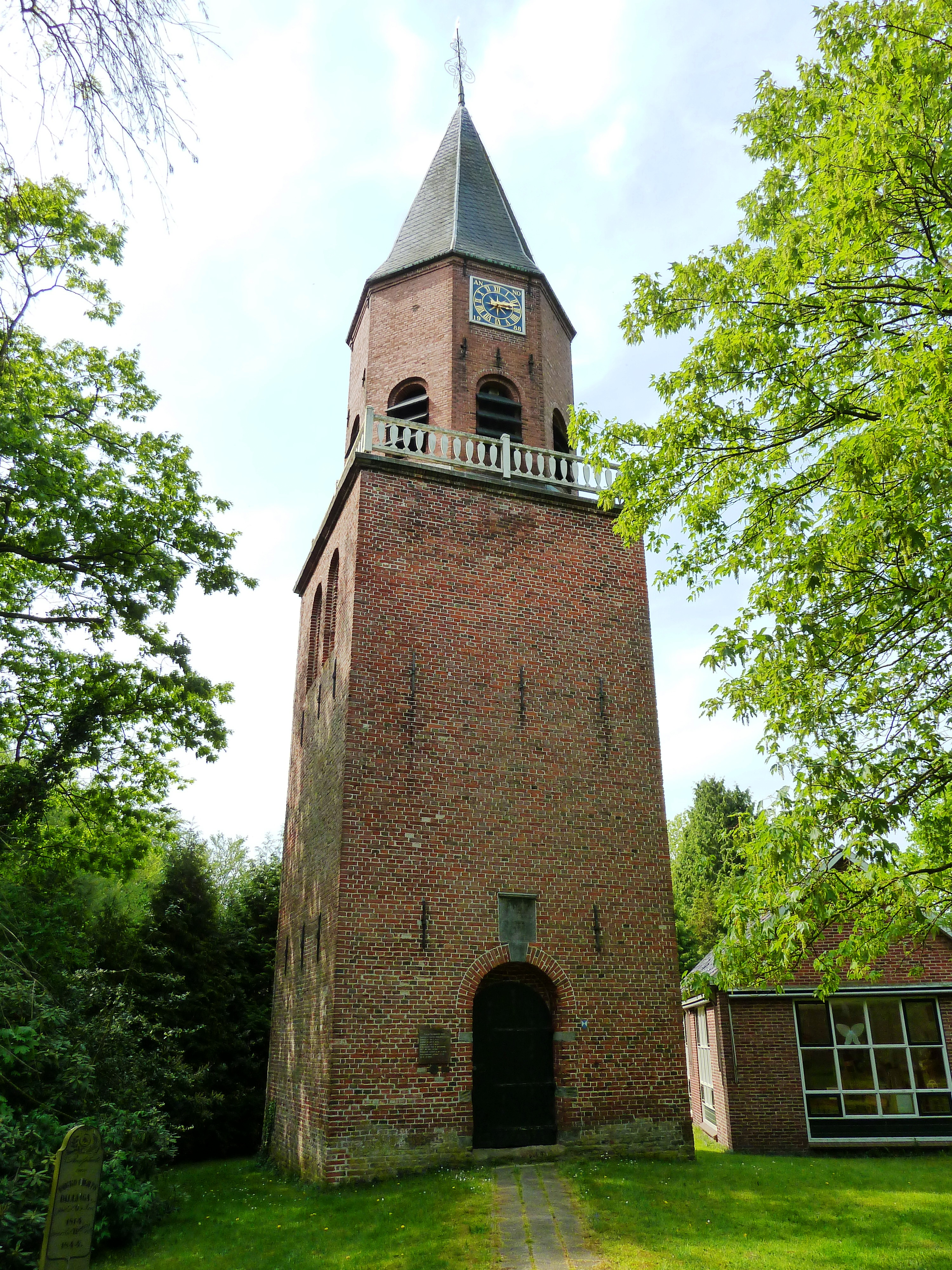
Bell tower in 2011

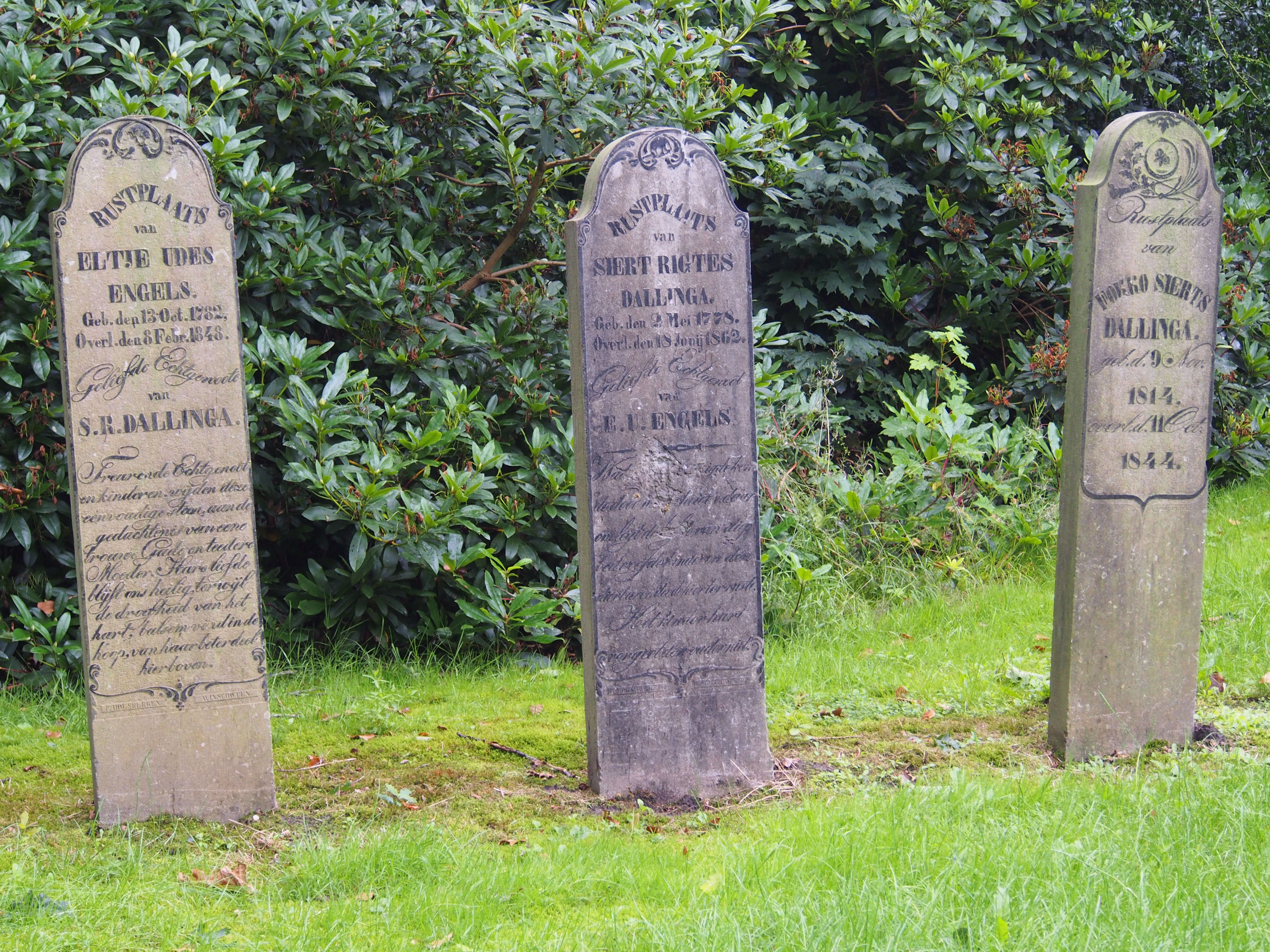
Graves near the bell tower in 2015

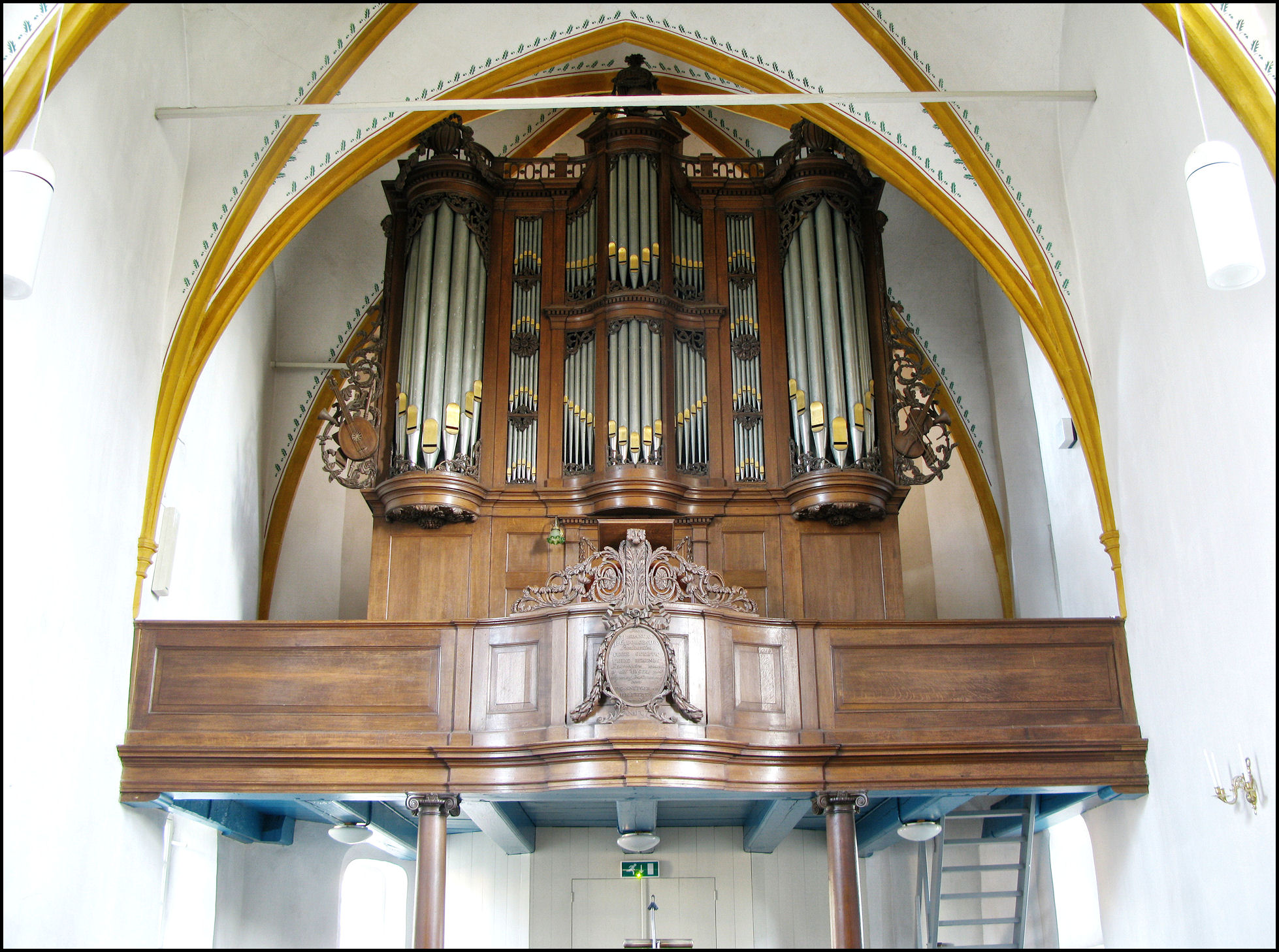
Organ in 2008
