= Wymeer =

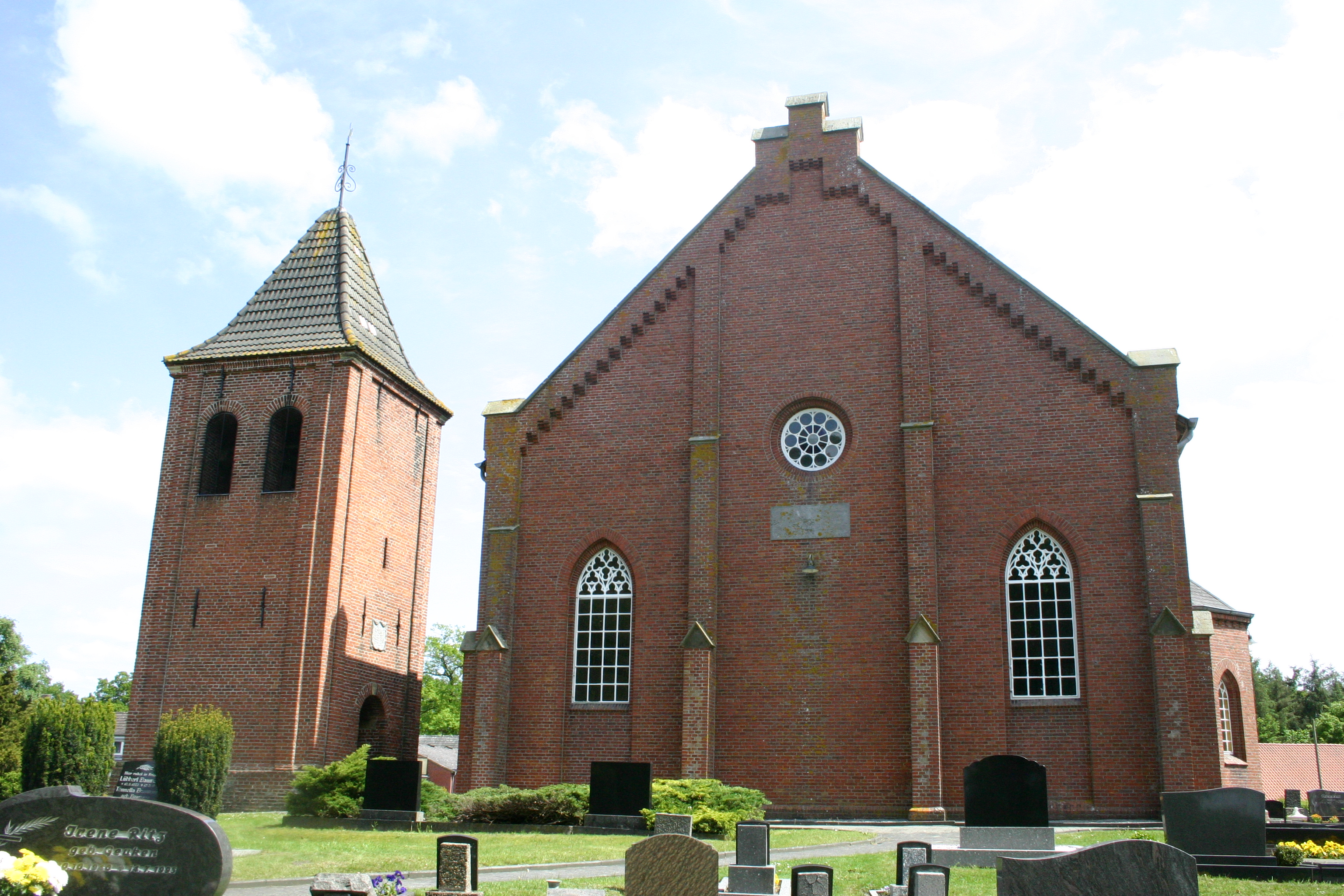
- reformed church in 2009

- Location in the state of Lower Saxony in Germany
- Coordinates: 53°08′N 07°14′E
- Country: Germany
- State: Lower Saxony
- District: Leer
- Municipality: Bunde

Wymeer is a village in the municipality of Bunde in the district of Leer in Lower Saxony, Germany.
