= Westerwolde (region) =

- Region
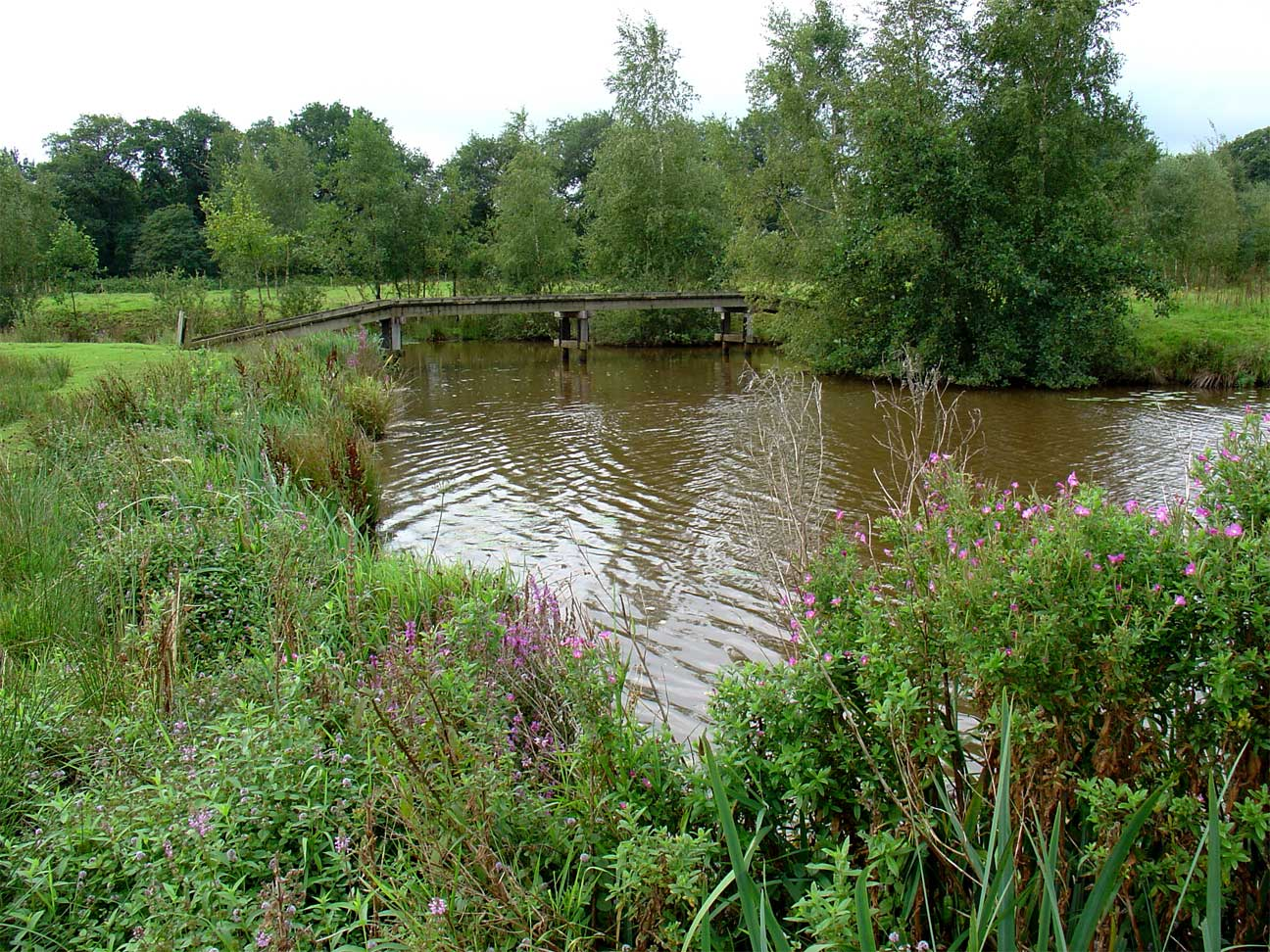
- The river Ruiten Aa

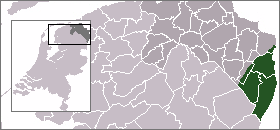
- Location of Westerwolde (green) in Groningen (dark grey) in the Netherlands (light grey)
- Coordinates: 53°1′N 7°6′E
- Country: Netherlands
- Province: Groningen
- Time zone: UTC+1 (CET)
  - Summer (DST): UTC+2 (CEST)

Westerwolde (Dutch pronunciation: [ˌʋɛstərˈʋɔldə]) is a region in the province Groningen in the north of the Netherlands. The region is located in the most eastern part of the Netherlands, alongside the German border. It is situated around the rivers Mussel Aa, Ruiten Aa, and Westerwoldse Aa, and it contains the villages Bellingwolde, Blijham, Onstwedde, Sellingen, Ter Apel, Vlagtwedde, Vriescheloo, and Wedde. The people in Westerwolde speak Dutch and the West Low German dialect Westerwolds.

Historically, the region is one of the Ommelanden, which are the regions around the city of Groningen.
