= Vriescheloo =

- Village
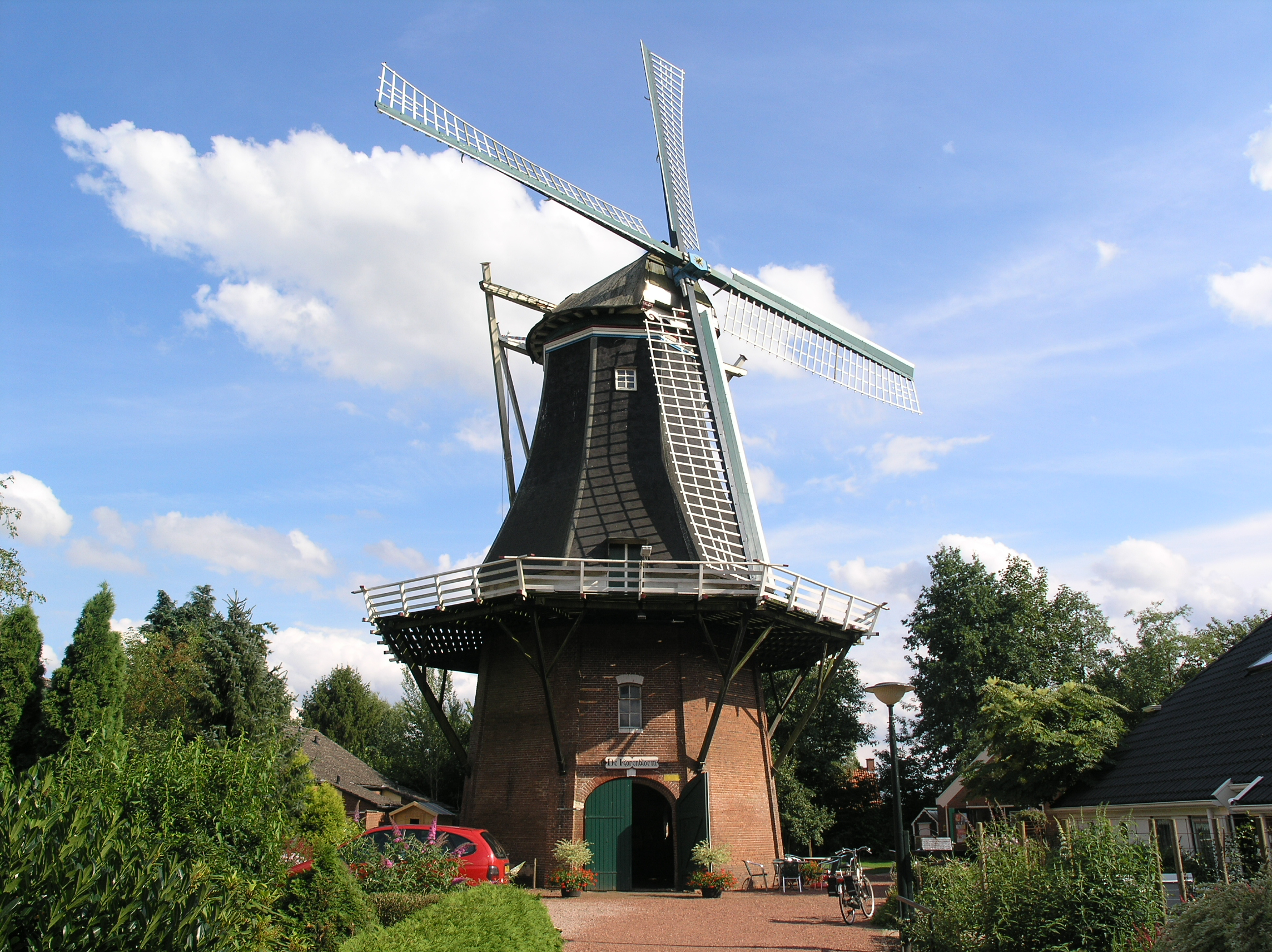
- Smock mill De Korenbloem in 2008

- Location of Vriescheloo in the province of Groningen Vriescheloo (Netherlands)
- Coordinates: 53°4′5″N 7°6′50″E
- Country: Netherlands
- Province: Groningen
- Municipality: Westerwolde

Area (2012)
  - Total: 213 ha (530 acres)
  - Land: 212 ha (520 acres)
  - Water: 1 ha (2.5 acres)

Population (2021)
  - Total: 700
  - Density: 330/km^{2} (860/sq mi)
- Postcode: 9599
- Area code: 0597

Vriescheloo (Dutch: [ˌvrisxəˈloː]; Gronings: Vraiskeloo [ˌvrɑɪskəˈloː]) is a village in the municipality of Westerwolde in the Netherlands.

== History ==
Vriescheloo is a linear settlement on the sand ridge which formed the old road between Groningen and Germany. The village dates from the 11th or 12th century. Its first inhabitants were mainly peat harvesters, and it developed into an agricultural community.

The 19th century smock mill De Korenbloem is located in the village.

== Gallery ==
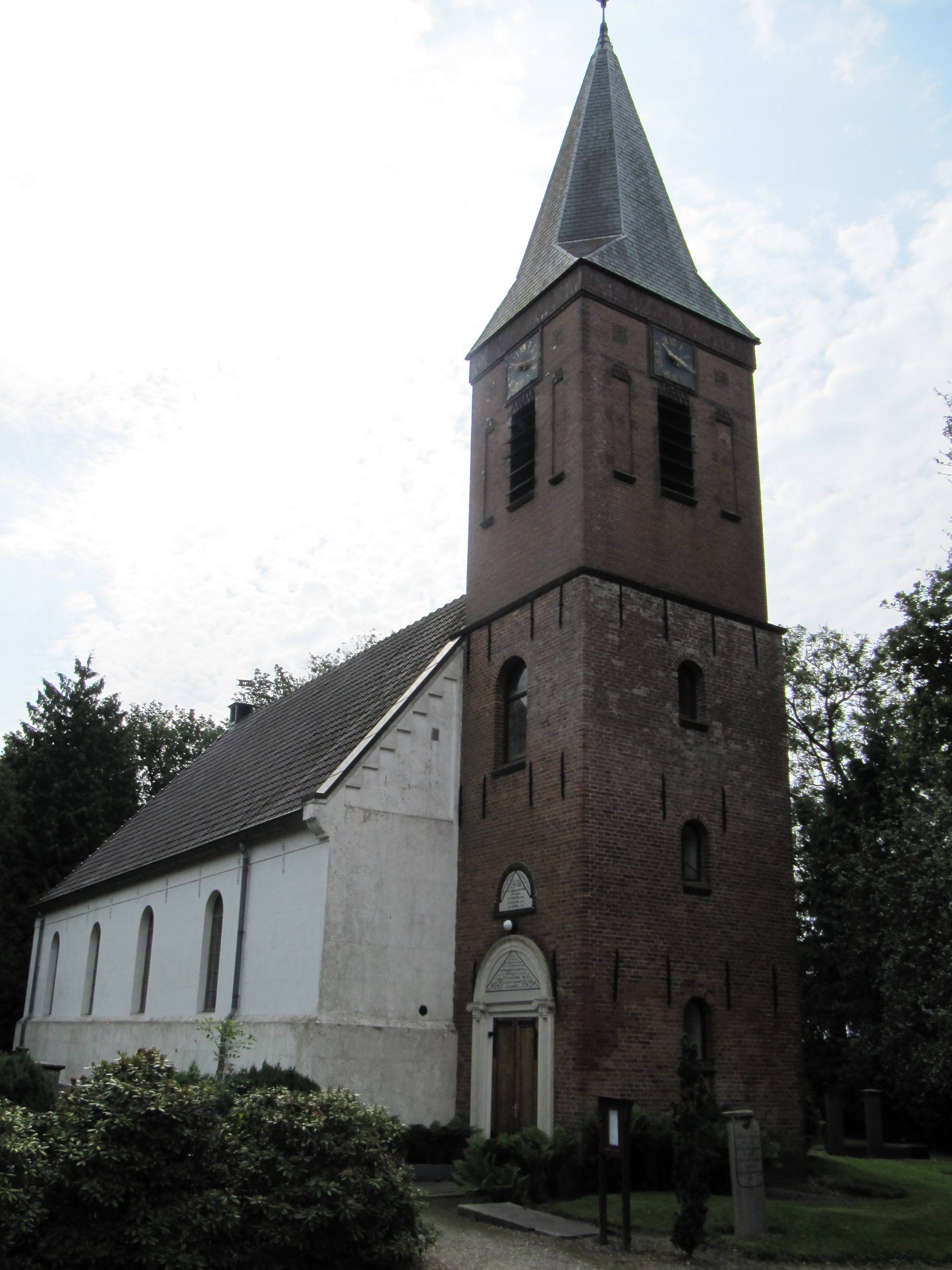
Church in c. 2011

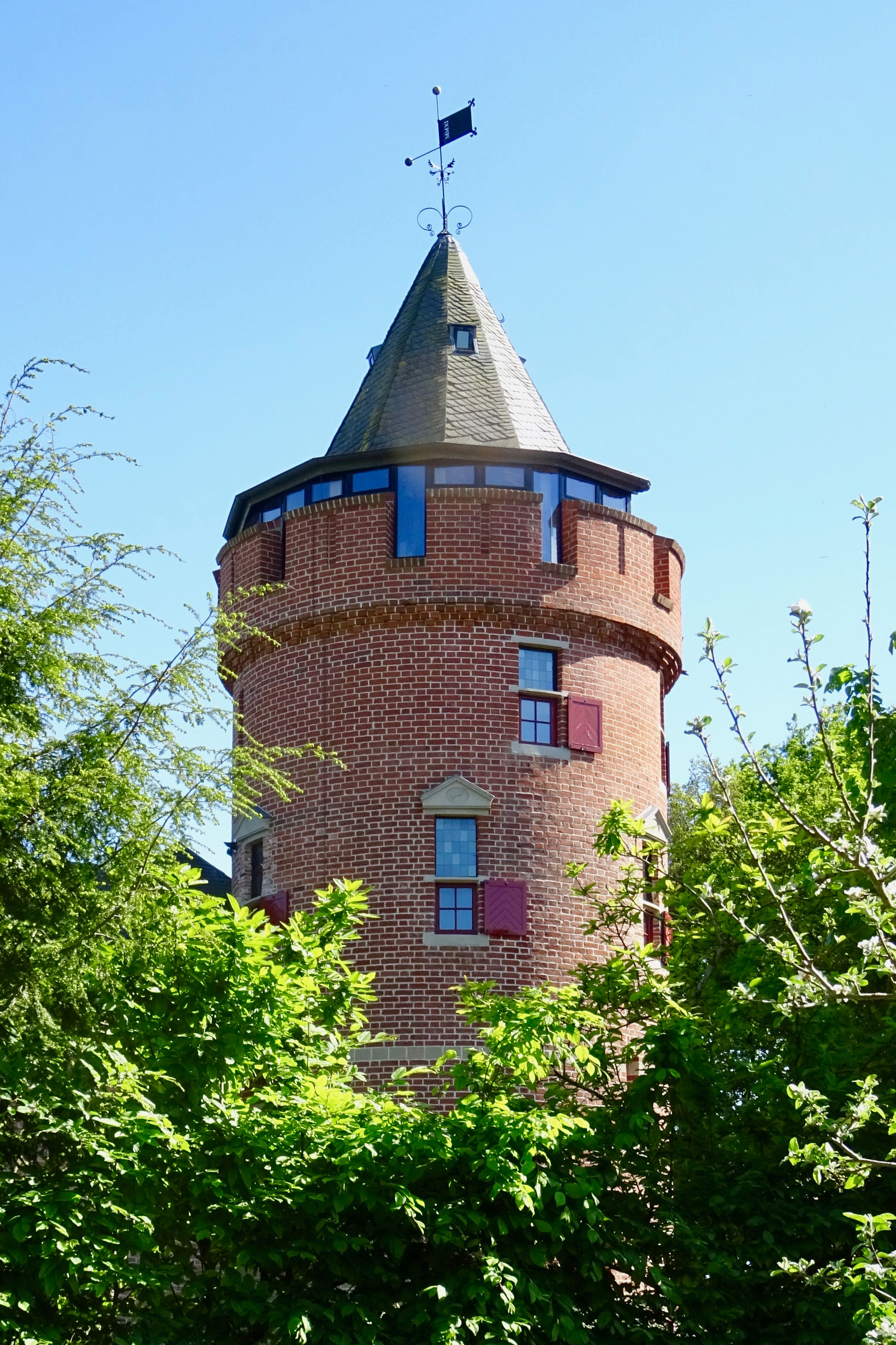
Modern castle

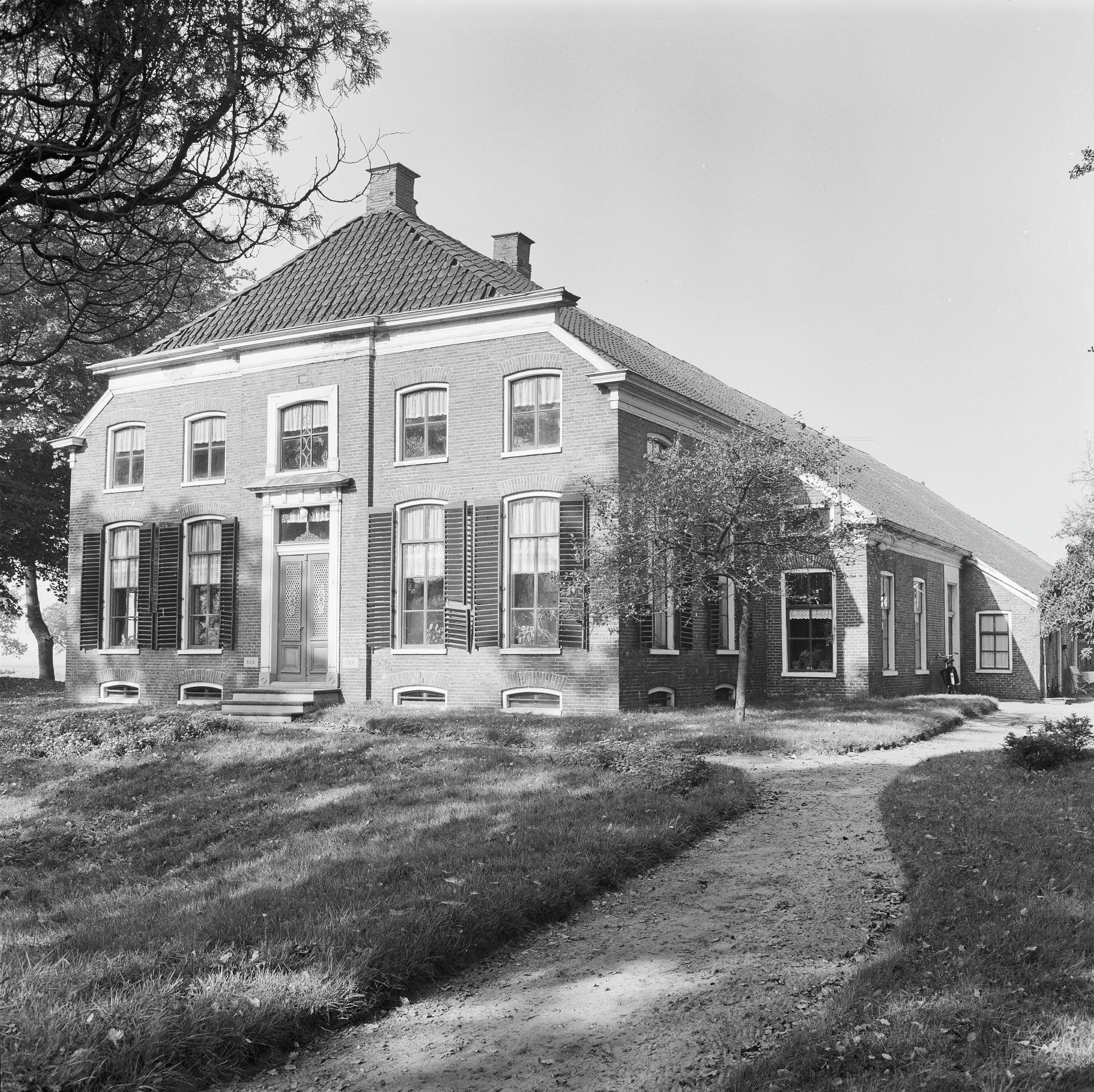
Farm (1969)
