= Oldambt (region) =

Coordinates: 53.1500°N 7.0333°E

- Region
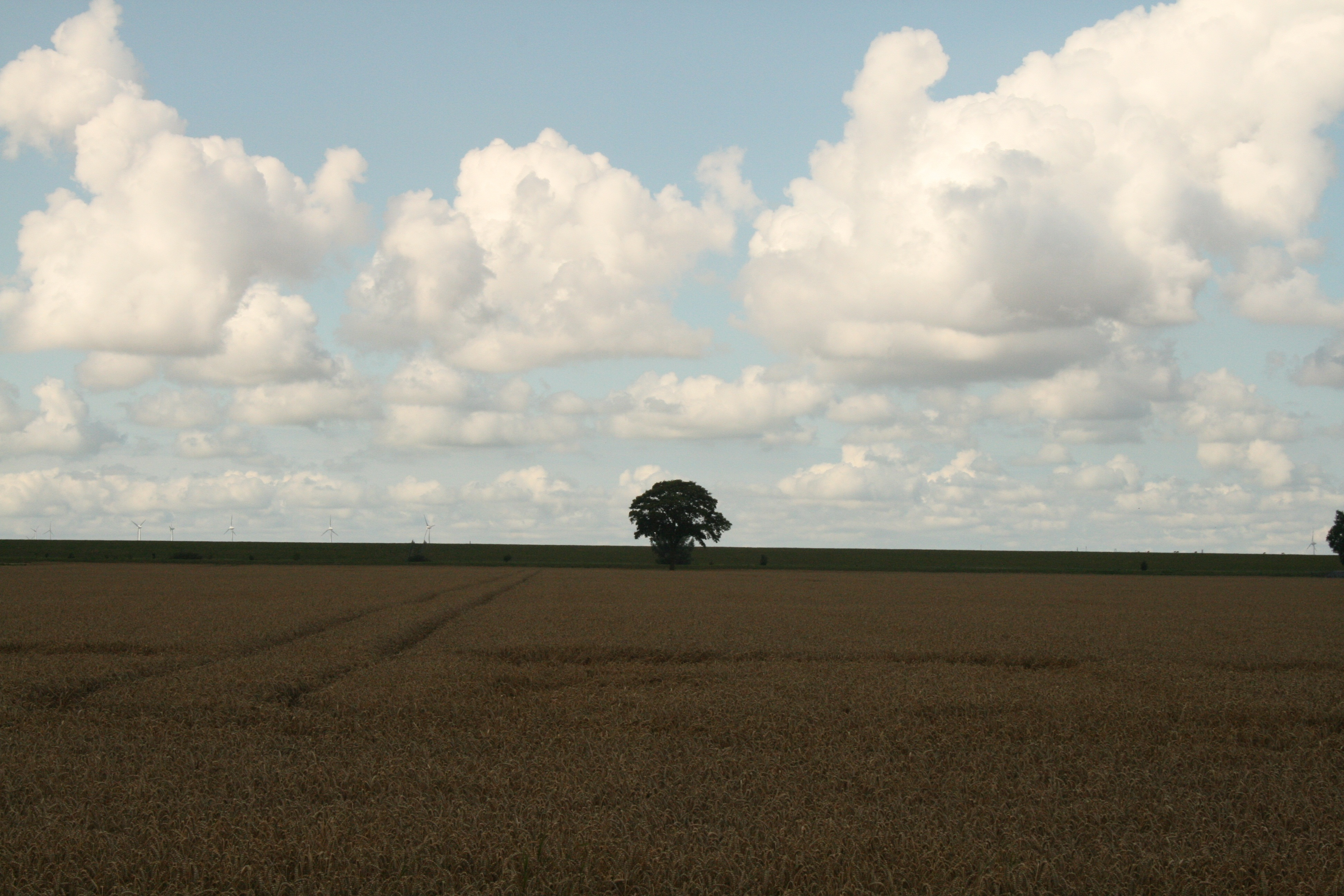
- Reiderwolder Polder

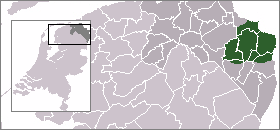
- The location of Oldambt (green) in Groningen (dark grey) in the Netherlands (light grey)
- Country: Netherlands
- Province: Groningen
- Time zone: UTC+1 (CET)
  - Summer (DST): UTC+2 (CEST)
- ISO 3166 code: NL-GR

Oldambt (Dutch pronunciation: [ɔlˈdɑm(p)t]) is a region in the northeast of the province Groningen in the Netherlands. It is located on the Dutch-German border.
