= Alteveer, Groningen =

Alteveer
- Village
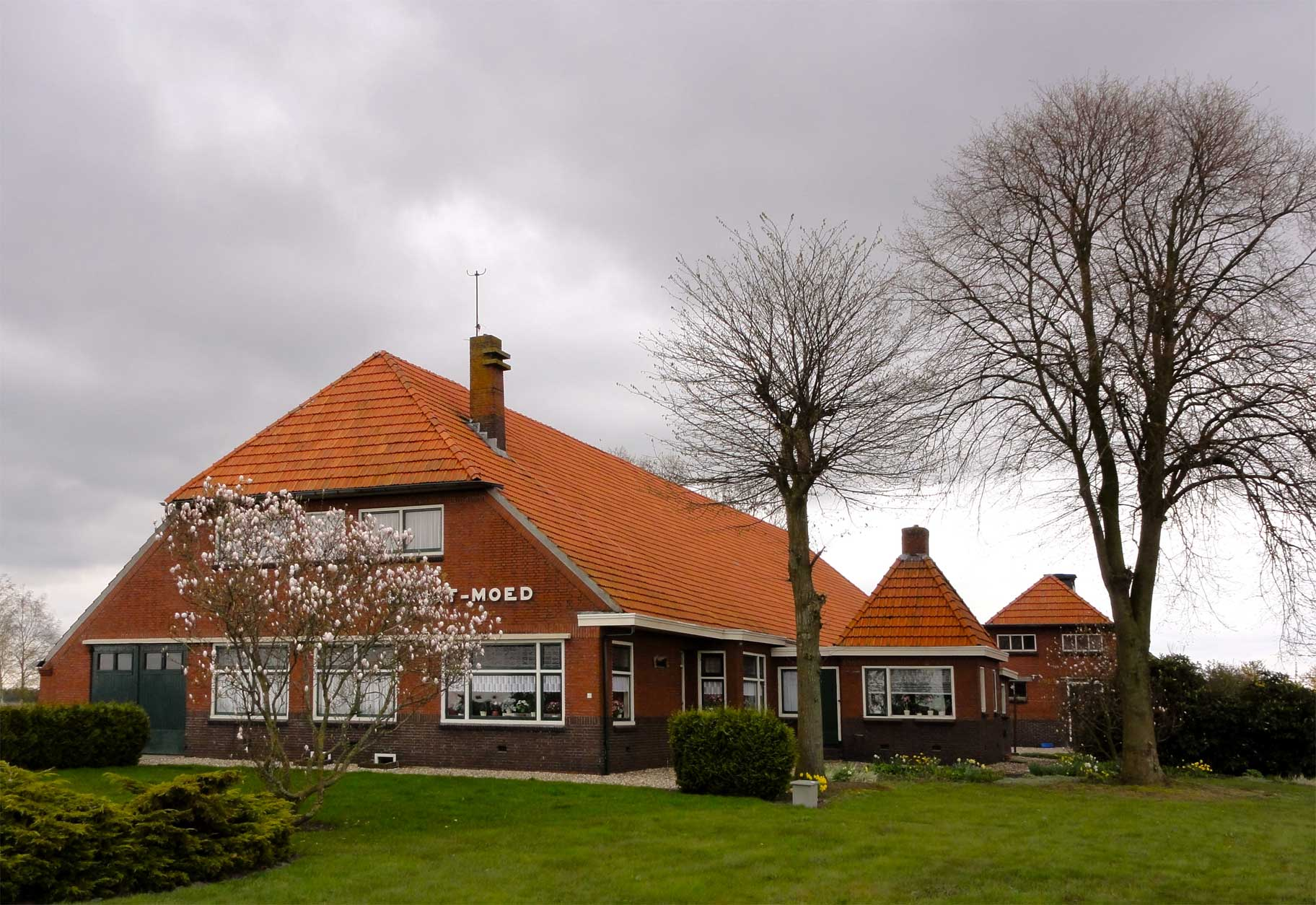
- Farmhouse in 2010

- Location of Alteveer in the province of Groningen Alteveer (Netherlands)
- Coordinates: 53°3′7″N 6°59′35″E
- Country: Netherlands
- Province: Groningen
- Municipality: Stadskanaal and Pekela

Area
  - Total: 14.48 km^{2} (5.59 sq mi)

Population (2021)
  - Total: 1,155
  - Density: 79.77/km^{2} (206.6/sq mi)
- Postal code: 9661 & 9663

Alteveer (Dutch pronunciation: [ˈɑltəveːr]) is a village in the Dutch province of Groningen. It is largely located in the municipality Stadskanaal, about 7 km northeast of the centre of Stadskanaal. The houses on the western edge of the village are part of the municipality of Pekela. The name literally means "all too far".

== Overview ==
Alteveer was founded along the Alteveer canal, which runs north from Stadskanaal. The canal was dug to exploit the peat in the area in the late 19th century. The village was founded in the early 20th century as a linear settlement along the road from Nieuwe Pekela to Onstwedde.

Some of the houses in the village were sod houses. In the early 20th century, most of the sod houses were condemned. The last house was used by Fennechien Wiekens. In 1941, her house was moved to the Netherlands Open Air Museum where it is still on display.

Older topographical maps show that a part of the current village of Alteveer was formerly part of the neighbouring village of Tange; a name now used for the houses closer to the village of Onstwedde.

The part of the village in Pekela ceased to be a statistical area after the mid 1990s, and has become part of Nieuwe Pekela.

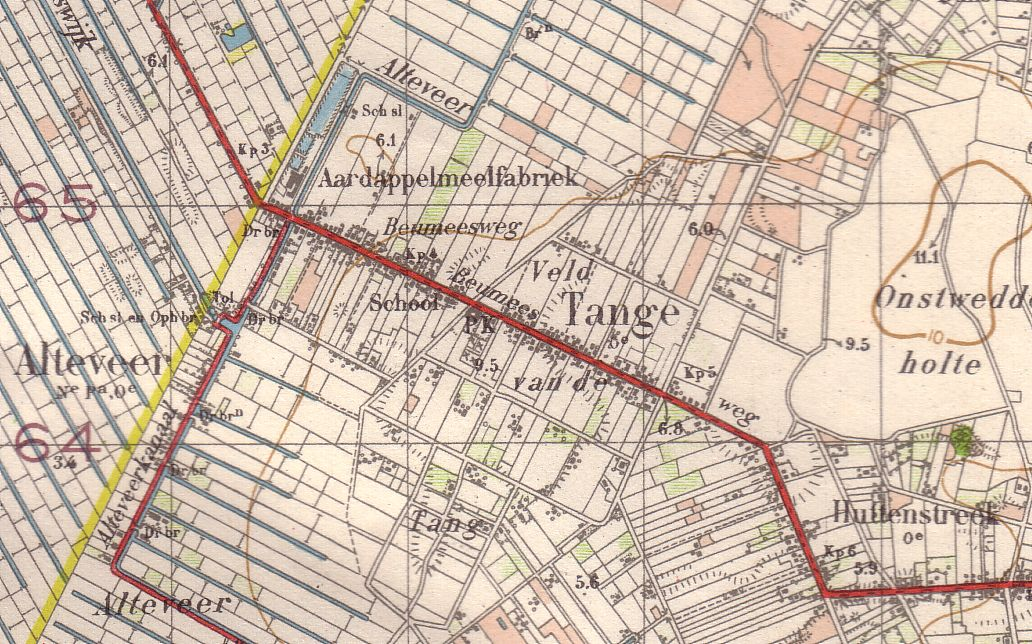
Tange and Alteveer on a 1933 map.
