= Nieuwe Pekela =

- Village
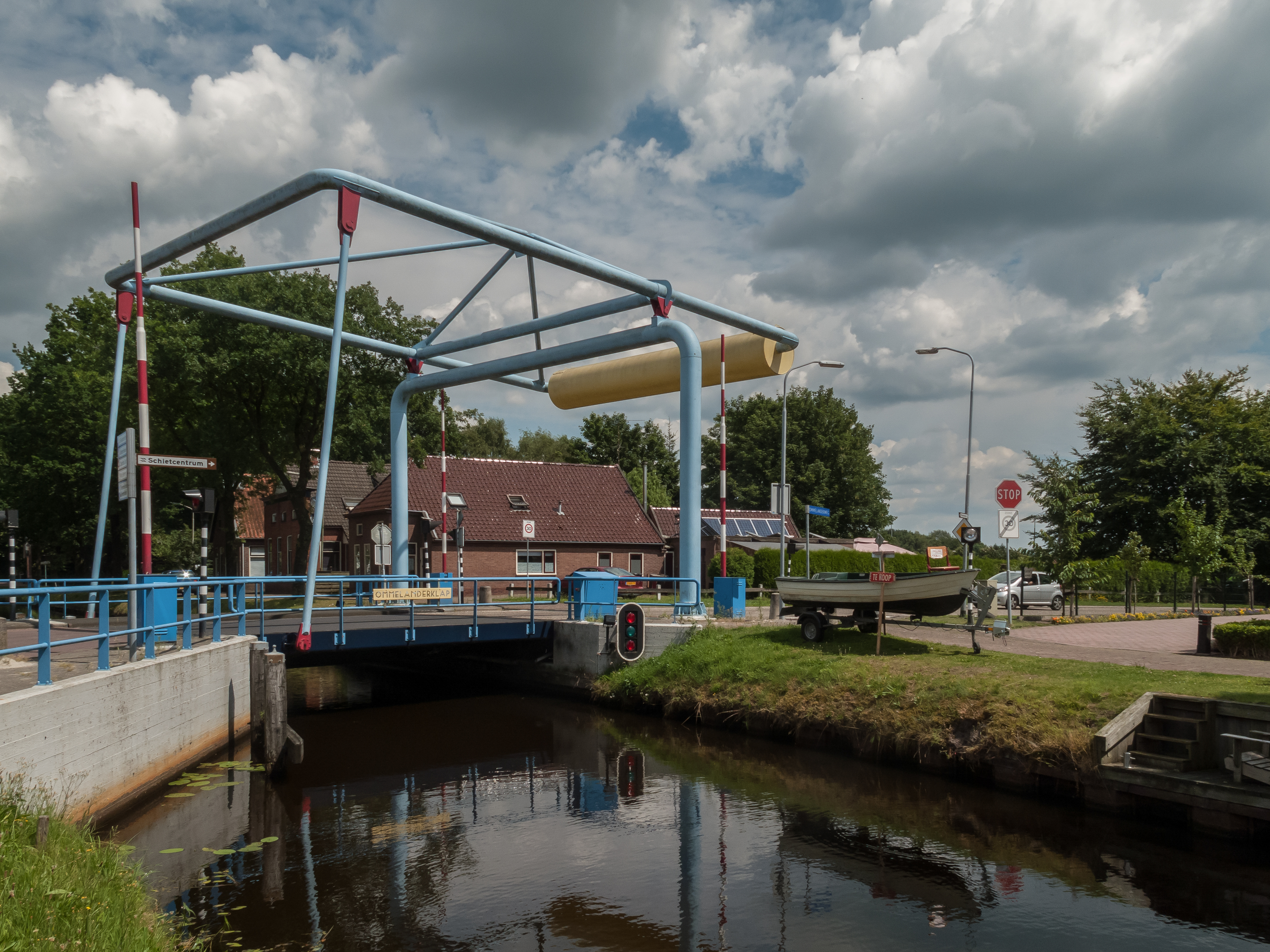
- Drawing bridge: de Ommelanderklap

- Flag

- Location of Nieuwe Pekela in the province of Groningen Nieuwe Pekela (Netherlands)
- Coordinates: 53°4′43″N 6°57′51″E
- Country: Netherlands
- Province: Groningen
- Municipality: Pekela
- Established: 1704

Area
  - Total: 11.27 km^{2} (4.35 sq mi)

Population (2021)
  - Total: 3,855
  - Density: 342.1/km^{2} (885.9/sq mi)
- Postal code: 9663
- Area code: 0597

Nieuwe Pekela (Gronings: Nij Pekel) is a village in the Dutch province of Groningen. It is located in the municipality of Pekela, about 7 km (5 miles) southeast of Veendam. The village started as a peat colony, and was named after the river Pekel A. During the 19th century, the village was active in the maritime trade, and contains a museum dedicated to the maritime history. In December 1969, the first women strike of the Netherlands occurred in Nieuwe Pekela.

== History ==
In the 1590s, the Friesche Compagnie (Frisian Company) was founded to exploit the peat in the area. In 1599, the raised bog around the River Pekel A was bought and subdivided in 101 lots. Houses were built along the river for the workers. In 1635, it became part of the Groninger Peat Colonies, and was controlled by the city of Groningen as a colony. In 1704, the linear settlement was split into Oude Pekela (Old) and Nieuwe Pekela (New), because a second Dutch Reformed Church was built.

In 1801, all towns and villages had to be governed by a municipality, and the peat colony came to an end. In 1808, Nieuwe Pekela was home to 3,299 people. In 1810, after Napoleon annexed the Batavian Republic, Nieuwe Pekela became a separate commune and a mayor was appointed the next year.

In 1877, the Pekel A was extended to Stadskanaal and was no longer a dead end. The part of the river from Oude Pekela to Stadskanaal was later renamed Pekelderdiep.

Nieuwe Pekela was a separate municipality until 1990, when it merged with Oude Pekela to form the new municipality of Pekela.

=== Lutheran church ===
The peat industry started to attract workers from neighbouring Germany who brought their own form of Protestantism: the Lutheran church. The closest church was in Winschoterzijl which was four hours by foot. A ship was quicker, however it was not always possible during the winter.

In 1762, a Lutheran church was constructed in Nieuwe Pekela. The church burned down in 1865, but was rebuilt in 1868. It was declared a monument in 2000. Since the late 20th century, attendance of the Lutheran church is in decline, and they nowadays cooperate with the Dutch Reformed Church and often have joint services.

=== Museum Kapiteinshuis Pekela ===
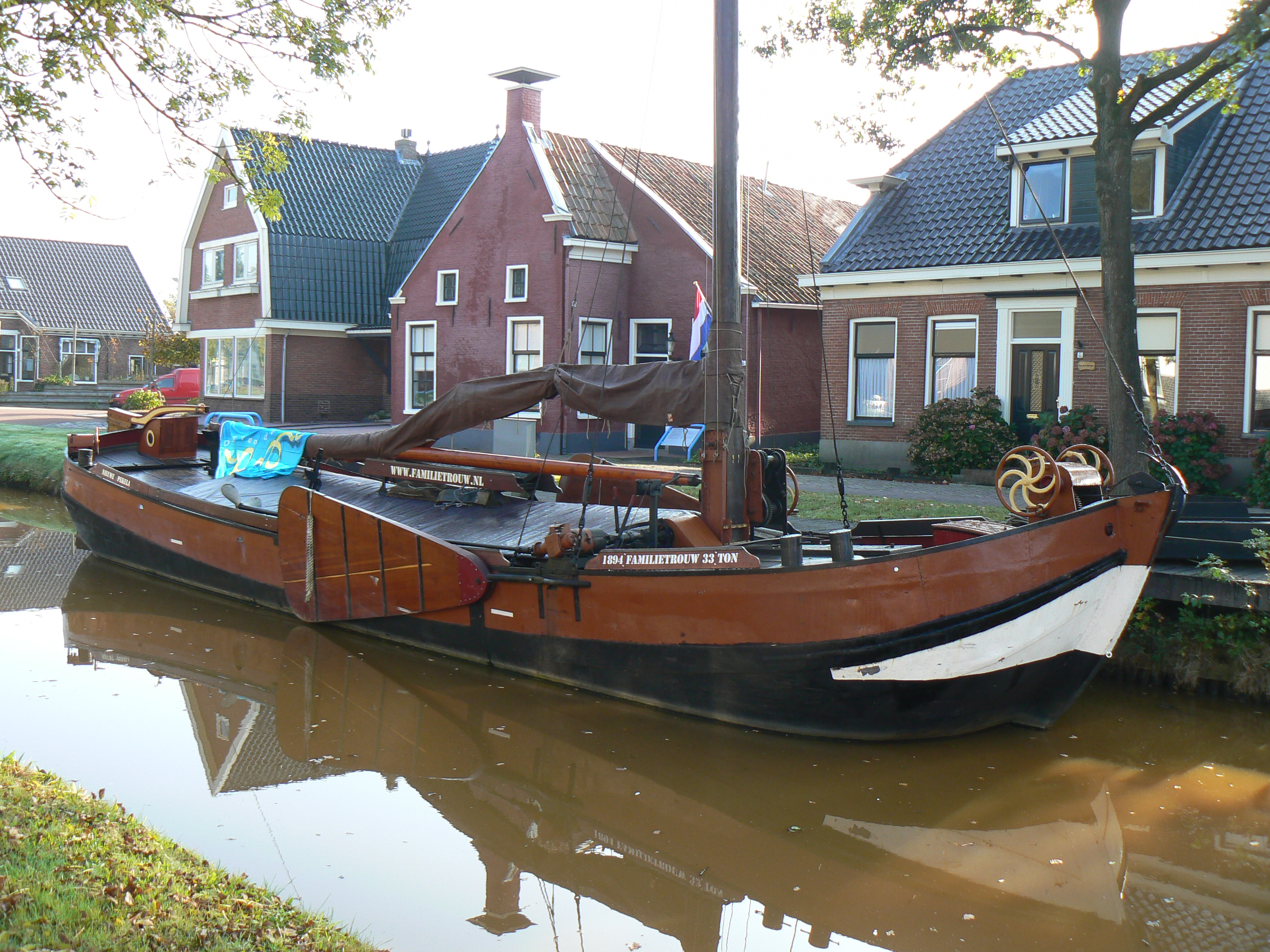
Museum Kapiteinshuis Pekela

The river Pekel A connected Nieuwe Pekela with the Dollart and the Wadden Sea. Around 1800, the peat became exhausted, and the skippers started to make longer journeys, to Holland, and later to England, the Baltic and the Mediterranean. At first the maritime industry flourished, but the increasing popularity of the steamship resulted in a gradual decline.

In 1975, Bram Westers, the former Director of the Groninger Museum, bought the former residential home of Captain Kornelis Jans Boon. The building dates from 1799 and was one of the few captain's homes in original condition. In 1989, Westers, who had retired from the Groninger Museum, started to transform the house into a museum.

The museum opened in 1990, and provides an overview of the maritime history of the region. There is a large collection of pottery and paintings collected by the skippers of the Pekelas. There is a special emphasis on the many gold and silver objects acquired during the journeys. A part of the house was still used as a residence. In 2006, the whole building became a museum.

=== 1969 women's strike ===
In 1920, the cigar factory Albatros was founded in Nieuwe Pekela. After World War II, it was renamed Champ Clark, after an American politician. The 18-year-old Grietje Schoonhoven was employed at the factory, and discovered that her male colleagues had been given a raise while the salary of the women had remained the same. The women twice went to the management who refused to raise their salary.

On 15 December 1969, the 30 women employed at Champ Clark decided to call a wildcat strike, and demanded equal pay. They became the first women in the history of the Netherlands to go on strike. The factory threatened to fire them, however the women went to Fré Meis of the Communist Party (CPN) who had previously organised successful strikes in neighbouring Oude Pekela. Meis brought in the union.

The union started negotiating with the management of factory. After four weeks, the strike was called off, because the women received a raise from ƒ35 to ƒ58 per week, but also the men received a raise from ƒ45 to ƒ58, because they too had been paid less than the collective agreement for the tobacco industry.

An additional result of the strike was that the unions decided that regional differences in pay were no longer considered acceptable, and that women and men should get equal pay. However, the union members who were members of the Communist Party were disbarred from the union. The list of names was supplied by the Binnenlandse Veiligheidsdienst, the Dutch intelligence agency. The cigar factory closed in 1971.

== Notable people ==
- Jan de Boer (1859–1941), gymnast and flagbearer in the 1908 Olympics.
- Marcel Meijer (b. 1966), the mayor of the Danish island of Samsø was born in Nieuwe Pekela.
- René Paas (b. 1966), the King's Commissioner in the province of Groningen, lived in Nieuwe Pekela in his youth.
- Janneke Snijder-Hazelhoff (b. 1952), politician
- Roland Kayn (1933-2011) composer of electronic music, lived in Nieuwe Pekela in his later years.

== Gallery ==
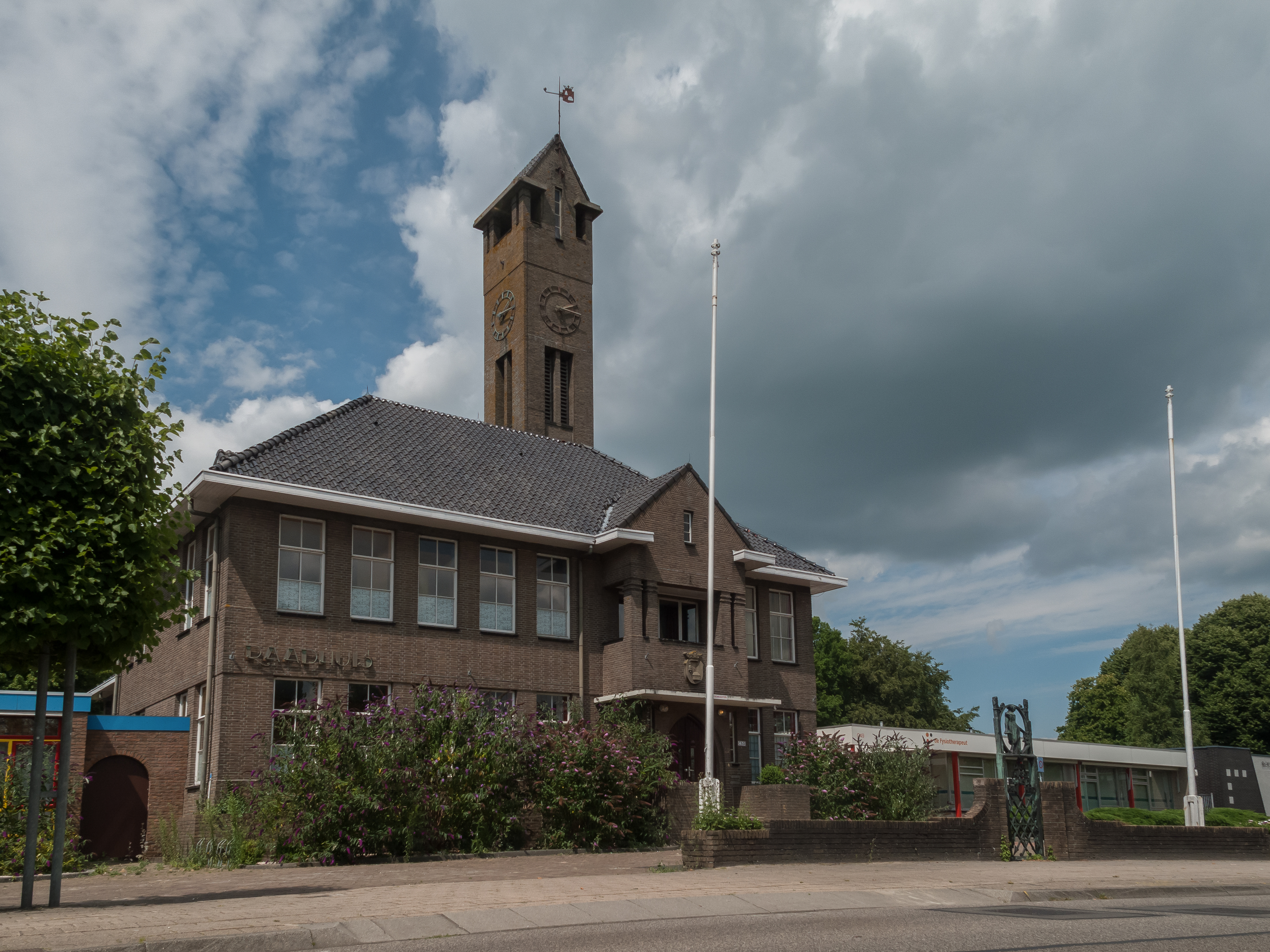
Former townhall

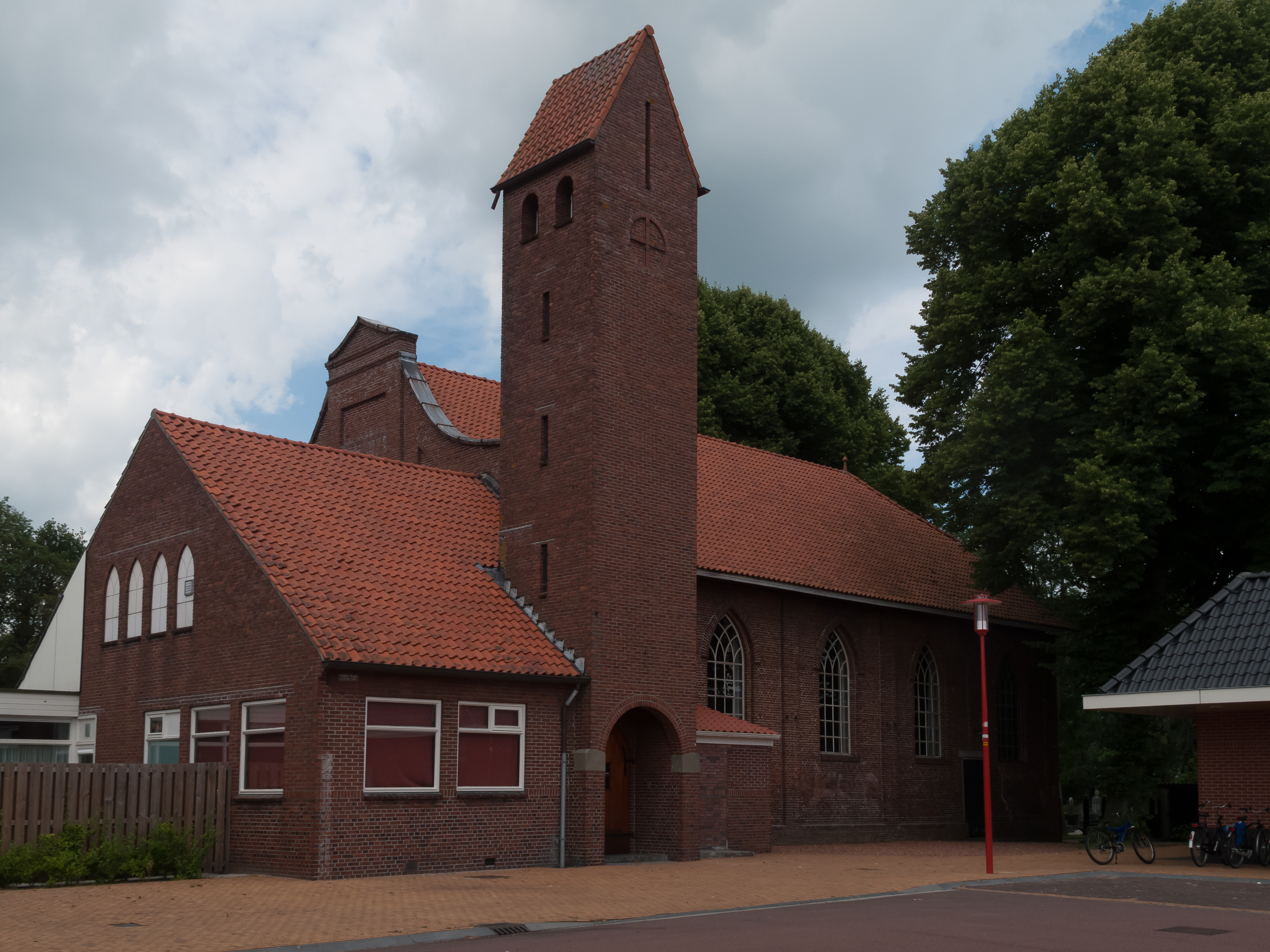
Reformed church

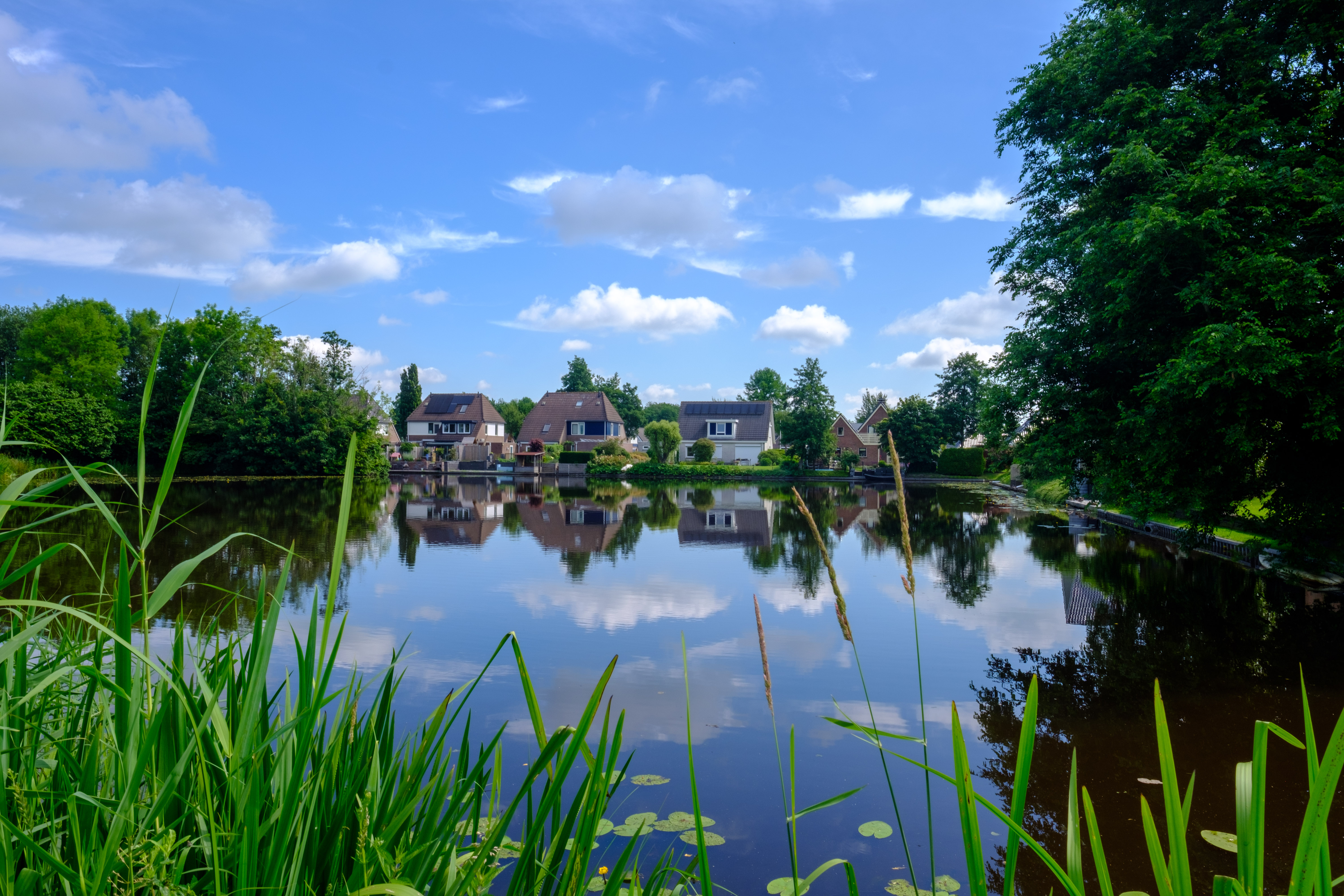
Poortmanswijk

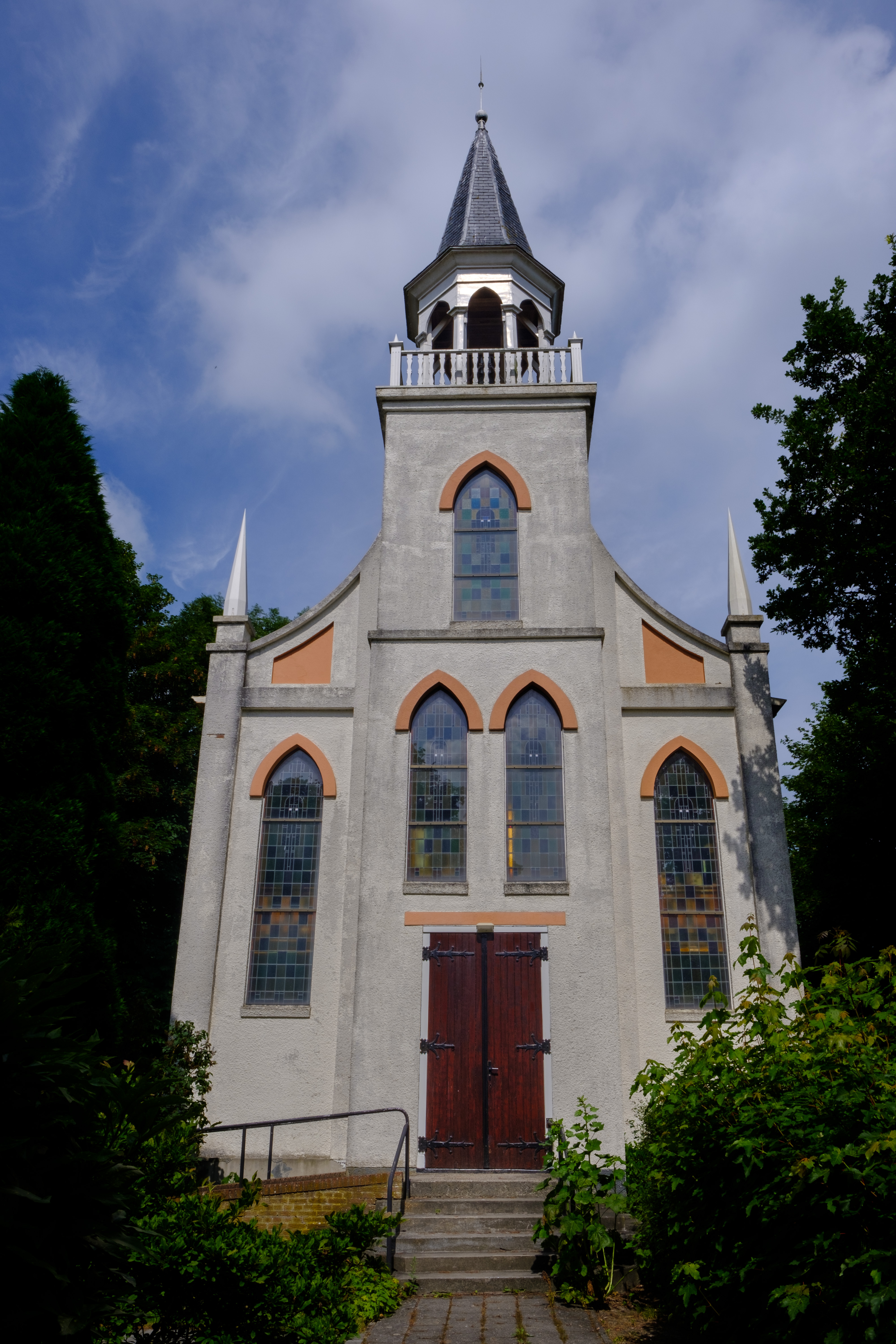
Lutheran church

== Bibliography ==
- Bosgra, W.H. (1930). Uit Pekela's verleden (in Dutch). Oude Pekela: Feringa.
