= Pekel A =

River in Groningen

Pekel A Pekel Aa
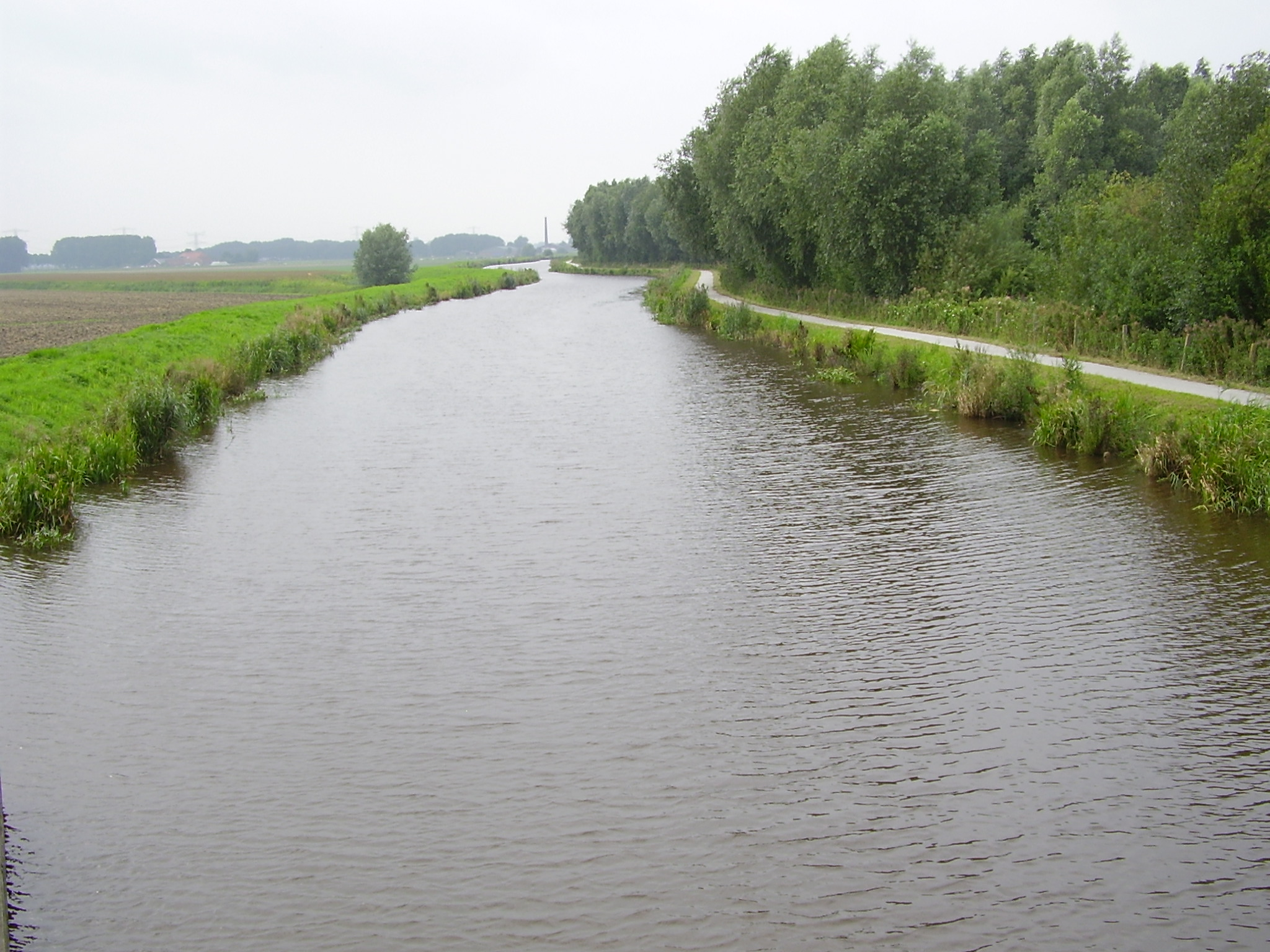

Location
- Country: Netherlands
- Province: Groningen

Physical characteristics
- Source
  - location: Pekelderdiep
  - coordinates: 53.11212°N 7.02543°E
- Mouth: De Bult
  - coordinates: 53.1505°N 7.1277°E

Basin features
- Progression: Westerwoldse Aa → Dollart → Wadden Sea

Pekel A or Pekel Aa (Dutch pronunciation: [ˈpeːkəl ˈaː]) is a river in the Province of Groningen in the Netherlands. The villages of Oude Pekela and Nieuwe Pekela have been named after the river. The name translates to Brine (Pekel) River (A), and used to flow from the Dollart into a large raised bog. The Dollart was poldered from the 15th century until 1924, and the river now has its source at the confluence with the Westerwoldsche Aa at De Bult. The river was canalised and extended. The part from Oude Pekela to Stadskanaal was renamed Pekelderdiep. From 1599 until 1810, the area through which the river flowed, was a peat colony. In the 20th century, the Pekel A was a heavily polluted river, but it has been cleaned up since the 1970s.

== History ==
The Dollart is a bay in the Wadden Sea which was gradually expanding in size. Around 1600, it peaked at around 250 square kilometres (97 sq mi). The Pekel A was a brackish river which had its mouth at the Dollart near Winschoterzijl, and flowed into a large raised bog where it ended.

The area around the river was an extensive swamp area with few inhabitants, however it formed a natural border between Groningen, East Frisia and the Prince-Bishopric of Münster, and changed ownership several times throughout its history. In 1316, it was in possession by Münster who demanded a taxation of one chicken per house per year. In 1478, the castle Pekelborg was built near the mouth of the river by Groningen, and was conquered in 1499 by Edzard I of East Frisia. In 1619, it was purchased by Groningen who would remain the owner except for a 1672 invasion by Münster. In 1814, the chicken taxation was finally abolished.

The Dollart was poldered from the 15th century until 1924, and the river now has its mouth at the confluence with the Westerwoldsche Aa at De Bult. The Westerwoldsche Aa forms the border between the Netherlands and Germany.

== Peat colony ==
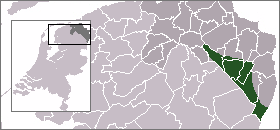
Groninger Peat Colonies

In the 1590s, the Friesche Compagnie (Frisian Company) was founded to exploit the bog. In 1599, the land around Pekel A was bought and subdivided in 101 lots. The river was canalised and deepened by 1608, and the company started to build houses along the canal for their 500 workers. The exploitation of peat turned out to be profitable, however the city of Groningen decided to ban the shipment of peat, and in 1635, the company was forced to sell 58 out of 101 lots which the city then offered for rent. This was the start of the so-called Groninger Peat Colonies. A Utrecht-based company who was exploiting the area around Hoogezand was also purchased, and soon the city of Groningen controlled the south-eastern part of the province as a colony.

Map of the Pekel A (c. 1650) North is left. A canal had been dug, but the meandering river is still visible on the right

In 1704, the linear settlement was split into Oude Pekela (Old) and Nieuwe Pekela (New), because a second church was built. In 1877, the Pekel A was extended to Stadskanaal and was no longer a dead end. The part of the river from Oude Pekela to Stadskanaal was later renamed Pekelderdiep.

In 1801, all towns and villages had to be governed by a municipality, and the peat colony came to an end. The archives up to 1808 are lost, but in 1808, J.T. Klatter was chosen as the President of the District of Oude and Nieuwe Pekela. In 1810, Napoleon annexed the Batavian Republic, and the communes of Oude Pekela and Nieuwe Pekela were established. A mayor was appointed the next year. In 1990, the municipalities merged into Pekela.

== Pollution ==
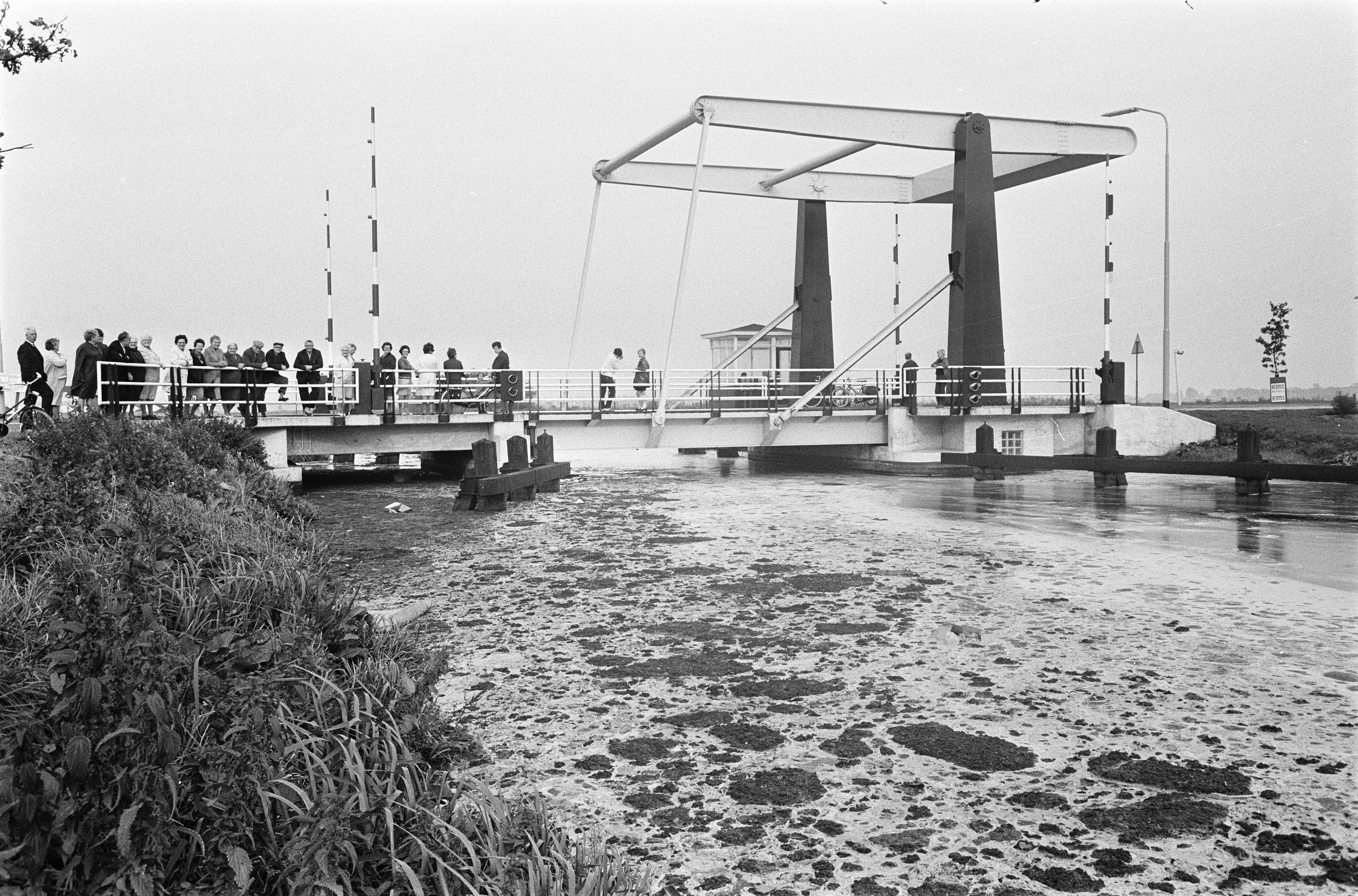
1969 visit of Queen Juliana to Oude Pekela

Oude and Nieuwe Pekela developed into the centre of the cardboard and potato starch industry. The canal became heavily polluted and was known for its stench. During a visit of five Chinese businessmen, a cigarette was thrown into the river as a demonstration, and the river immediately caught fire. The population of Oude Pekela started to demand the closure of the canal.

In 1971, the factories were forced to create water treatment plants before discharging into the canal. The regulation resulted in many factories closing down. The pollution was not limited to the Pekel A, because the southern end of the Dollart had become hypoxic and a dead zone. By 1983, the water had become significant cleaner. A further strengthening of standards in 1991, resulted in the disappearance of the dead zone in the Dollart. The improved ecology resulted increasing numbers of birds and fishes, but worm eating birds like the grey plover and the black-tailed godwit started to migrate from the Dollart.

== Bibliography ==
- Bosgra, W.H. (1930). Uit Pekela's verleden (in Dutch). Oude Pekela: Feringa.
- Essink, Karel (2009). De Dollard, een dynamisch systeem onder invloed van de mens (PDF). Stormvloed 1509 - Geschiedenis van de Dollard (in Dutch). Archived from the original (PDF) on 30 April 2019.
