= Pekela =

- Municipality
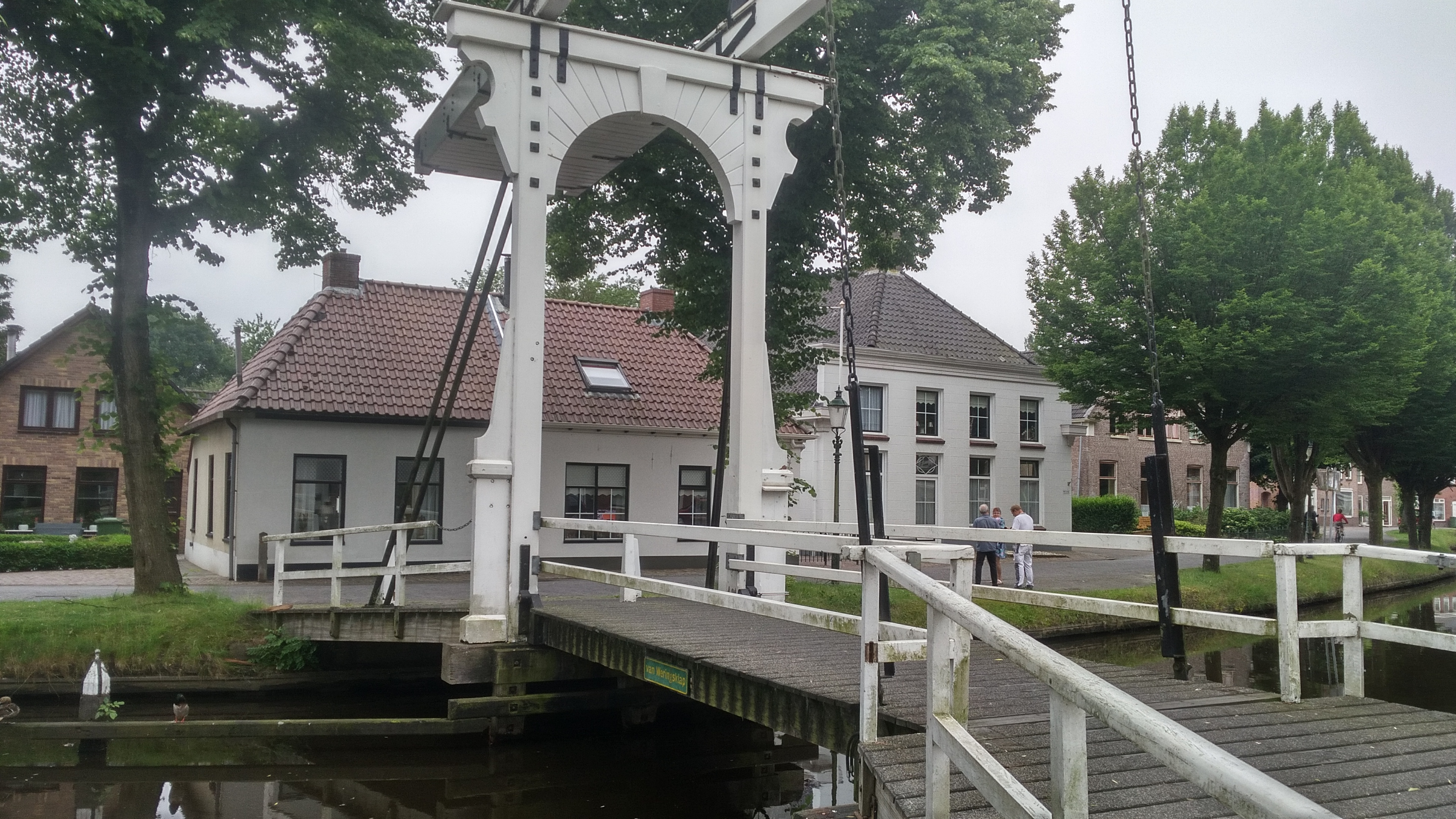
- Bridge in Oude Pekela

- Flag Coat of arms

- Location of Pekela (green) in the province of Groningen (dark grey) in the Netherlands (light grey)
- Coordinates: 53°6′N 7°0′E
- Country: Netherlands
- Province: Groningen

Government
  - Body: Municipal council
  - Mayor: Jaap Kuin (PvdA)

Area
  - Total: 50.20 km^{2} (19.38 sq mi)
  - Land: 49.04 km^{2} (18.93 sq mi)
  - Water: 1.16 km^{2} (0.45 sq mi)
- Elevation: 1 m (3.3 ft)

Population (January 2021)
  - Total: 12,176
  - Density: 248/km^{2} (640/sq mi)
- Time zone: UTC+1 (CET)
  - Summer (DST): UTC+2 (CEST)
- Postcode: 9662–9669
- Area code: 0597
- Website: www.pekela.nl

Pekela (Dutch pronunciation: [ˈpeːkəlaː]) is a municipality in the province of Groningen in the Netherlands. It was created in 1990 when Oude Pekela and Nieuwe Pekela were merged.

== Geography ==
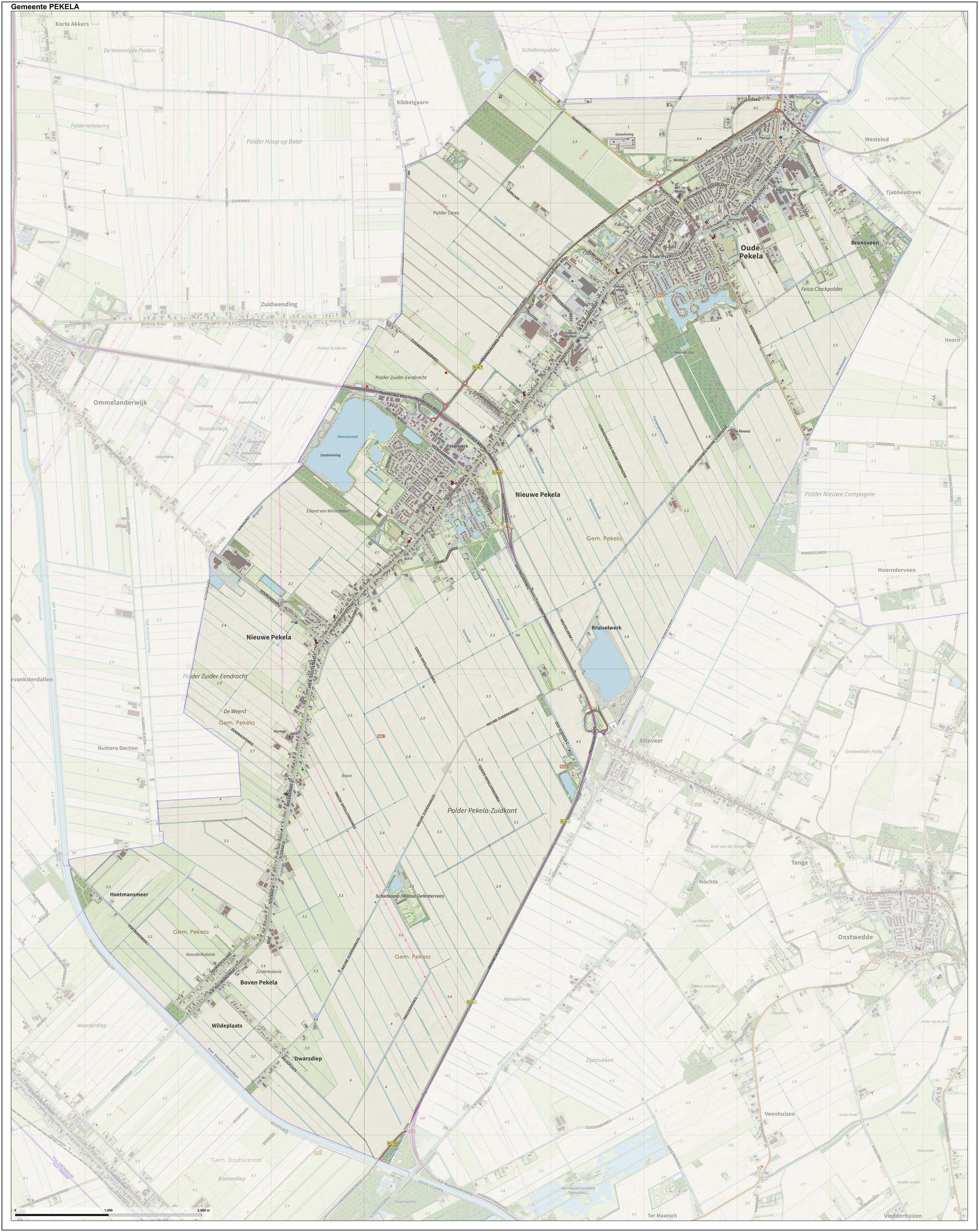
Map of the municipality of Pekela, June 2015

Pekela is located at 53°6′N 7°0′E in the southeast of the province of Groningen in the northeast of the Netherlands. It is bordered by the municipalities of:

- Oldambt (in the north)
- Bellingwedde (east)
- Stadskanaal (south)
- Veendam (west)
- Menterwolde (northwest).

The river Pekel Aa crosses the municipality from north to south. The main population centres in the municipality are the villages of Boven Pekela (Upper Pekela), Nieuwe Pekela (New Pekela), and Oude Pekela (Old Pekela). Part of the village of Alteveer and the hamlets of Bronsveen and Hoetmansmeer are also in the municipality.

The municipality has a total area of 50.20 km^{2} (19.38 sq mi), of which 49.04 km^{2} (18.93 sq mi) is land and 1.16 km^{2} (0.45 sq mi) is water.

== Governance ==
The mayor (burgemeester) of Pekela is Jaap Kuin of the Labour Party. The municipal council consists of 15 seats, which are divided as follows:

Municipality seats
Party	2006	2010	2014	2018	2022	2026
PVV	-	-	-	2	2	4
SP	3	3	4	4	3	4
Samen Voor Pekela	-	4	3	3	3	3
CDA	2	1	2	2	2	2
GroenLinks / Labour	-	-	-	-	-	2
PvdA	7	3	2	2	2	*
GroenLinks	1	2	1	1	2	*
VVD	1	1	2	1	1	-
ChristenUnie	1	-	1	-	-	-
VCP	-	-	1	-	-	-
Total	15	15	15	15	15	15

2026: * GroenLinks and Labour put forward a joint list.

== Demographics ==
In 2021, the municipality had a total population of 12,176, a population density of 248/km^{2} (640/sq mi).

== Notable people ==
- Jan de Boer (1859 in Nieuwe Pekela – 1941) a Dutch gymnast who competed in the 1908 Summer Olympics
- Fré Meis (1921–1992), communist politician
- Janneke Snijder-Hazelhoff (born 1952 in Nieuwe Pekela) a farmer and politician
- Gerard Wiekens (born 1973 in Oude Pekela) a Dutch former footballer with 518 club caps who played for SC Veendam and Manchester City F.C.

== Gallery ==
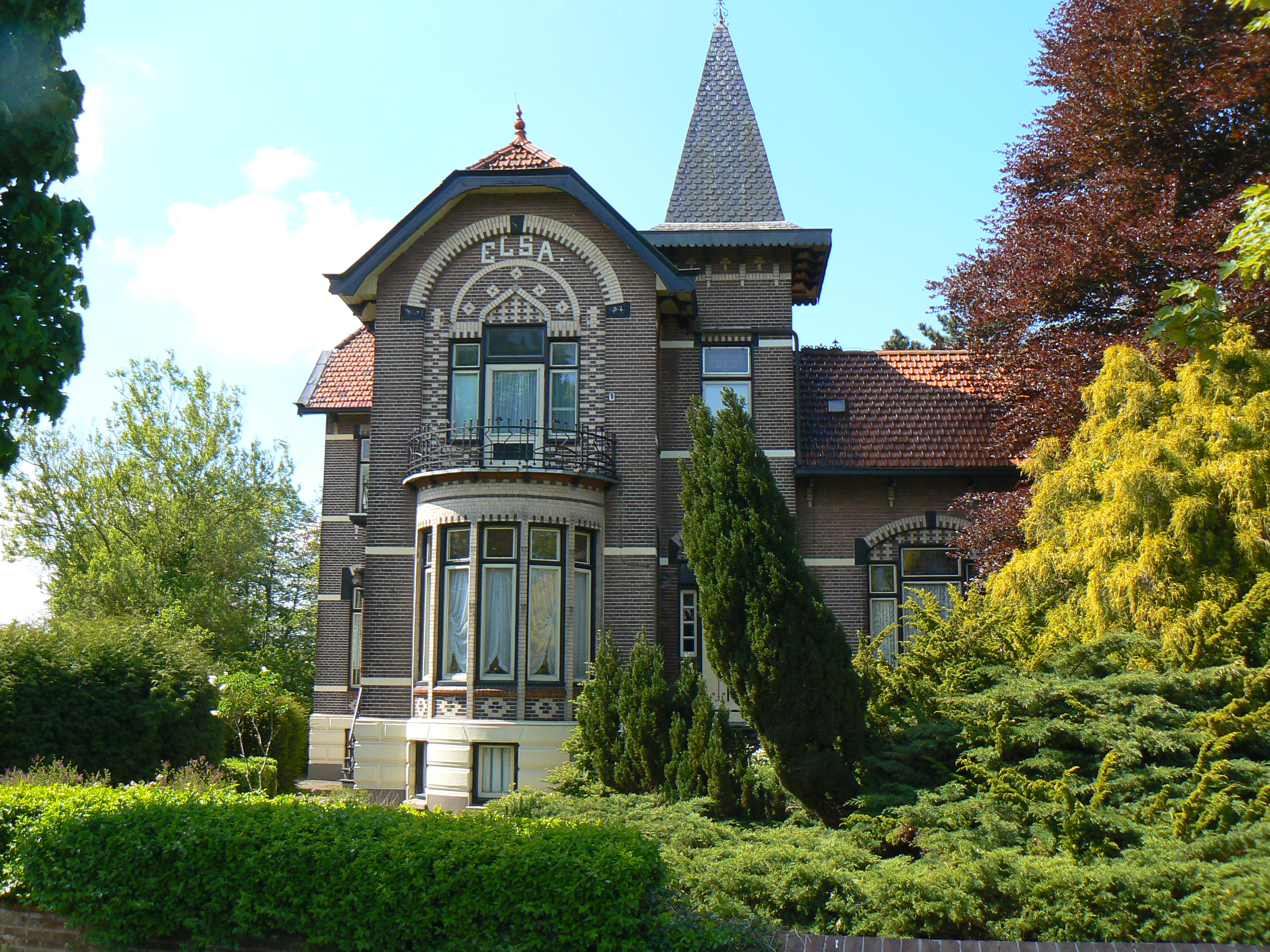
Villa Elsa, Clockstraat, Oude Pekela

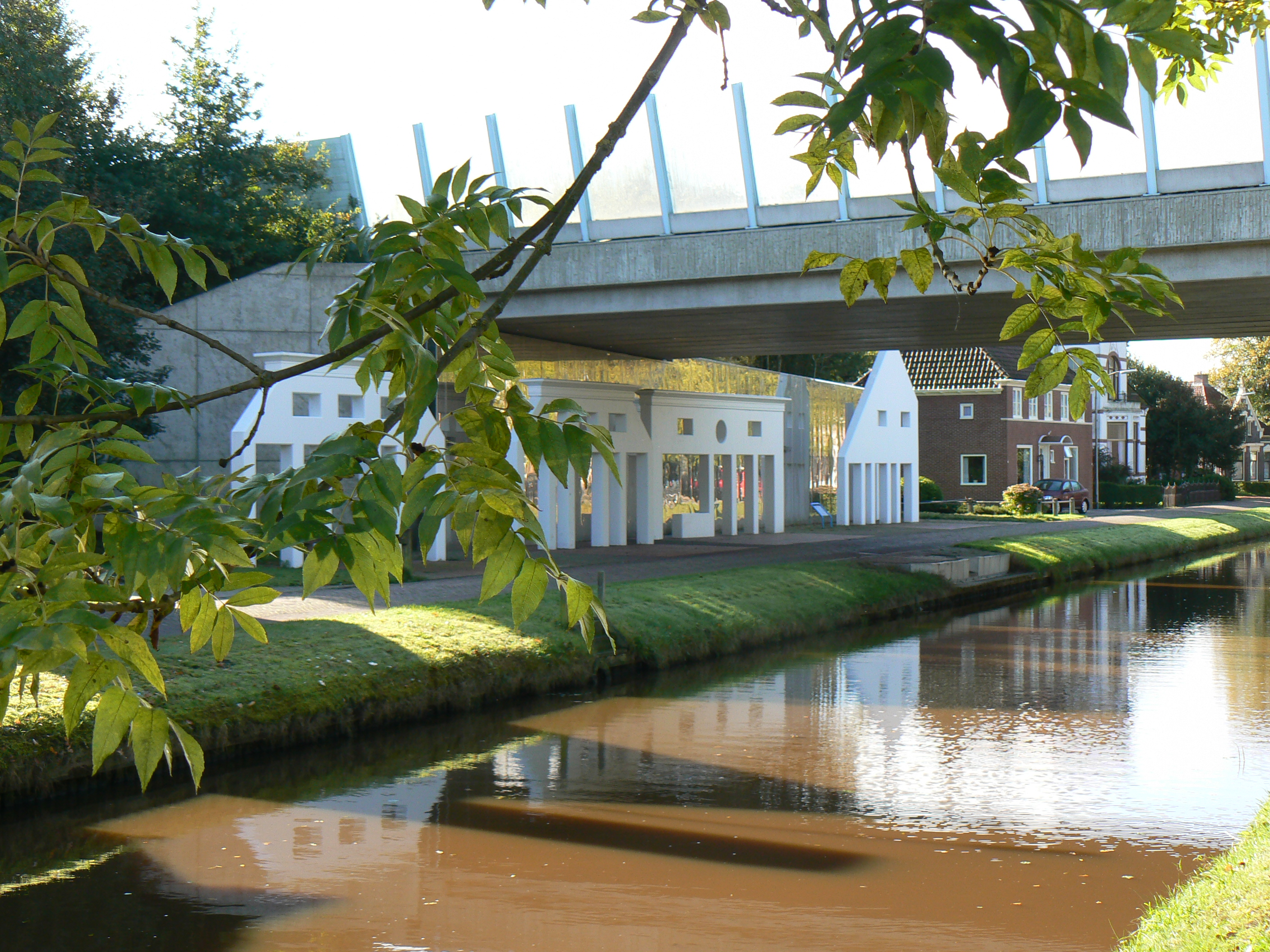
Art project "Geveltjes viadukt" in Nieuwe Pekela

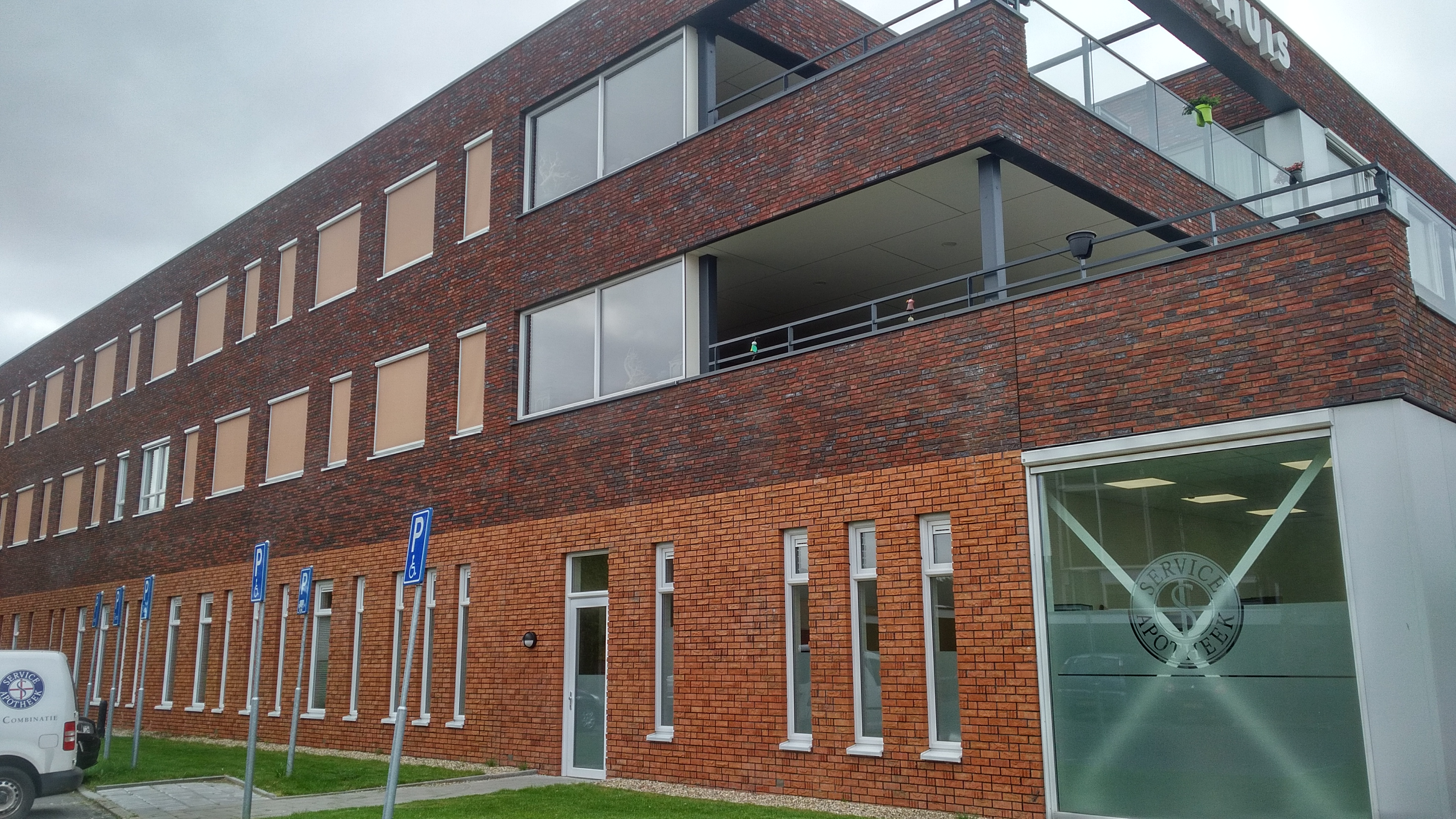
Het Dokhuis, a retirement home in Oude Pekela

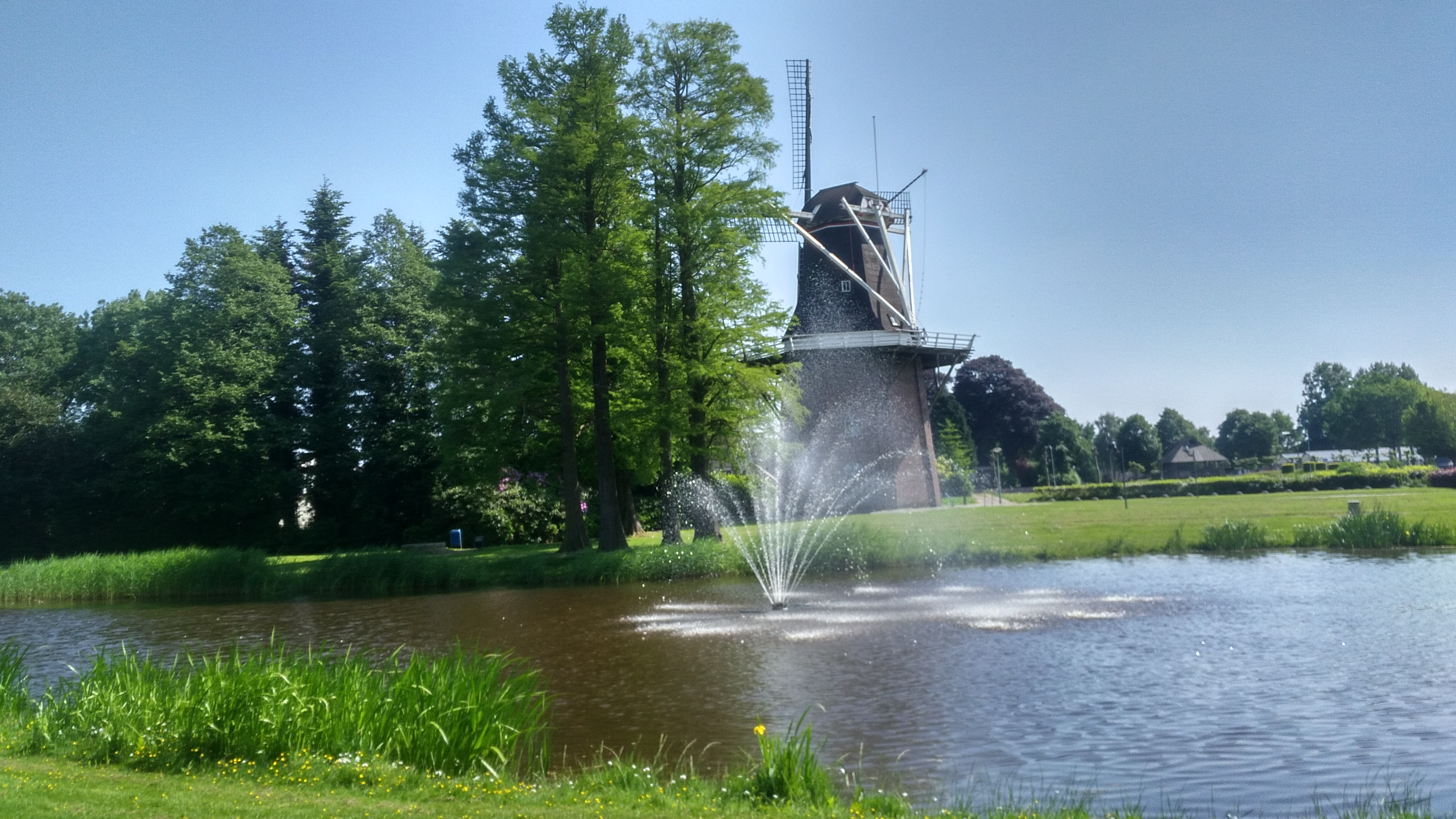
Pekelder Windmill "De Onrust" in Oude Pekela
