= Winschoterzijl =

- Former hamlet
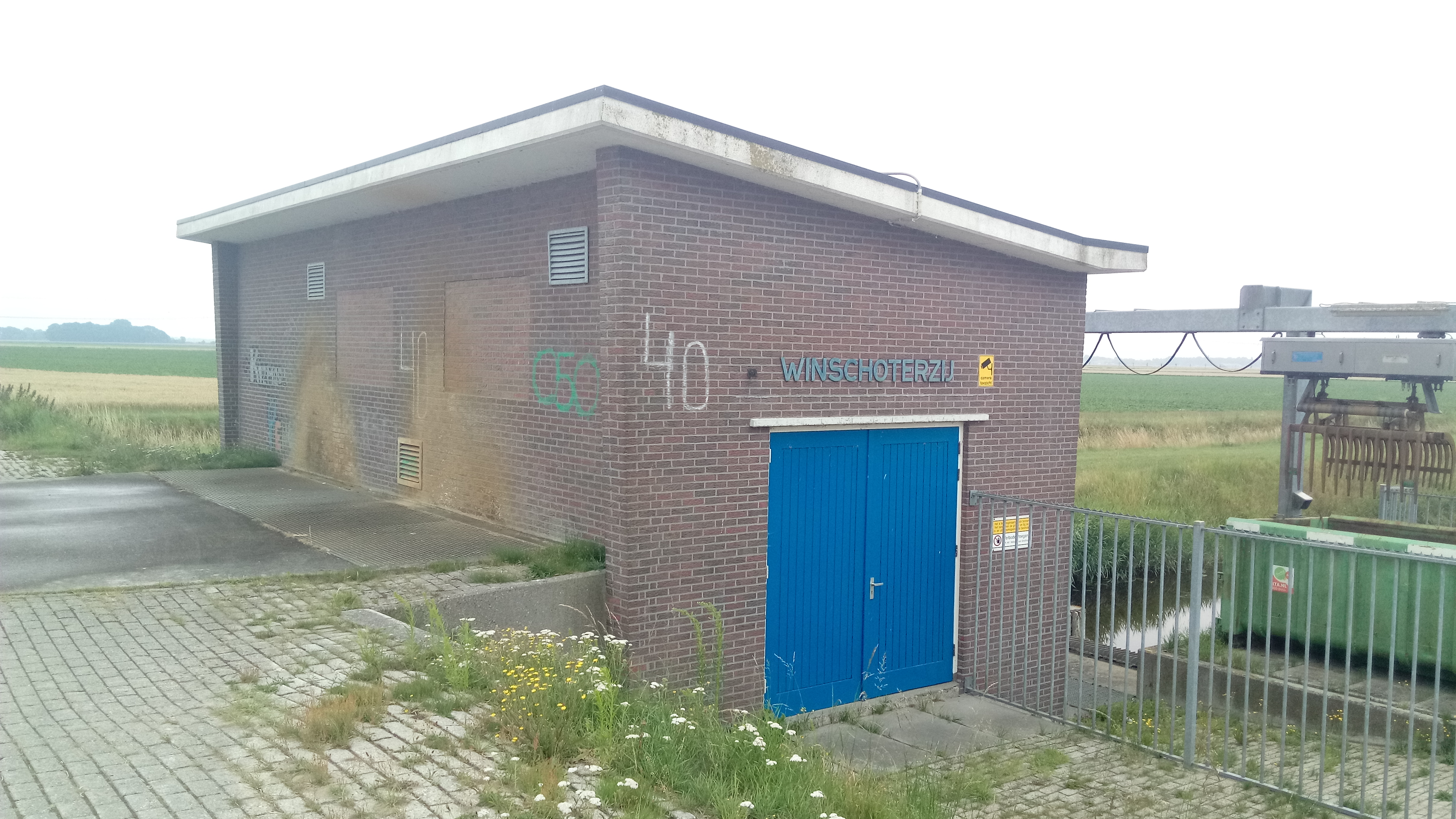
- Winschoterzijl (2019)

- Location in the province of Groningen in the Netherlands
- Coordinates: 53.14385°N 7.08066°E
- Country: Netherlands
- Province: Groningen
- Municipality: Oldambt

Population (1993)
  - Total: 0
- Time zone: UTC+1 (CET)
  - Summer (DST): UTC+2 (CEST)

Winschoterzijl is a former hamlet in the municipality of Oldambt in the northeast of the Netherlands. It was also a sconce, and is still a lock. The village was settled by Lutheran refugees from East Frisia during the Thirty Years' War (1618–1648). In 1992, Winschoterzijl was demolished during the widening of the Pekel A.

== History ==
In 1593, a lock was built near the confluence of the rivers Rensel and Pekel A. In 1608, the river from the Dollart to Winschoterzijl was canalised and widened to 30 feet as the Nieuwediep (now: Winschoterdiep). In 1628, a sconce (fortification) was constructed at Winschoterzijl to protect the Province of Groningen from enemy attack.

In nearby East Frisia, a religious war fought as part of the Thirty Years' War (1618–1648). Lutheran refugees settled in Winschoterzijl, because the area around Winschoten was not governed by the city of Groningen which did not accept refugees, but was a domain of the Princes of Orange who allowed Lutherans.

On 7 September 1672, the army of Münster attacked Groningen, and managed to take Winschoterzijl and the city of Winschoten. The Dutch States Army launched a counter-attack, and the army of Münster was forced to retreat. Winschoterzijl was liberated several days later.

In 1695, a Lutheran church was built in Winschoterzijl, and inaugurated in 1696. On 1 April 1753, Catholics were given permission to establish a church in Winschoterzijl. During mass they were attacked by several hundred farmers and beaten up.

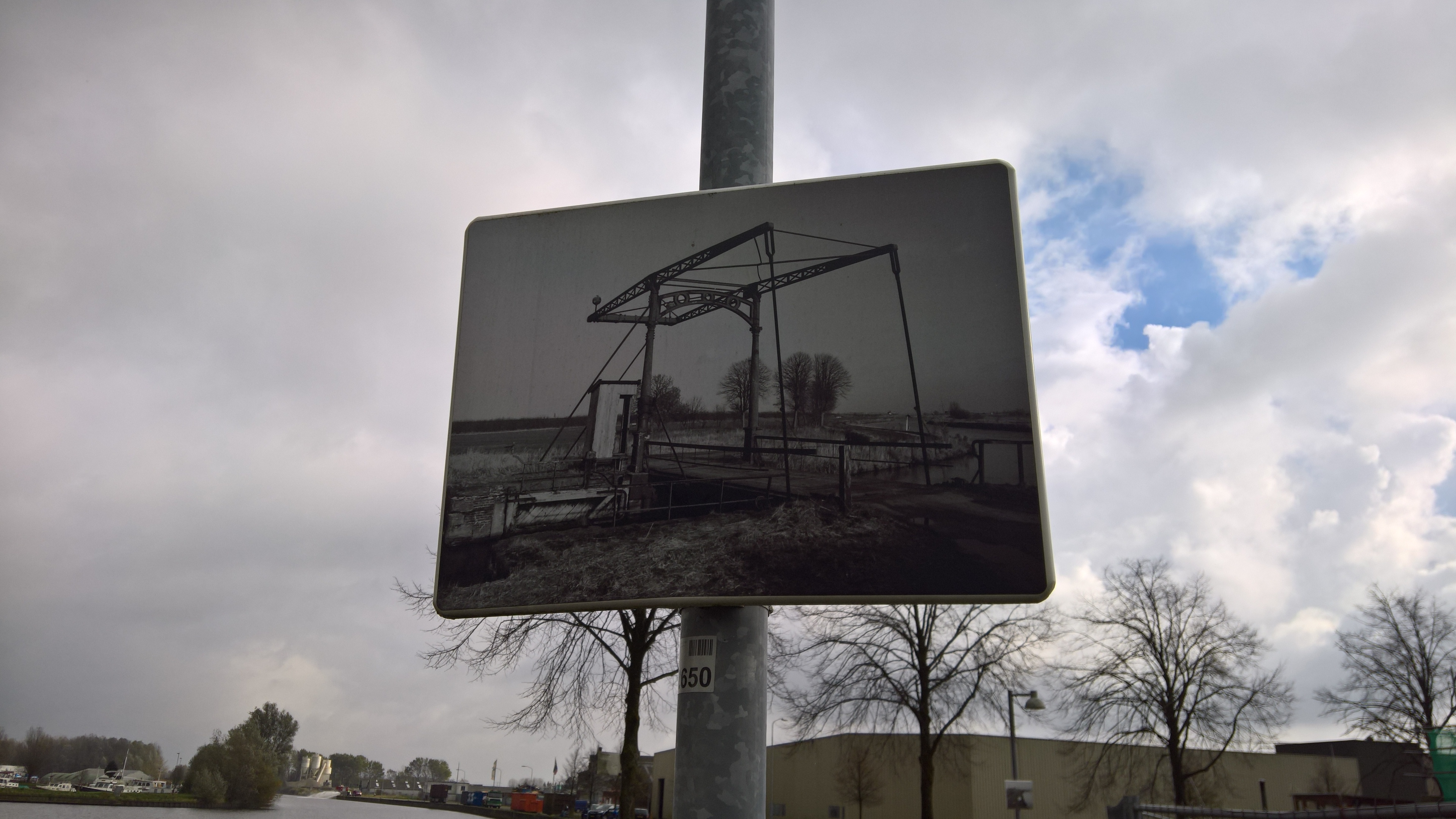
A photograph of the Van Gogh bridge in Winschoterzijl

In 1804, two windmills were built in Winschoterzijl as windpumps. De Olde Molen, one of the windmills burned down in 1814, and was rebuilt in 1815, and has been relocated to Palm Beach, Aruba.

Winschoterzijl remained a small village, and in 1820s a decision was taken to move the church to Winschoten. In 1836, the church was disassembled and rebuilt in Winschoten. At the 1840 census, the population was 69 people spread over the municipalities Wedde, Beerta and Winschoten. Around 1870, the Van Gogh bridge was constructed. The origin of the name of the bridge is unclear.

A decision was taken to widen the Pekel A. The last house in Winschoterzijl was demolished in 1992, the Van Gogh bridge was moved to Winschoten near the McDonald's, and the hamlet was officially disestablished.

== Legacy ==
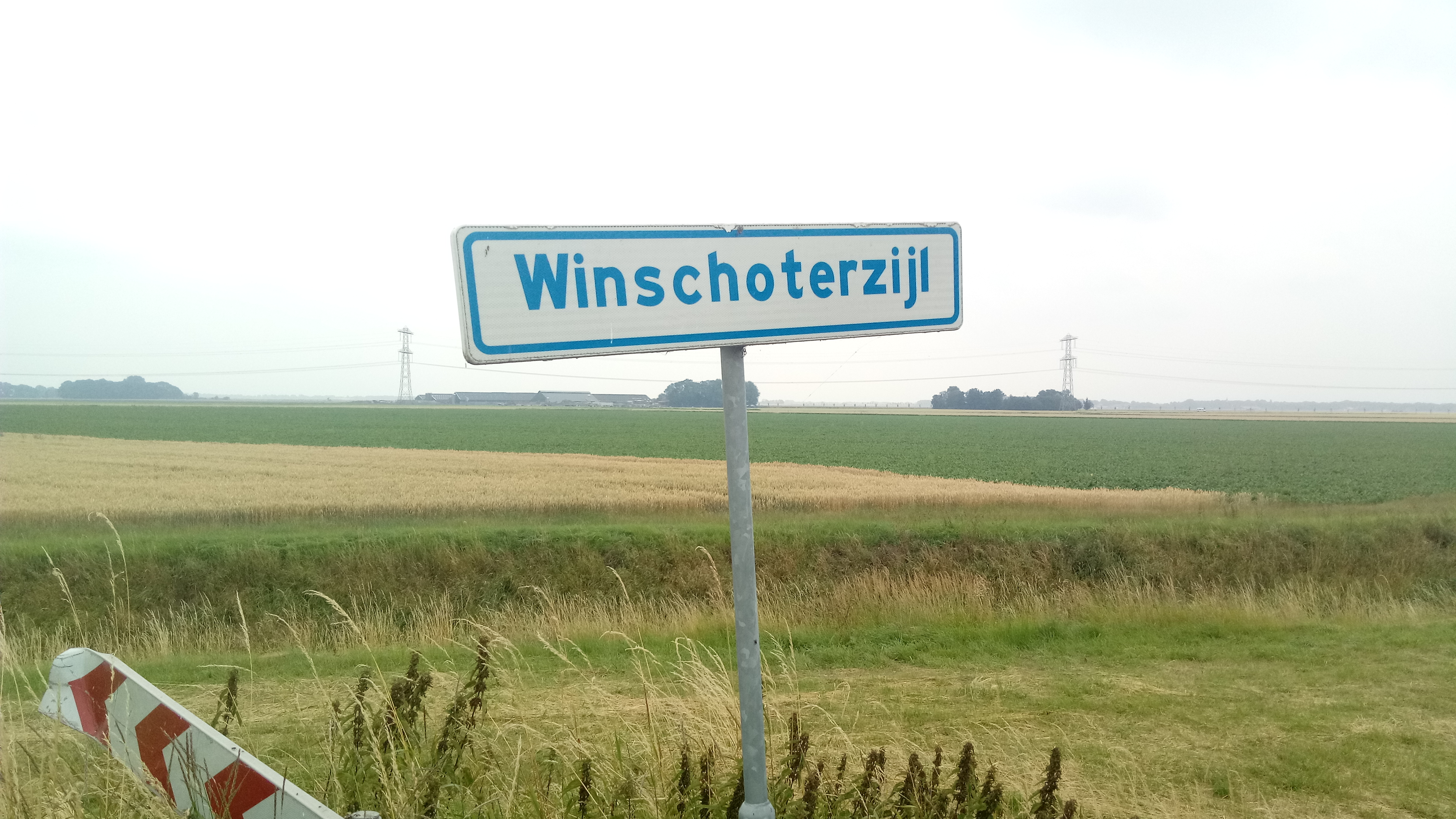
City limit sign placed by Bellingwedde in 2013

The lock is still present and called Winschoterzijl. Even though the hamlet has been disestablished, there are a couple of farms left. In 2013, the municipality of Bellingwedde placed a city limits sign at the remaining part of Winschoterzijl in their municipality. There is also a street sign in Winschoten giving directions to Winschoterzijl, however there is no sign to inform you that you've reached the hamlet. One of the farms is named Landgoed Winschoterzijl, and offers a camping.
