= De Olde Molen =

Octagonal windmill in Bubali, Aruba

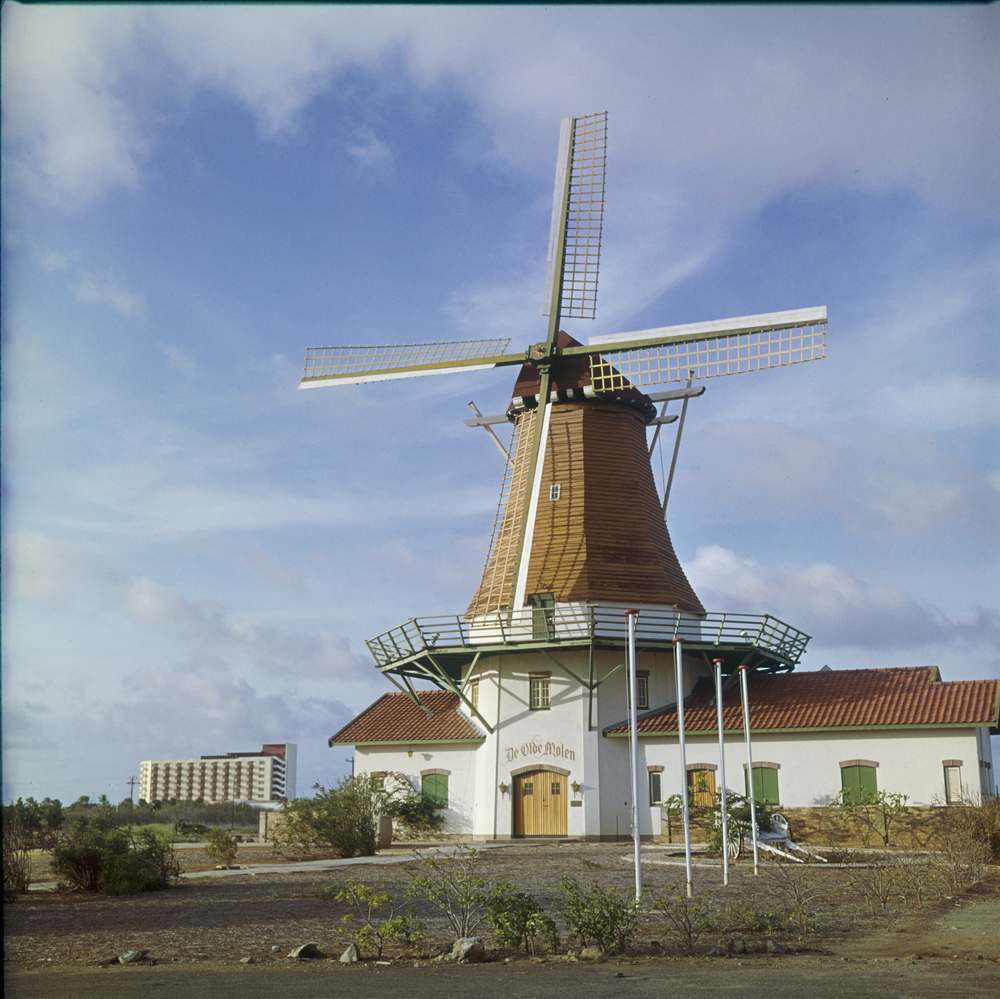
- De Olde Molen (1964) with the sails installed correctly, counterclockwise, and with the correct length of 77foot (before "restoration" in 1973).

Origin
- Mill location: Bubali, Aruba
- Coordinates: Aruba: 12.56321°N 70.04727°W; Groningen: 53.085690°N 7.066360°E
- Year built: 1815

Information
- Purpose: Restaurant (1962–); Gristmill (1897–1939); Windpump (1815–1883)
- Type: Smock mill
- Smock sides: 8
- No. of sails: 4
- Type of sails: Common sails

De Olde Molen (/də ˈoʊld ˈmoʊlən/ duh OLD-uh MOH-luhn), also known as Old Dutch Windmill, The Mill, or Alte Mühle is a non-operational octagonal smock mill with a stage (elevated platform) reconstructed in 1961 in Bubali, Aruba. Since then, it has been serving as a restaurant and a windmill museum.

Originally, this windmill has undergone various relocations and transformations within the province of the Netherlands, Groningen, before arriving at its present location.

== History ==
=== The Netherlands ===
==== Winschoterzijl ====
In 1804 and in 1810, two polder mills (watermill driven by wind) were built at Polder Reiderland (5th division of Blijham) near Winschoterzijl. The younger of the two burned down in 1814. Subsequently, in 1815, a mill was constructed on that same spot, featuring two screw pumps and a wingspan of 77 ft (23 metres), which is now located in Aruba. In 1883, it was sold to a Geert Rikus Luth for one-hundred guilders and later came into ownership of the Snelter family. In 1897, it was relocated to Wedderveer.

==== Wedderveer ====
On behalf of miller Jan Hubbeling Snelter, the mill underwent reconstruction in 1898 by millwright W. Kamps from Winschoten, following the permit granted in 1896. On 28 January 1898, the mill became operational, (Note: Mulder Snelter noted in pencil on one of the thick trusses that this was done on behalf of Jan Siks and Jan Korte in Hoorn.) serving as a wind-powered gristmill. Known as Molen van Snelter or Molen van Jonker, this gristmill stood opposite a small wind-powered sawmill, Spinnenkop.

The Molen van Snelter was an octagonal smock mill with a tar paper roof and cap, featuring a low stage with a stone base (i.e. middle and bottom sections). The mill had two wooden rods connected to a cast iron axle, and its sails were rigged in the traditional Dutch sail system, known as commons sails. Inside, it had two pairs of millstones on the stone floor.

In April 1930, the mill was left with only one rod (two sails) after a rod broke in May 1929. Repairs were carried out in 1933, but the mill was later neglected, with a partial stage in the southwest, a missing tail, and tie beam. Grinding operations ceased in 1937. By 1947, both rods (all four sails) were missing, and a demolition permit was issued to H.G. Jonker in Wedde on 2 October 1958.

In 1960, two Dutch businessmen, Theo Paalman and G.J. Woudenberg, acquired the mill with the intention of relocating it to Aruba as a tourist attraction. The meticulous disassembly of the Molen van Jonker by millwright Jan Diederik Medendorp began in the same year and took four weeks, with the blades being left intact. The original stone base remained in the Netherlands, while a new one was constructed in Aruba to accommodate the restaurant. Notably, the spoorwiel (great spur wheel) and rondsel (pinion) are housed in the gristmill De Zwaan in Holland, Michigan, USA. The bents, windmill mechanisms, and also 2,000 kilograms (4,400 lb) of millstones, totaling 30 tons of load, were transported by the KNSM ship, m.s. Breda, to commence the reconstruction in Aruba.

==== Harkstede and Onderdendam ====
The polder mill in Harkstede, named De Verloren Zoon ("The Lost Son"), also known as Polder Het Lageland ("Polder The Low Land"), demolished in 1957, contributed the great spur wheel and a pinion to De Olde Molen in Aruba.

Similarly, another polder mill in Onderdendam, named Onderwierumer Molen (Onderwierumer mill), was purchased for two-hundred guilders and demolished in 1958. This mill donated the bovenwiel (brake wheel) and bonkelaar (wallower) to Aruba.

=== Aruba ===
==== Bubali ====
The reconstruction efforts received a symbolic start in March 1961 when Lieutenant Governor F.J.C. Beaujon (1959–1963) placed the first stone. The entire rebuilding process was overseen by millwright J.D. Medendorp. It was constructed by Bohama NV with H. van Strien as head engineer. De Olde Molen was weatherboarded with a new six-meter-elevated wooden stage surrounding the base of the mill. By March 1962, construction was complete and since September of that year, it has served as a restaurant. After the seven-week reconstruction, the intention was to put the sails in commission. However, due to the strong trade winds, the sails were fixed into place to protect against damage. The acquisition, transportation, reconstruction, and establishment of the restaurant collectively required over 175,000 Netherlands Antillean guilders, a sum that was raised in Aruba through the incorporation of the De Olde Molen NV.

In 1965, De Olde Molen restaurant reopened under new management by Karel Schmand and W.A. Strijland, who also managed the floating Bali restaurant in Oranjestad. The restaurant had been closed for the past one-and-a-half years due to financial difficulties. In 1973, Joseph Patterson acquired De Olde Molen from K. Schmand and embarked on an extensive restoration project for the windmill. He also adorned the restaurant with furniture and paintings dating from the 9th to the 18th century. In the interior, there are still inscriptions that recall the different previous owners of the mill in the Netherlands. However, in 2001, when Medendorp returned to Aruba, he expressed disappointment upon discovering that the sails had been incorrectly attached and were also too short during the restoration. Consequently, the mill rotates clockwise, whereas traditional Dutch windmills typically turn counterclockwise.

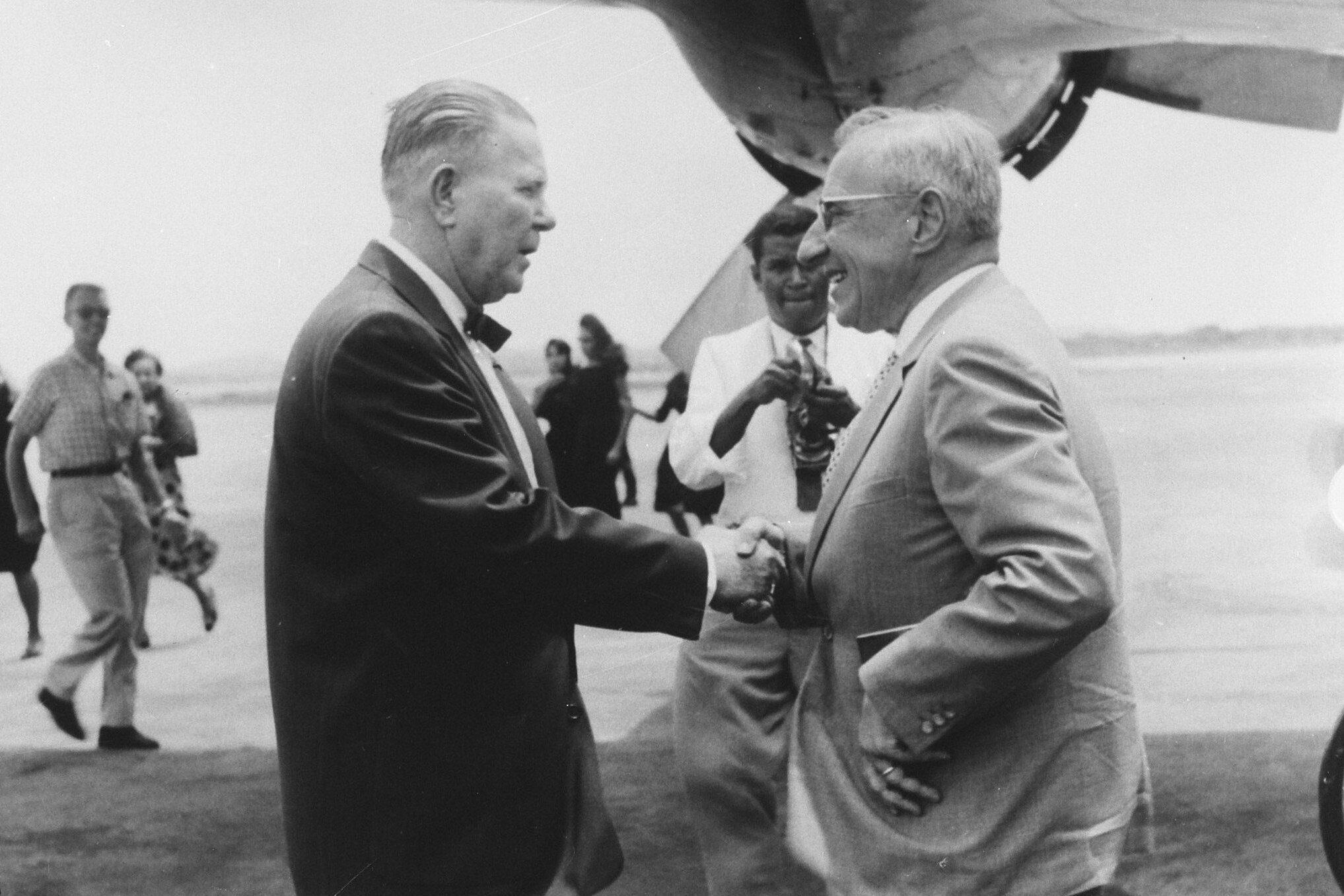
left to right: Lieutenant Governor F.J.C. Beaujon and Jan de Quay

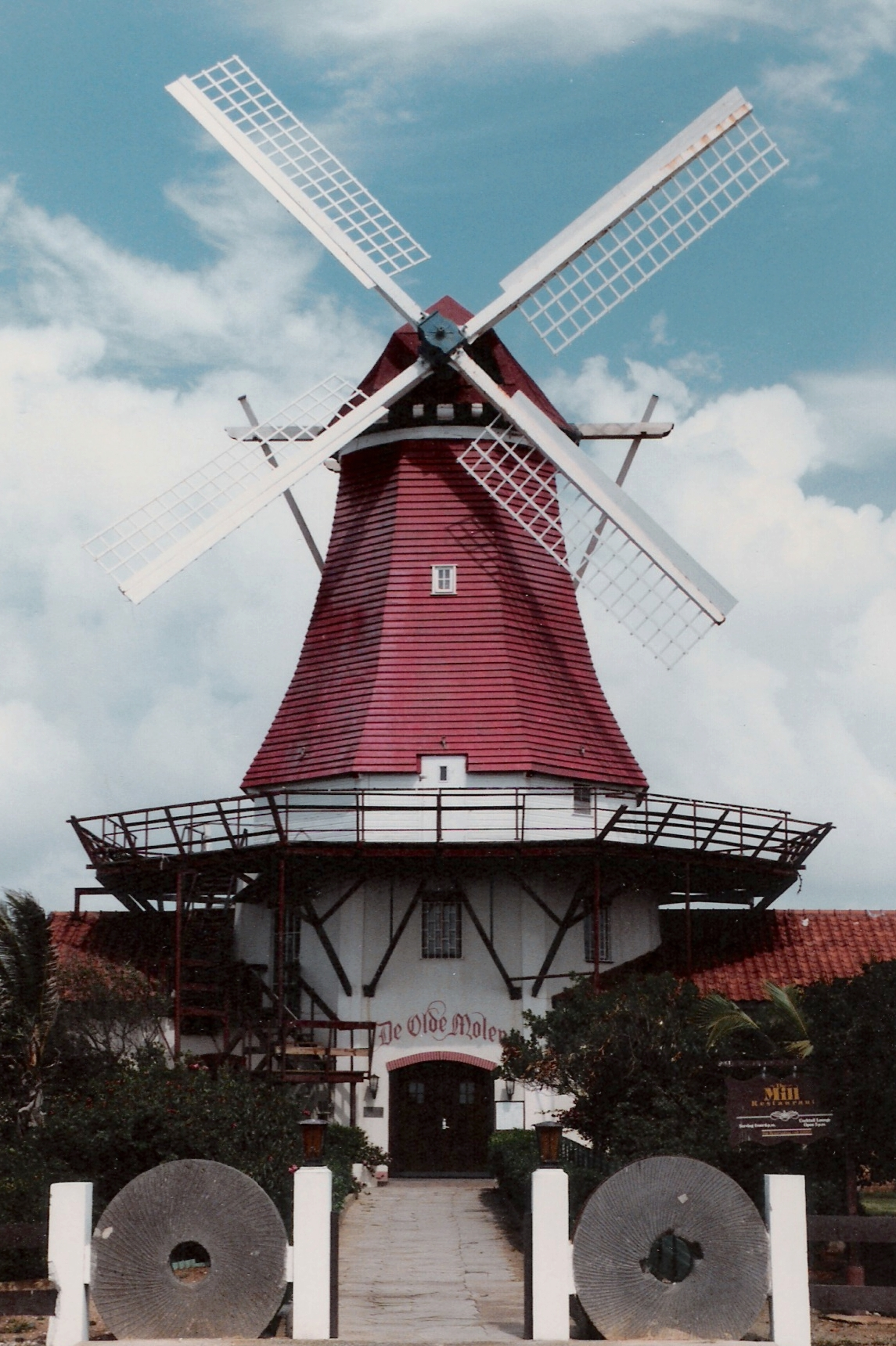
Short sails and still installed counterclockwise (1955–1985)

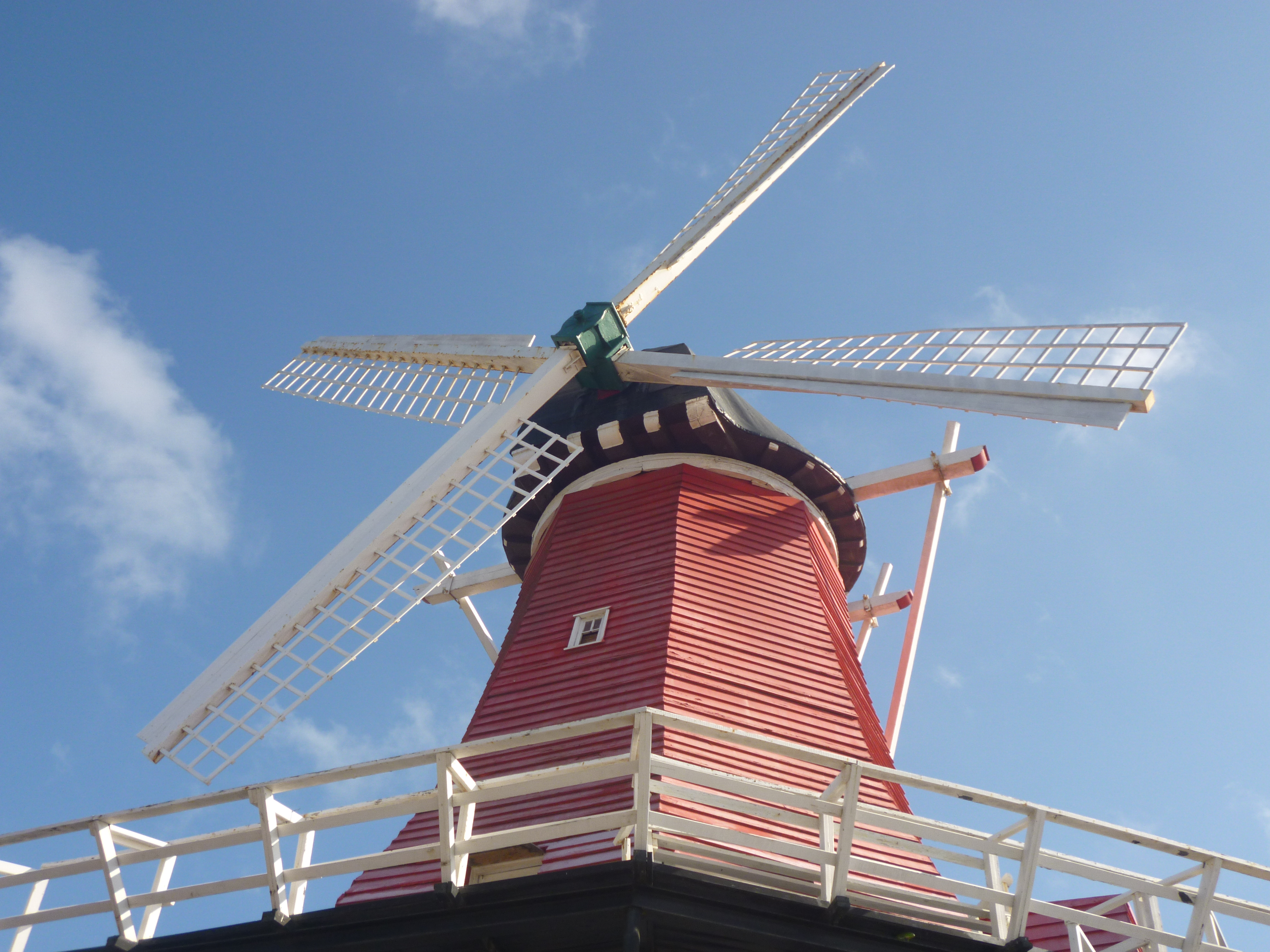
The sails installed incorrectly, clockwise, and too short. (2013)
