= Jan de Boer (gymnast) =

Dutch gymnast (1859–1941)

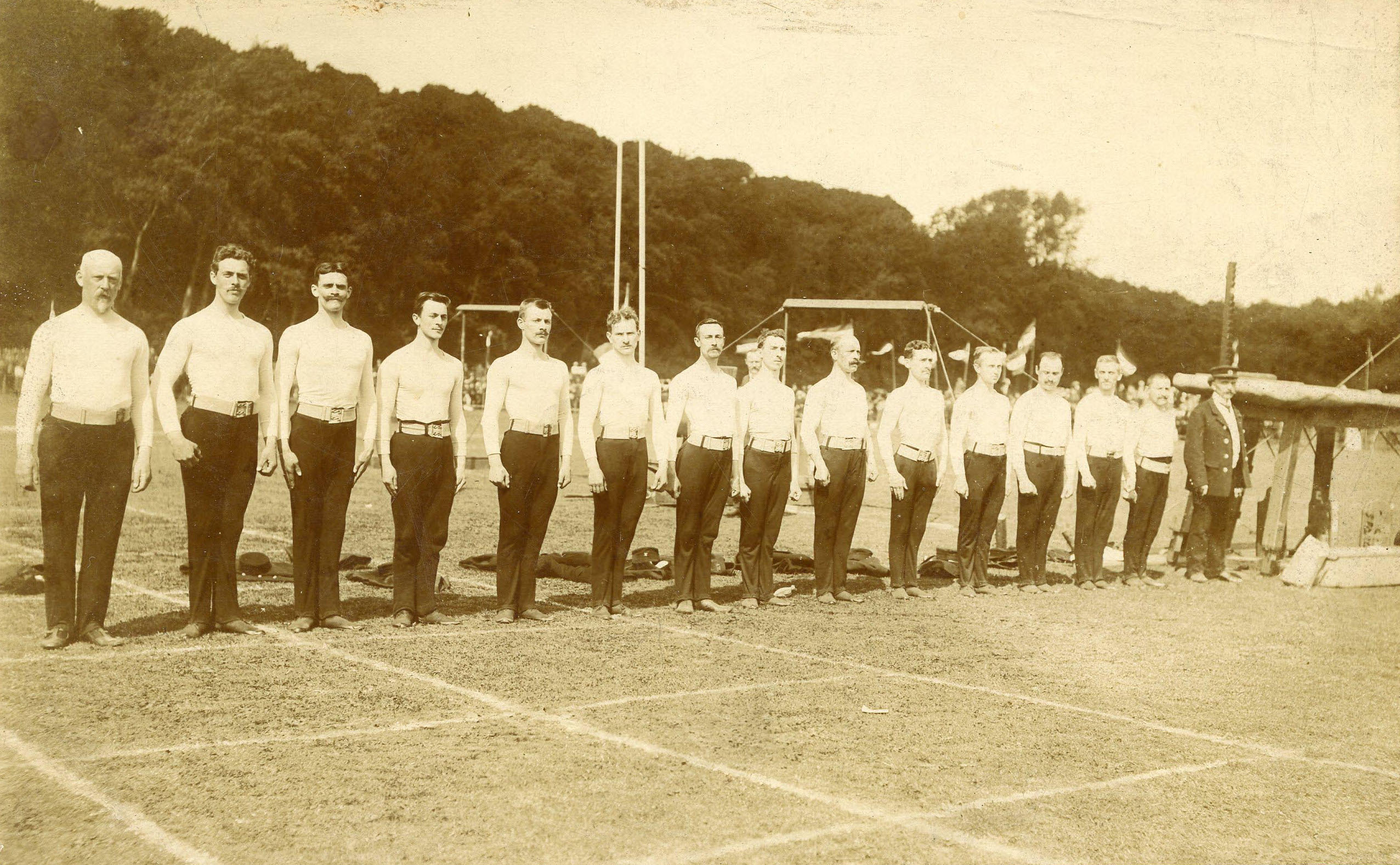
- de Boer, left, at the 1908 Summer Olympics

Personal information
- Born: 15 February 1859 Nieuwe Pekela, Netherlands
- Died: 8 June 1941 (aged 82) Amsterdam, Netherlands

Gymnastics career
- Discipline: Men's artistic gymnastics
- Country represented: Netherlands

Jan de Boer (15 February 1859 in Nieuwe Pekela – 8 June 1941 in Amsterdam) was a Dutch gymnast who competed in the 1908 Summer Olympics. He carried the flag for the Netherlands at the Olympic Opening Ceremonies in London.

He was part of the Dutch gymnastics team, which finished seventh in the team event.

Olympic Games
Preceded by inaugural	Flagbearer for Netherlands; London 1908	Succeeded by J. Ploeger
