= Dollart =

Bay in the Wadden Sea between Netherlands and Germany

- Dollard
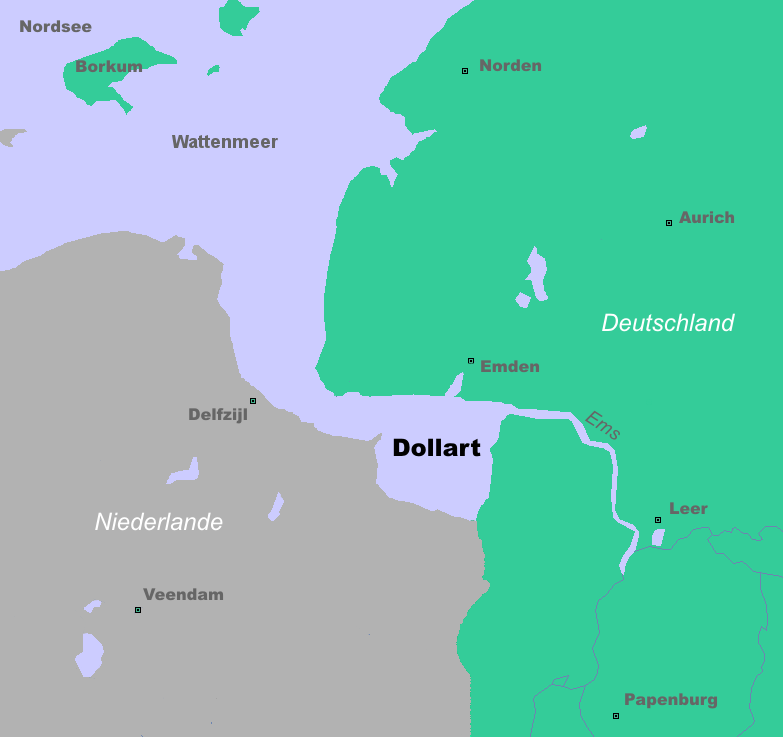
- The Dollart and surrounding area

- Location of the Dollart Dollart (Lower Saxony) Dollart (North Sea)
- Location: Lower Saxony, Germany / Groningen, Netherlands
- Group: Wadden Sea
- Coordinates: 53.29°N 7.16°E
- Type: Tidal bay
- Etymology: Possibly from Middle Dutch dole ("deep pit")
- Part of: Ems estuary
- Primary inflows: Westerwoldse Aa
- River sources: Ems (via tidal exchange)
- Primary outflows: Wadden Sea
- Ocean/sea sources: North Sea
- Basin countries: Germany, Netherlands
- Max. length: 10 km (6.2 mi)
- Max. width: 9 km (5.6 mi)
- Surface area: 100 km^{2} (39 sq mi)
- Average depth: Approx. 2.5 m (8 ft 2 in) (average tidal range)
- Max. depth: Approx. 10 m (33 ft) (in tidal channels)
- Residence time: Tidal
- Salinity: Brackish
- Surface elevation: Sea level
- Frozen: No
- Islands: None
- Settlements: Emden, Delfzijl, Eemshaven
- Website: groningerlandschap.nl

The Dollart (German name, pronounced [ˈdɔlaʁt]) or Dollard (Dutch name, pronounced [ˈdɔlɑrt]) is a bay in the south‑eastern Wadden Sea at the Germany–Netherlands border, west of the Ems estuary. It forms the innermost part of the Ems–Dollart estuarine system and is characterised by extensive intertidal flats, salt marshes and shallow channels. A large proportion of the surface falls dry at low tide, creating internationally important feeding grounds for migratory shorebirds and waterfowl. The remaining unembanked forelands belong to the transnational Wadden Sea World Heritage Site.

== Name ==
The toponym appears in late‑fifteenth‑century sources as Dollard/Dullert. A contemporary dossier from the Aduard monastery (c. 1485) and a notice by the Groningen rector Wilhelmus Frederici (1498/99) are among the earliest mentions. The origin of the name is uncertain. A plausible explanation derives it from Middle Dutch dole/dole in the sense of a "large pit, pool" (hence "deep, excavated water"), alternatively "grave/pit of the dead"; popular early‑modern writers instead connected it with the "furious nature" (Dutch: dolle aard) of the sea in this area, a view paraphrased by Ubbo Emmius around 1600 as "from the rage of its waves" (a fluctuum rabie). The related form Dullaert/Dollaert is also attested historically for other sea inlets, such as the Braakman in Zeeland.

== Geography ==
The Dollart lies south of the seaport city of Emden (Germany) and north‑east of Delfzijl and Eemshaven (Netherlands). Its mouth, the Dollartmond, opens to the north‑west between the Dutch headland Punt van Reide and the tidal flat known as the Geise that separates the Dollart's channel system from the Emden fairway of the Ems. From north to south the bay is about 9 km wide. Its present‑day surface area is about 100 km^{2}, of which the larger share is intertidal; on the Dutch side alone, c. 9,100 ha is open tidal area and c. 1,050 ha consists of salt‑marsh forelands. The German portion is partly included in the Lower Saxony Wadden Sea National Park.

Freshwater enters principally from the Westerwoldse Aa, which debouches at Nieuwe Statenzijl through the Buiten‑Aa and Schanskerdiep into the main channel, the Groote Gat; another important channel is the Kerkeriet. The tidal range in the bay averages around 3 m, with values rising seaward from c.2.6 m near the Eemshaven. The water is brackish, with strong spatial and seasonal salinity gradients.

To stabilise the Emden fairway and prevent a southward shift of the Ems, German authorities from 1872 onward built a system of groynes, separation and guiding works along the Geise (Geise Leitdamm). These training structures concentrated the tidal flow near the north shore and deepened the Emden channel; as a consequence, most tidal exchange between the bay and the Ems takes place through the narrow Dollart mouth west of Punt van Reide.

== Formation and reclamation ==
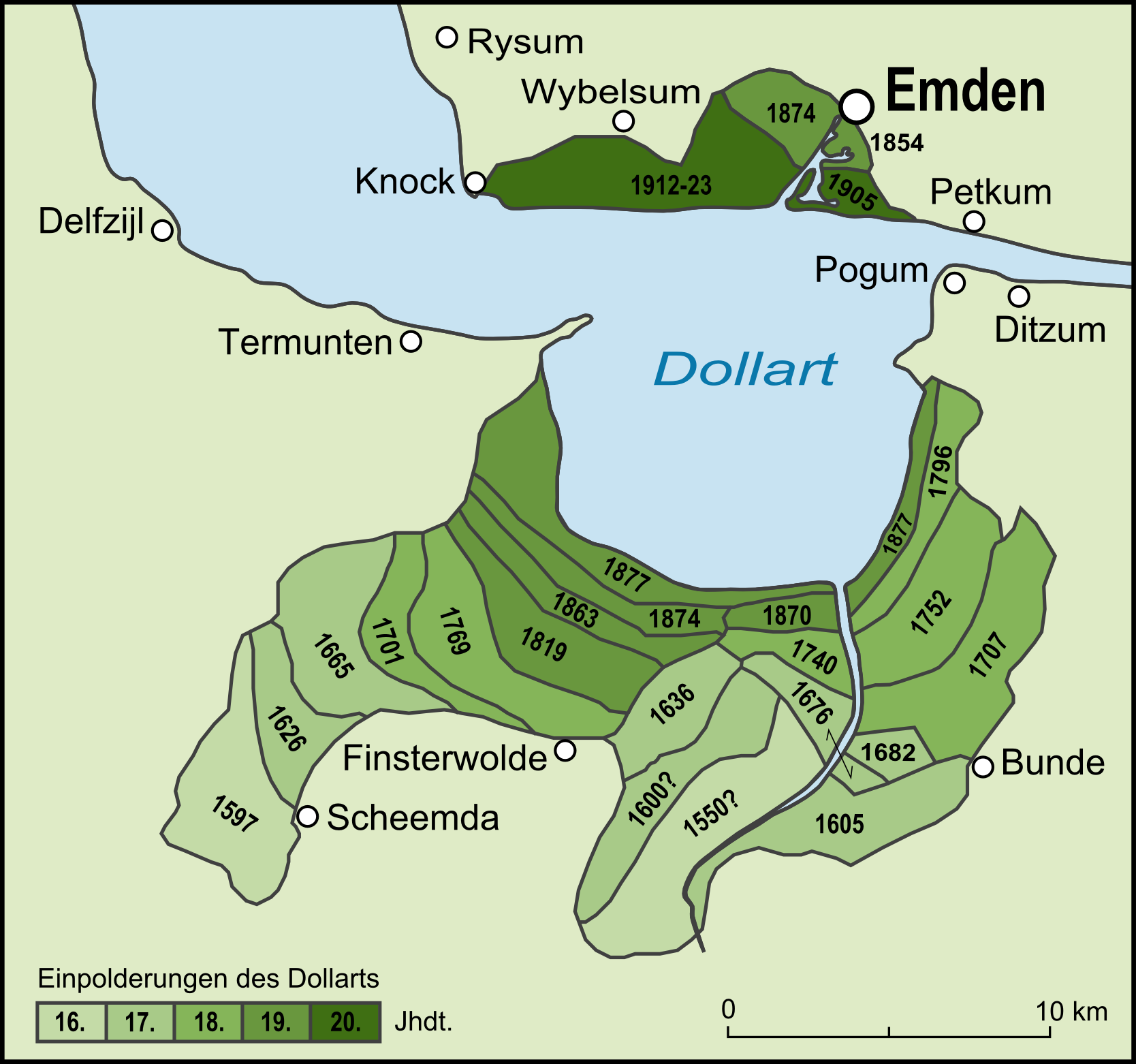
Recovery of the fringes of the Dollart: polders on the German (right and top) and Dutch (left and bottom) sides

The Dollart originated gradually during the later Middle Ages through a combination of peat excavation and oxidation, soil subsidence, bank erosion and repeated storm surges that progressively converted a low‑lying peat and clay landscape into an estuarine basin. Earlier scholarship placed the catastrophe in 1277 or connected it with the Marcellus flood of 1362, but historical and geological studies indicate a much more protracted process with stepwise enlargements. Archaeology shows that freshwater conditions persisted inland near Bad Nieuweschans, Vriescheloo and Scheemda into the fifteenth century, whereas salt‑tolerant vegetation already characterised the Pogum area on the German side in the thirteenth century.

A decisive enlargement occurred during the Cosmas and Damian flood of 1509, which drove the sea far inland. Contemporary and early‑modern sources speak of more than thirty settlements lost; the East Frisian chronicler Eggerik Beninga reported twenty‑four, likely closer to the truth. By around 1520 the bay had reached its maximum extent, commonly estimated at 340–350 km^{2}. Well‑known drowned places include Oosterreide and Westerreide, Fletum, Torum and the Premonstratensian monastery of Palmar (Porta Sanctae Mariae).

From the sixteenth century onward, both shores undertook extensive land reclamation. By means of dikes and polders roughly two‑thirds of the inundated area was recovered between the sixteenth and twentieth centuries. On the German side the last major enclosure was the Kanalpolder (1877); on the Dutch side, the Johannes Kerkhovenpolder (1878), the Carel Coenraadpolder (1924) and the Polder Breebaart (completed 1979). Polder Breebaart was ultimately developed as a nature reserve and, upon opening in 2001, became the first managed inland tidal area in the Netherlands.

== Environment and conservation ==
The Dollart's extensive intertidal flats and salt marshes support rich benthic microphytobenthos and invertebrate communities that feed large numbers of waders and waterfowl along the East Atlantic Flyway. The Dutch sector alone comprises c. 9,057 ha of open tidal area and 1,057 ha of salt marshes; the forelands on the German shore add several hundred hectares. The area is designated as a Ramsar site as part of the 121,620‑ha Wattenmeer, Ostfriesisches Wattenmeer & Dollart (listed 1976; on the Montreux Record since 1990), as Birds Directive and Habitats Directive sites, and—on the German shore—within the core zones of the Lower Saxony Wadden Sea National Park. In 2009 the transboundary Wadden Sea was inscribed on the World Heritage List for its outstanding biodiversity and geomorphological processes.

High suspended‑sediment concentrations and persistent turbidity are long‑recognised ecological pressures in the Ems–Dollart system. Following construction and commissioning of the Emssperrwerk (Ems Barrier) at Gandersum in 2002—built for storm‑surge protection and to facilitate ship transfers from the Meyer Werft yard—Germany and the Netherlands agreed to develop a joint "ecological strategy for sediment management" to reduce the silt surplus, improve ecological status and increase climate resilience. On the Dutch shore, the Brede Groene Dijk (Broad Green Dike) pilot near Nieuwe Statenzijl demonstrates climate‑resilient dike reinforcement using clay produced from locally harvested estuarine silt; in 2022 some 70,000 m^{3} of matured clay was applied to strengthen a 750‑m dike section, with further roll‑out planned after 2025.

== Administration and use ==
Large parts of the Dutch intertidal area are owned by Natuurmonumenten and managed by Het Groninger Landschap; the latter also manages the Dollard foreland marshes, the Punt van Reide headland and Polder Breebaart. On the German side the coastline belongs to the Landkreis Leer and the municipality of Jemgum; nature conservation is framed by the National Park and EU designations. Ports at Emden, Delfzijl and Eemshaven handle sea and inland shipping. The historical protection of the Emden fairway by the Geise training works continues to shape navigation. A seasonal passenger ferry Dollard connects Ditzum, Emden and Delfzijl and forms the keystone of the cross‑border cycling route Internationale Dollard Route.

== Border dispute ==
The long‑standing maritime boundary dispute in the Dollart/Ems region

The precise maritime boundary through the Dollart and the outer Ems has never been definitively delimited. Both states maintain conflicting legal positions but have preferred pragmatic cooperation to adjudication. On 8 April 1960 the Netherlands and the Federal Republic of Germany concluded the Ems-Dollart Treaty, which organised navigation, fisheries and administrative cooperation in the estuary while leaving sovereignty claims unaffected.

In 2011 the issue gained practical prominence when Germany issued permits for the Riffgat offshore wind farm within the 12‑nautical‑mile zone, an area affected by the differing claims. A second bilateral agreement was signed on 24 October 2014 to regulate "use and management" of the territorial sea between 3 and 12 nautical miles by reference to a functional line; the treaty expressly states that it is not a boundary settlement and preserves both parties' positions. Media reports at the time described the dispute as "ended", but the agreement does not demarcate sovereignty.

== Cultural history ==
Seventeenth‑century maps by Ubbo Emmius (1630, after Jacob van der Meersch, 1574) depict the drowned villages of the Dollart. The loss of Reiderland in particular entered regional memory; folklore speaks of bells still ringing beneath the waves. In the twentieth century, the never‑built Dollarthafen deep‑water port proposed for Emden (1970s–1980s) became a focus of cross‑border environmental activism and intergovernmental negotiation; the project was abandoned in 1988 on economic grounds. Today the area is a centre for nature‑based recreation; the Kiekkaaste bird hide near Nieuwe Statenzijl—standing outside the sea dike on the border—is a well‑known vantage point over the marshes and tidal flats.

== See also ==
Ems Dollart Region (EDR), a Dutch–German euroregion founded in 1977
