= Deaths in July 2008 =

The following is a list of notable deaths in July 2008.

Entries for each day are listed alphabetically by surname. A typical entry lists information in the following sequence:

- Name, age, country of citizenship at birth, subsequent country of citizenship (if applicable), reason for notability, cause of death (if known), and reference.

== July 2008 ==
=== 1 ===
- Abdullahi Afrah, 55, Somalian Islamist, shot.
- Aleksei Argun, 71, Abkhazian politician.
- Keith Charles, 74, American actor (As the World Turns, The Royal Tenenbaums, Drop Dead Fred), lung cancer.
- Clay Felker, 82, American editor and journalist (New York magazine), throat cancer.
- Mel Galley, 60, British guitarist (Trapeze, Whitesnake, Phenomena), esophageal cancer.
- Mogens Glistrup, 82, Danish politician, lawyer and founder of the Progress Party.
- Robert Harling, 98, British typographer.
- Dejan Medaković, 85, Serbian writer, historian, professor, president of Academy of Sciences and Arts (1999–2003).
- Sir Richard Morris, 82, British industrialist.
- Jean-Pierre Muller, 83, French Olympic fencer.
- John Pont, 80, American college football coach.
- Mark Dean Schwab, 39, American murderer, execution by lethal injection.

=== 2 ===
- Chris Arlman, 64, Dutch politician, heart attack.
- Glencairn Balfour Paul, 90, British diplomat.
- Omar Caetano, 69, Uruguayan football player.
- Abdel Wahab El-Messiri, 70, Egyptian scholar and politician, cancer.
- Joe Nhlanhla, 71, South African politician, minister of Intelligence Services (1999–2001).
- Simone Ortega, 89, Spanish culinary author.
- Natasha Shneider, 52, Russian-born American actress (2010: The Year We Make Contact) and musician (Eleven), cancer.
- Elizabeth Spriggs, 78, British actress (Sense and Sensibility, Harry Potter and the Philosopher's Stone, Shine on Harvey Moon).

=== 3 ===
- M. C. Ahamed, 77, Sri Lankan politician.
- Sue Alexander, 74, American writer of children's literature.
- Dan Cook, 81, American journalist (San Antonio Express-News, KENS-TV).
- Ernie Cooksey, 28, British footballer (Oldham Athletic, Grays Athletic), melanoma.
- Larry Harmon, 83, American entertainer (Bozo the Clown), heart failure.
- Harald Heide-Steen Jr., 68, Norwegian actor and comedian, lung cancer.
- Clive Hornby, 63, British actor (Emmerdale), cancer.
- Kat Kinkade, 77, American co-founder of Twin Oaks Community, cancer.
- Annabelle Lee, 86, American baseball player (All-American Girls Professional Baseball League).
- Thomas Orley, 74, American Olympic fencer.
- Dave Powers, 74, American television director (Three's Company, The Carol Burnett Show, Mama's Family), four-time Emmy winner, skin cancer.
- Oliver Schroer, 53, Canadian fiddler, leukemia.
- John Sedwick, 79, American television director.

=== 4 ===
- Alfred Arteaga, 58, American Chicano poet, heart attack.
- Thomas M. Disch, 68, American science fiction author (Camp Concentration, The Brave Little Toaster), suicide by gunshot.
- Jesse Helms, 86, American politician, senator from North Carolina (1973–2003), natural causes.
- Evelyn Keyes, 91, American actress (Gone With the Wind), uterine cancer.
- Terrence Kiel, 27, American football player (San Diego Chargers), car crash.
- Wayne Pai, 55, Taiwanese businessman, founding chairman of Polaris Group, suicide.
- Agneta Prytz, 91, Swedish actress, wife of Gösta Folke.
- Janwillem van de Wetering, 77, Dutch writer.
- Sir Charles Wheeler, 85, British journalist, longest serving BBC foreign correspondent, lung cancer.

=== 5 ===
- Pieter Bogaers, 84, Dutch politician of the Catholic People's Party (KVP).
- Hasan Doğan, 52, Turkish president of the national football federation, cardiac arrest.
- René Harris, 60, Nauruan president (1999–2000, 2001–2003, 2003, 2003–2004), cardiac arrest.
- Dagfinn Næss, 74, Norwegian Olympic boxer.
- Thích Huyền Quang, 88, Vietnamese religious leader, supreme patriarch of the Unified Buddhist Church of Vietnam.

=== 6 ===
- Bob Ackles, 69, Canadian executive for the Canadian Football League's BC Lions, heart attack.
- George Ambo, 85, Papua New Guinean Archbishop.
- Jack Collins, 78, Australian footballer, premiership winner with Footscray (1954), heart attack.
- Bobby Durham, 71, American jazz drummer.
- Ambuya Mlambo, 84, Zimbabwean radio and television presenter, cancer.
- Nonna Mordyukova, 82, Russian actress, diabetes.
- Mando Ramos, 59, American former WBC and WBA World lightweight champion boxer.
- George Tibbits, 74, Australian architect and composer.

=== 7 ===
- Sultana bint Abdulaziz Al Saud, 80, Saudi sister of King Abdullah.
- Larry H. Abraham, 70, American businessman and author.
- Ralph Ackerman, 67, American photographer, producer, traveler and lecturer.
- Donald Allen, 81, Australian cricketer.
- Bruce Conner, 74, American artist, natural causes.
- Bruce Dalling, 69, South African yachtsman, heart attack.
- Yitzchok Dovid Groner, 83, Australian Chabad rabbi.
- Lear Fan, 27, American-bred, British-trained Thoroughbred racehorse and sire, natural causes.
- Dorian Leigh, 91, American fashion model (Revlon), sister of Suzy Parker, Alzheimer's disease.
- Clem McSpadden, 82, American politician, congressman from Oklahoma (1973–1975), cancer.
- Hugh Mendl, 88, British record producer.
- Giovanni Viola, 82, Italian football goalkeeper, natural causes.
- Fred Yates, 85, British painter.

=== 8 ===
- Alex d'Arbeloff, 80, American entrepreneur.
- Wieńczysław Gliński, 87, Polish actor.
- Erling Rønneberg, 84, Norwegian resistance trainer and politician, mayor of Ski (1958–1990).
- Sir John Templeton, 95, British businessman and philanthropist, pneumonia.
- Sir Anthony Troup, 86, British vice-admiral.

=== 9 ===
- Séamus Brennan, 60, Irish politician, prostate cancer.
- Wim de Beer, 75, Dutch field hockey player.
- Don Eaddy, 74, American sportsman.
- Elizabeth Fabac, 86, American baseball player (AAGPBL)
- Charles H. Joffe, 78, American film producer (Annie Hall, Match Point, Hannah and Her Sisters), Oscar winner (1978), after long illness.
- Sherman Lee, 90, American director of the Cleveland Museum of Art (1958–1983).
- J. Murdoch Ritchie, 83, American biophysicist.
- John West, 84, Australian broadcaster and theatre historian.

=== 10 ===
- Rocky Aoki, 69, Japanese-born American founder of Benihana restaurants, pneumonia.
- Bernard Cahier, 81, French Formula One photojournalist.
- Robert M. DeHaven, 86, American flying ace and test pilot.
- Don Devitt, 86, Australian politician.
- Archie McCardell, 81, American business executive (Xerox, International Harvester).
- Steve Mingori, 64, American baseball player (Kansas City Royals), natural causes.
- Ayub Ommaya, 78, Pakistani neurosurgeon, Alzheimer's disease.
- William W. Robertson, 66, American lawyer.
- Mike Souchak, 81, American golfer, complications of heart attack.
- Ahmad Suradji, 57, Indonesian serial killer, execution by firing squad.
- Yoji Totsuka, 66, Japanese particle physicist, colorectal cancer.
- Vindication, 8, American champion racehorse, euthanized.

=== 11 ===
- Mahmood Ali, 79–80, Pakistani artist, cardiac arrest.
- Joe Barr, 63, American editor and writer.
- Michael DeBakey, 99, American cardiovascular surgeon and medical pioneer, natural causes.
- Roy M. Huffington, 90, American oilman, diplomat and philanthropist, natural causes.
- James H. Humphrey, 97, American physical education educator and researcher.
- Iswadi Idris, 60, Indonesian football player and coach.
- Mike Kleinhenz, 56, American voice actor, heart attack.
- Breno Mello, 76, Brazilian actor (Black Orpheus) and footballer.
- Chuck Stobbs, 79, American baseball pitcher, cancer.

=== 12 ===
- Patricia Buckley Bozell, 81, American founder of Catholic journal Triumph, wife of L. Brent Bozell Jr., throat cancer.
- Reinhard Fabisch, 57, German football manager, cancer.
- Virginia B. MacDonald, 87, American politician, member of the Illinois House of Representatives and Illinois State Senate.
- Bobby Murcer, 62, American baseball player and sportscaster (New York Yankees), brain cancer.
- Earl Lee Nelson, 79, American R&B singer (Bob & Earl, The Hollywood Flames, Jackie Lee), Alzheimer's disease.
- Olive Riley, 108, Australian woman believed to be the world's oldest blogger, natural causes.
- Tony Snow, 53, American White House press secretary (2006–2007), Fox News presenter, colon cancer.
- Tsay Jaw-yang, 67, Taiwanese politician, minister of Transportation and Communications, pneumonia.

=== 13 ===
- Nicolas Arroyo, 90, Cuban architect, diplomat and minister.
- Les Crane, 74, American talk show host, Grammy Award winner ("Desiderata").
- Peter Durack, 81, Australian senator and attorney-general (1977–1983).
- Red Foley, 79, American sportswriter and baseball official scorer.
- Bronisław Geremek, 76, Polish social historian and politician, minister of Foreign Affairs (1997–2000), car accident.
- John Raymond Hobbs, 79, British physician, lung cancer.
- John Mabuku, Namibian politician, governor of Caprivi Region, supporter of Caprivi Strip secessionist movement.
- Dave Ricketts, 73, American baseball player and coach (St. Louis Cardinals), renal cancer.
- Dona Spring, 55, American disability rights activist and Green politician, Berkeley city councilor since 1992, rheumatoid arthritis.
- Gerald Wiggins, 86, American jazz pianist.

=== 14 ===
- Miguel Benavides, 68, Cuban actor.
- Y. V. Chandrachud, 88, Indian jurist, Chief Justice (1978–1985).
- Bryan Cowgill, 81, British television executive.
- Henki Kolstad, 93, Norwegian actor.
- Luke Kruytbosch, 47, American race caller, natural causes.
- Teta Lando, 60, Angolan musician, cancer.
- Hugh Lloyd, 85, British actor (Hancock's Half Hour).
- George Noakes, 83, Welsh Anglican prelate, Archbishop of Wales (1987–1991).
- Ong Chit Chung, 59, Singaporean politician.
- Katie Reider, 30, American singer and songwriter, cerebral hemorrhage and cancer.
- Riek Schagen, 94, Dutch actress and artist.
- Mike Schutte, 57, South African boxer, cancer.
- Steven Thomas, 36, American entrepreneur missing since 30 June, fall from Pali Lookout. (body discovered on this date)

=== 15 ===
- Peter Ala Adjetey, 76, Ghanaian lawyer and politician.
- Ahmad Basri Akil, 69, Malaysian football manager.
- György Kolonics, 36, Hungarian Olympic canoeing gold medallist (1996, 2000), heart failure.
- Yuri Mikhaylov, 77, Russian speed skater.
- Gionata Mingozzi, 23, Italian footballer (Treviso F.B.C. 1993), car accident.
- Derek W. Moore, 77, British mathematician.
- Steve Peterson, 58, American NASCAR technical director, natural causes.
- Tang Aoqing, 92, Chinese chemist, President of Jilin University (1978–1986).
- Karl Unterkircher, 37, Italian mountaineer and explorer, fall on Nanga Parbat.
- Gennadi Volnov, 68, Russian basketball player for Soviet Union, 1972 Olympic gold medallist.

=== 16 ===
- Sir Eric Dunn, 80, British air marshal.
- Roger Landes, 91, British Special Operations Executive agent.
- Sherman Maxwell, 100, American Negro league baseball sportscaster.
- Peanuts O'Flaherty, 90, Canadian ice hockey player.
- Jo Stafford, 90, American traditional pop singer ("You Belong to Me"), heart failure.
- Lindsay Thompson, 84, Australian politician, premier of Victoria (1981–1982), pneumonia.

=== 17 ===
- Lila T. Abaunza, 79, Nicaraguan first lady (2002–2007), wife of President Enrique Bolaños.
- Giorgio Ceragioli, 78, Italian engineer, professor and a leader in the pro-Third World movement, Parkinson's disease.
- Creig Flessel, 96, American comic book artist.
- Johny Fonck, 87, Luxembourgish Olympic athlete.
- Larry Haines, 89, American actor (Search for Tomorrow, The Odd Couple).
- John Hunt, Baron Hunt of Tanworth, 88, British civil servant and politician, cabinet secretary (1973–1979).
- Mick Ibbett, 80, Australian politician, member of the New South Wales Legislative Council (1984–1991).
- George Niven, 79, Scottish football goalkeeper (Rangers, Partick Thistle).
- M. P. Shankar, 72, Indian actor.
- Paul Sorensen, 82, American actor (Dallas, Hang 'Em High, Star Trek III: The Search for Spock).
- Sir Graham Speight, 86, New Zealand High Court judge, chief justice of the Cook Islands.
- Ma Prem Usha, 70, Indian tarot card reader and columnist, natural causes.

=== 18 ===
- Yardley Chittick, 107, American patent attorney, injuries sustained in a fall.
- Tauno Marttinen, 95, Finnish composer.
- Khosrow Shakibai, 64, Iranian actor, liver cancer.
- Dennis Townhill, 83, British chorister and organist.
- Peter Welsh, 54, Australian footballer (Hawthorn, Richmond), cancer.

=== 19 ===
- Robert Berning, 73, American grocer, principal wine buyer for Trader Joe's, bone cancer.
- Sarah Conlon, 82, British campaigner on behalf of Guildford Four and Maguire Seven, lung cancer.
- Eddie Fuller, 76, South African cricketer.
- Dercy Gonçalves, 101, Brazilian actress, pneumonia.
- Samudra Gupta, 62, Bangladeshi poet, gallbladder cancer.
- Jerome Holtzman, 82, American baseball writer, stroke.
- Ann Lambton, 96, British historian, after long illness.
- Robert Nesheim, 86, American nutritionist (Quaker Oats), developed Cap'n Crunch and Life breakfast cereals, prostate cancer.
- Dave Pearson, 70, British painter.

=== 20 ===
- Célio de Castro, 76, Brazilian politician, mayor of Belo Horizonte (1997–2001), natural causes.
- Jim Johnson, 83, British army officer.
- Yann Richter, 80, Swiss politician, president of the FDP (1978–1984), heart disease.
- Dinko Šakić, 86, Croatian fascist leader of the Independent State of Croatia in World War II, heart failure.
- Artie Traum, 65, American folk singer and guitarist, cancer.
- Charles Z. Wick, 90, American politician, director of USIA (1981–1988), natural causes.

=== 21 ===
- Harry Åkerfelt, 93, Finnish canoeist.
- Sidney Craig, 76, Canadian entrepreneur and thoroughbred horse owner, co-founder of Jenny Craig, Inc.
- Eric Dowling, 92, British prisoner of war, helped plan The Great Escape from Stalag Luft III.
- Antoni Jaszczak, 62, Polish economist, politician and minister of construction (2006).
- K-Swift, 29, American radio personality, drowned.
- El Kazovsky, 58, Russian-born Hungarian painter and artist.
- Donald Stokes, Baron Stokes, 94, British industrialist and chief executive of British Leyland (1964–1968).
- Muhlis Tayfur, 85–86, Turkish Olympic wrestler.
- María Vaner, 73, Argentine actress.
- Adil Zulfikarpašić, 86, Bosnian businessman and philanthropist, natural causes.

=== 22 ===
- Ballindaggin, 23, American Thoroughbred racehorse, euthanized.
- Joe Beck, 62, American jazz guitarist.
- Helen Brockman, 105, American fashion designer, author and professor, natural causes.
- Greg Burson, 59, American voice actor (Jurassic Park, Tiny Toon Adventures, Garfield and Friends).
- Patrick Connor, 81, British actor (Brazil, Eye of the Needle).
- Maurice Coomarawel, 68, Sri Lankan Olympic cyclist.
- Helen Gardiner, 70, Canadian philanthropist, pancreatic cancer.
- Estelle Getty, 84, American actress (The Golden Girls, Empty Nest, Mask), Emmy winner (1988), Lewy body dementia.
- Victor A. McKusick, 86, American geneticist, architect of the Human Genome Project, cancer.

=== 23 ===
- Anna Maria Cantù, 84, Italian Olympic sprinter.
- N. Robin Crossby, 54, Canadian game designer, creator of Hârn role-playing system, cancer.
- Kurt Furgler, 84, Swiss member of the Federal Council (1972–1986), heart failure.
- Ahmet Hadžipašić, 56, Bosnian politician, prime minister (2003–2007), heart attack.
- Dick Johnson, 85, American aeronautical engineer and glider pilot, gliding accident.
- Frank Schweihs, 78, American reputed mafia enforcer, cancer.
- Clay T. Whitehead, 69, American director of White House Office of Telecommunications Policy (1970–1974), prostate cancer.

=== 24 ===
- Lawrence Anastasia, 81, American politician.
- Bruce Clarke, 82, Australian jazz guitarist.
- Eddie Davidson, 35, American convicted spammer and prison escapee, suicide by gunshot.
- Norman Dello Joio, 95, American composer, natural causes.
- Zezé Gonzaga, 81, Brazilian singer, natural causes.
- Robert T. Herres, 75, American Air Force general, vice chairman of the Joint Chiefs of Staff (1987–1990), brain cancer.
- David H. Popper, 95, American diplomat, ambassador to Cyprus (1969–1973) and Chile (1974–1977), complications from a fall.

=== 25 ===
- Bruce Adler, 63, American actor, liver cancer.
- Bud Browne, 96, American surf film maker.
- Hiram Bullock, 52, American jazz guitarist, throat cancer.
- Harriet Burns, 79, American artist, first woman to work at Walt Disney Imagineering, heart complications.
- Don Callander, 78, American fantasy novel author.
- Jamiel Chagra, 63, American drug trafficker, cancer.
- Michael J. Daly, 83, American Medal of Honor recipient, cancer.
- Jeff Fehring, 53, Australian footballer, suicide.
- Johnny Griffin, 80, American jazz saxophonist.
- Tracy Hall, 88, American physical chemist, Alzheimer's disease.
- Joseph P. Landry, 86, Canadian businessman, senator (1996–1997).
- Carrie Allen McCray, 94, American author.
- Randy Pausch, 47, American computer science professor (Carnegie Mellon) and author (The Last Lecture), pancreatic cancer.
- Mikhail Pugovkin, 85, Russian actor, diabetes.
- Herizo Razafimahaleo, 53, Malagasy politician, renal failure.

=== 26 ===
- Nadir Abdurrahmanov, 82, Azerbaijani painter.
- Malik Anokha, 65, Pakistani actor, heart attack.
- Daniel Bukantz, 90, American Olympic fencer.
- Bruna Colombetti-Peroncini, 72, Italian Olympic fencer.
- Roland B. Day, 89, American judge, Wisconsin Supreme Court Justice (1974–1996).
- Ed Foster, 59, American technology columnist (InfoWorld), heart attack.
- Chas Messenger, 94, British racing cyclist.
- William H. Rogers, 94, British architect.
- Daniel Santamans, 48, French rugby union player (Stade Toulousain) and coach (national team), heart attack.

=== 27 ===
- Raymonde Allain, 96, French model and actress.
- Osvaldo Álvarez Guerrero, 67, Argentine politician, cerebral hemorrhage.
- Carl Aschan, 102, Swedish-born British intelligence officer and spy during World War II.
- Marie Kachel Bucher, 98, American teacher, last surviving resident of the Ephrata Cloister.
- Youssef Chahine, 82, Egyptian film director, cerebral hemorrhage.
- Graeme Crallan, 50, British rock drummer (White Spirit, Tank), head injuries from fall.
- Bob Crampsey, 78, British football journalist, after long illness.
- Russ Gibson, 69, American baseball catcher.
- Tomio Hosoda, 82, Japanese Olympic sprinter.
- Russell Johnston, Baron Russell-Johnston, 75, British politician, cancer.
- J. Fenwick Lansdowne, 71, Canadian wildlife artist.
- Marisa Merlini, 84, Italian actress.
- Isaac Saba Raffoul, 84, Mexican businessman.
- Julius B. Richmond, 91, American vice admiral, surgeon general (1977–1981), cancer.
- Horst Stein, 80, German conductor.
- Jean Stonell, 79, New Zealand cricketer.

=== 28 ===
- Pierre Berès, 95, French bookseller.
- Wendo Kolosoy, 83, Congolese musician, after long illness.
- Bob Margarita, 87, American football player (Chicago Bears), pneumonia.
- Midhat Mursi, 55, Egyptian al-Qaeda chemical weapons expert, missile strike.
- Margaret Ringenberg, 87, American aviator and airplane racer, natural causes.
- Sjahrir, 63, Indonesian economist and political activist, lung cancer.
- Suzanne Tamim, 30, Lebanese singer and actress, stabbed.
- Anatoly Tyazhlov, 66, Russian politician, governor of Moscow Oblast (1991–2000).

=== 29 ===
- Joseph Batten, 36, American game developer, suicide by gunshot.
- Melissa Batten, 36, American game developer (Halo 3, Gears of War), shot.
- Eula Beal, 89, American opera singer.
- Luther Davis, 91, American playwright and screenwriter.
- Edie Huggins, 72, American journalist and reporter (WCAU-TV), lung cancer.
- Bruce Edwards Ivins, 62, American microbiologist suspected of 2001 anthrax attacks, suicide by drug overdose.
- Mate Parlov, 59, Croatian boxer, Olympic and World Boxing Council light-heavyweight champion, lung cancer.
- Earlene Risinger, 81, American baseball player (All-American Girls Professional Baseball League).
- Ishmeet Singh, 19, Indian singer, drowned.
- Eric Varley, Baron Varley, 75, British politician, Secretary of State for Industry (1975–1979), cancer.
- June Walker, 74, American activist, President of Hadassah.

=== 30 ===
- Anne Armstrong, 80, American diplomat and politician, ambassador to the United Kingdom (1976–1977), cancer.
- Peter Coke, 95, British actor (Paul Temple) and playwright.
- Alfonso Dantés, 65, Mexican professional wrestler.
- Vittorio Fiorucci, 75, Canadian graphic artist, stroke.
- Anette Fredriksson, 48, Swedish Olympic swimmer.
- Tim McLean, 22, Canadian homicide victim, stabbed.
- Jack Nash, 79, German-born American businessman and hedge fund pioneer.
- Leif Pettersen, 57, Canadian football player and sportscaster, heart attack.

=== 31 ===
- Falani Aukuso, 69, Tokelauan politician, deputy director general of the Secretariat of the Pacific Community.
- Blagoje Bratić, 62, Bosnian footballer.
- Athos Bulcão, 90, Brazilian painter and sculptor, Parkinson's disease.
- Alice Chalifoux, 100, American harpist with the Cleveland Orchestra (1931–1974).
- Hirosi Ismael, 72, Micronesian politician, Vice President (1987–1991).
- Yi Cheong-jun, 68, South Korean novelist, lung cancer.
- Lee Young, 94, American jazz drummer.
