= Don Allen =

Don Allen may refer to:

== Sports ==
- Don Allen (American football) (1939–2024), American football fullback
- Don Allen (golfer) (1938–2022), American golfer
- Don Allen (cricketer) (born 1947), Australian cricketer
- Don E. Allen, American professional wrestler

== Others ==
- Don A. Allen (1900–1983), politician in California
- T. D. Allen, pen-name of Don Bala Allen and Terry (Terril) Diener Allen

== See also ==
- Donald Allen (disambiguation)
