= Berning =

Berning is a surname. Notable people with the surname include:

- Bud Berning, member of Sole and the Skyrider Band
- Karl Berning (1911–2005), American politician, actor, and writer
- Michael Berning (1941–2006), South African librarian, author, and bell ringer
- Robert Berning (1935–2008), American grocer and wine buyer
- Susie Berning (1941–2024), American golfer
- Tina Berning, German artist and illustrator
- Wilhelm Berning (1877–1955), German Catholic bishop

== See also ==
- Otto Berning, firm which originally owned the German imaging company Robot
