= Aschan =

Aschan is a surname. Notable people with the surname include:

- Carl Aschan (1906–2008), Swedish-born British intelligence officer and spy during World War II
- Lisa Aschan (born 1978), Swedish film director and screenwriter
- Ossian Aschan (1860–1939), Finnish chemist and politician
