= Chittick =

Chittick is a surname. Notable people with the surname include:

- Elizabeth Chittick (1908–2009), American feminist who served as president of the National Woman's Party
- Fred Chittick (1868–1917), Canadian ice hockey goaltender
- Neville Chittick (1924–1984), British scholar and archaeologist
- William Chittick (born 1943), leading translator and interpreter of classical Islamic philosophical and mystical texts
- Yardley Chittick (1900–2008), for several years the oldest living patent attorney in the United States

== See also ==
- Nate Hobgood-Chittick (born 1974), American football player
- Chittick Field in Long Beach, California
