= Arlman =

Arlman is a Dutch surname. People with this surname include:

- Chris Arlman (1944–2008), mayor of Dutch municipalities and chairman of Dutch professional football clubs
- E. J. Arlman, a Dutch chemist who defined the Cossee–Arlman mechanism, together with Piet Cossee
