= Donald Allen (disambiguation) =

Donald Allen (1912–2004) was an American editor, publisher and translator.

Donald Allen may also refer to:

- Donald Allen (cricketer) (1926–2008), Australian cricketer

== See also ==
- Don Allen (disambiguation)
- Donald Allan (born 1949), Australian former cyclist
- Donald James Allan (1907–1978), British classical scholar
