= Långseruds kyrka =

Church in Kyrkebol, Sweden

Coordinates: 59°16′47″N 12°40′24″E

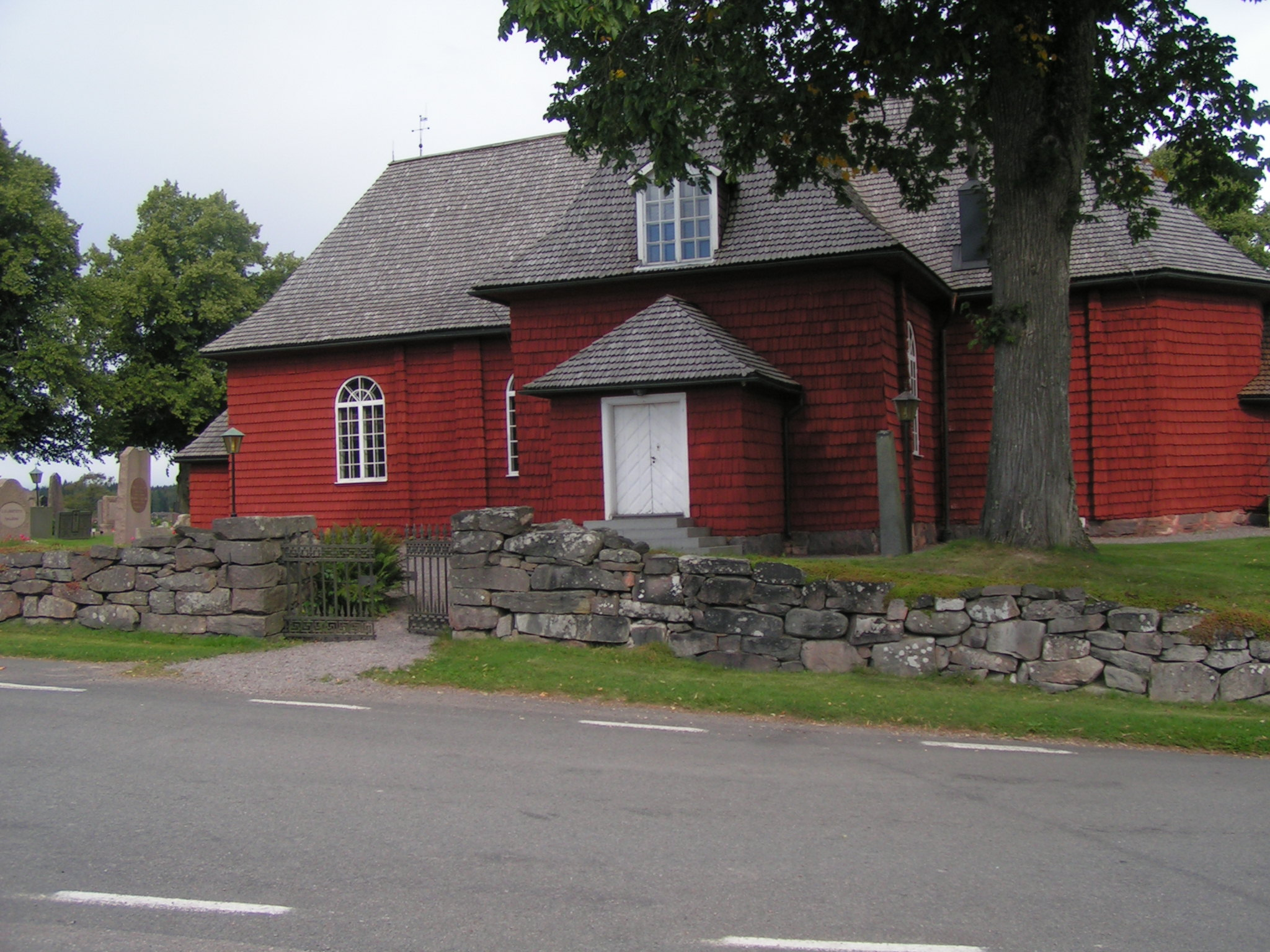
Långserud Church

Långseruds kyrka is a church in Kyrkebol, Sweden, within Säffle Municipality. It is the main church in Långserud parish.

== History ==
The church lies near Aspen's southern beach. Within Långserud parish there were in the Middle Ages three churches and chapels, namely Åstenskogs Church, Lönnskogs Chapel and Långseruds Church. The first two were likely abandoned in the Middle Ages or right after the Reformation. At the archaeological inspections in 1959 there were discoveries at the deserted churches the foundation of a wooden church with long houses and narrower chancel. The medieval church site in Långserud is still in use.

The modern church in Långserud was built in the 17th century and has been rebuilt both in the 18th and 19th centuries. The restorations in the 20th century made the church regain its 1700s character.

== Interior ==
The Långserud Church's woodwork has its origin in the 17th century. The church's interior and exterior has its style on the most important parts of the church from the 18th- and 19th century. The paint, altar and drapery is from the 18th century. The gallery and benches are from 19th century.

Baptismal font: The baptismal font is made of brass and crafted by artisan Lars Holmström in Arvika and was donated to the church in Långserud in the 1940s.

Pulpit: The pulpit is from the mid-1600s and is decorated by a so-called flat cutting. It was replaced in 1886 for a new pulpit from a style of that time. In 1925 the old pulpit was reinstalled and the pulpit from 1886 was placed on the grandstand.

Reredos: The upper part of this reredos is the oldest. Crafted in 1735 by sculptor Nils Falk The year after it was painted by Magnus Hasselbom and Hans Georg Schüffner. The lower part of was built in 1780 by Erik Jonaeus.

== Russian crucifix ==
Until the mid-1800s there was a crucifix that was stored in the church in Långserud which had been donated by an officer who resided in Långserud. In 1868 it was bought by antiquity commissioner Nils Gabriel Djurklou. Nowadays it is stored in the historical museum in Stockholm. The crucifix was supposedly made around the 1500s to 1600s.

== See also ==
- Diocese of Karlstad
