= Steve Peterson =

Steve, Stephen, or Steven Peterson may refer to:

- Steve Peterson (actor), American actor
- Steve Peterson (racing executive) (1950–2008), American technical director for NASCAR
- Steve Peterson, American musician in Peninsula Banjo Band
- Stephen Peterson (rower), American rower
- Steve Peterson (game designer), founder of Hero Games
- Steven Peterson, American mixed martial artist

== See also ==
- Steve Pederson (disambiguation)
