= Mirza Fatali Akhundov State Prize of the Azerbaijan SSR =

Azerbaijan SSR award

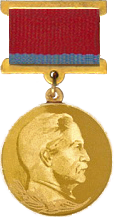
- Award badge
- Type: State
- Established: 15 December 1964
- Country: Azerbaijan SSR
- Status: canceled

Precedence
- Related: State Prize of the Azerbaijan SSR

The Mirza Fatali Akhundov State Prize of the Azerbaijan SSR (Azerbaijani: Mirzə Fətəli Axundov adına Azərbaycan SSR Dövlət mükafatı) was an award given to cultural figures distinguished in various fields of art in the Azerbaijan SSR.

== About ==
The award was established on December 15, 1964 for the activities in the fields of fiction, music, theater, fine arts, cinema and journalism in the Azerbaijan SSR. The recipients were awarded the title of "Laureate of Mirza Fatali Akhundov State Prize of the Azerbaijan SSR", a badge, a diploma and a cash prize of 2,500 manat.

The award was presented by the Council of Ministers of the Azerbaijan SSR once every two years on the day of the establishment of the Soviet government in Azerbaijan on the recommendation of the M. F. Akhundov Award Committee. The list of nominees and works nominated for the award was published in the press of the Azerbaijan SSR two months ago.

The first laureates of the prize: Mirza Ibrahimov, Maral Rahmanzadeh, Tofig Kazimov, Tahir Salahov, Gara Garayev, Hokuma Gurbanova, Zeynalov Ali Yusif oglu.

Regulation

Regulations on Mirza Fatali Akhundov State Prize of the Azerbaijan SSR were adopted on December 15, 1964.

In order to further develop Azerbaijan Soviet socialist culture, especially fiction, music, theater and fine arts, cinema and journalism and to encourage creative workers who are more distinguished in the republic and whose works meet the high needs of the party and the people the government of the Azerbaijan SSR established three awards named after prominent thinker, philosopher and playwright Mirza Fatali Akhundov:

1. Republican awards named after M. F. Akhundov are given every two years for more outstanding works of Azerbaijani Soviet literature, music, theater, fine arts and cinematography, which have high ideological and artistic significance and were approved by the general public at least half a year before the awards were given.

2. Works for M. F. Akhundov Prize are submitted by writers, composers, artists, cinematographers and journalists' unions, research institutes, theater societies, theaters, magazines and newspaper editorial offices, enterprise collectives, universities, ministries, departments and public organizations no later than three months before the awards are given.

3. Republican Award Committee named after M. F. Akhundov under the Council of Ministers of the Azerbaijan SSR, established from representatives of public organizations and cultural figures considers the nomination for the award, taking into account the public opinion, and submits its proposals for approval to the Council of Ministers of the Azerbaijan SSR.

4. The list of nominees and works nominated for the M. F. Akhundov Prize is published in the republican press on behalf of the Republican Awards Committee two months before the awarding of the relevant characteristics.

5. The decision of the Council of Ministers of the Azerbaijan SSR on awarding M. F. Akhundov Prize is published in the republican press on April 28, the anniversary of the establishment of Soviet power in Azerbaijan.

6. Authors of works awarded the M. F. Akhundov Prize are awarded the title of "Laureate of the M. F. Akhundov Prize", a badge, a diploma and a cash prize.

Lapel Badge

The sketch of the laureate's badge, diploma, as well as the description of the badge were approved on July 26, 1965.

The badge of the laureate of M. F. Akhundov State Prize of the Azerbaijan SSR consists of a medal combined with a block.

The shape of the gold medal is flat, round, 26 millimeters in diameter and 2.5 mm thick. On the front side there is a bas-relief portrait of M. F. Akhundov, and below it there is a laurel branch. The obverse of the medal has a circular relief border 0.7 mm wide.

The relief of the portrait, the laurel leaf, the border, as well as the surface of the medal are polished.

On the back of the medal is written: "Laureate of the M. F. Akhundov State Prize of the Azerbaijan SSR" (in Azerbaijani), year of issue and number of the badge.

At the top of the round medal there is a earlap with a hole to connect it to the earlap of the block through the ring.

The width of the block is 20 mm. On its obverse there is a red and blue silk moire ribbon in the proportion of the state flag of the Azerbaijan SSR - 4: 1.

The back of the block has a pin plate for attaching it to clothes. The block and ring are made of bronze drawn into golden water.

== Rewards Committee ==
At the time of its establishment, the staff of the M. F. Akhundov Award Committee under the Council of Ministers of the Azerbaijan SSR was as follows:

- Mammad Arif (chairman of the committee) – Deputy President of the Academy of Sciences of the Azerbaijan SSR
- Nadir Abdurrahmanov – People's Artist of the Azerbaijan SSR, Chairman of the Union of Artists of Azerbaijan
- Mikayil Abdullayev – People's Artist of the USSR
- Fikret Amirov – People's Artist of the Azerbaijan SSR, Deputy Chairman of the Union of Composers of Azerbaijan
- G. M. Babayan – Editor of the newspaper "Communist" (in Armenian)
- Jovdat Hajiyev – People's Artist of the Azerbaijan SSR, Rector of the Uzeyir Hajibeyov Azerbaijan State Conservatory
- M. B. Dadashov – Art Worker of the Azerbaijan SSR, Deputy Chairman of the Union of Cinematographic Works of Azerbaijan
- Jafar Jafarov – Doctor of Arts, Corresponding Member of the Academy of Sciences of the Azerbaijan SSR
- Mirza Ibrahimov – People's Writer of the Azerbaijan SSR
- Gara Garayev – People's Artist of the USSR, Chairman of the Union of Composers of Azerbaijan
- Mehdi Memmedov – People's Artist of the Azerbaijan SSR, Professor of the Azerbaijan State University named after S. M. Kirov
- Mustafa Mardanov – People's Artist of the Azerbaijan SSR, Chairman of the Azerbaijan Theater Society
- Mehdi Huseyn – First Secretary of the Writers' Union of Azerbaijan
- Mursal Najafov – candidate of art sciences
- Israfil Nazarov – Chairman of the Union of Journalists of the Azerbaijan SSR
- Pinkhos Sabsai – People's Artist of the Azerbaijan SSR
- Tahir Salahov – People's Artist of the Azerbaijan SSR
- Tofig Taghizade – Art Worker of the Azerbaijan SSR, film director
- Yashar Garayev (executive secretary) – Junior researcher of the Institute of Language and Literature of the Academy of Sciences of the Azerbaijan SSR
