= Steve Pederson (disambiguation) =

Steve Pederson is an athletic director.

Steve Pederson or Pedersen may also refer to:

- Steve Pederson (sound engineer)
- Steve Pedersen, guitarist

== See also ==
- Steve Peterson (disambiguation)
