= Doris Calloway =

American nutritionist (1923–2001)

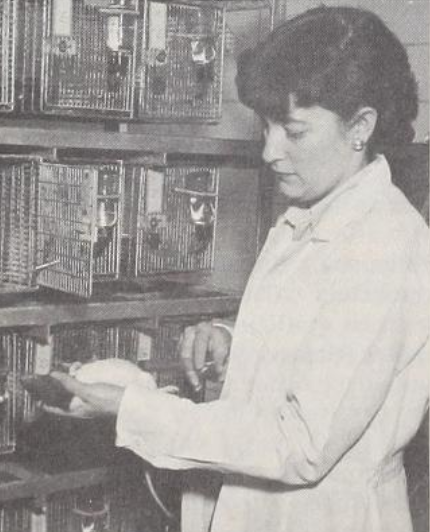
- Calloway in a United States Army publication in 1961
- Born: Doris Howes; February 14, 1923; Canton, Ohio, U.S.
- Died: August 31, 2001 (aged 78); Seattle, Washington, U.S.
- Education: University of Chicago; Ohio State University
- Spouses: Nathaniel Calloway; Robert O. Nesheim
- Scientific career
- Fields: Nutritional science
- Workplaces: University of California, Berkeley

Doris Calloway, née Howes (February 14, 1923 – August 31, 2001) was an American nutritionist noted for her studies of human metabolism, role in public health, and food preservation and safety.

== Early life and education ==
Born Doris Howes in Canton, Ohio, to Earl Howes and Lillian Roberts, both private investigators, she went to high school in East Canton and graduated as valedictorian. Though she wanted to study medicine, her family could not afford it and she studied dietetics at Ohio State University, graduating in 1943 with a bachelor's degree. She attended the University of Chicago for her doctoral studies and earned her Ph.D. in nutrition in 1947.

== Career and research ==
After obtaining her bachelor's degree, Calloway interned at the Johns Hopkins Hospital in Baltimore, as a dietician in 1944. The following year, she was a research nutritionist at the University of Illinois at Chicago medical school. At UIC, she researched how protein intake and exercise influenced the time people took to recover from surgery. Patients who ate sooner after surgery and had physical activity recovered faster than those who did not.

From 1948 to 1951, Calloway was a consulting nutritionist at the Medical Associates of Chicago. She then moved to the QM Food and Container Institute, where she was a nutritionist from 1951 to 1958, head of the metabolism lab from 1958 to 1959, and chief of the nutrition branch from 1959 to 1961. While at QM, she worked with the US Army to research the potential of foods to protect against dangerous radiation. She discovered that broccoli can have a protective effect against cancer caused by radiation. She also researched food irradiation and discovered that its effects on nutrient content were similar to heat processing.

In 1961 Calloway took a position at the Stanford Research Institute in the department of food science and nutrition, where she stayed until 1963. At Stanford, she created a freeze-dried orange juice product that eventually became Tang. She also worked on developing packaging for space food, gut microbiota, flatulence, and the potential of unicellular organisms as food. During the course of this research, Calloway discovered that lactose intolerance could be diagnosed by a breath test.

In 1963, Calloway took a position as a professor of nutrition at the University of California, Berkeley; she retired in 1991 and stayed a professor emerita until she was too affected by Parkinson's disease to work. Her research there focused on diets at different stages of life, particularly the role of nitrogen and the needs of pregnant, menstruating, and lactating people. She also researched malnutrition in Kenya, Egypt, and Mexico, and influenced the nutritional aid policies of organizations and governments worldwide. In particular, she showed that the US food assistance programs for people in poverty and Native American people were not providing adequate nutrition.

Calloway's most well-regarded work, the "Penthouse Study", investigated the metabolism of volunteers living in isolation for weeks at a time and used innovative, meticulous methods to measure their metabolism over 17 years of experiments. This research was used to set the Recommended Daily Intake values for nutrients and helped NASA determine dietary needs in space. Her research showed that previous nutritional requirements for protein were an overestimate and that excess protein was excreted.

She served a turn as a provost at the university from 1981 to 1987, the first woman to take that role at Berkeley, and consulted for the United Nations in 1971 and 1981. Calloway also consulted for the National Institutes of Health with the National Institute on Aging and the National Institute of Arthritis, Metabolic, and Digestive Diseases, the International Maize and Wheat Improvement Center, and the United States National Research Council. While a provost at Berkeley, she founded its program in Peace and Conflict Studies and worked to mentor and hire more women and people of color at the university, hiring its first woman dean and its first African-American dean.

== Personal life ==
Doris Calloway married her first husband, Nathaniel Calloway, in 1946. She had a son, David, while in graduate school and a daughter, Candace, shortly after earning her Ph.D. Nathaniel became a politician in Chicago and the couple divorced in 1956. She married nutritionist Robert Nesheim in 1981.

== Death and legacy ==
Calloway died of Parkinson's disease in 2001, survived by her husband, Robert Nesheim, and their two children. She was remembered by her colleagues for her groundbreaking research, professionalism, and public service. The University of California, Berkeley created an endowed chair in her name in 1999.

== Honors and awards ==
Calloway held several positions in academic societies and with scientific journals and won "all of the most notable awards in nutrition":

- "Man of the Year", US Army (1959)
- Associate editor, Nutrition Reviews (1962–1968)
- President, American Institute of Nutrition (1982–1983)
- Honorary doctorate, Tufts University (1992)
- Berkeley Citation, University of California, Berkeley (1992)
- Faculty Research Lecture, UC Berkeley (1992)
- Bristol-Myers Squibb/Mead Johnson Award for Distinguished Achievement in Nutrition
- Conrad Elvehjem Award, American Institute of Nutrition
- Fellow, American Institute of Nutrition
- Fellow, International Union of Nutritional Sciences
- Fellow, National Academy of Medicine
- Member, Human Biology Council

== Publications ==
- Calloway, Doris (1967). Human Ecology in Space Flight.
- Calloway, Doris (1981). Nutrition and Health.
- Editor, Nutrition and Physical Fitness (1966–1984)
