= Ali Zeylanov =

Azerbaijani Soviet actor of theatre and cinema

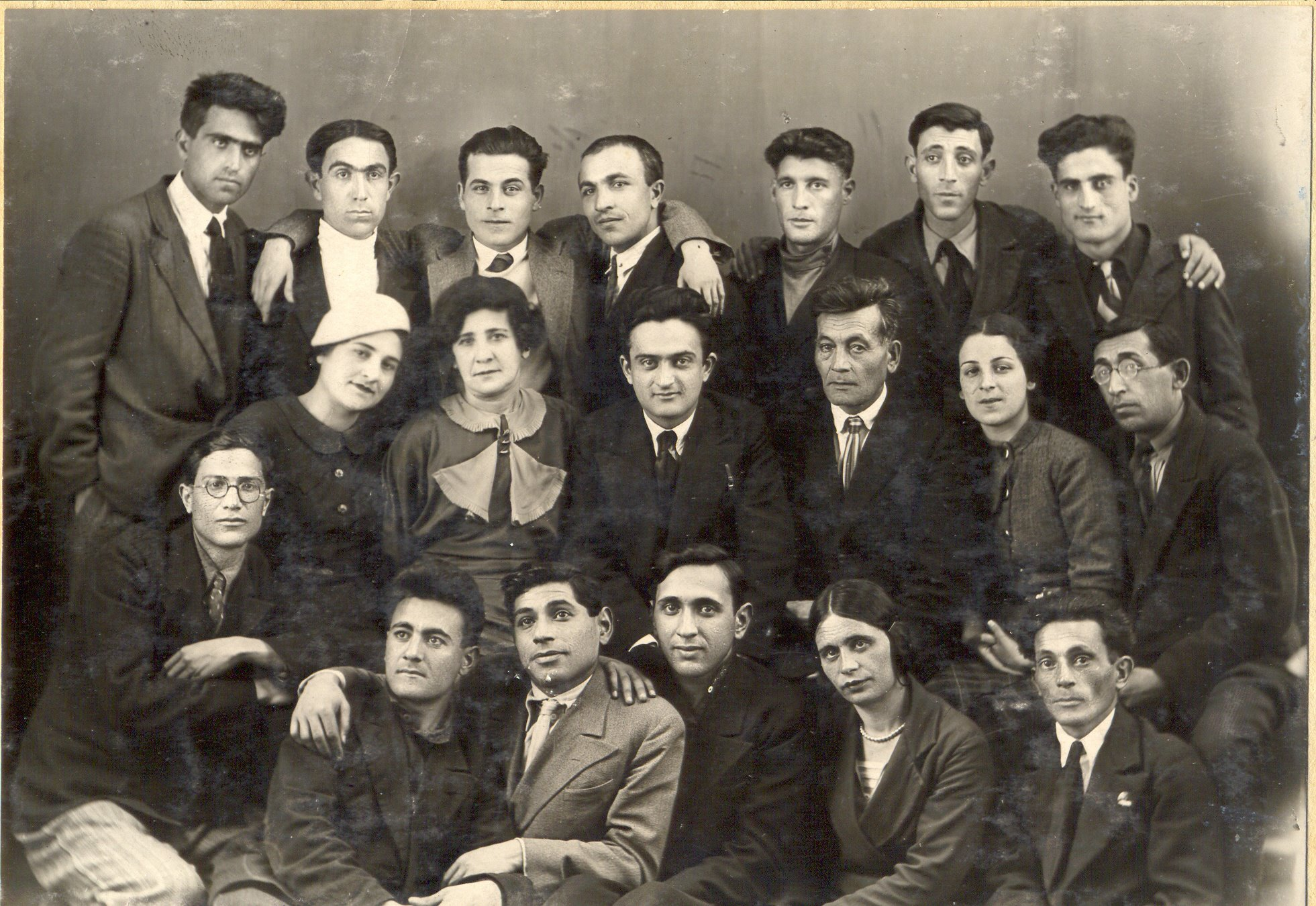
Zeynalov, standing, top row, far right, in a 1937 picture of the J. Jabbarly Yerevan Drama Theater troupe

Ali Yusif oghlu Zeynalov (Azerbaijani: Əli Yusif oğlu Zeynalov; 4 April 1913 – 4 January 1988) was an Azerbaijani Soviet actor of theater and cinema, People's Artist of the Azerbaijan SSR (1964), Honored Artist of the Armenian SSR (1939), and laureate of the Mirza Fatali Akhundov State Prize of the Azerbaijan SSR (1965).

== Biography ==
Ali Zeynalov was born on 4 April 1913 in the city of Salyan in the family of a prominent teacher, honored teacher of the Azerbaijan SSR Yusif Abdullah oglu Zeynalov. In 1933, Ali Zeynalov graduated from the Baku Theater College. From 1934 to 1945 he played on the stage of the J. Jabbarly Yerevan Drama Theater. Among the roles he has played on the stage of this theater are such roles as Bakhshi, Ogtay, and Aydin in Jafar Jabbarly's plays In 1905, Ogtay El-ogly, and Aydin, Neznamov in Alexander Ostrovsky's Guilty Without Guilt, Othello, and King Claudius in William Shakespeare's Othello and Hamlet, and others. In 1939, Ali Zeynalov was awarded the title of Honored Artist of the Armenian SSR.

From 1945 to 1975, Zeynalov performed at the M. Azizbekov Azerbaijan State Drama Theater. The best roles played by him on the stage of this theater are Seyran in Alexander Shirvanzade's Namus, Florizel and Antony in William Shakespeare's The Winter's Tale and Anthony and Cleopatra, Gilbert in Victor Hugo's Marie Tudor, Sancho in Lope de Vega's La Estrella de Sevilla, Ahmed Rza in Nâzım Hikmet's Strange man, Hasanzade in Ilyas Afandiyev's You Are Always with Me, and Protasov in Leo Tolstoy's The Living Corpse.

Ali Zeynalov was also recognized as a master of oratory. Ali Zeynalov starred in the films The Shadows Creep (1959), The Mystery of the Fortress (1960), The Legend of Love (1961), Morning (1961), and others.

In 1964, Zeynalov was awarded the title of People's Artist of the Azerbaijan SSR, and in 1965, the Mirza Fatali Akhundov State Prize of the Azerbaijan SSR. Ali Zeynalov was married to Azerbaijani actress Mirvari Novruzova. He died in Baku in 1988.

== Filmography ==
- Evening Concert (1948)
- Bakhtiyar (1955)
- The Meeting (1955)
- Young Metallurgists (1956)
- Black Stones (1956)
- Not That, So This One (1956)
- The Shadows Creep (1958)
- His Big Heart (1958)
- On Distant Shores (1958)
- The Stepmother (1958)
- A True Friend (1959)
- The Mystery of the Fortress (1960)
- Aygun (1960)
- Morning (1960)
- A Strange Story (1960
- The Adventures of Molla (1960)
- The Legend of Love (1961)
- Our Street (1961)
- The Telephonist (1962)
- I Will Dance! (1962)
- Romeo is My Neighbour (1963)
- Wonderland (1963)
- The Indestructible Battalion (1965)
- The Investigation Continues (1966)
- The Twenty-Six Baku Commissars (1966)
- Gypsy Girl (1966)
- The Mailbox (1967)
- Battle in the Mountains (1967)
- For the Sake of Justice (1968)
- I Was Not Beautiful (1968)
- Last night of childhood (1968)
- Vagif (1968)
- Life Tests Us (1972)
- Concerns of Happiness (1976)
- Face to the Wind (1977)
- Babek (1979)
- The Day After Tomorrow at Midnight (1981)
- Life of Uzeir (1981)
- The Old Pier (1984)
- The Legend of the Silver Lake (1985)
