= Murder of Melissa Batten =

2008 murder-suicide in Redmond, Washington, US

- Location: Redmond, Washington, U.S.
- Date: July 29, 2008; 18 years ago 9:05 a.m. (PDT; UTC−04:00)
- Target: Melissa Batten
- Attack type: Uxoricide; murder-suicide
- Weapon: 9mm semi-automatic pistol
- Deaths: 2 (including the perpetrator)
- Perpetrator: Joseph Batten

Melissa Brooks Batten (March 2, 1972 – July 29, 2008), a software development engineer, was murdered by her husband Joseph Eugene Batten (January 23, 1972 – July 29, 2008), a video game programmer, in Redmond, Washington, United States. Joseph immediately died by suicide after the murder.

Melissa had taken out an order of protection against her husband on July 21, eight days before he murdered her.

== Background ==
=== Early lives and education ===
Melissa Brooks Batten, the victim, was a graduate of Harvard Law. Joseph Batten was born in Parkersburg, West Virginia, on January 23, 1972. Joseph earned a degree in mathematics from Marshall University.

=== Careers ===
Melissa was a public defender working on domestic cases for the Public Defender's Office in Mecklenburg County, North Carolina, from 2000 to 2002. She moved to Washington state in 2002, and soon after started working at Microsoft Game Studios, where Joseph was employed as a programmer for video games. Melissa was credited on Halo 3 and Gears of War as a Software Development Engineer in Test, and was also working in a support role with developer Rare on the Xbox 360. Joseph later worked at Wizards of the Coast as a Senior Project Manager. Joseph was also the project head for Gleemax; on July 28, 2008, Wizards announced that Gleemax would be shut down so that they could concentrate on D&D Insider.

The Battens lived together in Kent, Washington.

== Murder-suicide ==
On June 5, 2008, after learning of an affair Melissa had, Joseph confronted her and at one point he pointed a gun at her, and then at his own head. Melissa moved into a friend's apartment in Redmond soon after, but Joseph learned where she was staying. A mutual friend was able to convince him to sell his .22 caliber handgun back to the dealer, but Joseph later purchased a .357 Magnum Smith & Wesson revolver and a 9mm Taurus semi-automatic pistol. Joseph broke into her place of work at the Microsoft campus on July 16 while she was not in town, and when security guards caught him he was told he was not allowed to return to the campus. Melissa told police that he tried to call her over 30 times on July 19 and 20. Melissa got a protection order against Joseph on July 21, which said he was not allowed to come within 100 yards of her, and was served to him on July 25. She had begun the process of filing for divorce.

Shortly after 9 am on July 29, 2008, Melissa left the apartment to go to work. Joseph approached her while she was in the parking lot and fired several fatal shots into her torso with a 9mm handgun before shooting himself in the head. Investigators at the scene discovered fuzzy handcuffs, hardcore pornography, an 8-inch cutting knife, plus $6,000 in the trunk of Joseph's Mercedes sedan.

=== Aftermath ===
Microsoft provided grief counseling to Melissa's surviving relatives, and helped family and colleagues organize memorials. The murder was used as an example in debates on domestic violence and gun rights in Washington state as laws in other states may have prevented him from purchasing additional firearms after his .22 caliber handgun was sold. Washington state legislator Roger Goodman cited the Batten case in the passage of a 2014 state gun control law that involved domestic violence.

== See also ==
- Gun laws in Washington (state)
