= T. D. Allen =

T. D. Allen is the pen name of an American couple, Don Bala Allen (born Luther Mason Dimmitt, 1889 or 1890 – June 9, 1966) and Terry (Terril) Diener Allen (August 13, 1908 – November 9, 2008 ) who wrote non-fiction and fiction about American Indians.
