= Jim Johnson (British Army officer) =

British Army officer (1924–2008)

Henry James Johnson
- Nickname: Jim
- Born: 21 December 1924
- Died: 20 July 2008 (aged 83)
- Allegiance: United Kingdom
- Branch: Special Air Service, British Army
- Service years: 1939–1963
- Rank: Colonel
- Service number: 300853 (Officer); 22222514 (Trooper)
- Conflicts: Second World War
- Awards: Officer of the Order of the British Empire (OBE)

Henry James Johnson OBE, TD (1924–2008) was a Colonel in the British Army. He commanded the 21 SAS (TA), after which he led Britain's clandestine war against Egyptian forces in Yemen during the mid-1960s. After that he set up Britain's first post-war private military company.

== Early life ==
Johnson was born 21 December 1924 then educated at Westminster School and was there at the same time as Tony Benn.

== Military career ==
He joined the British Army and was commissioned as a second lieutenant in the Welsh Guards on 21 November 1943.

Johnson relinquished his military commission on 8 June 1948 to join the Territorial Army SAS as a trooper. He was then promoted back to lieutenant on 19 October 1948, with seniority from 21 December 1947. He was made an acting captain on 1 June 1950, which was confirmed on 21 December 1951, with seniority from 1 June 1950. He was made an acting major on 15 March 1953, and reverted to the rank of captain on 15 June 1954. He then received a series of promotions, which eventually led to the rank of Colonel. He was appointed as Aide-de-Camp to Queen Elizabeth II on 18 October 1969, which he held until 18 October 1974.

Johnson died 20 July 2008.

== Awards and decorations ==
Johnson was appointed an Officer of the Order of the British Empire on for his services to the TA.
