= Medical Center Leeuwarden =

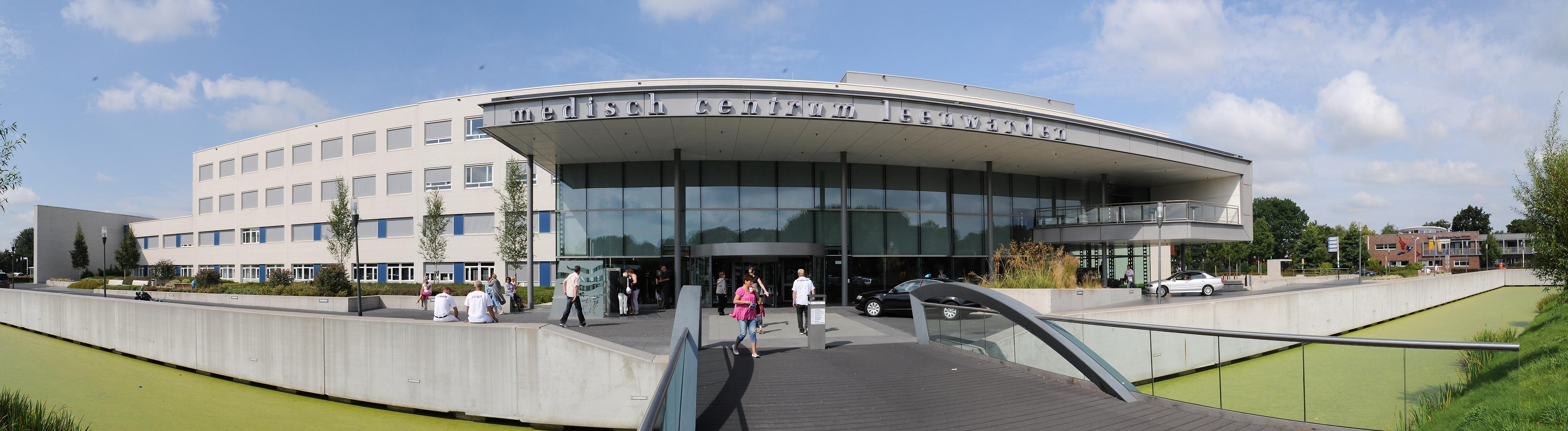

- Location in The Netherlands

Geography
- Location: Henri Dunantweg 2, 8934 AD Leeuwarden, the Netherlands
- Coordinates: 53°11′20″N 5°48′16″E

Organisation
- Type: Teaching

Services
- Emergency department: Yes
- Beds: 647

Helipads
- Helipad: Yes

History
- Founded: 1982

Links
- Website: https://www.mcl.nl/
- Lists: Hospitals in the Netherlands

The Medical Center Leeuwarden (MCL; Dutch: Medisch Centrum Leeuwarden) is the hospital of the city of Leeuwarden. It is one of the country's major top-clinical centers, offering secondary and tertiary care.

It has 647 beds, and offers all common specialties including pulmonology, cardiovascular surgery and neurosurgery. It is also a teaching hospital for numerous medical specialties, as well as nurses.

A secondary hospital affiliated with the MCL, called MCL-Harlingen, is located in the town of Harlingen. This hospital merged with the MCL because it was too small to prevent closure, unless it merged with another, larger hospital.
