= Tina Berning =

German artist

Tina Berning (born 1969 in Braunschweig, West Germany) is a Berlin-based artist and illustrator. After working as a graphic designer for several years Tina Berning focused on drawing and Illustration in 2000. Since then her award-winning illustrations are published worldwide and are shown in many renowned anthologies. Tina Berning's illustrations have been featured in publications like The New York Times, Playboy (US and Germany), Vogue (Italia, Nippon, Germany), Die Zeit, Süddeutsche Zeitung, and Architectural Digest.

Her early passion for editorial illustration led her to an intensive contemplation on the human figure. Reflecting the female role in media is one of the core issues in her artistic work. Her work as a fine artist is shown regularly in solo exhibitions in the US, Germany, Japan, the Netherlands and Canada.

== Exhibitions (selection) ==
Solo exhibitions

- 2016: Those Who Stay - Alison Milne Gallery | Toronto, Canada
- 2010: Tina Berning: Selected Works - Alison Milne Gallery | Toronto, Canada
- 2010: FACE/project (in collaboration with the photographer Michelangelo Di Battista) - gallery Camera Work | Berlin, Germany
- 2009: The Passengers (catalog) - gallery Hanahou | New York, USA
- 2009: The Listeners (catalog) - gallery Andreas Binder | Munich, Germany
- 2008: No Nipples. No Guns. No Cigarettes. (catalog) - 2agenten, galerie für illustration | Berlin, Germany
- 2007: 100 Girls On Cheap Paper (The New York Girls) - gallery Hanahou | New York, USA
- 2007: 100 Girls On Cheap Paper (The Tokyo Girls) - gallery Lele | Tokyo, Japan
- 2006: 100 Girls On Cheap Paper - gallery Donkersloot | Amsterdam, Netherlands
- 2006: 100 Girls On Cheap Paper (catalog) - gallery Wallstreet-One | Berlin, Germany

Group exhibitions

- 2011: Once Upon a Time - Alison Milne Gallery | Toronto, Canada
- 2008: Fashion (in collaboration with the photographer Michelangelo Di Battista) - gallery Camera Work | Berlin, Germany
- 2008: Presented by 2agenten - 2agenten, galerie für illustration | Berlin, Germany
- 2008: Spread The Lead - gallery Hanahou | New York, USA
- 2008: A Drawing A Day - gallery Hanahou | New York, USA
- 2005: Bilderklub - gallery Wallstreet-One | Berlin, Germany

== Publications ==
- 2009: 100 Girls On Cheap Paper - One hundred drawings by Tina Berning, published by Chronicle Books (Reprint), USA; ISBN 978-3000199127
- 2009: The Passengers - Twentynine Drawings by Tina Berning, catalog published by Gallery Hanahou, USA
- 2009: The Listeners - Thirtynine Drawings by Tina Berning, catalog published by Gallery Andreas Binder, Germany
- 2008: No Nipples, No Guns, No Cigarettes - Thirtythree Drawings by Tina Berning, catalog published by 2agenten, Gallery für illustration, Germany
- 2006: 100 Girls On Cheap Paper - One hundred drawings by Tina Berning, published by Printkultur, Germany; ISBN 3000199128
