= Ossian Aschan =

Finnish chemist and politician

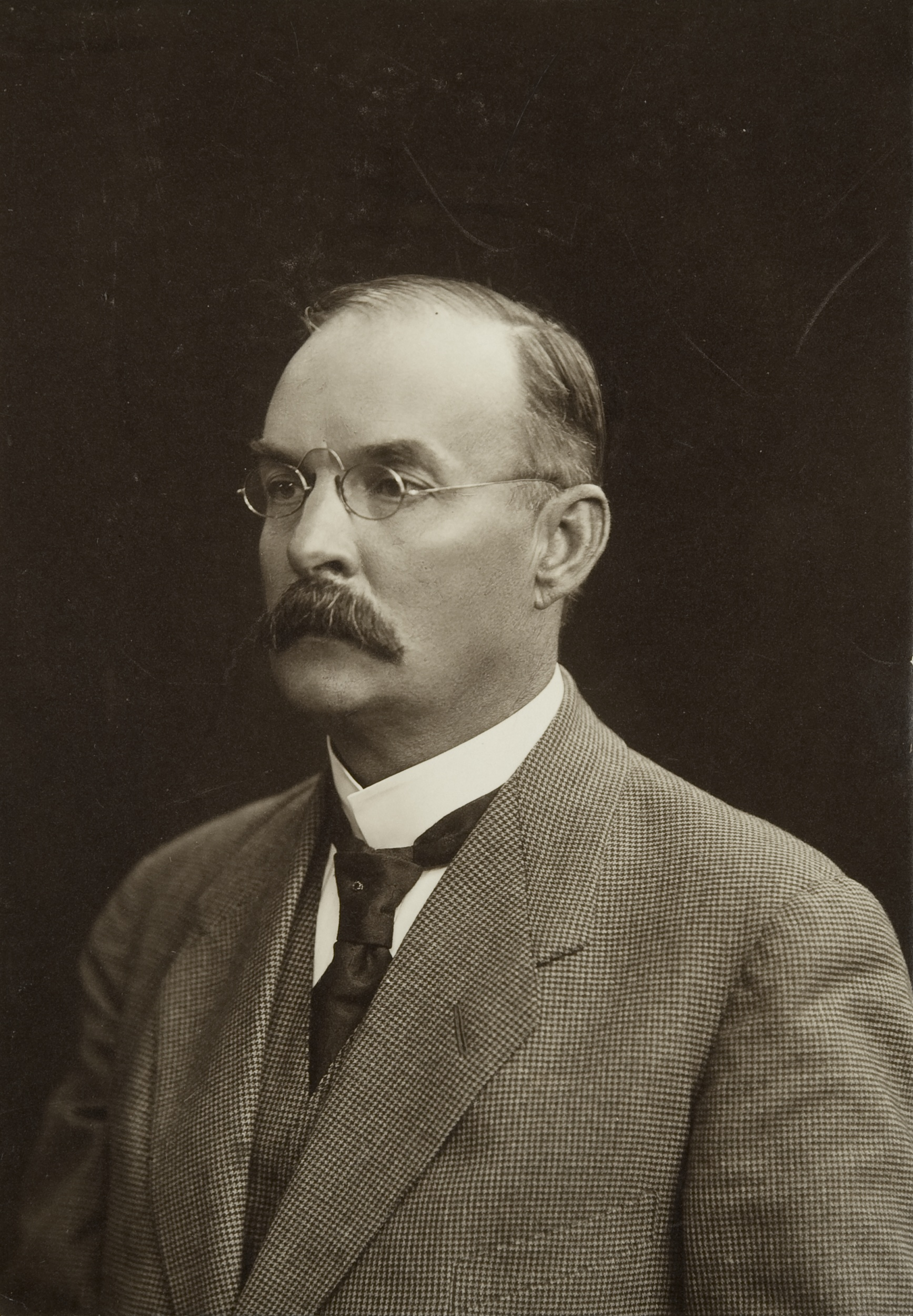
Ossian Aschan in 1922.

Adolf Ossian Aschan (16 May 1860, Helsinki – 25 February 1939) was a Finnish chemist and politician. He was a member of the Parliament of Finland from 1910 to 1911, representing the Swedish People's Party of Finland (SFP). He served as the professor of chemistry at the University of Helsinki from 1908 to 1927.
