= Robert Nesheim =

American nutritionist (1921–2008)

Robert Olaf Nesheim (September 13, 1921 – July 19, 2008) was an American nutritionist for Quaker Oats. During his time he worked for Quaker he helped develop cereals such as Cap'n Crunch and Life. He worked with the brand from 1952 to 1983. He briefly taught at his alma mater, the University of Illinois, in the 1960s.

After working with Quaker, he worked on improving food guidelines for the healthcare industry and the military. Nesheim served with Nevin S. Scrimshaw and others on the Food and Nutrition Board of the National Academy of Sciences in 1974 when the Committee on Amino Acids reported. He married nutritionist Doris Howes Calloway in 1981.

Nesheim retired in 1998. He suffered from prostate cancer for several years. Nesheim died on July 19, 2008.
