= Elizabeth Chittick =

Elizabeth Chittick (November 11, 1908 – April 16, 2009) was an American feminist who served as president of the National Woman's Party.

== Leadership of the National Woman's Party ==
Elizabeth Chittick
- Organization: National Woman's Party
- Known for: Advocacy for the Equal Rights Amendment
- Movement: Women's rights movement

Chittick first got involved with the National Woman's Party in 1962 when she met Alice Paul. She began serving as president in 1971. A long serving president, she was elected president for five terms. In 1975, she traveled the country advocating for the Equal Rights Amendment. From 1971 to 1975 she was chairman of the NWP and subsequently served as president from 1975 to 1989.

A Republican, Chittick participated in politics helping to convince the 1976 Republican National Convention to reaffirm their support for the Equal Rights Amendment (ERA). In 1977, after the death of suffragist and Equal Rights Amendment author Alice Paul, the founder of the National Woman's Party, Chittick organized and led the Alice Paul Memorial March up Pennsylvania Avenue in Washington, D.C. The march drew an approximate 5,000 marchers including former suffragists.

During her leadership of the NWP Chittick authored "Answers to Questions About the Equal Rights Amendment" and appeared on television and radio to support the amendment. In 1978 Chittick became the first woman to address the Oklahoma House of Representatives, a state that had not ratified the ERA. In 1975, Chittick was a delegate to the International Women's Year conference in Mexico and, in 1985, the U.S. representative to the Commission on the Status of Women at the World Woman's Conference in Nairobi, Kenya.

== Sewall-Belmont House ==
Chittick also led efforts to save the Sewall–Belmont House, which had been the headquarters of the National Woman's Party since 1929. Sewall-Belmont was subsequently placed on the National Register of Historic Places and is used as an educational facility for women's equal rights and a gathering place for social events. Eleanor Smeal, president of the Feminist Majority Foundation and former president of the National Organization for Women credited Chittick with virtually single-handedly saving the landmark.

Chittick was the first woman civilian administrator of the U.S. Naval Air Stations in Seattle, Washington and Banana River, Florida, the first woman to be a registered representative of the New York Stock Exchange, and the first female revenue collections officer with the Internal Revenue Service.

== Personal life ==
Chittick traveled to Russia in 1992 on reported on the status of the women's movement in that country. She died on April 16, 2009, at age 100.
