= Ambuya Mlambo =

Zimbabwean children's broadcaster (1924–2008)

Ambuya Mlambo (1924–2008) was a revolutionary Zimbabwean children's broadcaster, broadcasting radio and television programs for children before and after Zimbabwe's independence in 1980. She is to children in Zimbabwe as Mr. Rogers was to children in the United States.

== Biography ==
Ambuya Mlambo was born in what was then known as then Southern Rhodesia. She was raised in an orphanage run by Christian missionaries after the death of her mother: her father dropped her off at the orphanage at the age of five along with her younger sister. Despite colonial iniquities and growing up in the harsh conditions of an orphanage, she graduated with a teaching diploma. Ultimately she returned to school and received a diploma in nursing, and would serve as a nurse and midwife in her community. She distinguished herself as one of the very few women of that time who would excel in education despite the challenges of the time.

She began broadcasting children's programs on a local channel in the late 1960s. Her shows were both educational and entertaining. She would write children's stories and read them on air. Often you would find children in the townships of Zimbabwe singing, dancing, and laughing along with her in front of a radio as they listened to her distinctive voice. The name "Ambuya" means grandmother, as she became known as everyone's grandmother. This was primarily because in the midst of the laughing and joking, she educated children about good behavior - like a grandmother would do.

After independence, she began to broadcast her shows on TV. The children's shows were either recorded in the studio with children from the community or were broadcast at schools. Her radio and TV shows included Farai Vana Vadiki, Potonjere, Look and Learn, and Crystal Sweets Corner. Some were in English and some were in Shona. She also made appearances in several TV shows as an actress. Besides raising her own six children, she raised nearly eight other children in her household.

She married John Mlambo (died 1975) and had six children. She has 16 grandchildren and six great-grandchildren. At the age of 76 she was honored with a Doctorate in Arts by the University of Zimbabwe. She continued to work with organizations that support children's causes. After independence in 1980 she remained in the township of Mbare while most Zimbabweans moved to more affluent areas. On July 16, 2007, Ambuya Mlambo, along with the Tumbuka Dance Company, opened the 50th anniversary of the National Gallery of Zimbabwe with a dance and act that focused on humility and tolerance.
