= Nils Gabriel Djurklou =

Swedish archeologist, chamberlain and ethnologist (1829–1904)

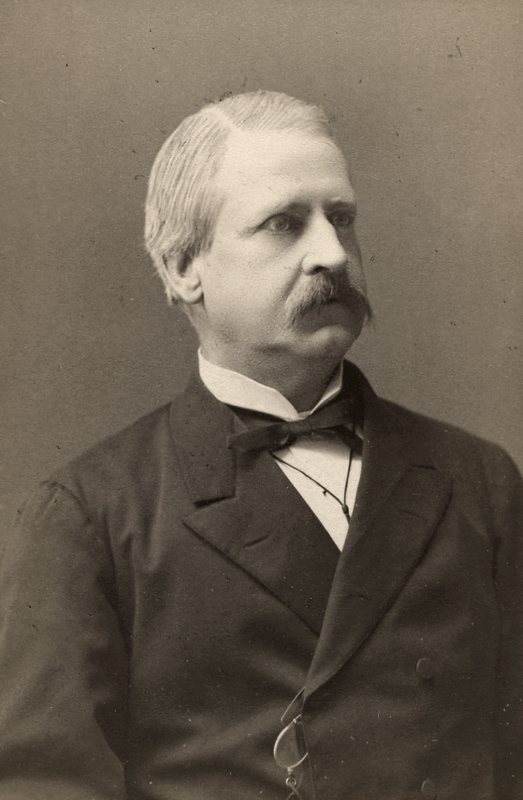
- Born: 24 July 1829; Norrbyås, Sweden
- Died: 31 March 1904 (aged 74); Örebro, Sweden
- Education: Uppsala University
- Occupations: Archeologist; Chamberlain; Ethnologist; Writer
- Spouse: Hedvig von Hennings
- Relatives: Carl Aschan (grandson)

Nils Gabriel Djurklou KVO1kl (24 July 1829 – 31 March 1904) was a Swedish writer, archeologist, chamberlain and ethnologist.

== Early years ==
Djurklou was born in Norrbyås at Sörby Manor, near Örebro in Sweden, then part of the Union between Sweden and Norway.

He was a member of the Swedish aristocratic Djurklou family. His father, Baron Gabriel Djurklou (1780–1843), was a military personnel. Djurklou's mother, Baroness Christina Silfverschiöld (1790–1853), was the daughter of Nils Silfverschiöld.

Djurklou graduated from Uppsala University in 1854.

== Career ==
Djurklou published several books on folk life in Sweden. Furthermore, he founded a provincial vernacular and ancient monuments association in 1856, in Närke, the first of its kind in Sweden.

Djurklou was a member of the Royal Swedish Academy of Letters, History and Antiquities, starting in 1862 as a corresponding member, and in 1872 as a working member.
