= James H. Humphrey =

James H. (Harry) Humphrey (February 26, 1911 – July 11, 2008) was an educator and leader in the field of physical education.

== Education ==
Humphrey earned a bachelor's degree from Denison University, and continued his education at Case Western Reserve University, where he earned a master's degree. He later earned a doctorate from Boston University.

== Career ==
Humphrey served as Director of Health and Physical Education for Bedford, Ohio City Schools. From 1943 to 1945, he took a leave of absence to serve as a physical training officer in the U.S. Naval Reserve. In 1951, he became Assistant Professor of Health and Physical Education at Michigan State University, holding the position for two years. In 1953, he joined the faculty of the University of Maryland and became a full professor in 1956.

== Contributions ==
Humphrey wrote many textbooks, children's books, articles, and research reports in the field of physical education. He served as Research Editor of the Journal of School Health and as Director of the Institute on Research Design and Techniques in School and College Health Education. Humphrey's research was focused in the area of child education through motor activity. He argued that children tend to learn more readily when learning is associated with activity. Through his research, he developed the AMAV Technique, a procedure for teaching reading through movement. The AMAV Technique is widely used to assist children with reading difficulties.
