= Ed Foster (writer) =

American journalist

Edward Sanders Foster (March 28, 1949 – July 26, 2008) was an American columnist for InfoWorld, best remembered for his Gripelog column in InfoWorld, and his work opposing UCITA. Foster worked at InfoWorld as a reporter, writer, editor, and publication executive for over 20 years. In 1993 he launched his popular column, "The Gripe Line", which later became an ongoing blog.

Foster had a son, Jeff.
