= Eric Dowling =

Eric Perry Dowling (22 July 1915 – 21 July 2008) was a British Royal Air Force navigator who participated in the Second World War breakout known as "The Great Escape".

Dowling was born on 22 July 1915 in Glastonbury, Somerset. Before the Second World War he worked for his father, a miller and cattle food Manufacturer.

250 prisoners of war, in all, had been set to attempt an escape via three tunnels ("Tom", "Dick" and "Harry"). One tunnel was uncovered by guards. Another was used to store the earth excavated from Harry. The remaining tunnel, whose entrance was concealed beneath a stove in one of the huts, was too short to allow the airmen to emerge in the nearby woodland, and the men made a dash for cover over open ground.

76 men managed this undetected, but the next man was spotted and the escape curtailed. All but two of the escapees were recaptured. 50 officers among them were executed on Hitler's orders. Dowling, who personally knew some of those officers, was reportedly less than impressed with the Hollywood film version of the events.

While imprisoned he became fluent in five languages. He achieved the rank of squadron leader. He later worked in Norway as an air crash investigator for the RAF, where he met the woman who would become his wife, Agnes Marie.

== Family ==
Dowling married Agnes Marie in January 1946 in Norway after a six-week courtship. They had a son and a daughter. After leaving the RAF, Dowling worked for British Aerospace at Filton, Bristol. Agnes died in 1997 add Dowling died on 21 July 2008 at Stoke Bishop.
