= Chris Arlman =

Dutch politician (1944–2008)

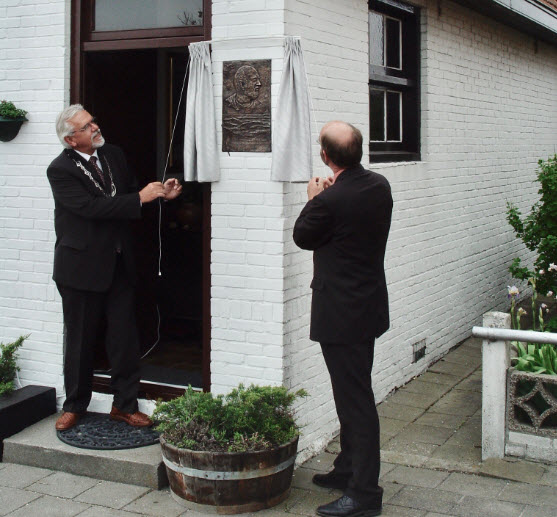
- Mayor Arlman (left) unveils a plaque in Harlingen (2005)

Mayor of Nieuweschans
- In office 1981–1990

Mayor of Pekela
- In office 1990–1998

Mayor of Harlingen
- In office 1998–2006

Mayor of Bellingwedde
- Acting
- In office 2007–2007

Chairman of the Green Coastal Road
- In office 1986–1988?

Chairman of BV Veendam
- In office 1992–1998

Chairman of SC Cambuur
- In office 1999–2000

Chairman of the Association of Wadden Sea Coast Municipalities
- In office 2001?–2003?

Chairman of the Blue Peter Foundation
- In office 2006–2008

Personal details
- Born: Christiaan Arlman; February 26, 1944 Meppel, Netherlands
- Died: July 2, 2008 (aged 64) Leeuwarden, Netherlands
- Party: Labour
- Spouse: Liesbeth Landman (m. 1965)
- Children: Maarten, Marije, Ivette

Christiaan "Chris" Arlman (26 February 1944 – 2 July 2008) was a Dutch politician of the Labour Party (PvdA). During 26 years he was the mayor of four different municipalities, and the chairman of two professional football clubs. He is noted for developing wellness tourism to Nieuweschans, being the first mayor of a united Pekela, for expanding the sea port of Harlingen, and for handling major budget crises at BV Veendam and Cambuur Leeuwarden.

== Career ==
=== 1963–1981: Early municipal career ===
In 1963 Arlman started his career as a civil servant at the Leeuwarden municipality. In 1967 he became deputy manager of general affairs in Winterswijk.

In 1971 Arlman was appointed as manager of general affairs of Heiloo. His last plain employee position was deputy municipality manager of Menaldumadeel.

=== 1981–1988: Mayor of Nieuweschans and Pekela; Chairman of BV Veendam ===
In 1981 Arlman leaped to the positions of mayor and municipality manager of Nieuweschans. From Nieuweschans, Arlman gained national publicity by developing international spa tourism to the tiny community. His interest in tourism landed him in 1986 also on the position of chairman of the Danish-German-Dutch Green Coastal Road.

In 1990 Arlman became the first mayor of Pekela, uniting Oude Pekela and Nieuwe Pekela. From 1 January 1992, he doubled as chairman of the professional football club BV Veendam. The seven-year chairmanship of Veendam was marked by severe budget crises, yet Arlman managed to keep the paid football going.

=== 1988–2006: Mayor of Harlingen; Chairman of SC Cambuur ===
In 1998, Arlman became the mayor of the City of Harlingen. As a mayor, he pushed to widen the N31 highway, connecting Harlingen and the Afsluitdijk. Arlman's term as mayor had a strong focus on the development of Harlingen's sea port.

In 1999 he was also appointed Chairman of Eredivisie club SC Cambuur in Leeuwarden. In 2000, Arlman and the entire board resigned after a sponsor deal with Voetbal Online exploded and Arlman had filled the hole in the budget with loans from Leeuwarden's municipality.

In the early 2000s, Arlman served as the chairman of the Association of Wadden Sea Coast Municipalities.

=== 2006–2008: Knighted upon retirement; Acting Mayor of Bellingwedde ===
In June 2006, at his retirement as Mayor of Harlingen, he was made knight in the Order of Orange-Nassau for his contributions at expanding the harbor. After retirement, Arlman replaced Else Boutkan as chairman of the Blue Peter Foundation. During 2007, he was called back from retirement to act as mayor of Bellingwedde. Blue Peter folded after Arlman's death in 2008.

== Life events and education ==
Christiaan Arlman was born in Meppel on 26 February 1944. He graduated from a HBS high school in Sneek.

Chris Arlman married Liesbeth Landman in 1965, in Sneek. The couple had three children.

On 2 July 2008, at the age of 64, Arlman suffered a heart attack at the Eendracht Frisian handball association in Harlingen. He was transferred to the Medical Center Leeuwarden, where he died later that day.

== Writing ==
- Arlman, Chris. 2000. "De uitreiking van de Anton Wachterprijs. Geplande maar door afwezigheid van de prijswinnaar niet uitgesproken toespraak van burgemeester Chris Arlman van Harlingen. Anton Wachterprijs 21 oktober 2000." [The awarding of the Anton Wachter Prize. Scheduled but in the absence of the prize winner unspoken speech by Mayor Chris Arlman of Harlingen. Anton Wachter Prize 21 October 2000.] Vestdijkkroniek. Pages 49–50.
