= Don Allen (cricketer) =

Australian cricketer (born 1947)

Personal information
- Full name: Donald John Allen
- Born: 26 February 1947 (age 79); Lismore, New South Wales, Australia
- Batting: Left-handed

Domestic team information
- Years: Team
- 1971/72–1974/75: Queensland

Career statistics
Competition	First-class
Matches	11
Runs scored	386
Batting average	18.38
100s/50s	0/1
Top score	61
Catches/stumpings	4/–
- Source: Cricinfo, 2 April 2024

Donald John Allen (born 26 February 1947) is a former Australian first-class cricketer who played for Queensland in 11 first-class matches in the 1970s.
