= Robert Berning =

American grocer and wine buyer

- Born: January 25, 1935; Avalon, California, U.S.
- Died: July 19, 2008 (aged 73); Fallbrook, California, U.S.
- Occupation: Wine buyer
- Known for: Introducing American consumers to low-cost, bargain imported wines while working with Trader Joe's
- Spouse: Nancy Anne Vigil-Berning
- Children: 4

Robert Berning (January 25, 1935 – July 19, 2008) was an American grocer and principal wine buyer for Trader Joe's specialty grocery store chain beginning in the 1970s. He was credited with introducing American consumers to low-cost, bargain imported wines while working with Trader Joe's.

== Biography ==
Robert Berning was born in Avalon on Santa Catalina Island, California, on January 25, 1935. His father worked as a greenskeeper on a Santa Catalina golf course.

=== Early career ===
Berning began his career in the grocery industry at the age of 16 when he took a job at King Cole Markets in Whittier, California, in 1951. He was promoted to store supervisor at King Cole a few years afterwards. Soon he developed an interest in selling wines which had been imported from Europe.

=== Trader Joe's ===
Berning was hired by Pronto Markets, a chain of convenience stores based in Los Angeles in 1965. Pronto Markets was in the midst of its transformation from a convenience store to the Trader Joe's specialty grocery chain, which would officially be founded in 1967. Wines became a very important focus of the newly founded Trader Joe's and Berning would play a key part in that success. Joe Coulombe, the founder of Trader Joe's, said in an interview with the Los Angeles Times that Berning was brought into the company's main office in 1970 because he had expressed interest in wines. 1970 also coincided with the time that Trader Joe's began its "aggressive wine merchandising," which meant that Trader Joe's began offering wines at lower prices than had been previously available in the marketplace.

Berning quickly became Trader Joe's head wine buyer. He is credited with building Trader Joe's private wine label program. Berning's program offered wines from around the world under the Trader Joe's label. These wines were allowed to be sold at very inexpensive prices because of the Trader Joe's branded label. Under California law at the time, there were fair trade provisions for alcoholic beverages which made it illegal to sell wines at a cheaper price than branded competitors, such as Gallo's. Berning's program simply "got around" the alcohol fair trade laws by offering their own wines under the Trader's Joe brand, the Trader Joe's Winery label. The program was a huge success, which helped Trader Joe's stay competitive in wine retailing for eight years until the alcohol fair trade laws were abolished in 1978.

Coulombe credited Berning with innovating Trader Joe's ability to buy and distribute lower-cost wines to their own stores without the use of traditional wholesalers. Trader Joe's, in turn, is credited as one of the pioneers which popularized wine in the United States. Under Berning's guidance, Trader Joe's began offering selections from small California wineries, some of which later became well-known brands themselves, including Heitz Wine Cellars, Mirassou Winery and Schramsberg. Berning traveled throughout California and the world to find wines for sale in Trader Joe's. Berning was featured in a series of radio commercials in the late 1980s and early 1990s in the Los Angeles metropolitan area.

Berning retired from Trader Joe's in the middle of the 1990s. However, his legacy of marketing higher-quality, low-cost wines at the company continue. For example, the popularity of Charles Shaw wines, which has been nicknamed "Two Buck Chuck" for its $1.99 price.

=== Later life ===
Berning moved to Fallbrook, California, with his family following his retirement from Trader Joe's. He purchased a ranch where he grew limes and avocados. He continued to work within the wine industry as a consultant for Plume Ridge, import company based in San Dimas, California, which is owned by his daughter, Christina. He worked for the company until his illness in early 2008.

Robert Berning died at his home in Fallbrook of bone cancer on July 19, 2008, at the age of 73. His wife, Nancy Anne Vigil-Berning died of cancer on October 11, 2005. He was survived by his daughters, Christina, Nanette Berning-Pate and Julia Berning-Escamilla; and his son, Craig.
