= Nadir Abdurrahmanov =

Nadir Abdurrahmanov Nadir Əbdürrəhmanov
- Born: Nadir Qəmbər oğlu Əbdürrəhmanov; December 5, 1925; Lachin, Azerbaijan SSR
- Died: July 26, 2008 (aged 82); Baku, Azerbaijan
- Citizenship: USSR, Azerbaijan
- Occupation: Painter
- Awards: Honored Art Worker of the Azerbaijan SSR People's Artist of the Azerbaijan SSR State Prize of the Azerbaijan SSR Order of the Badge of Honour

Nadir Abdurrahmanov (Azerbaijani: Nadir Əbdürrəhmanov; 5 December 1925 – 26 July 2008) was a painter, Honored Art Worker, and People's Artist of the Azerbaijan SSR.

== Biography ==
Abdurrahmanov was born on December 5, 1925, in Lachin. He studied at a Painting School named after Azim Azimzade in 1941-1944. Later he studied at Leningrad Institute of Fine Arts, Sculpture and Architecture named after Ilya Repin in 1947-1953. However, the artist received his first higher education in the field of medicine, not art. In 1944-1947 he studied at Azerbaijan State Medical Institute.

Abdurrahmanov painted large-format subject-themed paintings at an early stage of his work as "The View of Baku" (1954), "Industrial Landscape" (1954), "In the Highlands" (1957). A deliberate search for an individual artistic vision, original visual means, synthesized subsequently into an original, deeply emotional style, led Nadir Abdurrahmanov to create such works as “The Arrest of 26 Baku Commissars”, “Lenin's Word” (1953), “Mournful News” (1958), “Industrial Landscape” (1954), “In the Highlands” (1957), “Morning in the Mountains” (1957), “Fresh Number of "Kirpi"” (1958).

Abdurrahmanov also went on creative trips to France, Italy, Norway, Bulgaria, North Korea, Iraq, Afghanistan and other countries. "New Korea" (1959), "Burgas Port" (1961), "Mountains. Yugoslavia" (1964), "Venice. Bridge" (1966), "Bergen. Norway" (1966), "Baghdad" (1972), "Street in Mosul" (1972), "Afghanistan" (1971), "Afghans" (1972) and other paintings were demonstrated in various exhibitions. His personal exhibitions were held in also Moscow (1960, 1976), Korea (1958) and Iraq (1978).

A large role in the artist’s work was played by a trip to the Democratic People's Republic of Korea in 1958. In the landscapes, portraits, sketches and drawings, the unique originality of the “country of morning freshness”, the beauty of its nature, the life of ordinary people of Korea, engaged in creative work for of the new society, were embodied. At the personal exhibitions “In Korea”, organized in Baku and Moscow, the best paintings and sketches from this series were shown. In such works as “Fishermen”, “Morning on the bridge”, “On the crossing”, “New Korea”, “In the agricultural cartel”, “In Keson”, “East Sea”, the artist achieved a broad artistic generalization.

In the early 60s. the artist made a trip to Lankaran and began work on the painting “Planting Rice”. At the same time, the painter turned to the topic of labor. The search for the courageously harsh, monumental language in painting was reflected in such canvases as “Constructions of the seven-year plan” and “Builders of Ali-Bayramli State District Power Station” and others. Among the famous works of Abdurrahmanov painted in different years - “Twilight in the Mountains”, "Chaltikbejaranlar"(1960), “Favorite Patterns”(1967), “Spring in the Mountains”(1970), “World of Firuza”, “Talysh Girl”(1970), “People of our Mountains”, “Talysh”(1967). A poetic perception of life is also characteristic of many of the painter's landscapes, which are dedicated to the mountainous regions of his native land: Lerik, Lachin, Shusha such are “Village in the Mountains”, “Lachin”, “Lerik. Spring”(1964), “Lake in the Mountains”, “On Lake Gara Gol”, “Minkend”, “Shusha”, etc.

The paintings and drawings of the Iraq-Afghanistan series were created by Abdurrahmanov recently off a trip to these countries and have become a new page in the creative biography of the Azerbaijani artist. One of the best paintings in this series is the "Twilight" painting. The emotional expressiveness of the painting is due to the rhythmic construction of space. The harmony of lines, and colours with particular poetry is expressed in such works as “Orange Grove”, “Mosul”, “Street in Baghdad”, “Sunny Day”, “Girl with Donkeys”, “Ghazni”, “Street in Kabul”, “Students from Kabul”,“ Afghans”,“ Seller of pottery”, “Portrait of the Artist Farad”, etc. Each of these works reveal the artist’s pictorial talent.

Since 1960, for 10 years, Abdurrahmanov headed the Union of Artists of Azerbaijan, in the same years he was elected as a deputy of the Supreme Council of the Republic from the Lachin region. In 1960, the artist was awarded the title of Honored Art Worker of the Azerbaijan SSR and in 1964, he was awarded the title of People's Artist of the Azerbaijan SSR. Nadir Abdurrahmanov, the head of the department of painting at Azerbaijan State Academy of Fine Arts (1983), professor at Azerbaijan State University of Culture and Arts (1984), was awarded the State Prize of Azerbaijan in 1985 for a series of works dedicated to the people of Karabakh.

July 26, 2008, Abdurrahmanov died in the 83rd year of his life. The 90th Anniversary Exhibition was held in Baku in 2015.
