= Yardley Chittick =

Charles Yardley Chittick (October 22, 1900 – July 18, 2008) was for several years the oldest living patent attorney in the United States. Yardley was also the oldest living member of the Beta Theta Pi fraternity.

== Biography ==
He was born in Newark, New Jersey.

Chittick was a graduate of Phillips Academy in Andover, Massachusetts, and was the first person to attend his 90th reunion in the school's 230-year history. While a student he got into a scuffle with fellow student and future actor Humphrey Bogart after he refused to polish Bogart's shoes. After Andover, Chittick went to MIT, where he majored in mechanical engineering, was a low-hurdle track champion, and a member of the Beta Theta Pifraternity. While a student at MIT, he was elected captain of the one-mile relay track team.

Chittick was once offered a job by Thomas Edison but turned it down, saying he thought it would be more fun to work for the Kroydon Company, a golf club manufacturer. He said Edison gave him a 150-question test before offering him the job. Several years before his death, he said he asked for a copy of the test from the Thomas Edison Museum and was shown the original with Edison's handwriting in the margins.

Chittick became registered as a patent attorney on February 1, 1934. He was admitted to practice before the U.S. Supreme Court on September 20, 1950.

He was married twice and had two sons. His first marriage ended in divorce, which involved a lawsuit that went to the Massachusetts Supreme Judicial Court based on a dispute over a complex settlement and the validity of a divorce filed in the U.S. Virgin Islands.

Chittick was the first recipient of the Beta Theta Pi fraternity's Beta Centenarian award in 2003. He attended the annual Beta Theta Pi conventions and was annually honored for his lifetime achievement, regularly taking the podium to sing the MIT fight song "Take Me Back to Tech".

Until his death, Chittick lived at the Pleasant View Retirement Home in Concord, New Hampshire, near St. Paul's School. He made occasional appearances at the nearby Franklin Pierce Law Center, which is recognized for its strong patent program, and which awarded Chittick an honorary degree in 2005.
