= Carl Aschan =

Swedish-born British intelligence officer and spy

- Born: Carl Nils Gunnar William Aschan; 6 May 1906
- Died: 27 July 2008 (aged 102)
- Occupations: Intelligence officer and spy
- Relatives: Nils Gabriel Djurklou (grandfather)

Carl Nils Gunnar William Aschan (6 May 1906 – 27 July 2008) was a Swedish-born British intelligence officer and spy during World War II.

Born at Örebro, Sweden, Aschan was the son of a Swedish judge who was also chief of police at Örebro; Carl's mother, Baroness Elsa Djurklou, was the daughter of Baron Nils Gabriel Djurklou. Around 1916 or 1917, his parents divorced, and his moved with his mother to Stockholm. Several years later, they moved to London, where he was educated at local schools and by a private tutor.

Aschan later helped to track down some of Adolf Hitler's associates following the defeat of Nazi Germany.
