= Donald Allen (cricketer) =

Australian cricketer

Personal information
- Born: 13 December 1926; Melbourne, Australia
- Died: 7 July 2008 (aged 81)

Domestic team information
- Years: Team
- 1950-1952: Victoria
- Source: Cricinfo, 2 December 2015

Donald Allen (13 December 1926 – 7 July 2008) was an Australian cricketer. He played five first-class cricket matches for Victoria between 1950 and 1952.

== See also ==
- List of Victoria first-class cricketers
