= Steve Peterson (racing executive) =

American racing executive (1950–2008)

Steve Peterson (1950 – July 15, 2008) was an American technical director for NASCAR. He joined NASCAR in 1995 and worked with them up until his death. During his time, he worked as a technical director and a safety adviser. He led to the improvement of safety barriers, neck and head restraints as well as seatbelts.

In 1982, Peterson worked as crew chief for driver Mark Martin. In 2006, he was awarded Society of Automotive Engineers Motorsports Achievement Award.

Peterson died of natural causes at his home in Concord, North Carolina. The NASCAR Confidential episode on "Race Control" for the 2008 Coca-Cola 600 at Lowe's Motor Speedway in Concord, NC that aired on Speed TV on July 20, 2008, was dedicated in his memory. A moment of silence was given for Peterson prior to the start of the 2008 Brickyard 400 at Indianapolis Motor Speedway on July 27.
