= Asafoetida =

Indian spice derived from Ferula roots

Asafoetida (/æsəˈfɛtɪdə/; also spelled asafetida) is the dried latex (gum oleoresin) exuded from the rhizome or tap root of several species of Ferula, perennial herbs of the carrot family. It is produced in Iran, Afghanistan, India, Central Asia and north-western China (Xinjiang). Different regions have different botanical sources.

Like other related resins, including galbanum and sagapenum, asafoetida was known in Greco-Roman antiquity. Its historical use partly overlaps with that of the now-extinct silphium, a plant highly valued in the ancient Mediterranean world for its reputed medicinal and culinary properties. Asafoetida is frequently mentioned in Ayurvedic texts, later in Arabo-Persian medical treatises, in medieval herbals, in the literature of traditional Chinese medicine, and in the pharmacopoeias of the early modern period.

The taxonomy of plants producing asafoetida is complex and has been subject to differing interpretations. The resin is most commonly associated with Ferula assa-foetida and Ferula foetida, which were long treated as synonyms. Ferula narthex is also frequently cited as a source. Additional Ferula species are mentioned in the specialised literature, although they appear to be of lesser economic importance and may differ substantially in their phytochemical composition. In many languages, the same term is used to refer both to the resin and to the plants from which it is derived.

In traditional medical systems, including Ayurveda, Unani medicine, and Western phytotherapy, asafoetida has been used for a variety of purposes, particularly in relation to the gastrointestinal and respiratory systems. The resin has been investigated in pharmacological research, and a range of biological activities has been reported. Its chemical composition includes compounds such as ferulic acid, sesquiterpene coumarins, and organosulfur compounds, which are known to exhibit biological activity.

As a culinary ingredient, asafoetida is primarily used in Indian and Middle Eastern cuisines, where it is employed to complement or substitute for alliaceous ingredients such as garlic and onion. Its use in the West has historically been limited, largely because of its odour, although it is included in certain products such as Worcestershire sauce. Beyond food, asafoetida has also been used in perfumery, mainly as a fixative, and in some agricultural contexts as a plant protection product, including applications as a natural pesticide.

Historically, Afghanistan and Iran have been the principal producers of asafoetida, exporting most of their production to India in raw form. In India, the resin is processed and packaged and is partly re-exported, sometimes in blended forms, to other markets. Since 2020, efforts have been undertaken in India to establish domestic cultivation, notably in Himachal Pradesh, in response to increasing internal demand.

== Characteristics ==
=== Description ===
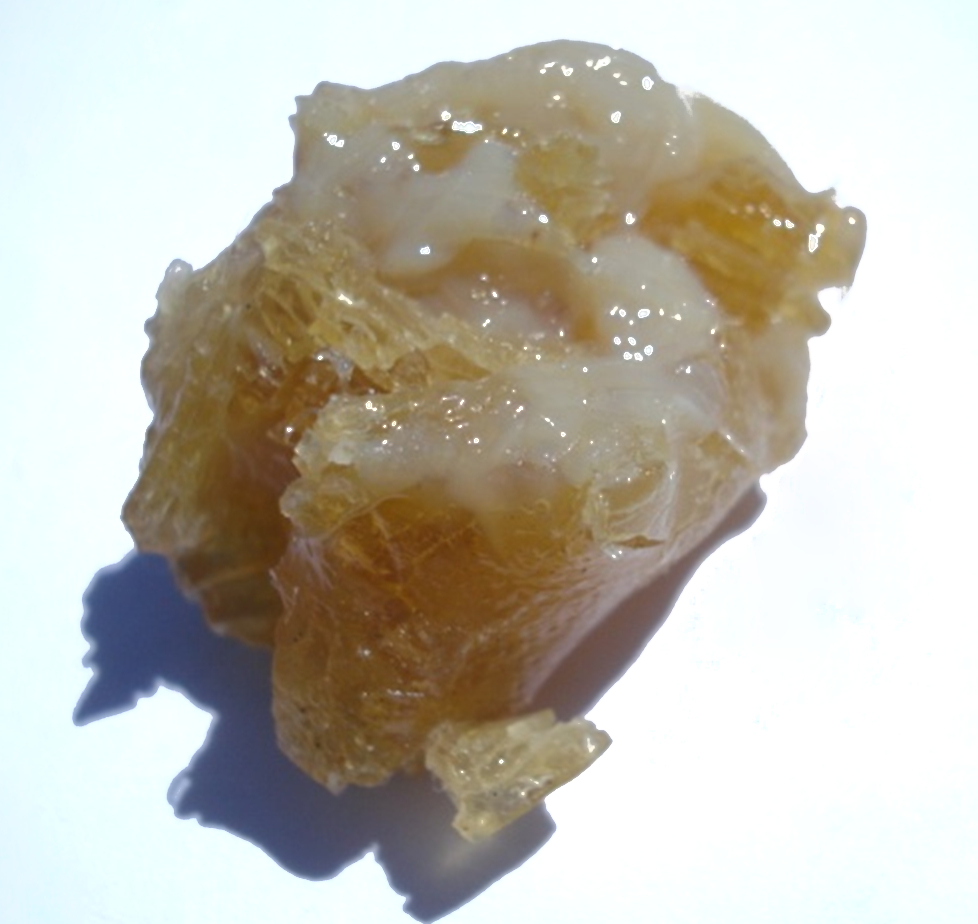
Piece of gum-resin of Iranian origin, drying.

Asafoetida is an oleo-gum-resin obtained primarily from the taproot, and occasionally from the rhizome and the stem, of several species of the genus Ferula, notably Ferula assa-foetida, Ferula foetida, and Ferula narthex. It is found in irregularly shaped pieces of varying size. Externally, the resin is yellowish to brownish pink. The fractured surface is conchoidal, whitish or milky white, translucent, and nacreous, with a waxy lustre. When exposed to light and air, a freshly fractured surface may develop a violet-red or peach-blossom red colouration within a few hours; this colouration gradually fades over days or weeks, turning yellowish brown or pinkish. Asafoetida is fusible and flammable, burning in air with a white flame and producing abundant smoke. It has an acrid, bitter taste and a strong, alliaceous odour. The odour is primarily attributed to the presence of organosulfur compounds.

Asafoetida is commercially available in three main forms. The form known as "tears" is considered the purest and consists of round or flattened grains measuring approximately 5 to 30 mm in diameter, typically grey or dull yellow in colour. The mass form is more common and consists of agglomerated tears, often mixed with fragments of root and soil. The paste form is soft and sticky and likewise contains varying amounts of foreign material.

=== Commercial varieties ===
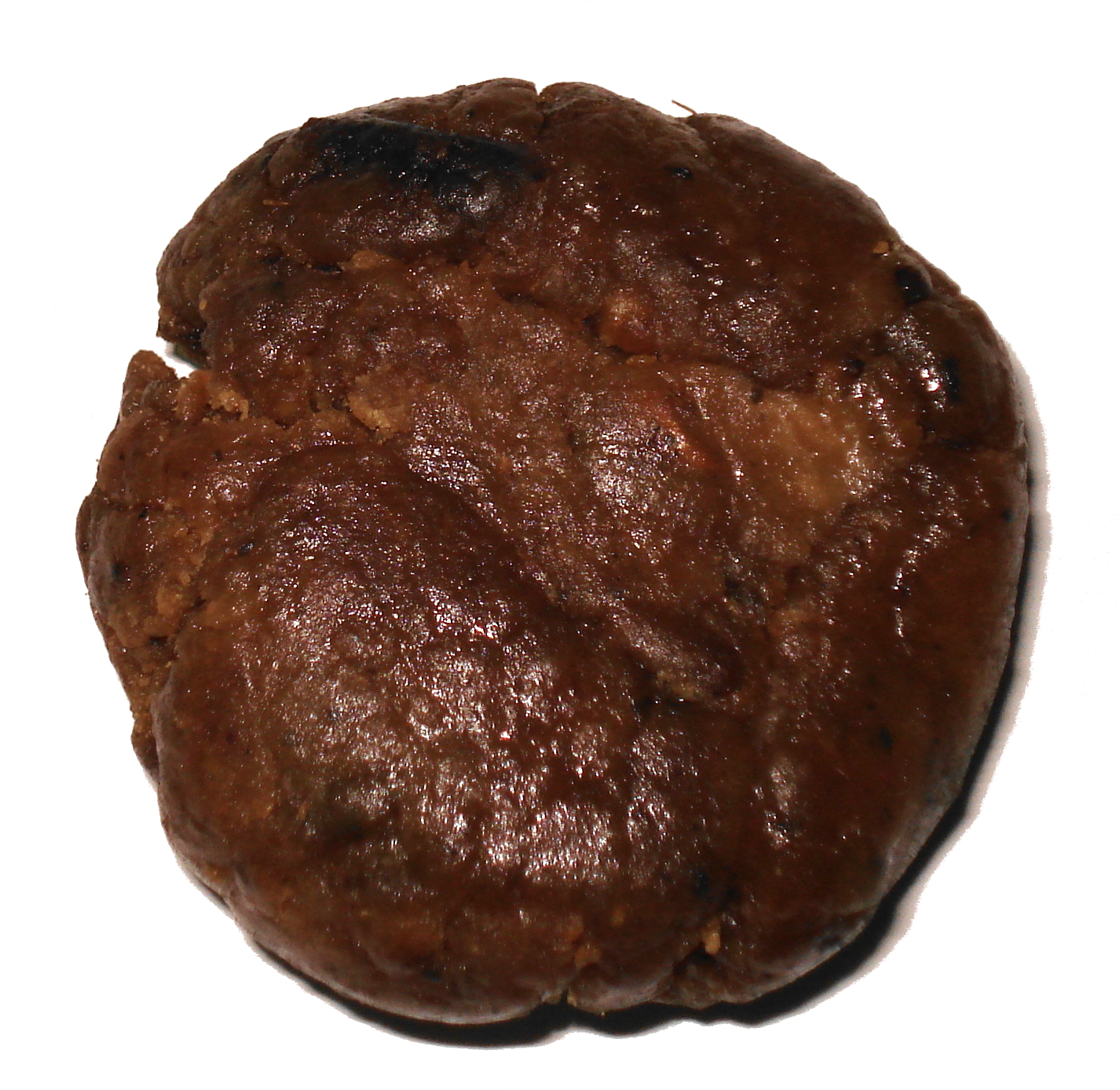
Mass asafoetida in Pakistan.

In the Indian market, asafoetida is sold in several forms that are subject to distinct classifications, with prices generally reflecting differences in purity and organoleptic characteristics.

A primary distinction is made between Hing and Hingra. Hing is generally regarded as the higher-grade product and is more aromatic. It is typically pale in colour and soluble in water. Hingra is darker in appearance and dissolves in oil. Hing is commonly associated with F. assa-foetida and F. alliacea, while Hingra is mainly derived from F. foetida, and to a lesser extent from F. assa-foetida and F. narthex.

Hing is further divided into categories based on geographic origin and physical characteristics. Resins originating from Iran are known as Irani Hing (formerly Abushaharee Hing), reflecting their historical shipment through the port of Bushehr on the Persian Gulf. These resins are typically dry and may contain woody residues. A milder variety, brown in colour, is obtained from a horizontal incision in the stem and may include stem fragments. A more bitter and often translucent variety is produced by incising the root. Resins from Afghanistan are referred to as Pathani Hing or, less commonly, Kandaharee Hing, after the province of Kandahar. These products are generally agglomerated and moist, with a stronger and more bitter taste and odour. Several commercial types are recognised, including Naya Chal, Naya Zamin, Charas, Galmin, Khawlal, Kabuli, Shabandi, and Hadda, of which Hadda is described as particularly pungent and is typically sold at a higher price. The product known as Bandhani Hing is not a distinct variety but a composite product prepared to facilitate culinary use.

Hingra, which is less commonly used in India, has historically been associated with lower-cost markets and export trade. It may originate from Iran or Afghanistan and is generally the form most often encountered in Europe. In commercial terminology, distinctions are sometimes made between asa foetida electa in granis (or in lacrimis, in tears), in massis (or amygdaloides, in mass), and asa foetida petraea (in stones). The last category, which is uncommon, consists of irregular, angular pieces resembling dolomite and may represent an adulterated product with a high gypsum content.

=== Related products ===
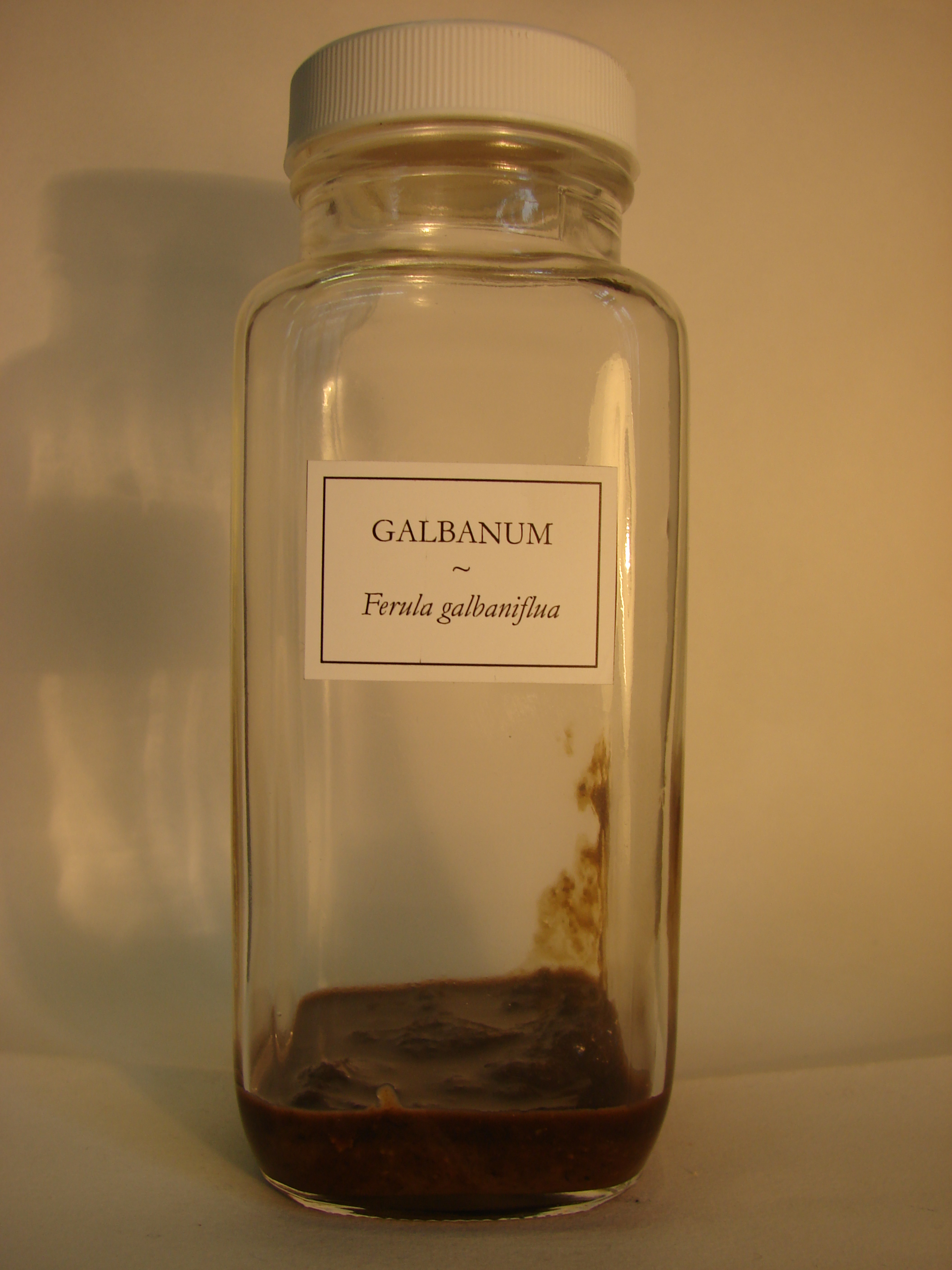
Galbanum extracted from Ferula gummosa.

The gum-resins produced by species of the genus Ferula have been known since antiquity and were frequently confused with one another in historical sources. Despite similarities in appearance and traditional use, these substances are obtained through different extraction methods and show notable differences in their phytochemical composition. Some of these gum-resins have occasionally been marketed under the name asafoetida.

Galbanum typically occurs as irregular, almost translucent "tears", which may agglutinate into a yellow-brown mass that becomes soft and sticky at body temperature. Ferula gummosa (syn. Ferula galbaniflua) is generally regarded as its principal source, although the resin is also obtained from Ferula rubricaulis, Ferula kokanica, and Ferula varia. The resin exudes naturally at the base of the stem and from the leaf sheaths, and incisions are often unnecessary. Galbanum has a strong, distinctive odour, sometimes described as heavy or cloying. Although it was recommended for medicinal use by authors such as Hippocrates and Pliny the Elder, galbanum is now used mainly in perfumery.

Sagapenum is a gum-resin with an odour similar to that of asafoetida. It is red or yellow externally and white internally. Also known as "seraphic gum", it is obtained by making grooves in the stem near the leaves. Sagapenum is produced primarily from Ferula persica and Ferula szowitziana.

Ammoniacum gum continues to be used in traditional medicine, although its properties are not well documented, as well as in perfumery and in illumination, where it serves as an adhesive for gold leaf. It is most commonly associated with Dorema ammoniacum, a species reassigned in 2015 to the genus Ferula on the basis of phylogenetic evidence. The term ammoniacum gum is also applied to resins obtained from Ferula orientalis, Ferula tingitana (Moroccan ammoniacum gum), and Ferula marmarica (Cyrenaican ammoniacum gum).

Sumbul, or "musk root", refers to the root of Ferula moschata (syn. Ferula sumbul) or Ferula diversivittata (syn. Ferula suaveolens). It is marketed as spongy slices that appear marbled white and brownish grey in cross-section. The associated resin, known as "sumbul resin", exudes from stems and roots through natural fissures caused by temperature variation or by damage from animals or insects.

== Names ==
In most languages, the names given to the resin also apply to the plants that produce it.

=== Spelling and etymology ===
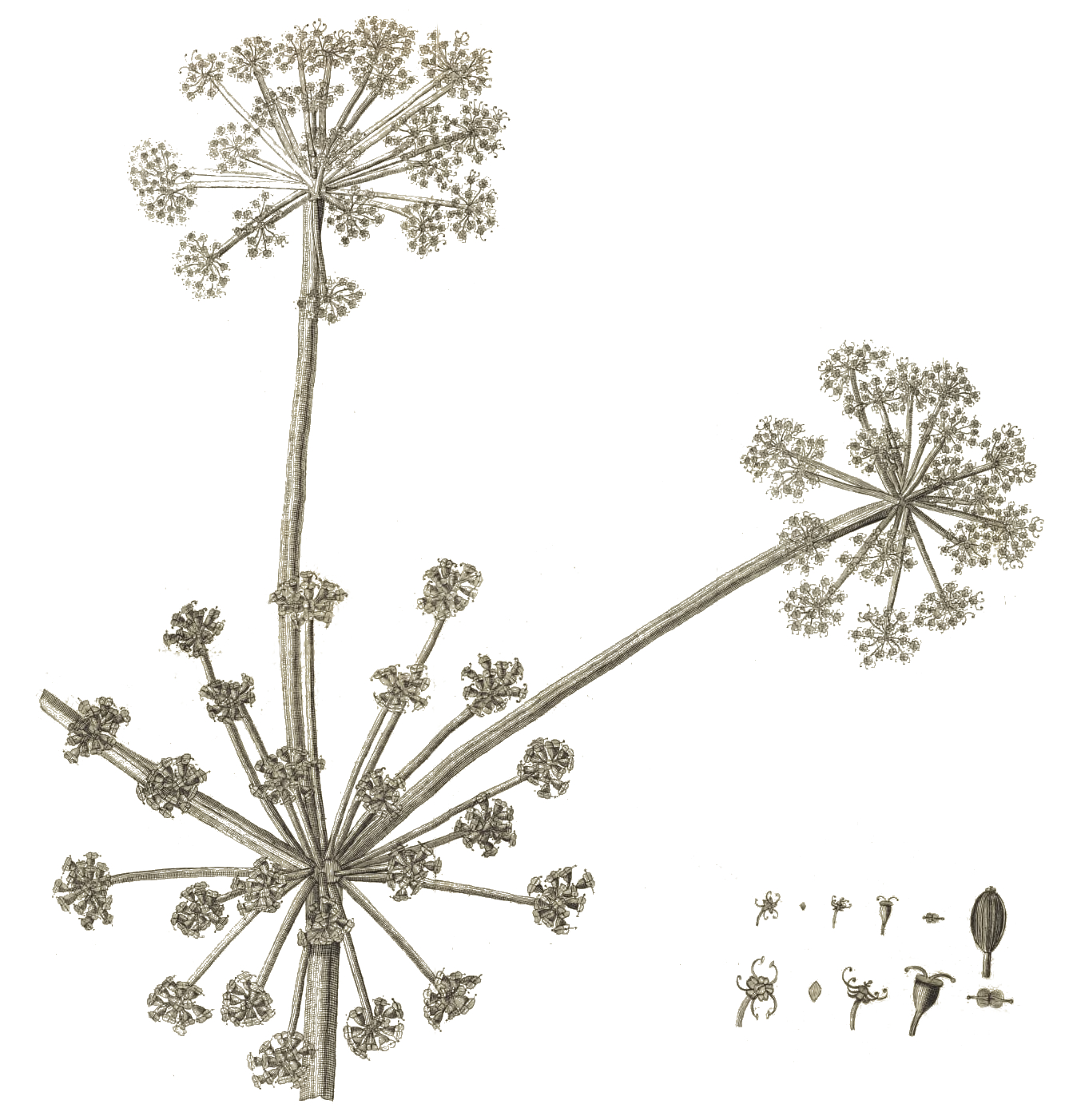
Description of a plant yielding asa fœtida, letter from John Hope to Joseph Banks in 1784.

The term "asafoetida" (French: ase fétide, very rarely asse fétide) entered English, French, and Occitan through borrowing from Medieval Latin asa fœtida. This designation remains in use in scholarly contexts in several European languages. The word has given rise to numerous orthographic and typographic variants, including "asa-fœtida", "asa fétida", "assa fœtida", "assa fetida", and "asafœtida", among others. The origin of the term has long been debated, and no single etymology has been universally accepted.

The element "fetid" (from foetidus) refers to the resin’s odour and served to distinguish it from the "sweet asa" described by medieval Arab physicians. The epithet has been attested since the 14th century. In Old and Middle French, it was later replaced in common usage by the synonym "puant" ("stinking"). The terms "asafoetida" and "fetid asa" have consistently retained a learned or technical connotation, whereas popular usage favoured more colloquial names such as "devil's dung".

The earliest known occurrence in Latin of asa is generally traced to the translations of Dioscorides produced by Constantine the African in the 11th century. The most widely cited hypothesis connects this term, along with its variants assa and asca, to the silphium of antiquity. This plant was known to the Greeks as σίλφιον (silphion), a word whose own etymology is uncertain. It entered Latin as sirpe, and its sap was referred to as lac sirpicium ("milk of silphium"), later shortened to laserpicium or laserpitium. These forms subsequently developed into laser-picium through reinterpretation involving pix (pitch). Once established as an independent term, laser or lasar is thought to have evolved into asar by deglutination, and finally into asa through regular morphological adaptation.

An alternative explanation derives asa from the Persian term azā, meaning mastic. In Persian, however, this word refers specifically to the resin of the mastic tree, and the names used for asafoetida and its source plants differ. Another proposal links the term to Persian asā, meaning "stick" or "club", a meaning that parallels the Latin ferula and may allude to the tall stature of the plant or the use of its dried stem as a staff or cudgel. Other authors have suggested a Semitic origin, deriving the word from roots meaning "to heal". In this interpretation, the Arabic asâ and Hebrew asah would render asafoetida as a "fetid remedy". An Ancient Greek derivation from ἄση (asē), meaning "disgust" or "nausea", has also been proposed, in reference to the substance’s emetic properties. Finally, a Sumerian origin has been suggested by Reginald Campbell Thompson, who, in The Assyrian Herbal, identified the term aš in texts dating to the 7th century BCE as a possible early designation of asafoetida. In this view, the term would have been transmitted into later languages through Greek and Arabic, as occurred with the names of several other plants.

=== Other languages ===
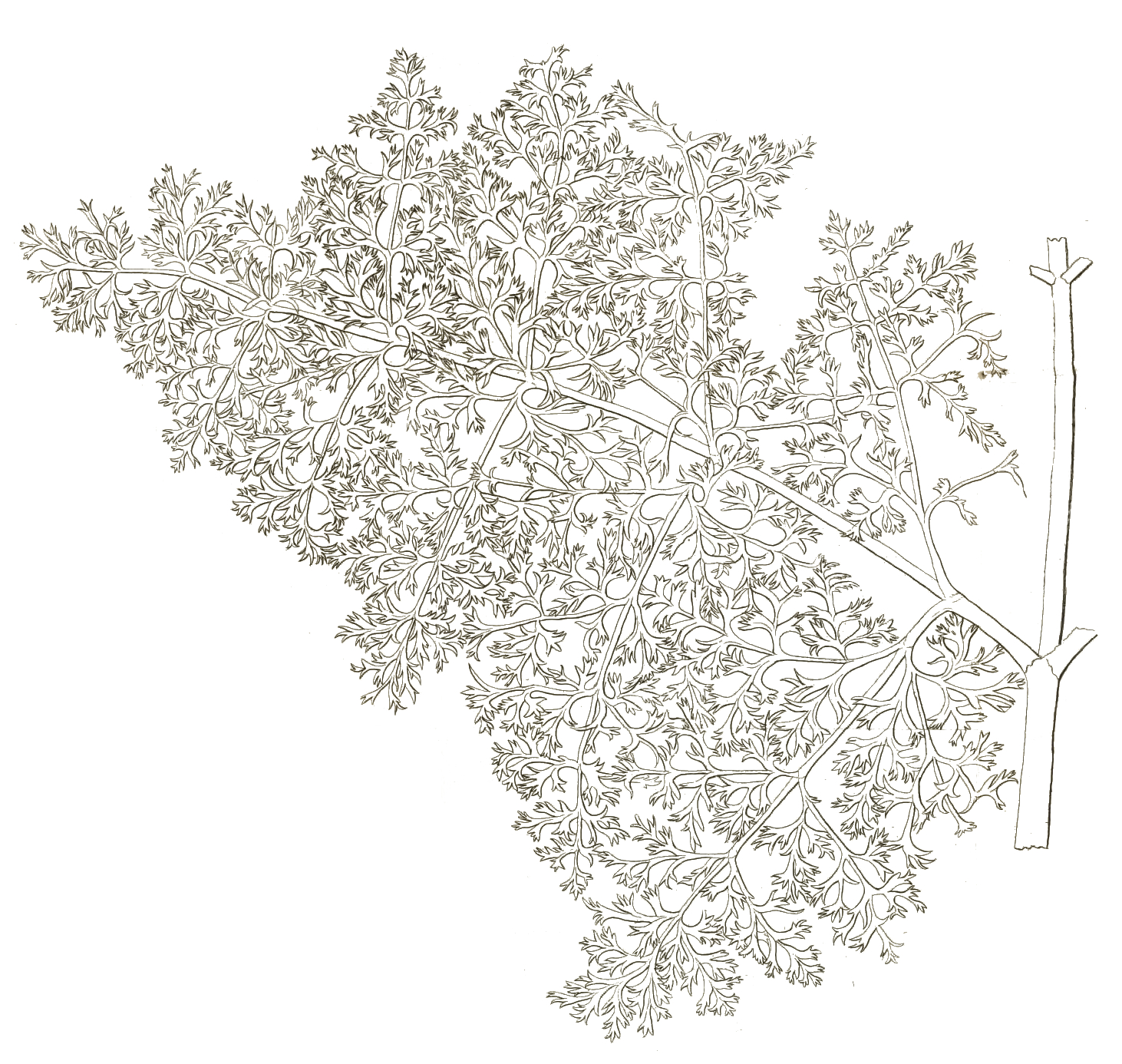
Letter of John Hope: plant native to Gilan in Persia, and successfully cultivated in Edinburgh.

In the European languages, the resin is designated either by forms derived from its Latin name or by direct translations of it. In English, these include asafœtida, stinking gum and stinking assa; in German, Asafötida, Asant, or Stinkasant; and in Italian, Spanish, and Portuguese, assafétida and related orthographic variants. In Russian, the term is аса́фети́да (asafetida). In several Germanic languages, names equivalent to the French expression "devil's dung" (merde du diable) are also used, such as English devil's dung, German Teufelsdreck, Dutch duivelsdrek, Swedish dyvelsträck, Danish dyvelsdræk, and Norwegian dyvelsdrekk.

In Persian, the resin is designated by terms derived from Middle Persian (Pahlavi) *anguzad, with classical forms including انگوزه [angūza], انگژد [angužad], انگیان [anguyān], and انگدان [angudān]. These forms are derived from the Proto-Indo-Iranian root *anga- ("bent, curved"), extended by semantic development to "branch", combined with the Proto-Iranian element *ǰátu ("gum, resin"). In Modern Persian, the substance is commonly known as آنقوزه [ānqūzeh] or آنغوزه [ânğuze], and is also referred to as کما [koma] or خوراکما [khorakma].

These Iranian terms were subsequently borrowed into several other languages, including Classical Arabic أنجدان [ʾanjudān], Classical Armenian անգուժատ [angužat], and Middle Chinese 阿魏 [āwèi].

The Sanskrit term हिङ्गु [hiṅgú] may share this Iranian origin, although the direction of borrowing has also been debated. It is the source of the terms used in most of the languages of India, including Hindi हींग [hīṅg] and Urdu ہینگ [hīng]. The term was also borrowed into Chinese as 形虞 [xíngyú].

In the Semitic languages, a distinct set of terms was used to designate both the plant and its resin. These include Mishnaic Hebrew חלתית [ḥiltīt] or חילתית [ḥīltīt], Aramaic חלתיתא [ḥiltīṯā], and Syriac ܚܠܬܝܬܐ [ḥeltīṯā], which was later borrowed into Arabic as حلتيت [ḥiltīt]. These principal terms were cited and transcribed in altered forms by early European authors. Garcia de Orta refers to altiht or anjuden among Arab-Persian speakers and to imgu in India, while Engelbert Kaempfer describes in Persia a plant known as هِينكِسَه [hingiseh].

== Historical aspects ==
Some authors have proposed that asafoetida was already included in ancient pharmacopoeias and may be identifiable in some of the earliest medical texts. It has been suggested, for example, that it is mentioned in the Ebers Papyrus, an Egyptian medical treatise dating to the 16th century BCE, where it appears in treatments for severe burns and in ophthalmic collyriums administered with a vulture feather. The resin may also have been among the medicinal plants known and cultivated in Mesopotamia. Its inclusion in the foundational texts of Ayurveda indicates that knowledge of the substance was well established in Asia prior to the Common Era.

=== Substitute for silphium ===
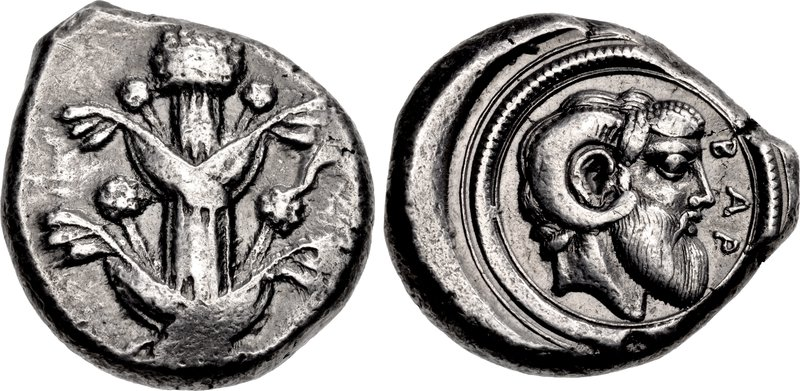
Silphium (left) depicted on a coin minted in Barca in Cyrenaica in the 5th century BCE

The history of asafoetida is often discussed in relation to that of ancient silphium, an unidentified plant whose sap was a major source of wealth for Cyrenaica (in present-day Libya). Valued both as a luxury spice and for its reputed medicinal properties, silphium held a prominent place in the ancient Mediterranean world. Although its precise botanical identity remains uncertain, it is generally considered that asafoetida was assimilated to silphium and entered the Mediterranean sphere following the conquests of Alexander the Great in the 4th century BCE.

Asafoetida was brought to Europe by an expedition of Alexander the Great, who, after returning from a trip to northeastern ancient Persia, thought that he had found a plant almost identical to the famed silphium of Cyrene in North Africa—though less tasty. Dioscorides, in the first century, wrote, "the Cyrenaic kind, even if one just tastes it, at once arouses a humour throughout the body and has a very healthy aroma, so that it is not noticed on the breath, or only a little; but the Median [Iranian] is weaker in power and has a nastier smell." Nevertheless, it could be substituted for silphium in cooking, which was fortunate, because a few decades after Dioscorides' time, the true silphium of Cyrene became extinct, and asafoetida became more popular amongst physicians, as well as cooks.

In his Anabasis, Arrian quotes Aristobulus of Cassandreia, who accompanied the Macedonian army in Asia and reported that beyond the Caucasus—here referring to the Hindu Kush, crossed by Alexander in the spring of 329 BCE—nothing grew except "the terebinth and the silphium". Strabo similarly relates in his Geography that soldiers suffering from hunger were forced to eat raw meat for lack of fuel, but that their digestion was aided by silphium, "which grew in abundance in the country".

According to the account of Pliny the Elder, the Cyrenaican silphium had become rare and may even have disappeared entirely: "For several years it has not been found in Cyrenaica, because the farmers of the pastures, finding greater profit in it, allow their flocks to graze in the places where this plant grows". Asafoetida is commonly identified with the "silphium of Media", which appears to have gradually replaced the Cyrenaican product in its various uses. Strabo notes in this respect that "another plant that Media also produces is silphium, and the sap extracted from it, called Median sap, although usually far inferior to the Cyrenaican sap, sometimes nonetheless surpasses it".

Dioscorides describes the method of resin extraction and draws attention to differences in quality and odour between the Cyrenaican product and its eastern counterparts:

The sap [of silphium] is extracted from the root and stem by incision. The best sap is reddish and translucent; it has the smell of myrrh and a strong fragrance, is neither greenish nor unpleasant in taste, and quickly turns white. One should know that the Cyrenaican sap, even when tasted in very small quantity, immediately induces perspiration of the whole body and has a very sweet fragrance, so that the taster's breath smells only briefly. The saps of Media and Syria are decidedly weaker and their odour is rather foetid.

Pliny likewise emphasises the inferior quality of these substitutes and mentions frequent adulteration: "For a long time now we have received no other laser than that which grows abundantly in Persia, or in Media, or in Armenia; but it is far inferior to that of Cyrenaica; and even then it is adulterated with gum, or with sagapenum, or with crushed broad bean".

Roman and Byzantine medical authors writing after Dioscorides continued to cite silphium in their works. Galen (2nd century), Oribasius (4th century), Caelius Aurelianus (5th century), Aëtius of Amida, Alexander of Tralles (6th century), and Paul of Aegina (7th century) describe the resin and its properties, but largely reproduce earlier accounts without substantial additions. Despite its scarcity, Cyrenaican silphium appears to have retained a primarily therapeutic role, and the question of its replacement by Persian resin was not definitively resolved. Some authors mention alternative preparations depending on availability: Soranus of Ephesus (2nd century), for example, gives recipes for four emmenagogue remedies, only two of which include silphium.

The latest generally accepted evidence for the presence of silphium in Libya comes from two letters by Synesius of Cyrene, bishop of Cyrenaica, dated to the early 5th century. He refers to a silphium plant grown in his brother's garden and later to sap sent among other "luxury gifts" to a correspondent in Constantinople. These references suggest that the plant may by then have been rare in the wild and maintained primarily through cultivation.

Asafoetida is also mentioned numerous times in Jewish literature, such as the Mishnah. Maimonides also writes in the Mishneh Torah "In the rainy season, one should eat warm food with much spice, but a limited amount of mustard and asafoetida [חִלְתִּית chiltit]."

During the Italian Renaissance, asafoetida was used as part of the exorcism ritual.

While it is generally forgotten now in Europe, it is widely used in India. Asafoetida is mentioned in the Bhagavata Purana (7:5:23-24), which states that one must not have eaten hing before worshipping the deity. Asafoetida is eaten by Brahmins and Jains. Devotees of the Hare Krishna movement also use hing in their food, as they are not allowed to consume onions or garlic. Their food has to be presented to Lord Krishna for sanctification (to become Prasadam) before consumption and onions and garlic cannot be offered to Krishna.

=== Sweet asa and asafoetida ===
Arab physicians of the Islamic Golden Age, drawing in part on Greek medical literature, attributed to asafoetida properties similar to those ascribed to silphium by Dioscorides. Yuhanna ibn Masawayh (Johannitius), Rhazes (9th century), Avicenna (11th century), and later Averroes (12th century), Serapion the Younger, and Ibn al-Baitar (13th century), distinguished between two types of medicinal resins: one described as sweet-smelling and pleasant, and the other as having a strong and unpleasant odour. These authors also provided indications of the geographical origin of the plants producing them; all these named regions lie between the Caspian Sea and the Indus River, in modern Iran, Afghanistan and Pakistan. According to Abū Ḥanīfa, as cited by Ibn al-Baitar, the plant grows in the sandy plains between Bost and Kikan; for Abū Manṣūr, the highest-quality variety comes from Merv; for Istakhri, asafoetida is produced in large quantities in the desert between Sistan and Makran; whereas, according to Al-Idrisi, it originates in a region at the confluence of the Helmand and the Arghandab. Ibn al-Baitar and Fakhr al-Din al-Razi described some positive medicinal effects on the respiratory system.

Arabo-Persian medical knowledge was transmitted to medieval Europe through the School of Salerno, and the term asa entered Latin in the 11th century through the writings of Constantine the African. The Circa instans, attributed to Platearius, is generally regarded as the earliest attestation of the compound assa fetida, under which name the resin is subsequently cited by Albert the Great and Arnau de Vilanova. By the late 13th century, a substantial tradition of illustrated herbals had developed under the title Tractatus de Herbis, later translated into French in the 15th century as the Livre des simples médecines. Asafoetida is consistently included in these works, although its depiction is typically schematic and not based on direct observation.

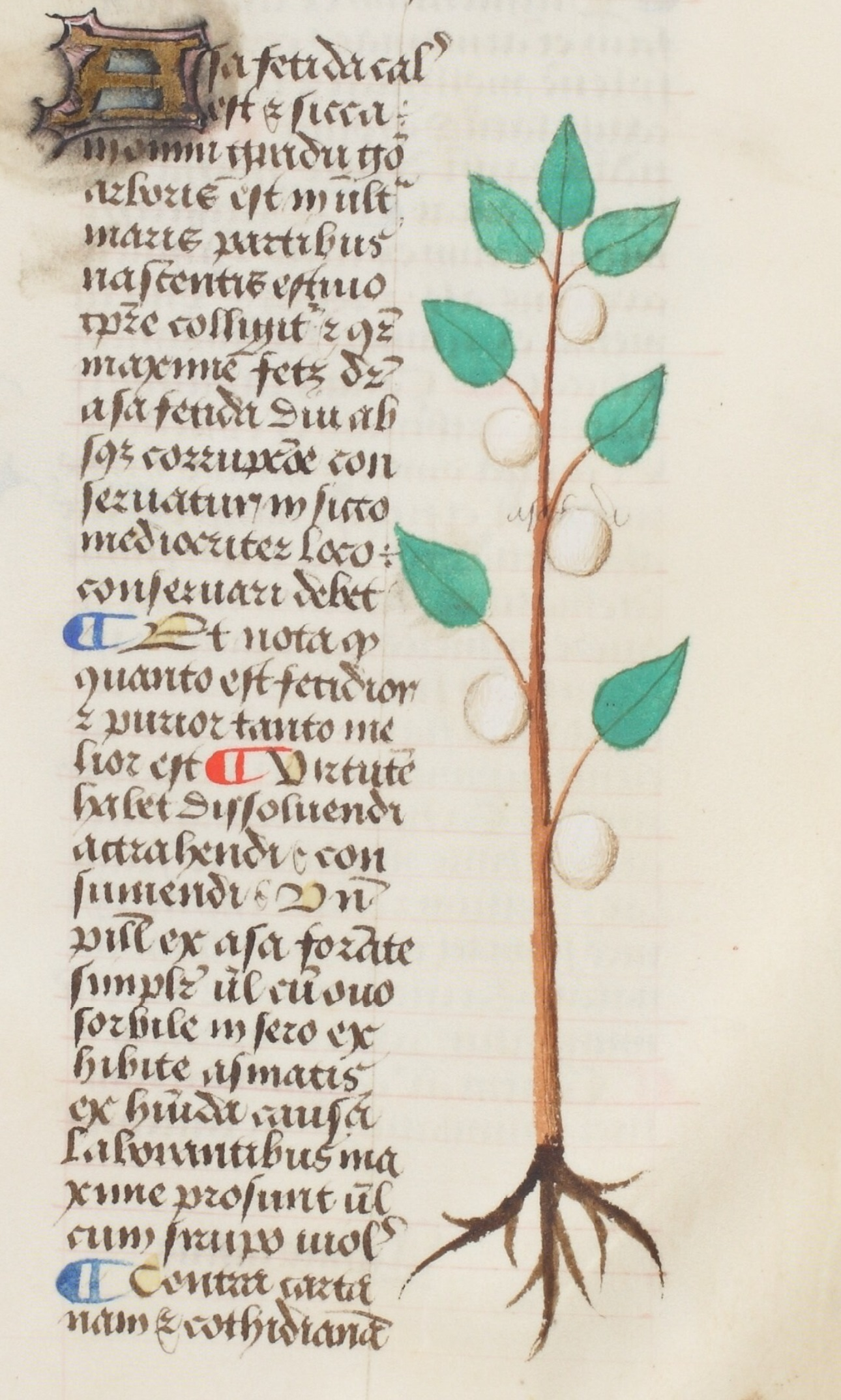
"Assa fetida", in a 1458 copy of the Tractatus de Herbis. Biblioteca Estense of Modena.

In the early modern period, likely as a result of a misinterpretation of Ludovico di Varthema's description of the benzoin of Sumatra, several authors identified this resin with the "Cyrenaic juice" described by Dioscorides and with the Arab notion of a sweet asa. Although this identification was disputed from an early stage and is not supported by botanical or biogeographical evidence, it nonetheless gained wide acceptance and persisted for an extended period. As a result, some dictionaries and pharmaceutical reference works continue to list assa dulcis as a synonym for benzoin resin.

=== Travelers' accounts ===
The earliest detailed account by a European observer of asafoetida is generally attributed to the Portuguese physician Garcia de Orta, who was residing in Goa in India in the mid-16th century. In his Colloquies on the Simples and Drugs of India, published in 1563, he discusses—through a dialogue with the fictional interlocutor Ruano—the uncertainty and confusion surrounding the names applied to the resin. Although he was unable to determine the method of extraction or to identify the plant from which the gum was obtained, Orta established that it was transported to India from Khorasan via the port of Hormuz. He also distinguished asafoetida from laserpitium, which he argued had been conflated by ancient and Arabic authors, and rejected the then-recent proposal equating it with benzoin. In addition, he noted that asafoetida was widely available in India and commonly used both medicinally and as a culinary seasoning.

To me, the most unpleasant odor in the world is that of asafoetida; yet greens seasoned with it do not smell bad. You should not be surprised by this, for onions have a very bad smell, and yet dishes seasoned with them are very good. The truth is that there are many habits when it comes to odors.

— Garcia de Orta, Coloquio setimo: Do Altiht

About a century later, the German traveller Johan Albrecht de Mandelslo visited Persia and India and recorded observations on a variety of unfamiliar products encountered there. In his travel account published in 1669, he reports that hing, referred to by European druggists and apothecaries as "asafoetida", originated chiefly in Persia and was produced by two distinct plants:

One grows like a shrub and has small leaves like those of rue; the other resembles a turnip, and its greenness is like that of fig leaves. It grows preferably in stony and dry places, and its gum begins to exude toward the end of summer, so that it must be harvested in autumn.

— Johann Albrecht von Mandelslo, The Voyages and Travels of J. Albert de Mandelslo into the East-Indies

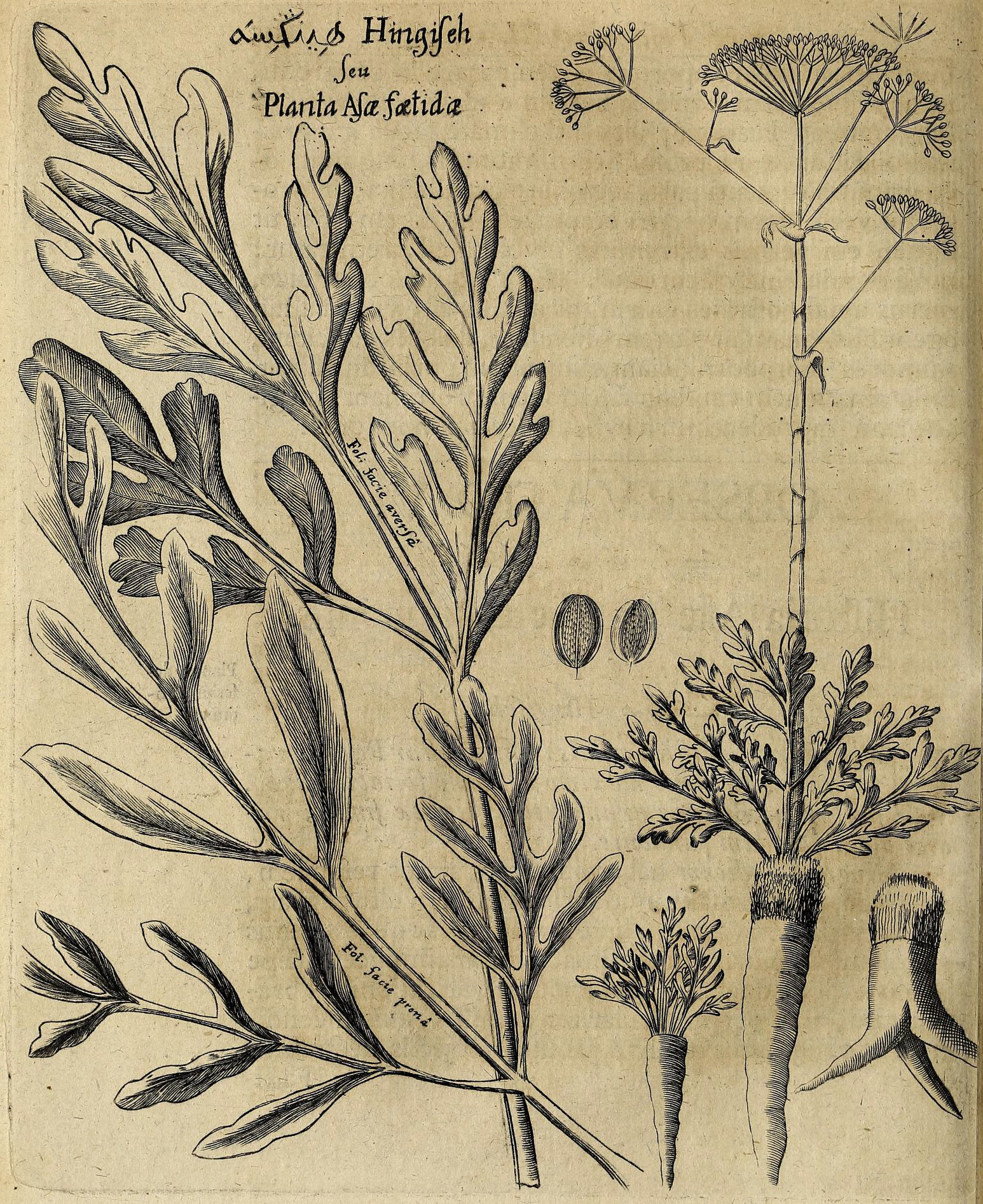
Plate depicting Hingiseh or asafoetida in Kaempfer's work.

The first comprehensive botanical description of the plant is generally credited to the German naturalist Engelbert Kaempfer. After travelling to Isfahan in 1684 as part of a mission associated with King Charles XI of Sweden, Kaempfer entered the service of the Dutch East India Company as a physician. During the four years he spent in Persia, he gathered extensive observations on the region’s natural history. His work Amoenitatum exoticarum ("Exotic pleasures"), published in 1712, includes a full chapter devoted to "Asa foetida". This chapter is illustrated with a detailed plate of the plant and provides a systematic description of the successive stages of resin extraction as practised in the village of Disguun, located in a mountainous area along the Persian Gulf, based on observations made in 1687.

=== Botanical discoveries and debates ===
In the system of biological nomenclature established in the mid-18th century by Carl Linnaeus, the plant identified as producing asafoetida was assigned the binomial name Ferula assa-foetida. At that time, the circumscription of the species was based solely on the description provided by Engelbert Kaempfer, and subsequent botanical illustrations largely reproduced the plate published in Amoenitatum exoticarum. In the 1840s, however, several additional asafoetida-producing plants were discovered and described independently. Ferula foetida (initially described as Scorodosma foetidum) was collected by Alexander Lehmann in the desert plains near the Aral Sea and later formally described by Alexander von Bunge, who also observed the species in the vicinity of Herat. Ferula narthex was identified by Hugh Falconer in the Astor valley of Kashmir. In Persia, between Jandaq and Yazd, Friedrich Alexander Buhse collected material later recognised as representing Ferula alliacea.

Herbarium specimens used for the typification of the three main species
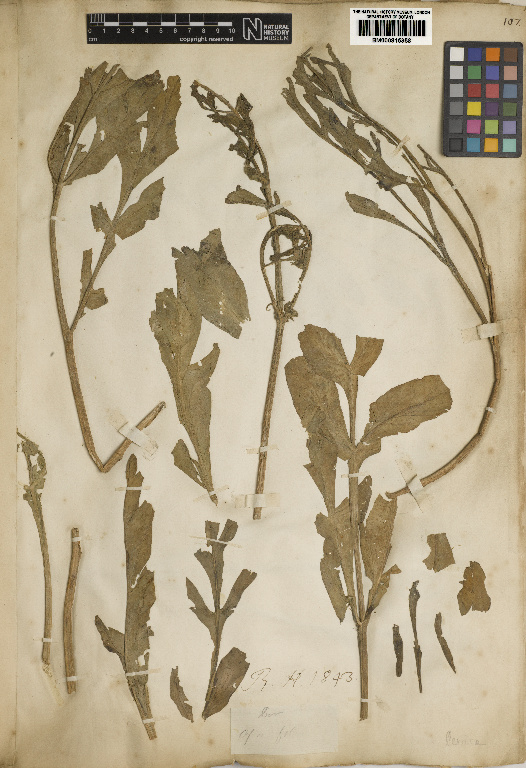

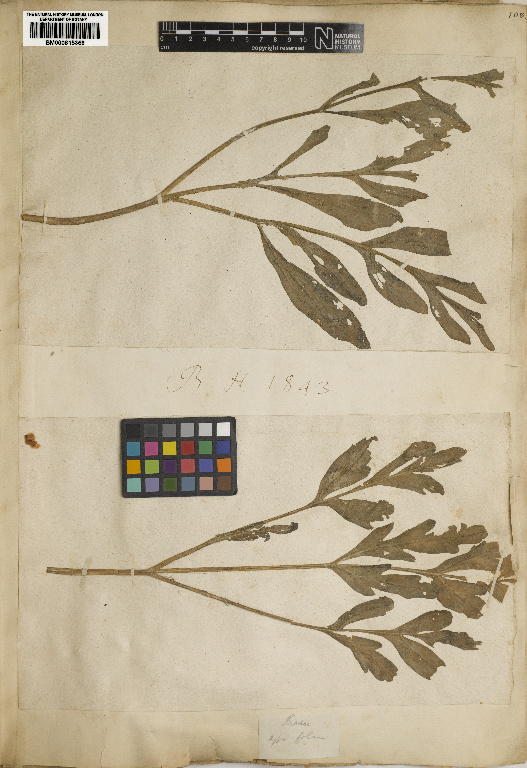

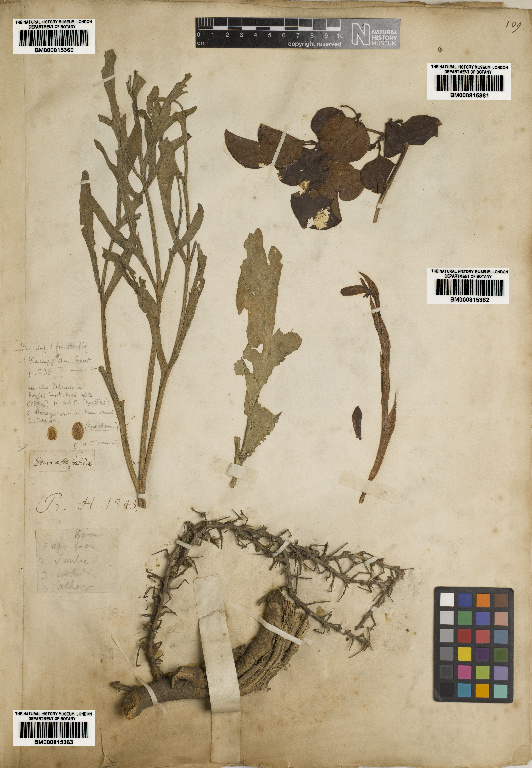

Holotype of Ferula assa-foetida L., collected by Kaempfer in Iran, 1691-1692, Natural History Museum.

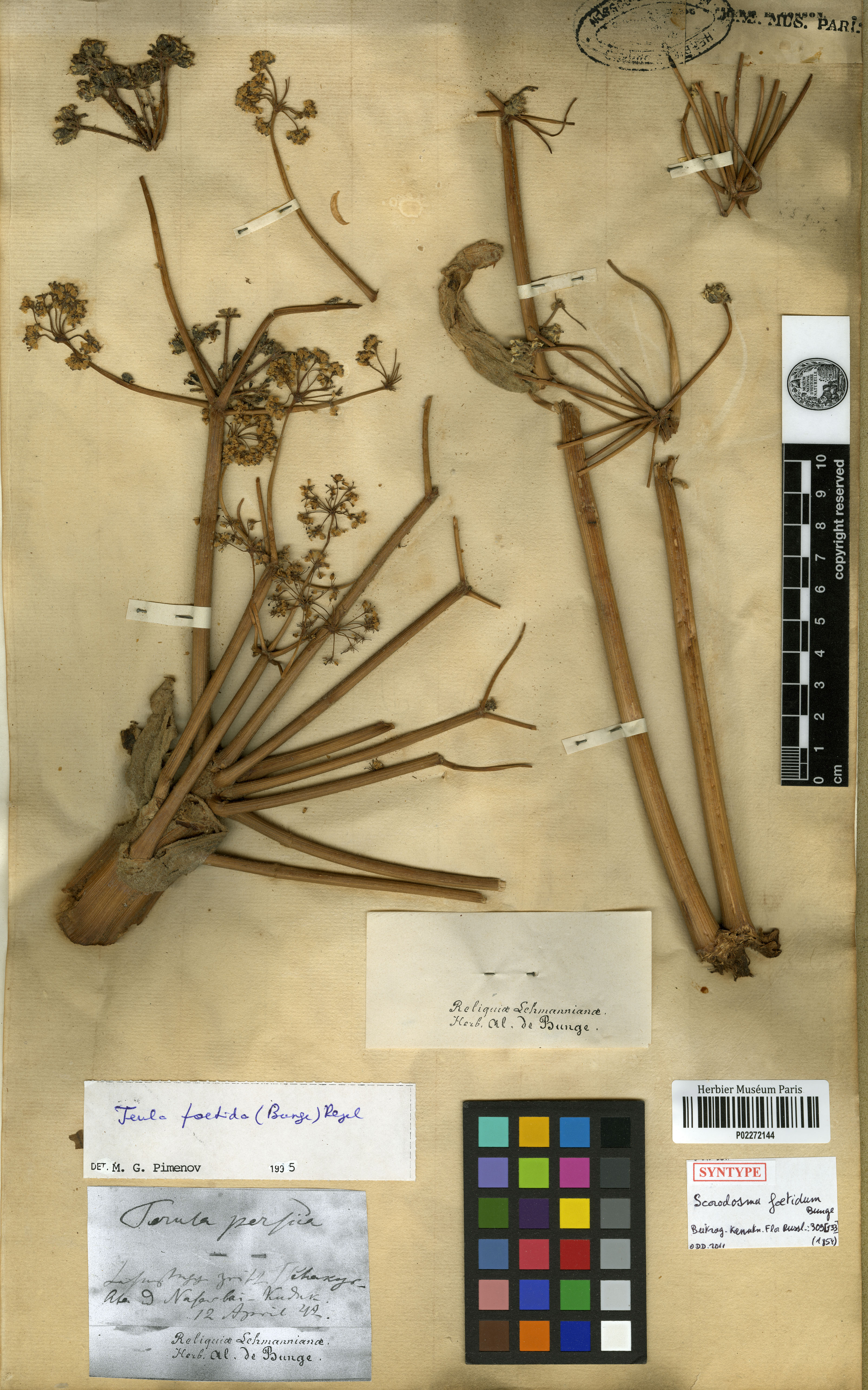

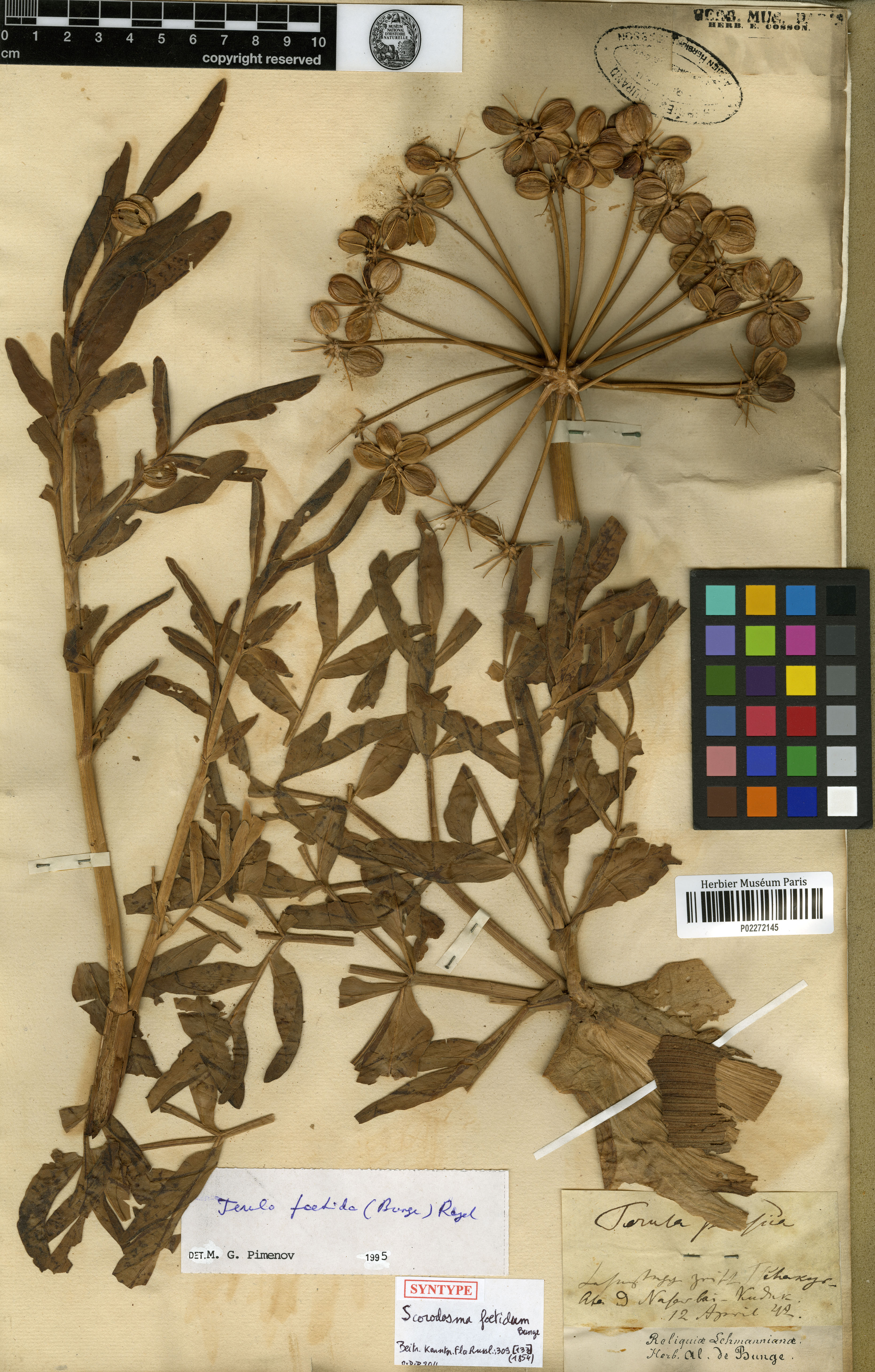

Syntype of Scorodosma foetidum Bunge, collected by Lehman in Uzbekistan, 1841-1842, National Museum of Natural History.

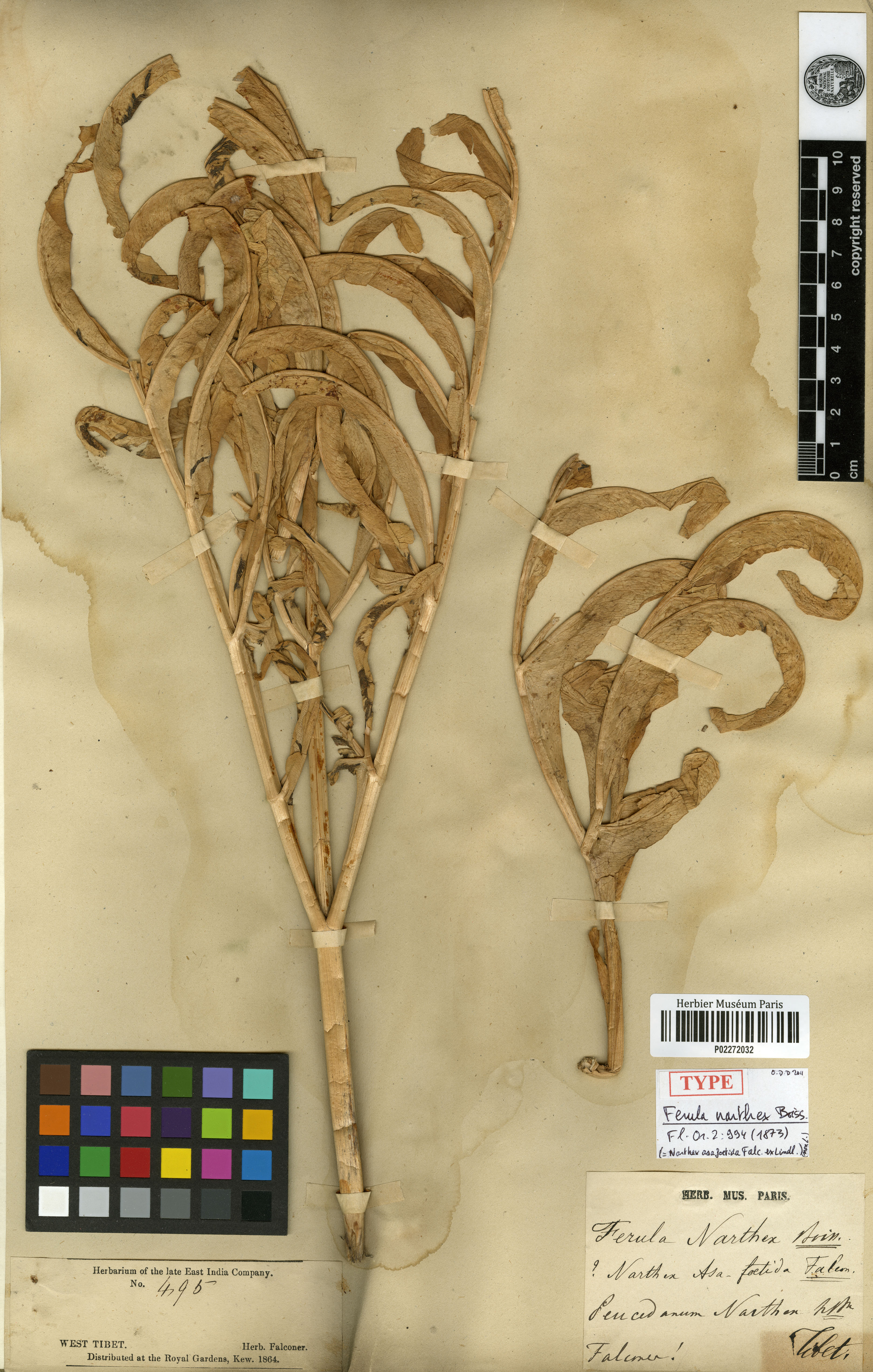

Type of Ferula narthex Boiss., collected by Falconer in Pakistan, 1838, National Museum of Natural History.

During the 19th and 20th centuries, the botanical origin of asafoetida and its relationship to silphium and other resins mentioned by ancient authors, such as galbanum and sagapenum, were the subject of sustained scholarly discussion. Both general and specialised literature has often presented divergent or inconsistent interpretations. More recent political developments in major producing regions—including the Iranian Revolution, the conflicts in Afghanistan, and the dissolution of the Soviet Union—have further limited fieldwork and delayed comprehensive floristic revisions and taxonomic reassessments.

== Botanical sources ==
Distribution ranges of the three main species producing asafoetida, after Chamberlain (1977), with modifications proposed by later authors. Locations of collection sites for type specimens: # Ferula assa-foetida # Ferula foetida # Ferula narthex # Ferula alliacea # Ferula pseudalliacea

Species of the genus Ferula are herbaceous perennials, often robust in habit and exhibiting polygamous reproductive systems. The leaves are typically compound, divided into two to four pairs of pinnae, with bases that are usually sheathing. The inflorescence is borne on a large, strongly branched peduncle and consists of numerous umbels, each bearing many flowers. The central umbel is sessile or shortly pedunculate and fertile, whereas the lateral umbels are male or polygamous. The petals are generally yellow and only rarely white. The fruit is a dorsally strongly compressed schizocarp, elliptical to oblong in shape, with conspicuously winged lateral ribs.

=== Main species ===
Ferula assa-foetida L. and Ferula foetida (Bunge) Regel are the two species most frequently cited as botanical sources of asafoetida. Their application has been affected by persistent nomenclatural and taxonomic uncertainty, and the two names have long been—and in some contexts continue to be—treated as synonyms.

F. assa-foetida is endemic to Southern Iran and is the source of asafoetida there. It has sulphur-containing compounds in the essential oil. Although it is often considered the main source of asafoetida on the international market, this notion is attributable to the fact that several Ferula species acting as the major sources are often misidentified as F. assa-foetida. In fact, the production of asafoetida from F. assa-foetida is confined to its native range, namely Southern Iran, outside which the sources of asafoetida are other species. It was described by Linnaeus on the basis of the description and engraved plate published in 1712 by Engelbert Kaempfer. Kaempfer’s observations, as well as the herbarium specimen regarded as the holotype of the species, originate from the village of Disguun in southern Iran. Although the name has historically been applied in a broader sense, most botanists now restrict the taxon to this area, where it is considered endemic. Its phylogeny and systematics remain poorly resolved, and F. assa-foetida has been proposed as a possible synonym of several later-described species, including F. erubescens Boiss., F. rubricaulis Boiss., and F. pseudalliacea Rech.f.

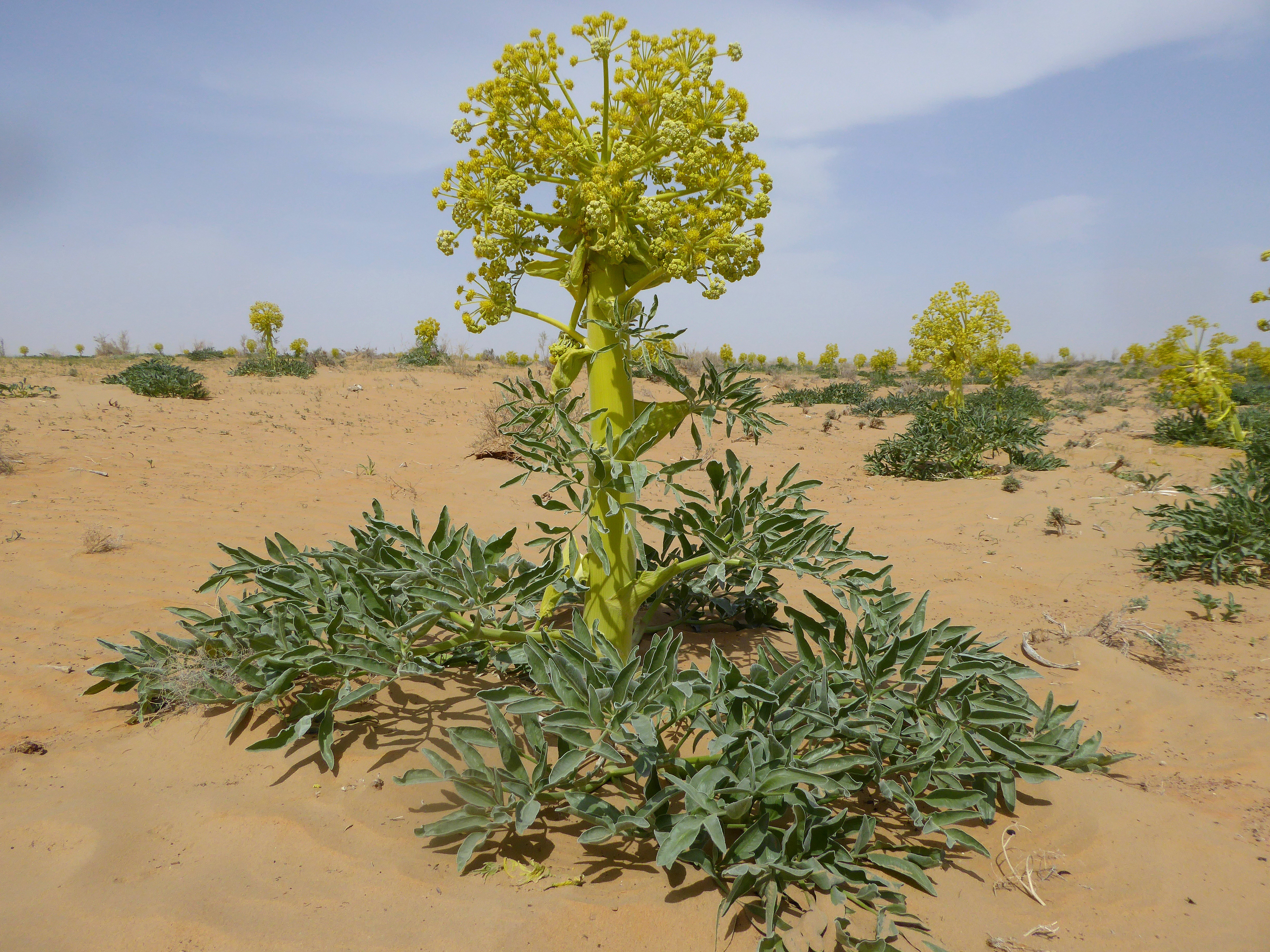
Ferula foetida in the Kyzylkum Desert, Uzbekistan.

F. foetida has a substantially wider distribution, occurring in Eastern Iran, western Afghanistan, western Pakistan and Central Asia (Karakum Desert, Kyzylkum Desert). Asafoetida derived from this species is likely the most widely traded form and the one that has been studied most extensively, although a significant portion of the literature refers to it under the name F. assa-foetida. It has sulphur-containing compounds in the essential oil, the same way as F. assa-foetida. In European pharmaceutical usage, F. foetida is generally regarded as the principal botanical source of asafoetida. From an economic perspective, it is thought to account for most of the harvests in Afghanistan, a country that continues to play a leading role in global production and export.

F. narthex has traditionally been cited in the literature as a third source of asafoetida. The species occurs naturally in northern Pakistan, as well as in eastern Afghanistan and southern Tajikistan. However, a study of Afghan production published in 1979 reported that the resin obtained from F. narthex lacked the organosulphur compounds considered characteristic of asafoetida. In India, it is nevertheless regarded by regulatory authorities as a substitute with a comparable odour.

=== Other cited sources ===
In pharmacopoeias, the three principal species are commonly cited with the addition “and other species of Ferula”, without further specification. The names applied in the literature are affected by substantial taxonomic uncertainty, and the identity, economic significance, and resin yield of these additional species remain insufficiently documented.

Among the species concerned are several taxa endemic to Iran, of which Ferula alliacea Boiss. is generally regarded as the most important. It occurs mainly in the north-eastern parts of the country and is mentioned in Iranian folk medicine as a medicinal plant. It has also been considered to have economic relevance. In the treatment of Umbelliferae in Flora Iranica, however, F. alliacea is annotated as a nomen confusum, since the published diagnoses can be referred to other species. The composition of the essential oil obtained from the roots was first investigated in 2016, revealing the presence of organosulphur compounds. Subsequent work has suggested that comparative analyses of the types and concentrations of these compounds may help clarify the botanical sources of asafoetida produced in Iran. Ferula lutensis, like Ferula alliacea, is a source of asafoetida in Eastern Iran; both species have sulphur-containing compounds in their essential oil.

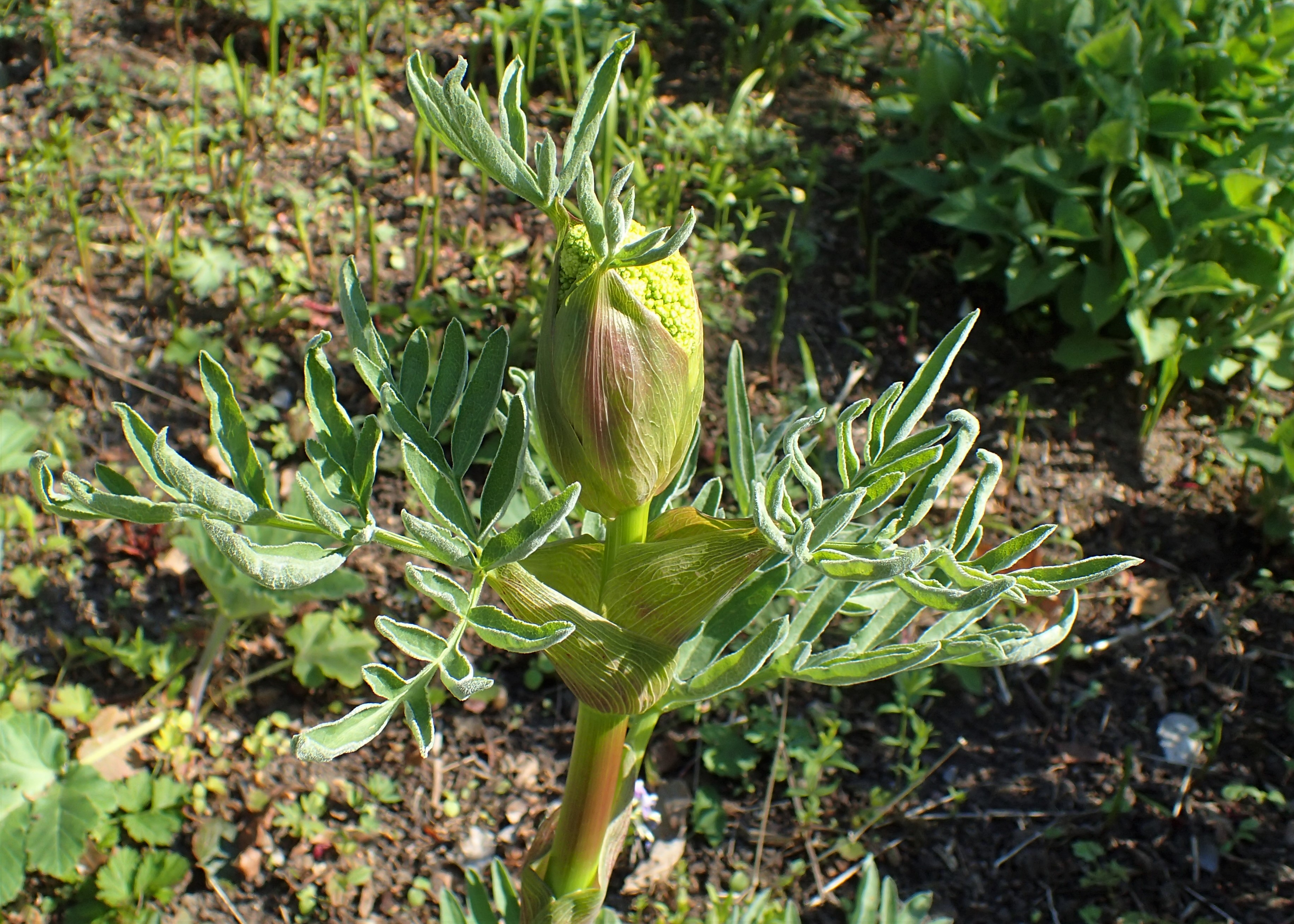
Ferula jaeschkeana at the Berlin Botanical Garden.

Other Iranian species cited as potential sources include F. rubricaulis Boiss. and F. pseudalliacea Rech.f., endemic to western and southwestern Iran and sometimes considered conspecific with F. assa-foetida; and F. gabrielii Rech.f. The first of these is also frequently mentioned as a possible source of galbanum, whereas the second has been proposed as corresponding to bitter asafoetida, which is often regarded as deriving from a variety of F. assa-foetida. The phylogeny and taxonomy of these taxa remain unresolved, as they are often based on incomplete material; for example, the leaves and stem of F. rubricaulis have not been described, and the type specimen of F. gabrielii lacks fruits.

Additional species are occasionally cited. F. rigidula Fisch. ex DC. has a more westerly distribution, occurring in Turkey (Anatolia), the Caucasus (Armenia and Azerbaijan), and western Iran (Iranian Azerbaijan). Its aerial parts are used in traditional medicine in Turkey and contain several bioactive constituents, but its status as a source of asafoetida is not supported by available evidence. F. jaeschkeana Vatke is distributed from the Caspian Sea to the Himalayas (Tibet and Bhutan). It is the only one of these species that occurs in India, which accounts for the attention it has received there, given the country’s high consumption of asafoetida. The species is found mainly around Gulmarg in Jammu and Kashmir at elevations between 2,000 and 4,000 metres (6,600 and 13,100 ft). In this region, its roots are locally used to obtain a gum resin applied to wounds and contusions. It is not considered comparable to what is generally termed “authentic” asafoetida, as its essential oil does not contain organosulphur compounds.

Furthermore, Ferula latisecta is the source of asafoetida in Eastern Iran and southern Turkmenistan, with sulphur-containing compounds in its essential oil. Lastly, Ferula sinkiangensis and Ferula fukanensis are endemic to Xinjiang, China. They are the sources of asafoetida in China and also have sulphur-containing compounds in their essential oil.

== Cultivation, extraction, and processing ==
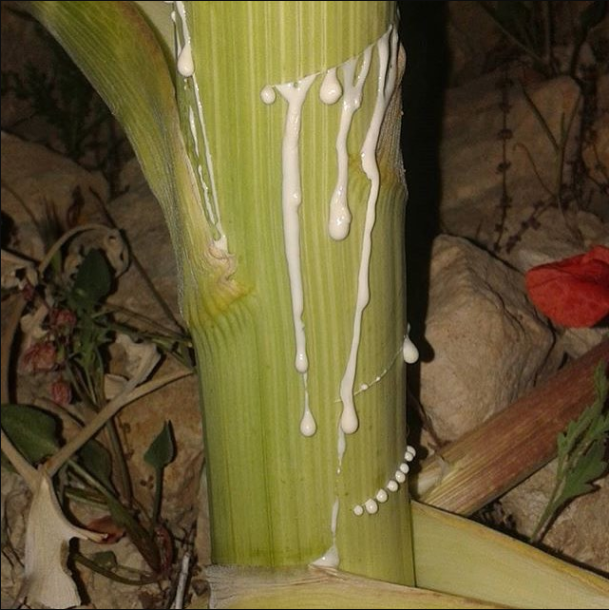
Gum resin exuding from the stem after incision.

Ferula assa-foetida is a monoecious, herbaceous, perennial plant of the family Apiaceae. It grows to 2 m (6 1/2 ft) high, with a circular mass of 30–40 cm (12–16 in) leaves. Stem leaves have wide sheathing petioles. Flowering stems are 2.5–3 m (8–10 ft) high and 10 cm (4 in) thick and hollow, with a number of schizogenous ducts in the cortex containing the resinous gum. Flowers are pale greenish yellow produced in large compound umbels. Fruits are oval, flat, thin, reddish brown and have a milky juice. Roots are thick, massive, and pulpy. They yield a resin similar to that of the stems. All parts of the plant have a distinctive smell.

Most plant exudates available on the global market are obtained from trees; by contrast, asafoetida—together with tragacanth gum—is among the relatively few products derived from incisions made in the roots of a herbaceous plant. Although gum exudes from all parts of the plant when cut, traditional production of asafoetida involves making incisions at the surface of the root crown.

Demand for the gum resin is high, while supply relies largely on harvesting from natural habitats. This harvesting pressure has reduced the biocapacity of affected ecosystems and poses a risk to the persistence of the species. For this reason, efforts to develop large-scale cultivation have been undertaken, motivated by both economic and environmental considerations. A range of cultivars is commercially available; these are generally differentiated by country of origin and perceived quality rather than by precise botanical source.

=== Cultivation parameters ===
The plant grows best under temperate and dry climatic conditions. Optimal annual precipitation is reported to range between 250 and 350 millimetres (14 in). Although the plant tolerates temperatures of up to 35 °C (95 °F), optimal temperatures are around 15 °C (59 °F) for germination and between 10 and 20 °C (50 and 68 °F) for vegetative growth, under conditions of high light availability. Cultivation is reported from elevations between 600 and 2,400 metres (7,900 ft), often on slopes steeper than 25%. The species favours fertile, well-drained soils of sandy or clayey loam type and tolerates a wide range of soil pH, from acidic to alkaline.

Propagation is most commonly achieved by seed. Vegetative reproduction through root division is possible in September but is generally discouraged because it causes substantial disturbance to the plant. Seeds are typically collected at the end of summer. Under greenhouse conditions, sowing may take place in autumn as soon as seeds reach maturity, whereas in open-field cultivation sowing is usually carried out in December–January or in April. Germination generally begins after approximately 20 days (1,700 ks). Winter sowing is associated with higher emergence rates and improved tuber yield but requires the use of protective mulch. Seeds exhibit prolonged dormancy and relatively low germination rates; these constraints may be alleviated by stratification, washing, or treatment with growth hormones. An Iranian study also reported that priming techniques improved germination and reduced the adverse effects of salinity stress.

Asafoetida cultivation in eastern Iran

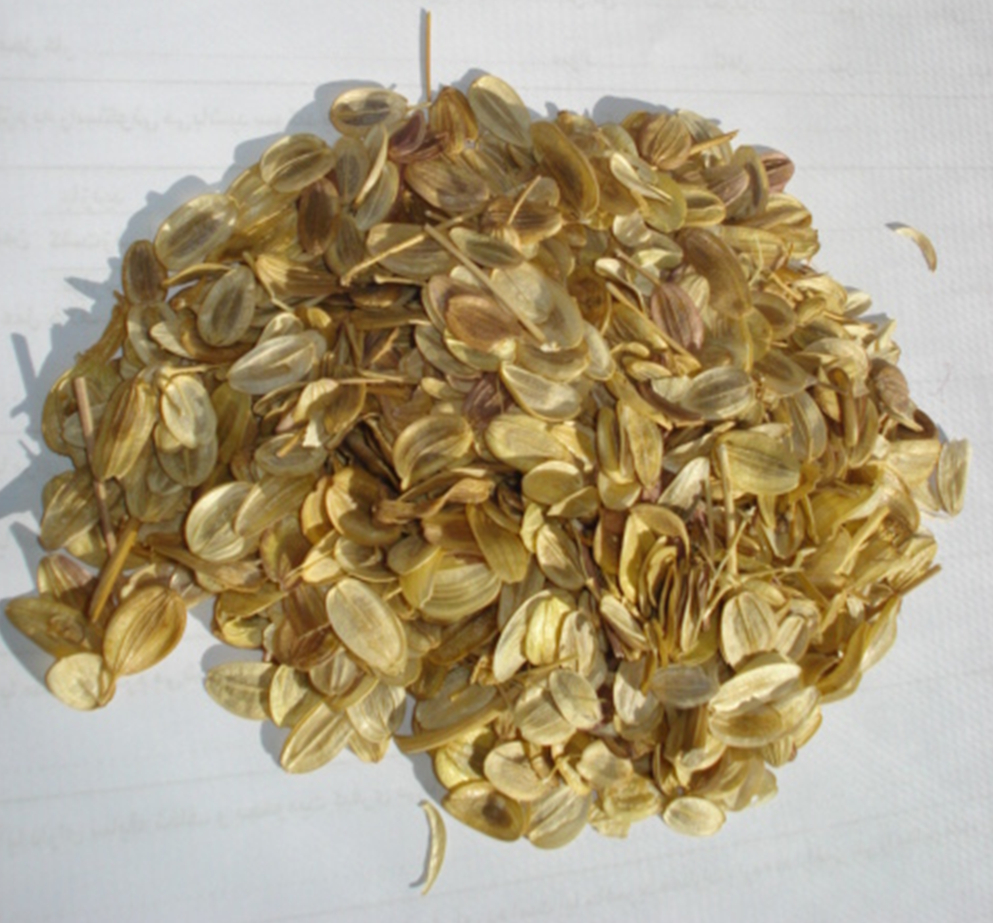
Seeds.

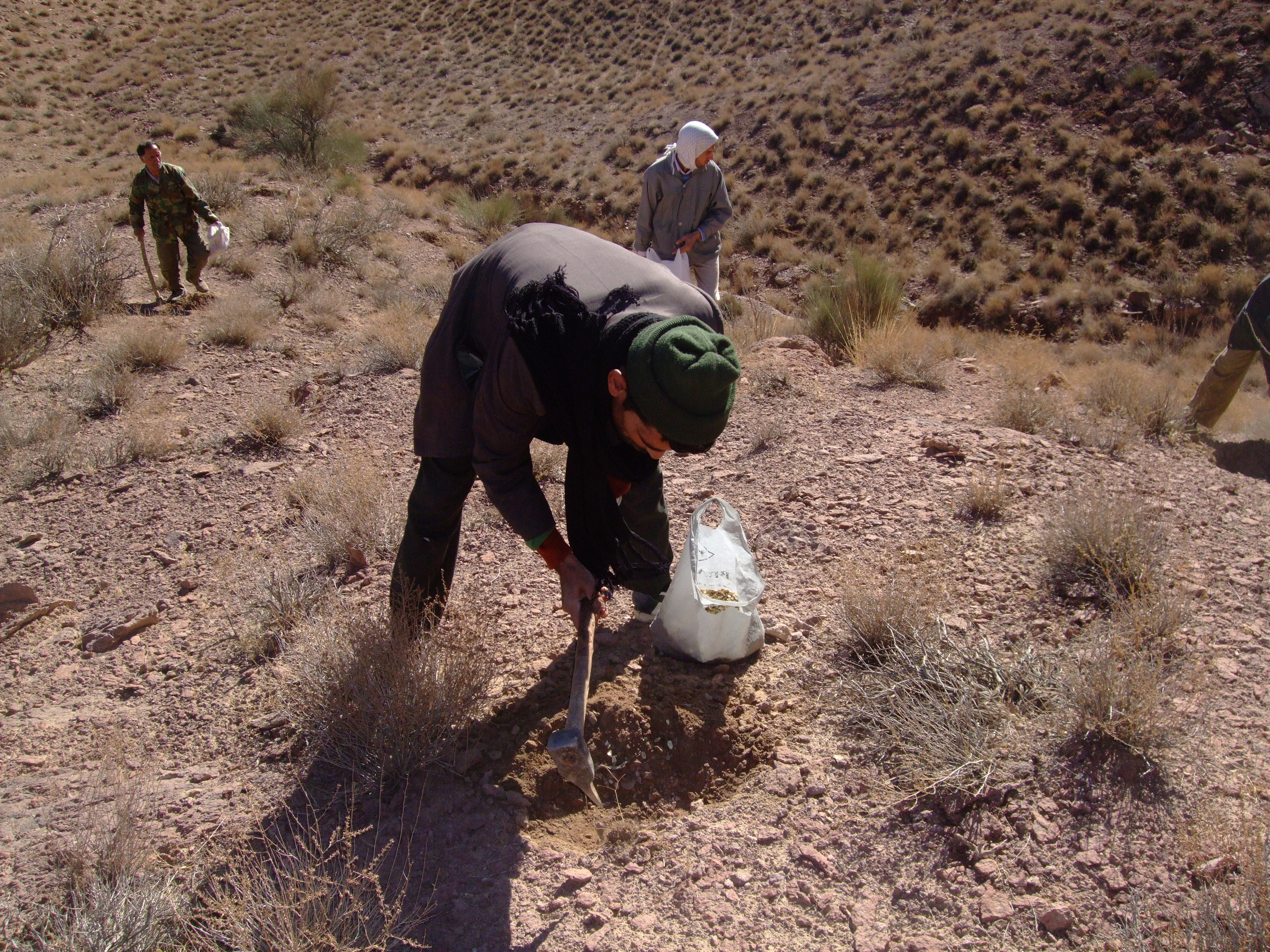
Sowing.

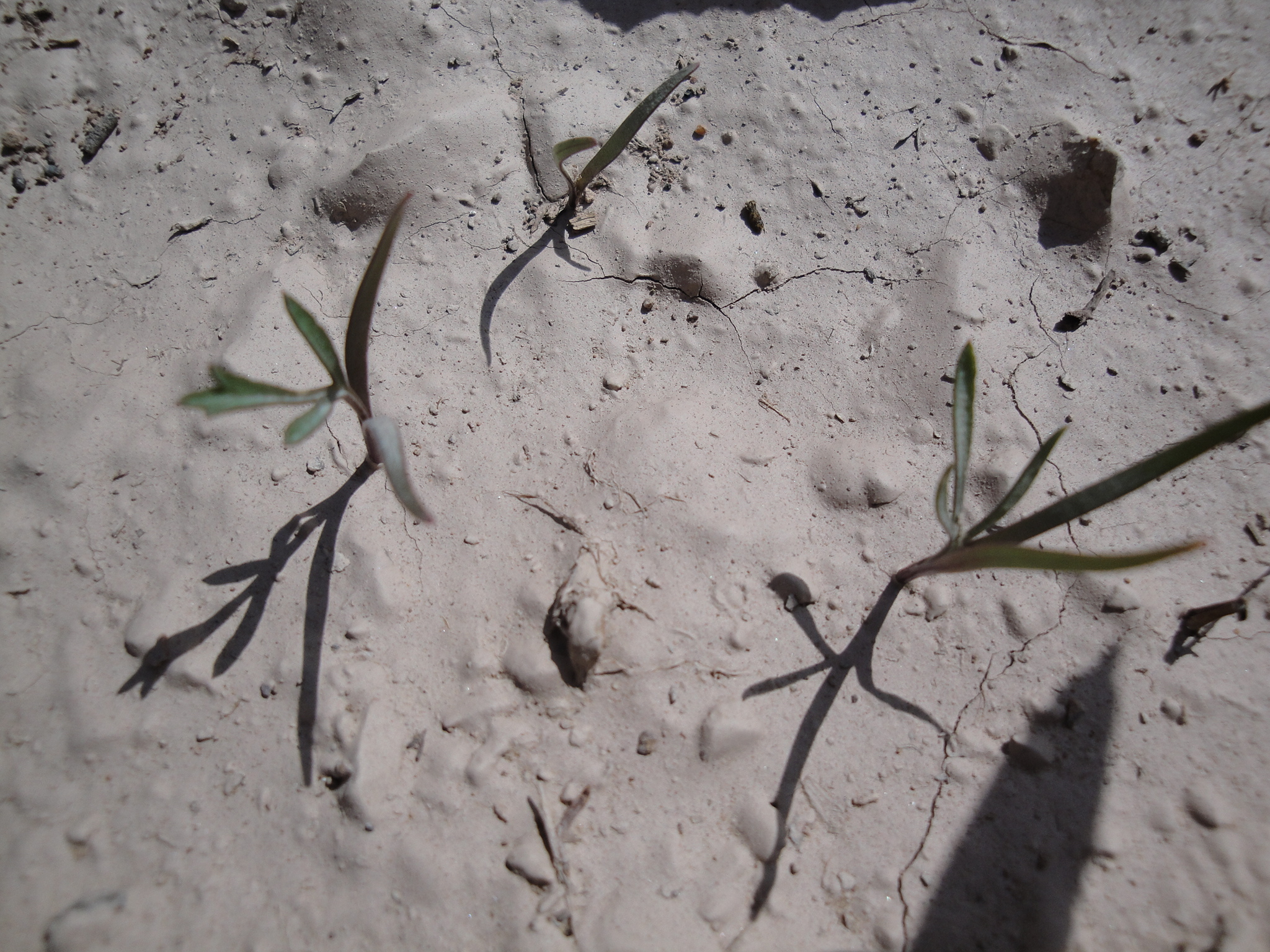
Young shoots.

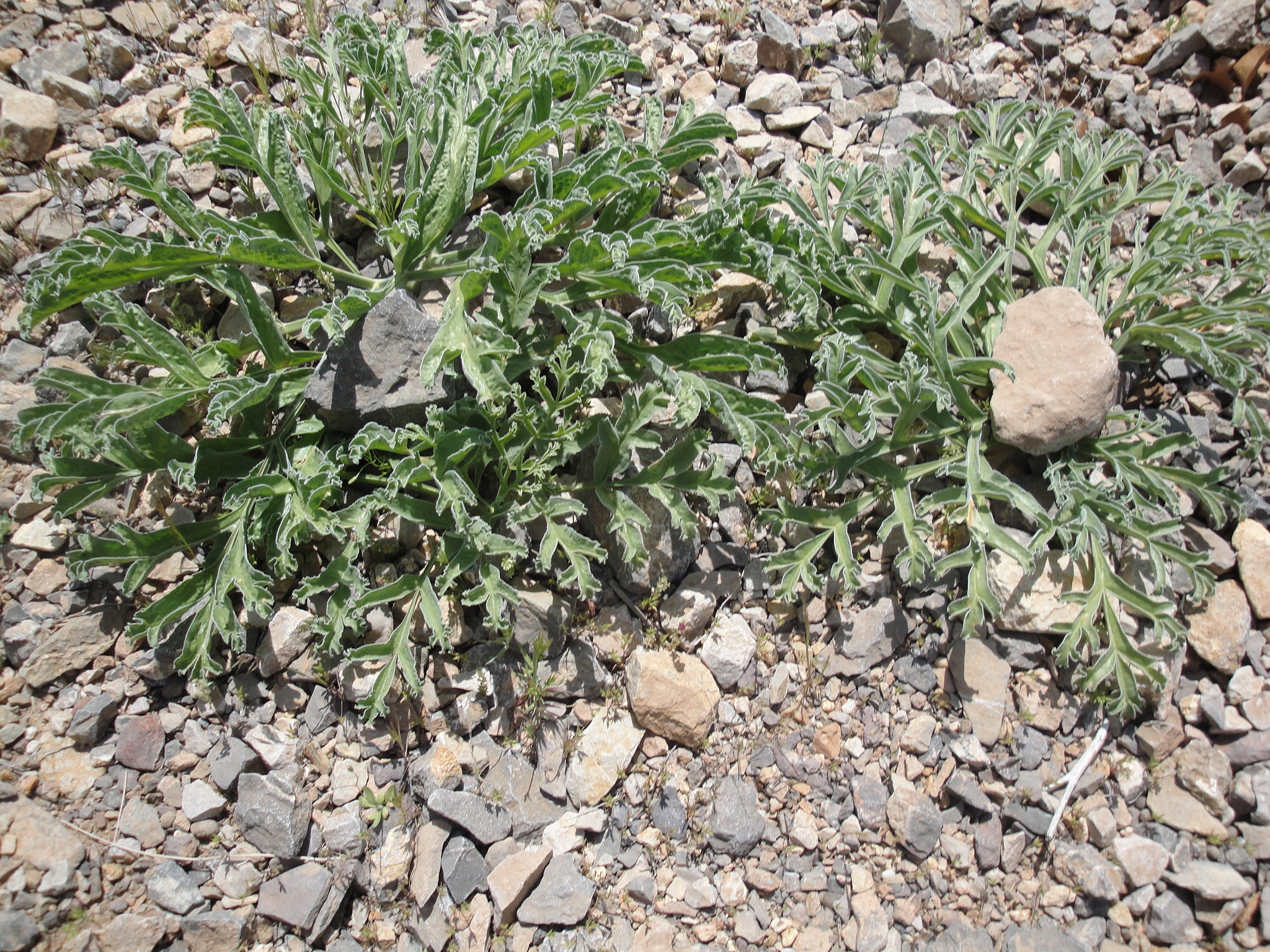
Plants 3 to 4 years (95 to 126 Ms) old.

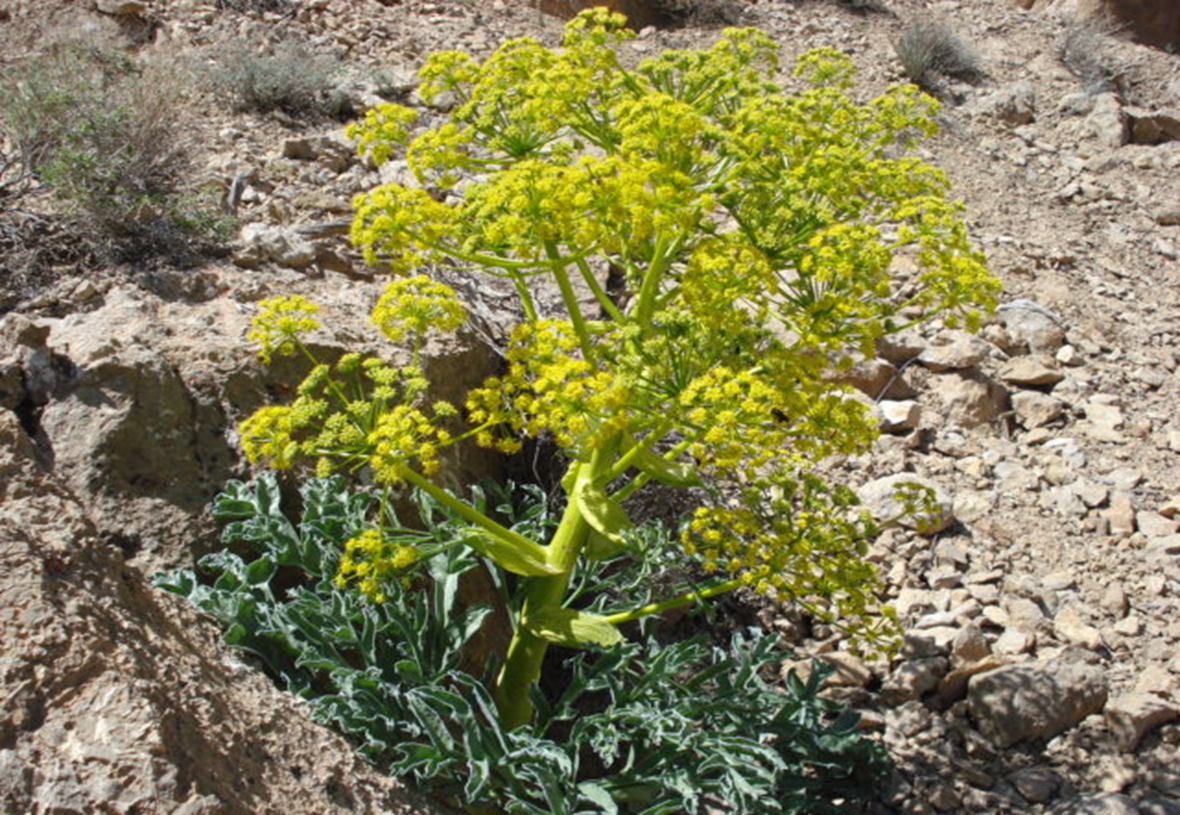
Flowering plant.

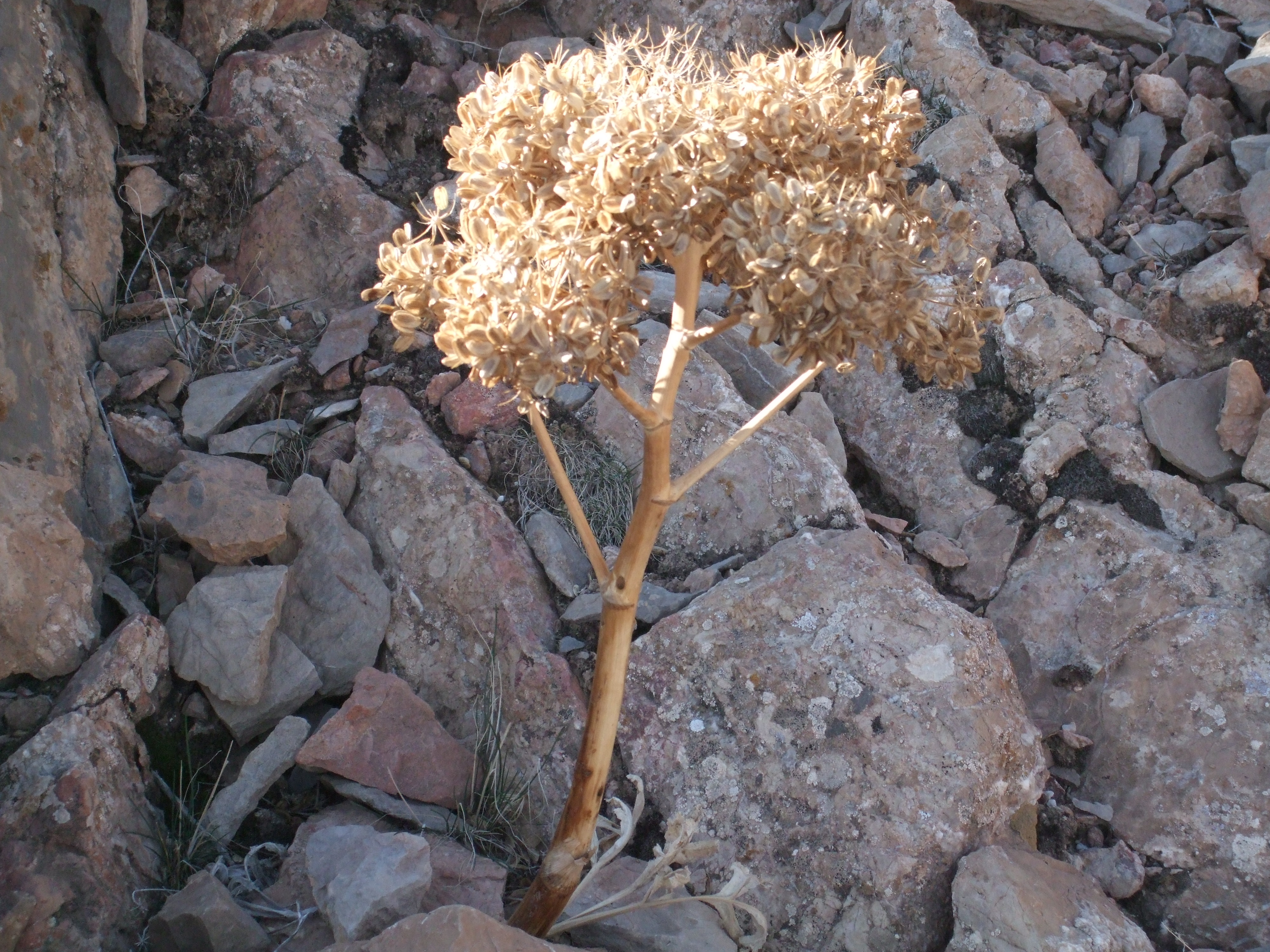
Seed-bearing plant.

During the first year of cultivation, an application of approximately 15 to 20 tonnes (15 to 20 long tons; 17 to 22 short tons) of manure per hectare is generally recommended. In subsequent years, nutrient inputs are typically supplied through fertilisers, with application rates progressively increased up to about the tenth year of growth. Commonly cited initial application rates are 20 grams (0.71 oz) of N, 18 grams (0.63 oz) of P, and 18 grams (0.63 oz) of K per plant. In soils identified as deficient in zinc, a basal application of zinc sulphate at approximately 20 kilograms (44 lb) per hectare is reported to improve yields. Two periods of weeding per year are usually required (June–July and October–November), along with digging or loosening of the soil around plants in August–September.

Water stress is considered one of the main limiting factors for growth and productivity. Moist conditions are primarily required during germination, whereas prolonged or excessive moisture at later stages may be detrimental. Weekly irrigation is generally regarded as adequate under cultivated conditions. In high-altitude cultivation areas, water requirements may be met in part or entirely by spring snowmelt.

=== Harvest ===
The specific sequence and timing of operations vary by region, but the overall harvesting technique is broadly similar throughout the plant’s range. Engelbert Kaempfer provided a detailed account of the method used in the region of Lar in southern Iran at the end of the 17th century. In the 19th century, Henry Walter Bellew, followed by James Edward Tierney Aitchison, documented comparable practices in the area around Herat in Afghanistan. Ethnobotanical surveys indicate that the preparation and harvesting methods used in rural areas of both countries remain broadly consistent with these historical descriptions.

The plant generally requires about five years to reach full development, attaining heights of up to 2 metres (6 ft 7 in). Older individuals tend to yield larger quantities of resin. Plants selected for harvesting are often identified and marked by local collectors in November of the preceding year. Collection of the latex begins when the foliage changes from green to yellow, typically in March or April, shortly before flowering. The initial step involves clearing soil and stones from around the plant and removing the foliage and stem. The upper part of the root, surmounted by a brush-like structure, is exposed, then covered with loose soil and gravel and left for approximately five days. The brush is subsequently removed, and the top of the root is scraped over an area of up to 6.5 square centimetres (1.01 sq in), after which it is covered with a dome-shaped structure made of twigs and stones.

After two or three days, a first incision is made and the exuding latex is collected. Two to three days later, a second incision, slightly deeper (about 0.5 centimetres (0.20 in)), is made to allow further exudation. This sequence of cutting and collection is repeated for ten to fifteen cycles, until latex production ceases. In an alternative method, the exudate is allowed to dry on the root and is then scraped off after several days. After each operation, the exposed surface of the root is protected to prevent contamination by soil or gravel and to maintain cool conditions conducive to resin maturation. The collected exudate is stored in a pit dug into the ground, the dimensions of which depend on the expected yield but may reach 1.8 metres (5 ft 11 in) in length and 2.4 metres (7 ft 10 in) in depth. The sides of the pit are lined with mud, and the opening is covered with plant stems, leaving an aperture of about 30 centimetres (12 in) in diameter through which the daily harvest is added. The entire harvesting period lasts approximately three months. Average yields have been estimated at around 40 grams (1.4 oz) of resin per root, although individual plants may produce up to 900 grams (32 oz).

In South Khorasan, in eastern Iran, harvesting is conducted later in the year and follows a somewhat modified procedure. Collection takes place in 12 to 16 cycles of four to five days between June and August. In this region, the base of the stem is retained, and a thin slice is removed at each stage. These slices, known in Persian as keshteh, are collected together with the exuded resin and allowed to dry. The dried material is then sold to processing facilities, where the crude gum-resin is extracted. An experienced harvester may process up to 1,000 plants per cycle and obtain between 2 and 3 kilograms (4.4 and 6.6 lb) of raw product in favourable years.

Asafoetida harvesting in the village of Sorond near Tabas, South Khorasan

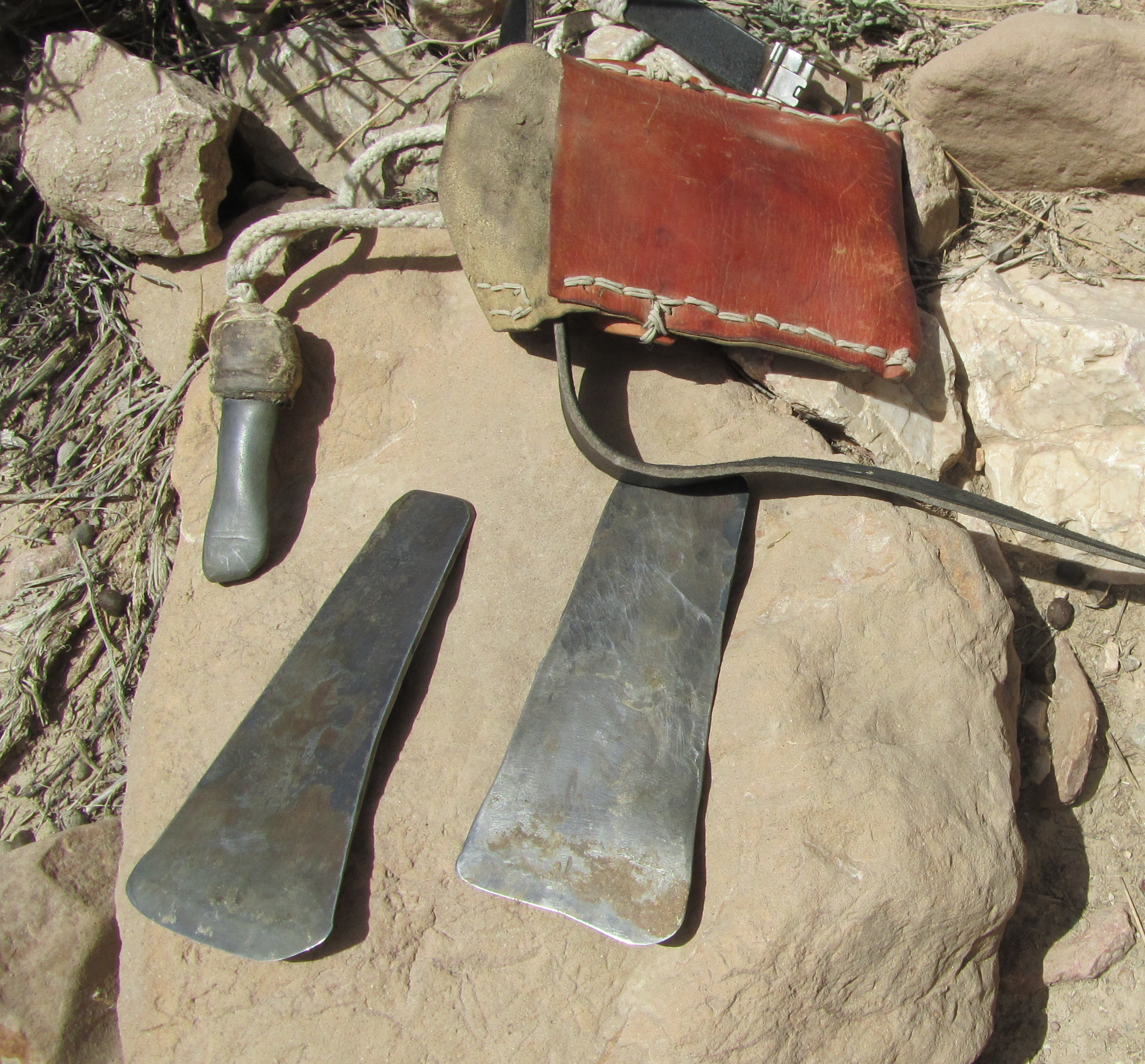
Traditional tools.

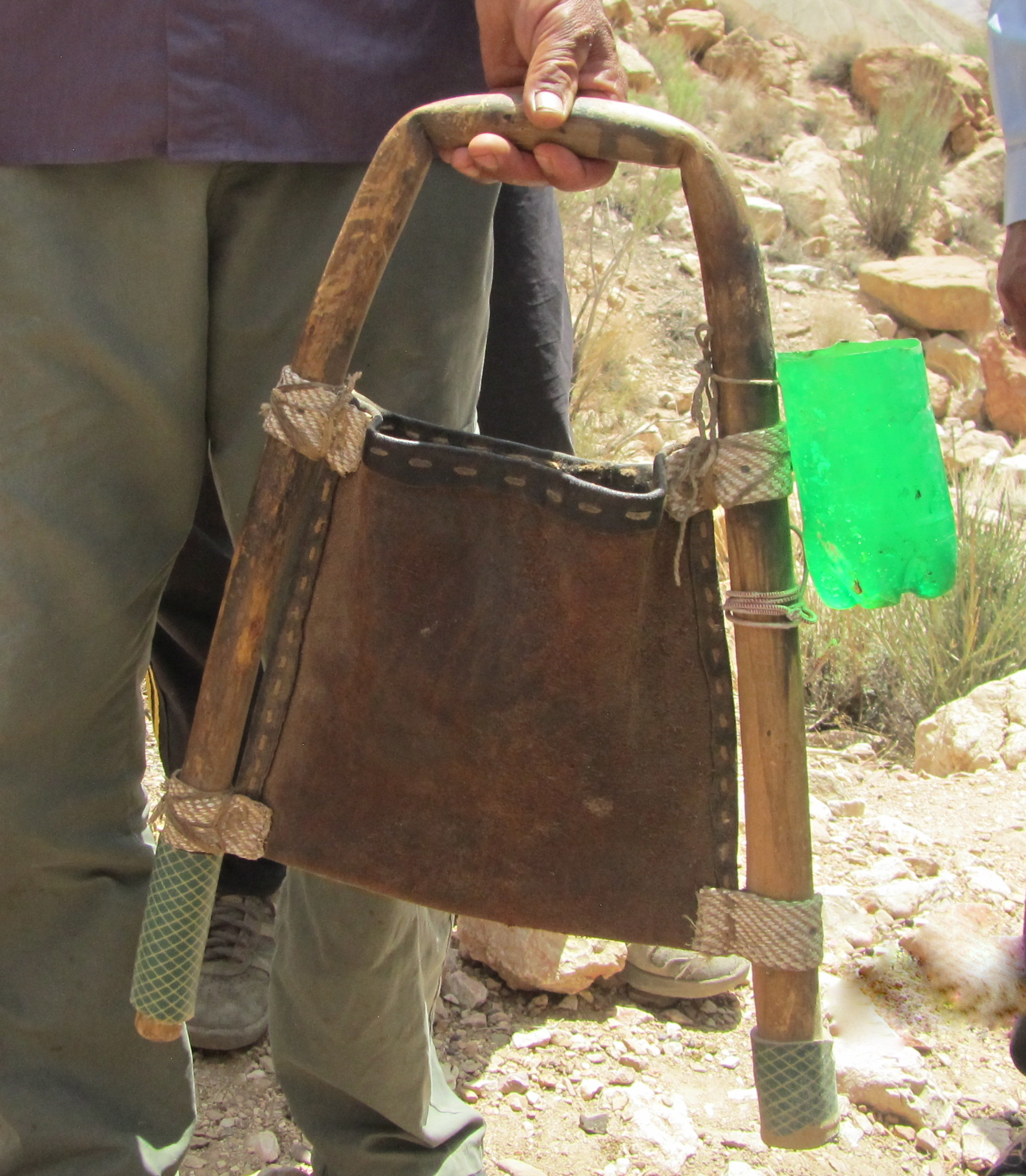
Traditional equipment.

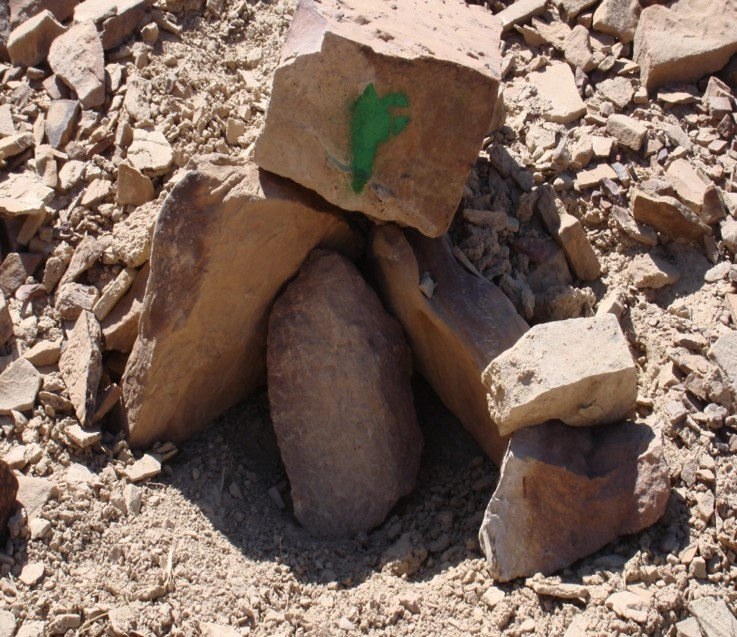
Protective dome over a plant being exploited.

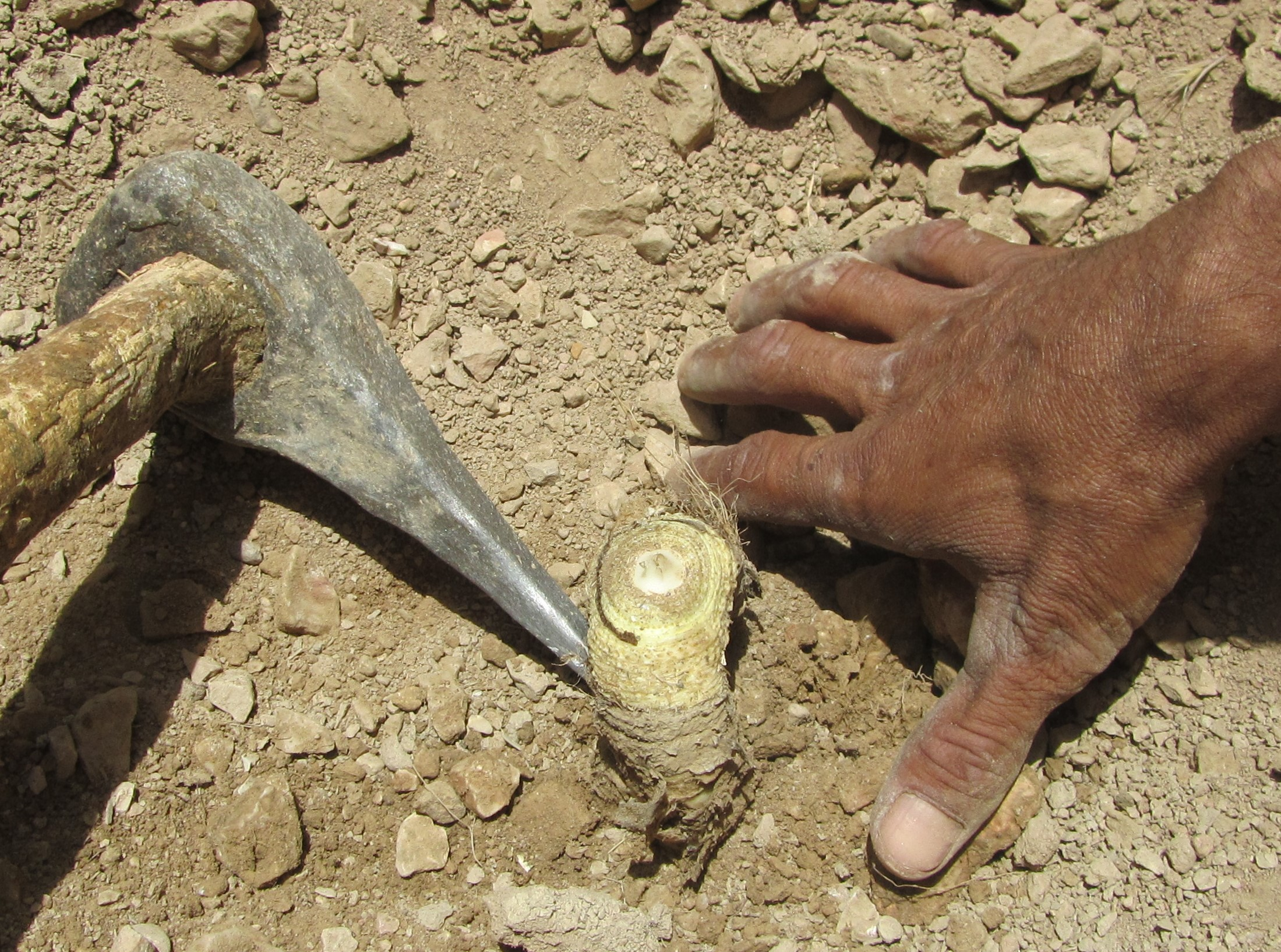
Root crown exuding gum-resin.

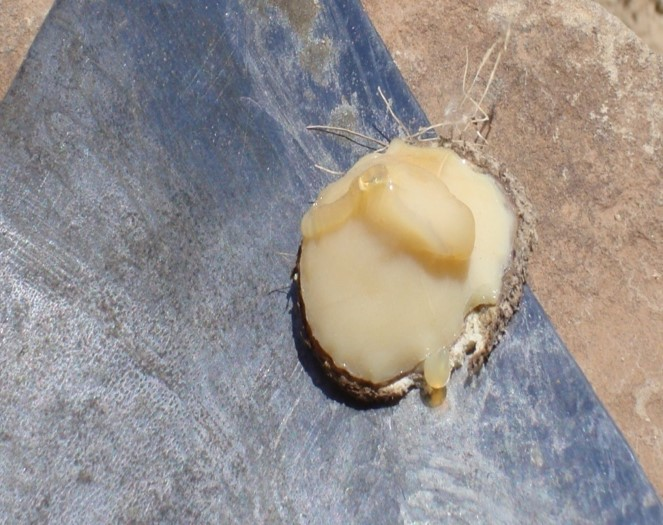
Stem slice with exudate.

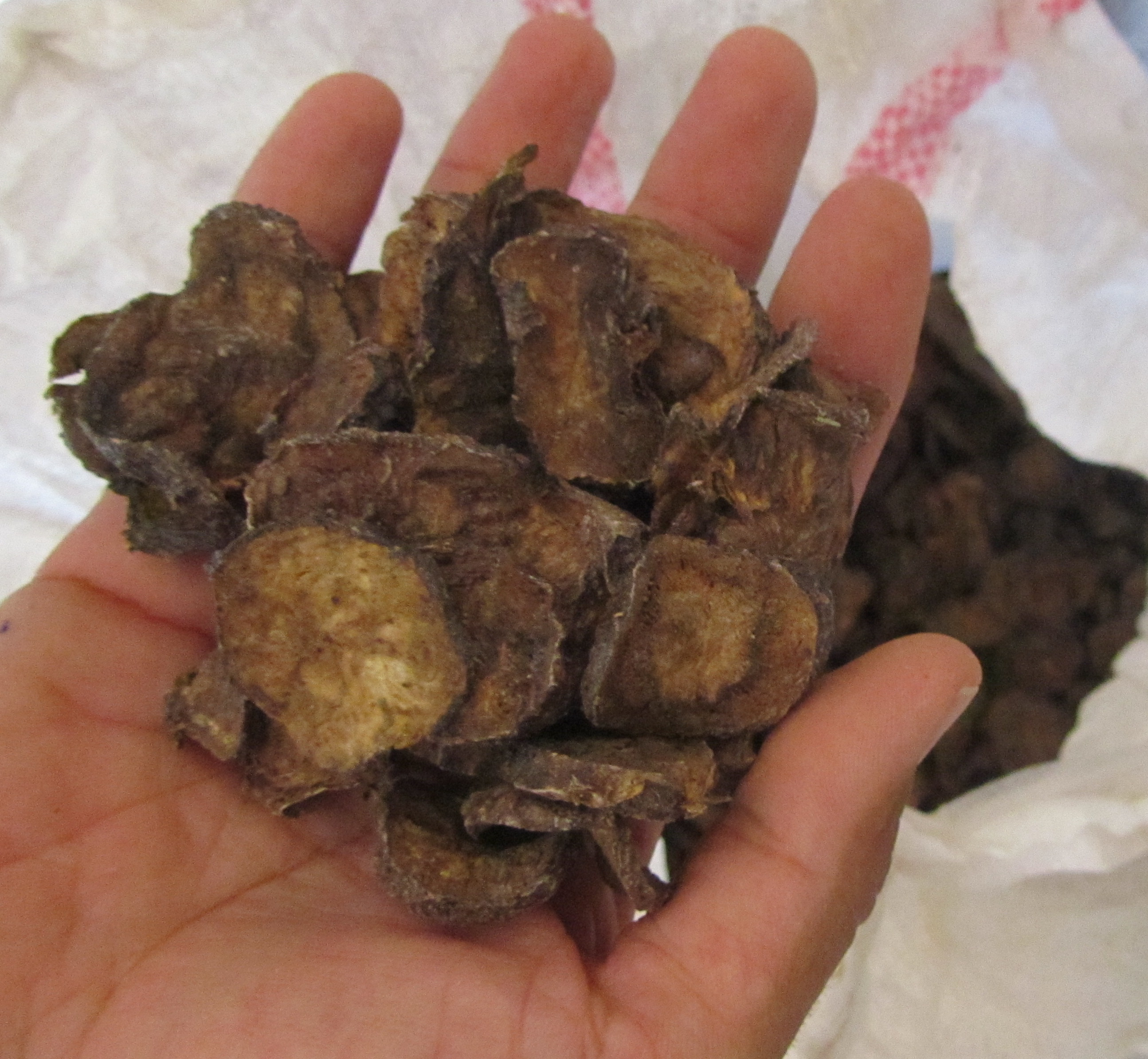
Dried stem slices sold on the market.

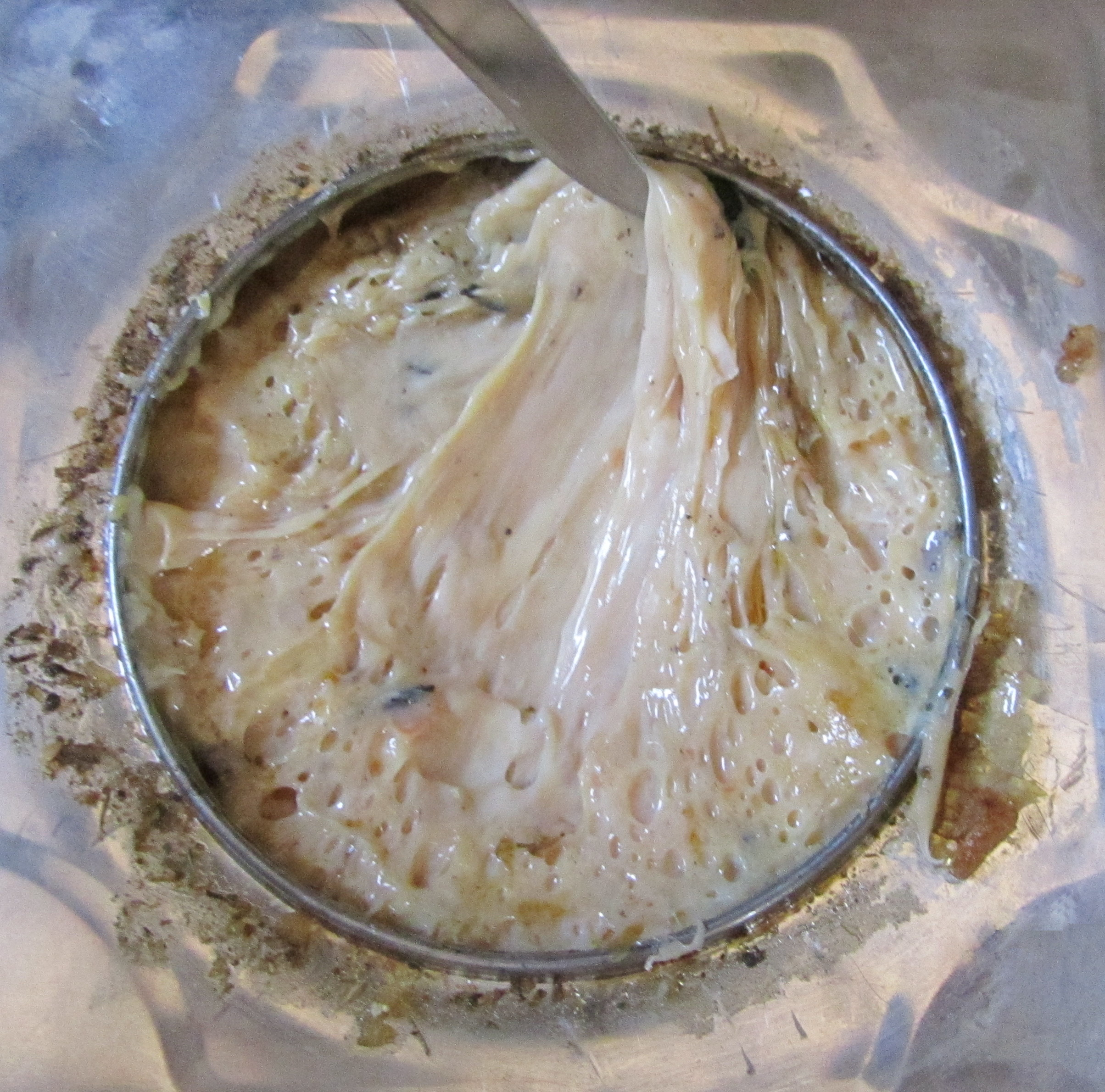
Melted gum-resin obtained from the slices.

The resin may also be obtained through a series of incisions made at the junction between the rhizome stem and the taproot. In parts of Afghanistan, some Pashtuns collect resin by cutting the stems of wild plants and boiling them together with the roots to evaporate the water. Resin produced using this method is generally regarded as being of lower quality than that obtained through standard tapping techniques.

=== Processing and derived products ===
The resin stored in pits is typically thick and sticky. It is characterised by a strong odour and a bitter, acrid taste, and its colour ranges from white to grey or dark red. During storage, the material continues to mature and can subsequently be hand-moulded and processed into forms commonly referred to as “tears”, “mass”, or “paste”. White asafoetida was traditionally wrapped in cloth and then placed in jute sacks, whereas the dark red variety was packed in goat or sheep skin, a method associated with more pronounced maturation. In contemporary practice, packaging is generally carried out using plastic bags or sheets, which are then placed in wooden boxes.

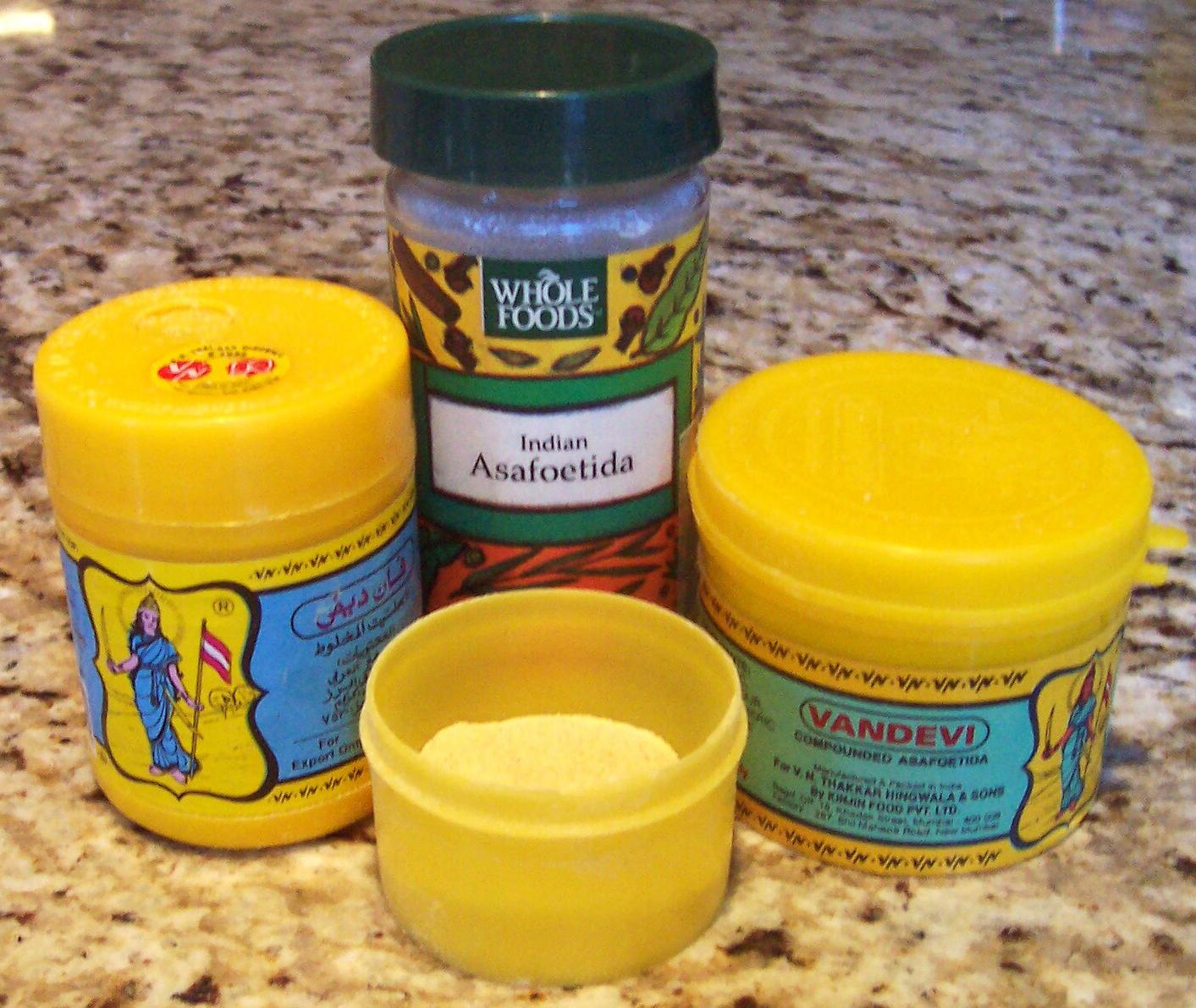
Different presentations of compounded asafoetida, also known in India as "yellow powder".

The principal derived products of asafoetida are the essential oil, the tincture, and the compounded powder. The essential oil is obtained by steam distillation. It is stored in airtight containers and kept in a cool environment (15 to −25 °C (59 to −13 °F)). Because of its high concentration, handling practices generally recommend avoiding contact with the eyes or skin and limiting inhalation of vapours. The essential oil is used primarily in medicinal preparations. The tincture is produced by extracting the resin with ethanol and may vary in concentration according to its application. A commonly cited preparation involves macerating 200 grams (7.1 oz) of asafoetida in 750 millilitres (26 imp fl oz; 25 US fl oz) of 70 per cent alcohol for one week, followed by filtration and dilution to volume. When water is added, the tincture becomes milky as a result of emulsification of the essential oil (the Ouzo effect). Tinctures are used mainly in the pharmaceutical industry, the food flavouring industry, and perfumery.

The compounded form of asafoetida, known in India as Bandhani Hing, is produced by diluting resin from one or more sources with substances such as gum arabic, rice flour or wheat flour, and turmeric. This adulteration reduces odour intensity, limits clumping, and imparts colour to the preparation. Compounding allows direct use in cooking without prior dilution, as the pure resin is highly concentrated and difficult to grate. Formulations vary among manufacturers and are generally treated as trade secrets, but the final product typically contains about 30% asafoetida.

Bandhani Hing is especially popular in southern India and is marketed in powdered form or as bricks of compacted powder.

== Composition and phytochemistry ==
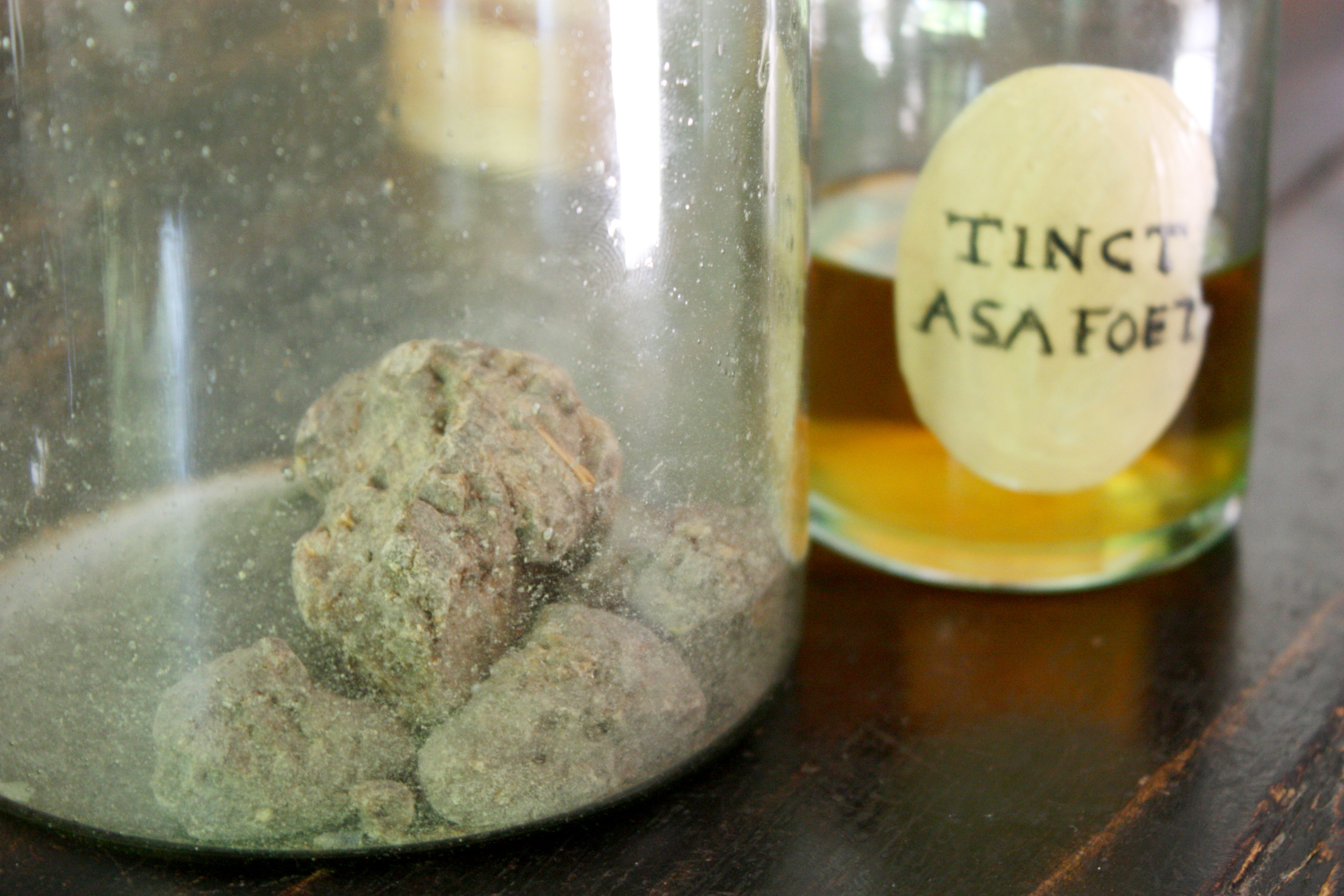
Asafoetida in pieces and as a tincture.

Asafoetida is an oleo-gum-resin (or gum oleoresin), consisting of three main groups of constituents: resinous compounds (approximately 40–64%), endogeneous gum (about 25%), and a volatile fraction in the form of essential oil (10–17%).

The total ash content typically ranges from 1.5 to 10%. The resin fraction contains up to 60% ferulic acid and its esters, along with coumarins and various terpenoids, asaresinotannols A and B, umbelliferone, and four unidentified compounds. The gum fraction is composed of simple sugars (glucose, galactose, L-arabinose, rhamnose, and glucuronic acid), as well as polysaccharides and glycoproteins. The volatile oil component is rich in various organosulfide compounds, such as 2-butyl-propenyl-disulphide, diallyl sulphide, diallyl disulphide (also present in garlic) and dimethyl trisulfide, which is also responsible for the odour of cooked onions. The organosulfides are primarily responsible for the odour and flavour of asafoetida.

=== Ferulic acid ===
Ferulic acid is a phenolic derivative of cinnamic acid that is widespread and abundant in the plant cell wall. It was first isolated in 1866 by the Austrian chemists Heinrich Hlasiwetz and Ludwig Barth zu Barthenau from asafoetida and was named after its botanical source (Ferula sp.). Ferulic acid has been reported in the literature to exhibit a range of biological activities, including antioxidant, antiallergic, hepatoprotective, anti-cancer, anti-inflammatory, antimicrobial, antiviral, vasodilator, and antithrombotic effects. It has also been studied for its effects on sperm viability and for its involvement in chelation, modulation of enzymatic activity, activation of transcription factors, gene expression, and signal transduction. In asafoetida, ferulic acid occurs either in free form or as an ester of asaresinotannol. The free acid is converted into umbelliferone during dry distillation.

=== Sesquiterpene coumarins ===
Umbelliprenin consists of a coumarin (umbelliferone, in blue) linked via its hydroxyl group to a sesquiterpene (farnesol, in red).

Sesquiterpene coumarins are naturally occurring compounds with documented pharmacological activity, produced by certain plant species in the families Asteraceae (genus Artemisia), Rutaceae (genus Haplophyllum), and Apiaceae (genera Angelica, Heptaptera, Heracleum, Peucedanum, and Ferula, which is particularly rich in these constituents). Structurally, they consist of a sesquiterpene (terpene with 15 carbon atoms) linked by an ether bond to a coumarin derivative. In the case of asafoetida, the coumarin moiety is predominantly umbelliferone (7-hydroxycoumarin).

Structure of farnesiferol A: umbelliferone (in blue) linked to a cyclic sesquiterpene (in red).

The simplest compound in this group is umbelliprenin, which was first isolated in 1938 from the seeds of Angelica archangelica. Its biological properties were investigated in detail only in the 21st century, when studies reported anti-inflammatory, antioxidant, and antileishmanial activities. Several derivatives of umbelliprenin have also been identified in asafoetida, including 5-hydroxyumbelliprenin, 8-hydroxyumbelliprenin, 9-hydroxyumbelliprenin, asacoumarin (5,8-hydroxyumbelliprenin), 5-acetoxy-8-hydroxyumbelliprenin, 8-acetoxy-5-hydroxyumbelliprenin (reported to exhibit anti-inflammatory and antiviral activity), 10-R-karatavicinol, 6,7-dihydroxykaratavicinol, and 10-R-acetoxy-11-hydroxyumbelliprenin.

The resin also contains other cyclic compounds that have been investigated for potential therapeutic effects. Farnesiferols A, B, C, and D have been reported to show antiviral, anti-tumour, and anti-angiogenic activity. Conferol has been studied for antiviral and cytotoxic effects, as well as for synergistic interactions with anti-cancer agents such as vincristine. Galbanic acid has been reported, among other properties, to influence antibiotic resistance in Staphylococcus aureus. Additional cyclic derivatives of sesquiterpene coumarins—including gummosin, assafoetidnol A and B, polyanthine, badrakemin, samarcandin, feselol, microlobidene, and kellerin—have been identified in asafoetida and other Ferula species, and several of these compounds continue to be the subject of pharmacological research.

=== Organosulfur compounds ===
Three of the main disulfides of asafoetida (from top to bottom): disulfide of 2-butyl and 1-propenyl; disulfide of 1-(methylthio)propyl and 1-propenyl; disulfide of 2-butyl and 3-(methylthio)-2-propenyl.

Volatile Organosulfur compounds are Secondary metabolites produced by plants and Microorganisms and are often characterised by strong odours. These odours arise from various sulphur-containing molecules, including Hydrogen sulfide (commonly described as having a rotten egg odour), Sulfur dioxide (sharp and irritating), and a range of Thiols. In plants, such compounds are found primarily in the families Brassicaceae, Apiaceae, Liliaceae, Caricaceae, Capparaceae, Solanaceae, and Rutaceae. From a pharmacological perspective, organosulfur compounds have been reported to exhibit Anti-inflammatory, immunomodulatory, antihypertensive, Antioxidant, and hypocholesterolaemic activities. They are also used as indicators of quality and authenticity in commercial plant materials and derived products.

The attribution of the characteristic odour and taste of asafoetida to sulphur-containing compounds, by analogy with garlic or onion, has been proposed since the late 19th century. In 1891, the German chemist Friedrich Wilhelm Semmler demonstrated the presence of a Disulfide in the essential oil of the resin, although its precise structure could not be determined at that time. The disulfide of 2-butyl and 1-propenyl was subsequently identified in 1936 as the principal component of the volatile fraction. The concentration of this compound and the relative proportions of its Z and E Diastereomers vary considerably depending on the species and the timing of harvest.

The essential oil of asafoetida contains more than 80 compounds, including at least approximately thirty additional organosulphur compounds. Several of these molecules activate the TRPA1 channel, a member of the Ion channel family of transient receptor potential (TRP) channels, in a manner comparable to mustard essential oil or the sulphur compounds present in onion and garlic. This receptor is strongly expressed in the Oral cavity and the Respiratory tract. Its activation has been implicated in the pungency of asafoetida and, through desensitisation mechanisms, may contribute to the symptomatic relief of respiratory conditions traditionally associated with the spice.

Beyond their contribution to the sensory and medicinal properties of the resin, organosulphur compounds may serve as chemotaxonomic markers for determining its botanical origin. A 2020 study applied this approach by establishing sulphur compound profiles of asafoetida-producing species in Iran using Gas chromatography coupled with Mass spectrometry. Analysis of commercially available resin samples allowed correlations to be drawn with specific taxa and their geographic origin. The results indicated higher absolute concentrations of organosulphur compounds in eastern species such as F. foetida and F. alliacea, whereas samples of F. assa-foetida collected in southern Iran showed a higher relative content of Monoterpene compounds, notably α-pinene and β-pinene.

== Effects and toxicity ==
=== Functional properties ===
In the 1990s, pharmacopoeias noted that the medicinal use of asafoetida was not supported by clinical evidence. During the first two decades of the 21st century, however, a substantial body of pharmacological research, mainly conducted in Iran, examined the properties of the oleo-gum-resin. These studies, primarily based on laboratory and preclinical models, have reported a range of biological activities that suggest pharmacological potential. The specific active phytochemical constituents have not yet been fully identified, and further investigation is required to establish their safety and clinical relevance.

Main functions of asafoetida reported in the literature
System	Function	Identified active principles	Study type	Product origin	References
Endocrine system	Anti-obesity, antidiabetic, antihyperlipidemic	Ferulic acid, Umbelliferone, Quercetin	In vivo, rats	Commercial resin	Abu-Zaiton (2010)
Endocrine system	Anti-obesity, antidiabetic, antihyperlipidemic	Ferulic acid, Umbelliferone, Quercetin	In vivo, rats	Commercial resin	Azizian et al. (2012)
Endocrine system	Anti-obesity, antidiabetic, antihyperlipidemic	Ferulic acid, Umbelliferone, Quercetin	In vivo, rats	F. assa-foetida (Bastak, Iran)	Latifi et al. (2019)
Digestive system	Antidiarrheal	–	in vivo, rats	F. assa-foetida	Jalilzadeh-Amin et al. (2017)
Digestive system	Antispasmodic	–	In vitro, ileum of Guinea pig	F. assa-foetida (Gonabad, Iran)	Fatehi et al. (2004)

=== Toxicity ===
In adults, the ingestion of asafoetida is generally considered to be associated with low or negligible toxicity. A study involving ten volunteers reported no adverse effects following the ingestion of 3 grams (0.11 oz) of oleo-gum-resin consumed on buttered bread, and doses of up to 15 grams (0.53 oz) have also been described as tolerated. Adverse effects have nevertheless been reported after the ingestion of higher amounts, including occasional lip swelling and indigestion, with fetid belching, flatulence, and diarrhoea. Headaches, dizziness, and increased libido have also been described.

In individuals described as nervous or sensitive, doses of approximately 0.05 to 0.1 grams (0.0035 oz) have been reported to induce convulsions. The external application of resin-based poultices to the abdomen has been associated with inflammation and swelling of the genital organs. A case of methaemoglobinaemia has been documented in a five-week-old infant following the ingestion of glycerinated asafoetida administered as a folk remedy for colic. The infant was hospitalised approximately six hours after ingestion, presenting with tachypnoea and cyanosis.

The genotoxicity of asafoetida has been investigated in the laboratory mouse. Oral administration was reported to have a weak inducing effect on sister chromatid exchanges in spermatogonia. In a separate study, the resin was found to induce chromosomal abnormalities in spermatocytes, an effect attributed to umbelliferone. By contrast, no mutagenic effects were observed in Drosophila. Because of its reported abortifacient properties, the use of asafoetida is generally discouraged during pregnancy.

== Uses ==
=== Spice ===
When the resin is sold in solid chunks, it is typically first broken up and ground in a mortar and pestle with an absorbent material such as rice flour. The resulting powder is then fried in oil or soaked in water, a process that produces an aroma reminiscent of onion or garlic. The use of compounded asafoetida reduces the risk of excessive dosing, as only very small amounts are required: approximately one sixteenth of a teaspoon is sufficient to season a dish for one person. In powdered form, the spice retains its aroma for several years, while the pure resin can preserve its aromatic properties for decades. The odour of the pure resin is so strong that the pungent smell will contaminate other spices stored nearby if it is not stored in an airtight container.

Whether silphium truly disappeared in the 1st century or became prohibitively expensive, it appears to have been interchangeable with asafoetida in ancient Roman cuisine. Both substances were used to flavour a wide variety of dishes, and their culinary role has been compared to that of the onion in modern European cooking. According to the recipe collection The Art of Cooking by Apicius, compiled at the end of the 4th century, laser "from Cyrenaica or from the Parthians" was dissolved either alone in garum (fish sauce) and vinegar, or combined with pepper, parsley, mint, and honey. It was also recommended to store it in a jar with pine nuts, using the nuts gradually while replacing them with fresh ones to conserve the costly spice. In the Near East during the Talmudic period, asafoetida was commonly used both as a seasoning and as a remedy. Typical preparations involved dissolving it in cold or hot water, or in vinegar.

Asafoetida and garum appear to have fallen out of common culinary use in the early Middle Ages, possibly replaced by new ingredients such as almond milk or by evolving combinations of spices and herbs. Border conflicts between Rome and the Sasanian Persia may also have restricted resin imports or significantly increased their cost. Asafoetida later reappeared in European pharmacopoeias under the influence of Arabic medicine, but it appears to have been less commonly used as a culinary ingredient. Nevertheless, recipes incorporating the resin are found in the Kitāb al-ṭabīẖ, a 13th-century collection from Muslim Iberia, as well as in the dietary guidance of Maimonides in the Mishneh Torah, indicating its continued presence in medieval Mediterranean cuisines. In the modern period, however, most culinary traditions involving asafoetida are associated with Asian cuisines.

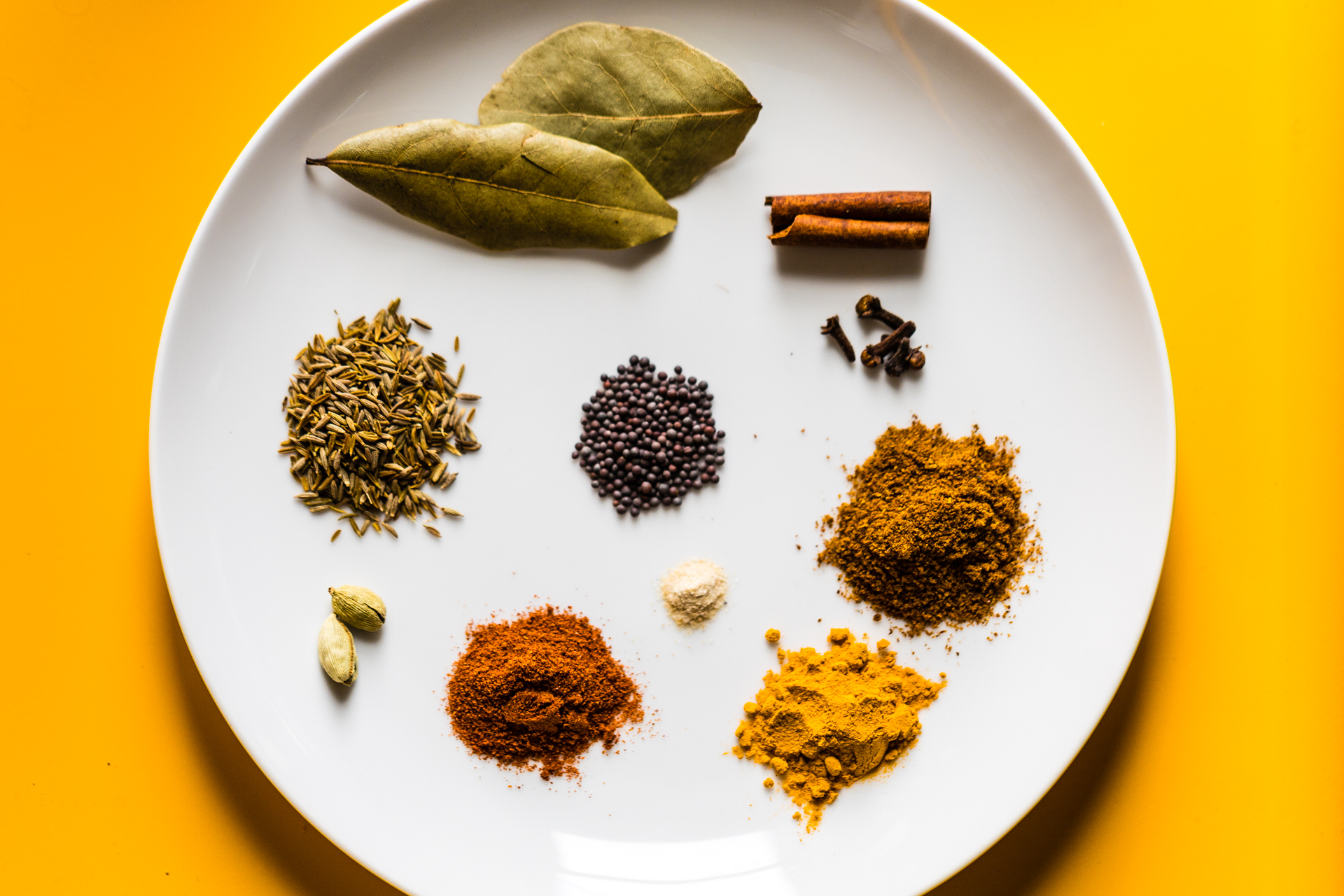
Asafoetida (below the centre, a very small pile of white powder), among other spices for preparing an Indian curry.

In Indian cuisine, asafoetida is widely used to flavour curries, soups, sauces, and pickles, most often in combination with other allium-like aromatics. In southern regions of the subcontinent, it is commonly used in vegetarian dishes such as sambar, rasam, and certain lentil-based curries. It is also sometimes added to fish dishes and is used in the preparation of papadums, flatbreads made from urad bean flour. Asafoetida is also a component of traditional spice mixes such as chaat masala. In addition, it is an essential seasoning in chivda, a category of snack mixes originating in Bombay. The resin continues to be used as a substitute for garlic or onion by certain communities that avoid these foods, including Jains, who refrain from eating roots, and some Brahmins, who traditionally regard garlic as a prohibited aphrodisiac. Asafoetida is quickly heated in hot oil before it is sprinkled on the food, a practice known as tempering. It is sometimes used to harmonise sweet, sour, salty, and spicy components in food.

In Afghanistan and Pakistan, Pashtun communities traditionally use asafoetida in the preparation of lahndi. Fresh meat is rubbed with a mixture of resin and salt, threaded onto tall racks, and left to air-dry. This dried meat is then consumed during the winter months.

Among the peoples of the former Soviet Union, the Turkmen are reported to be the primary consumers of asafoetida, where it is known as чомуч [tchomutch]. The Yomut tribe prepares a specific condiment from it called алажа [alaja]. Young plant parts and roots are also used to produce a sweet preparation known as тошоп [tochop]. These are boiled for several hours until the liquid thickens into a dense, dark brown to black mass resembling molasses. The mixture is strained to remove fibrous residues, which are used as animal feed. The tochop is then seasoned with butter or melted sheep fat and eaten with bread. Asafoetida was also used by Kazakhs in Xinjiang (China), as well as by Dungans and Uyghurs living in Kazakhstan. Because of its strong odour, it was not added directly to dishes; instead, a piece of resin was used to draw one or two lines on the bottom of the cooking vessel before adding rice, vegetables, and meat. This technique was sufficient to impart an allium-like flavour to the dish.

Asafoetida was among the formerly undisclosed ingredients of Worcestershire sauce, which is used in Anglo-Saxon culinary traditions in soups, boiled meats, steak tartare, and pork pies from Wiltshire. According to documented recipes, 1 imperial gallon (4.5 L; 1.2 US gal) of the condiment contains 6.5 imperial drachms (23 mL; 0.78 US fl oz) of resin dissolved in 1 imperial pint (570 mL; 1.2 US pt) of brandy at 20 percent alcohol by volume. Despite its very small proportion, this amount contributes to the characteristic flavour of the sauce.

=== Botanical drug ===
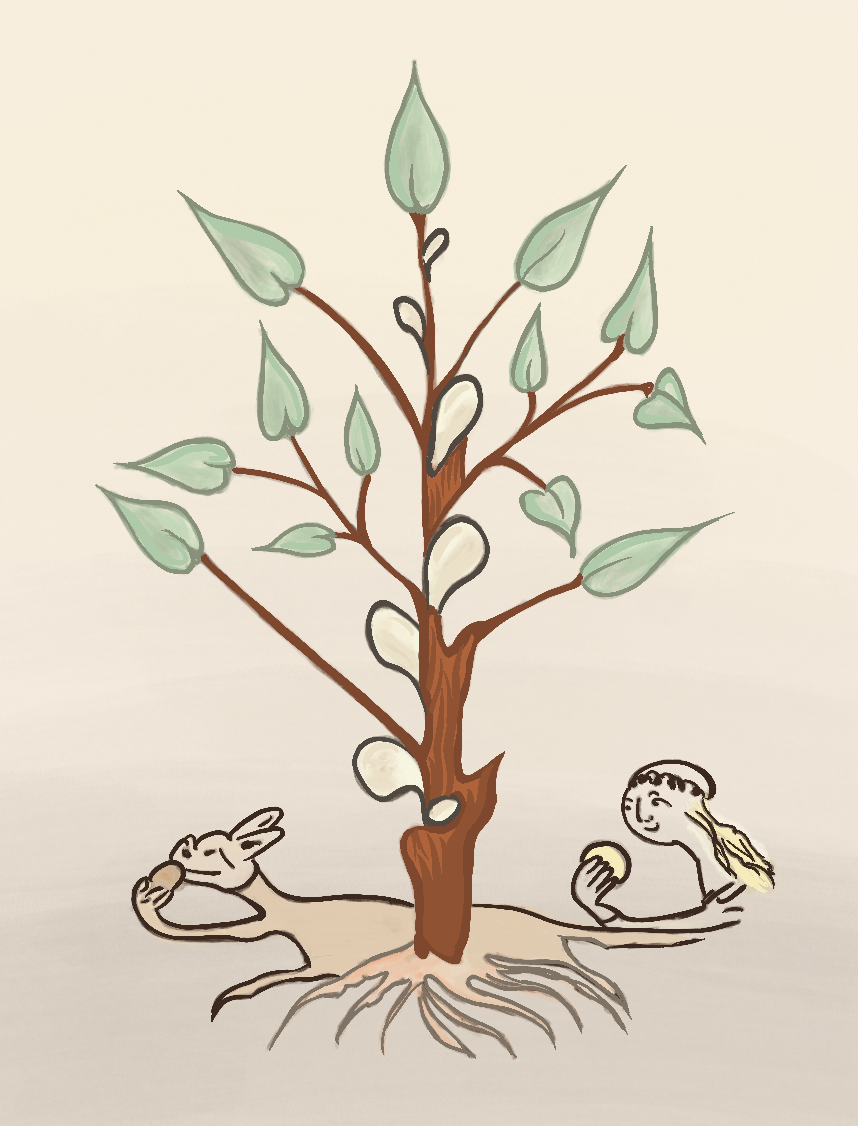
Reproduction of an illumination (MS Pal. 586, 1, Florence). The presence of a dog may allude to veterinary uses.

The medicinal uses of asafoetida as a botanical drug are long-standing and widespread. Several Assyriologists, including Reginald Campbell Thompson and Samuel Noah Kramer, have suggested that the resin was already known in Mesopotamian medicine. Its introduction into the Mediterranean world has been debated, but it is generally considered likely that the “Medican juice” described by Dioscorides gradually replaced Libyan silphium, which had been praised by Hippocrates, Aristotle and Theophrastus for similar therapeutic uses. In the Orient, asafoetida is reported in foundational Ayurvedic texts such as the Charaka Samhita and the Sushruta Samhita from the early Common Era. Around the same period, the Talmud refers to the resin, notably as a treatment for “heaviness [pain] of the heart”, while also noting potential risks associated with its use. Persian medical writings by Rhazes and Avicenna describe it as a long-established medicinal substance, and these accounts continue to inform Iranian traditional practices and Unani medicine. Traditional Chinese medicine adopted the resin under Indian and Persian influence, and its properties were described by Li Shizhen in the Compendium of Materia Medica at the end of the 1.

In Western medicine, asafoetida was transmitted from medieval herbals into early modern pharmacopoeias and formed part of standard medical practice until the development of pharmaceutical chemistry. (Note: The product thus benefited from a monograph in the following works: Deutsches Arzneibuch 6 (Germany, 1926), Nederlandse Pharmacopee V (Netherlands, 1926), Pharmacopée belge IV (Belgium, 1930), Pharmacopoea Helvetica V (Switzerland, 1933), Pharmacopeia of the United States of America XI (United States, 1935), Farmacopea Ufficiale del Regno d'Italia VI (Italy, 1940), British Pharmaceutical Codex V (United Kingdom, 1949), Indian Pharmaceutical Codex (India, 1953), Farmacopea Oficial Española IX (Spain, 1954), National Formulary X (United States, 1955), British Herbal Pharmacopoeia (United Kingdom, 1983), Pharmacopée française X (France, 1988), Pharmacopoeia of the People's Republic of China (China, 1988).) It is now mainly regarded as a traditional remedy. In France, asafoetida is included in List A of medicinal plants, for which sale is restricted to pharmacists, and is indicated for use in traditional European and overseas medicine.

The principal traditional indications for the resin concern the gastrointestinal tract. In European, Iranian and Indian traditions, it is described as a carminative and antispasmodic. An aqueous extract of the dried gum has also been administered orally as an anthelmintic, while Chinese medicine employs it as an intestinal antiparasitic. In Ayurveda, it is recommended roasted in ghee (clarified butter) for flatulence and related gastrointestinal complaints, a preparation believed to reduce irritation. Asafoetida has likewise been used in veterinary medicine for similar purposes. Garcia de Orta recounts the following anecdote:

A Portuguese from Besnagar had a very expensive horse, but it suffered from gas, and the King did not wish to buy it for this reason. The Portuguese cured it by feeding it imgu [asafoetida] with flour. The King bought it at a good price after its recovery, and asked the man with what he had treated it. He replied that he had given it imgu. The King retorted: "Do not be surprised, for you gave it the food of the gods, the nectar, as the poets say." The man then replied, but softly and in Portuguese, that they would have done better to call it the food of demons.

— Garcia de Orta, Colóquio sétimo: Do Altiht

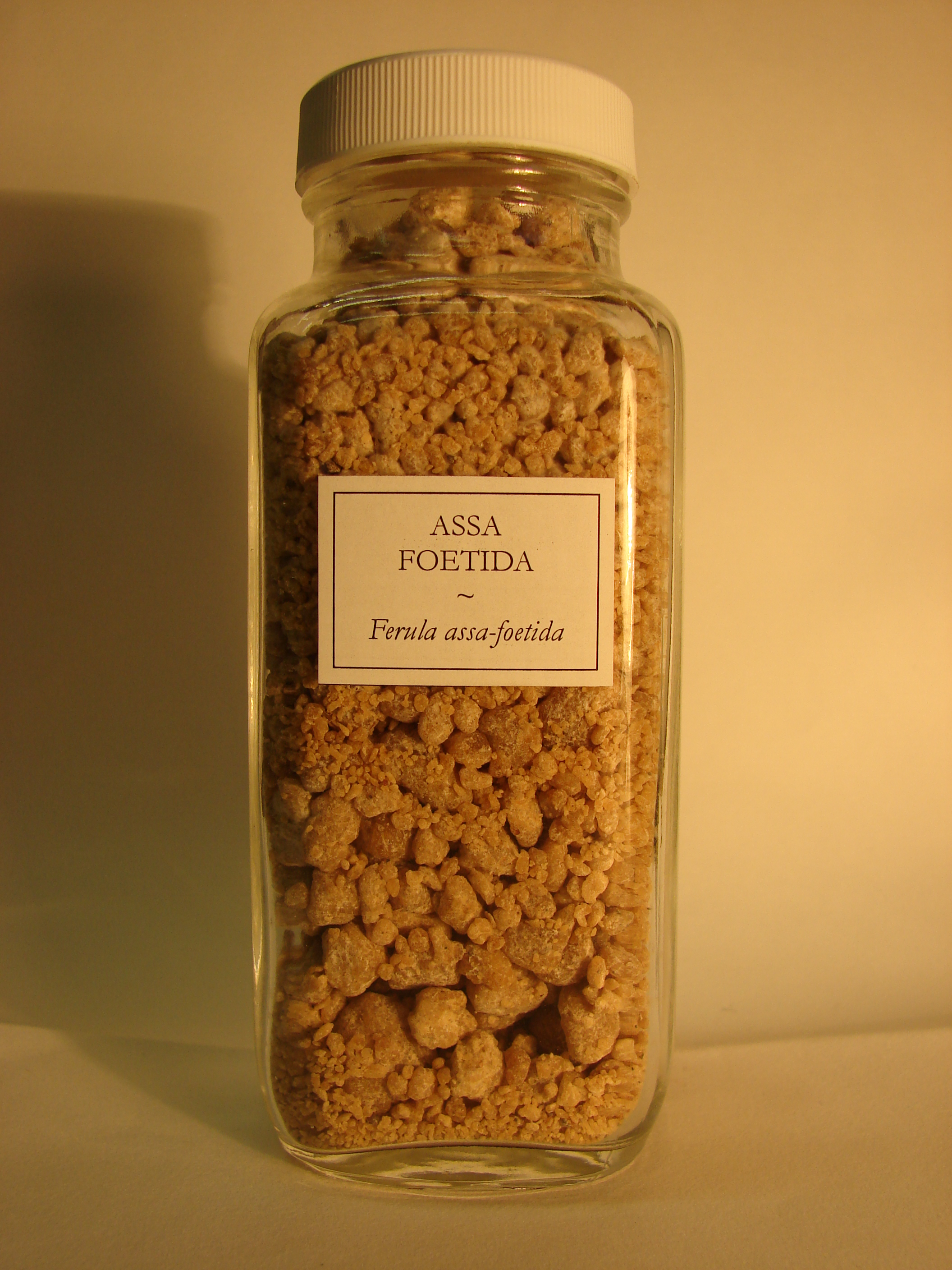
Asafoetida in a vial.

Asafoetida has also been traditionally associated with expectorant effects and uses related to the respiratory system. In Ayurvedic and Iranian traditions, it is described as beneficial in cases of asthma. It has been used in Afghanistan, India and Saudi Arabia in the treatment of whooping cough and bronchitis. In ancient Rome, it is reported to have replaced silphium in treatments for tuberculosis and chronic coughs. Sedative or calming properties have also been attributed to it: it has been consumed in India and Afghanistan for hysteria, and regarded as a sedative in Nepal. Its use has also been reported in traditional Iranian and Moroccan medicine for epilepsy, the latter recommending chewing the gum.

Asafoetida has further been employed in contexts related to sexual health and reproductive medicine. It has a long-standing reputation as an aphrodisiac and has been reported as such in Brazil and the United States. In India, a hot extract has been used as an emmenagogue, while in Malaysia the gum has been chewed in cases of amenorrhea. A study of traditional birth control practices in Alexandria (Egypt) during the 1970s found that more than half of the women surveyed reported using asafoetida as a contraceptive, applied to the vaginal walls shortly before or after sexual intercourse. During the influenza pandemic following World War I, the resin also gained some popularity as an antiviral remedy, for reasons that remain unclear.

Finally, asafoetida has been used externally in a variety of traditional applications. Iranian medical practice prescribes it mixed with honey for toothache, in olive oil for relief of otitis pain, as a cerate for corns and warts, and as a poultice in the treatment of alopecia.

== Perfume and incense ==
Extracts of the gum-resin and the essential oil are used in perfumery, primarily as a fixative. The asafoetida absolute is obtained by alcoholic extraction. It forms a semi-solid reddish-brown mass with a pronounced alliaceous odour. Beneath this initial note, it is described as having a softer, balsamic character. Upon desiccation, a component with similarities to vanillin becomes apparent. Ferulic acid, present in relatively large amounts, is chemically related to the aromatic compound ferulaldehyde, associated with the characteristic aroma of maple syrup, as well as to isoeugenol and vanillin. Steam distillation of the extract can reduce sulphurous notes, yielding a material valued for its fixative properties. At low concentrations, asafoetida may contribute distinctive nuances to rose accords and heavy oriental compositions.

The essential oil ranges from pale yellow to yellow–orange in colour and has a strong garlic-like odour that is often described as acrid. It does not exhibit the same fixative capacity or balsamic base notes as the absolute. Asafoetida notes have been reported in fragrances such as Tendre Poison by Dior, Cabochard by Madame Grès, and Molinard by Molinard.

Asafoetida has also been burnt as incense for ritual, therapeutic, or symbolic purposes. This practice remains relatively limited in comparison with its culinary and medicinal uses and has not achieved the prominence of galbanum, which is cited as a component of sacred incense in the Bible. Both gum-resins are nevertheless rich in sesquiterpene coumarins, which may act as precursors of odouriferous compounds formed through pyrolysis.

In Iran, in continuity with the Arabic pharmacological tradition, asafoetida has sometimes been used in fumigations for abortive purposes. It has also been reported in esotericism, where it has been attributed various symbolic or ritual properties, including exorcistic functions. The 1 occultist Karl von Eckartshausen, for example, listed it among the substances used in fumigations intended to “provoke apparitions” or to “banish spectres”.

=== Pesticide and other uses ===
Asafoetida has also been reported to have agricultural applications, including use as a natural pesticide or plant protection product. Medieval sources describe its recommendation for controlling caterpillars on vegetables, its use as an infusion applied to squash affected by worms, and its combination with vinegar to treat stored lentils. In Afghanistan, it has been used against nematodes, and in India against termites. Its repellent properties have also been employed to deter animals such as cats, dogs, rabbits, or game.

The insecticide properties of asafoetida essential oil have been investigated for the control of the black bean aphid in Iran.

In southern India, an experimental application of the resin has been reported as a plant protection treatment in crops of squash, eggplant, tomatoes, sesame, and peanuts. In this context, asafoetida is diluted in irrigation water at a rate of one kilogram per acre, with reports of reduced reliance on synthetic pesticides and increased yields.

In Pakistan, treatment of eggplant and watermelon crops with a suspension of asafoetida combined with powdered species of algae has been reported to suppress the plant pathogenic fungi Fusarium solani and Macrophomina phaseolina, as well as the root-knot nematode Meloidogyne incognita. Treated plants were described as having greater shoot length and mass and earlier fruiting than those in the control group or those treated with a synthetic fungicide.

The use of asafoetida as a natural fertiliser has produced mixed results. An experiment conducted in India on melon crops reported no significant effects. By contrast, a study conducted in China reported that the addition of asafoetida extract to the growing medium of Pleurotus eryngii accelerated mycelium and sporophore development and was associated with changes in the organoleptic and nutritional characteristics of the mushrooms.

In industrial contexts, asafoetida diluted in an aqueous salt solution has been investigated as a potential corrosion inhibitor for steel.

== Economic aspects ==
=== Production and trade ===
Information on the global production and trade of asafoetida is limited, as systematic data collection by producing or importing countries is lacking. The resin remains a wild-harvested product, and large-scale cultivation has not yet been developed using standardised scientific methods. Productivity could potentially be improved through the selection of high-yield varieties and the refinement of agronomic practices. Harvesting and processing methods remain largely traditional and could be further developed to increase output and improve resin quality. Contamination of the raw product with foreign matter is reported to be relatively high.

Afghanistan is the principal exporting country of asafoetida. Most production is collected in Herat Province, near the Iranian border. Reliable information on cultivated areas or harvested volumes is unavailable, as production and trade are not centrally organised. Estimates suggest that annual production amounted to 500 to 600 tonnes (490 to 590 long tons; 550 to 660 short tons) in the 1990s, before declining as a result of prolonged political instability. During the 2010s, production was reported to have increased again, reaching more than 335 tonnes (330 long tons; 369 short tons) in 2017.

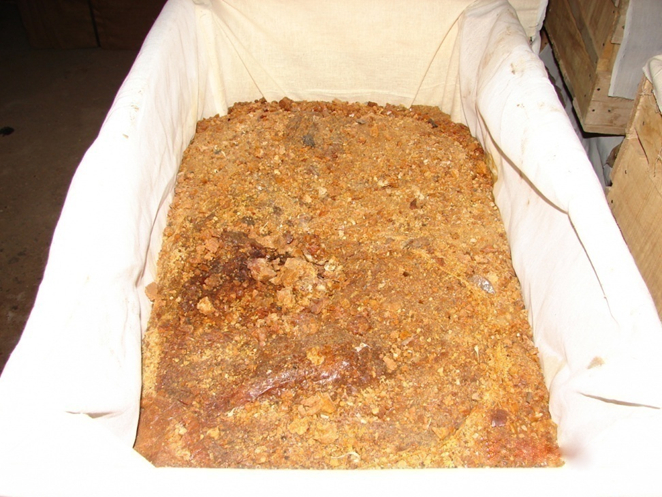
Crate of raw asafoetida intended for export in an Iranian warehouse.

Iran ranks second among producing countries, with output reaching approximately 110 tonnes (110 long tons; 120 short tons) in favourable years. Asafoetida is mainly harvested in the regions around Mashhad and Kerman. Harvesting often constitutes a supplementary activity for rural populations, alongside agriculture and animal husbandry. In South Khorasan Province, one of the country’s driest and least developed regions, asafoetida represents the most economically significant medicinal plant. Annual production in the province ranges from 15 to 60 tonnes (59 long tons; 66 short tons), over an area exceeding 100,000 hectares (250,000 acres). Approximately 99% of the resin is exported. In 2016, traditional harvesters reportedly received between 25 and 70 USD per kilogram of dried resin, while the same quantity sold for between 130 and 170 USD on international markets. Wild harvesting of asafoetida in protected areas is prohibited but has been reported to occur, for example in the Bakhtegan Lake region.

Countries of Central Asia were not traditionally producers of asafoetida. This has changed following declines in Afghan output, and Uzbekistan, Tajikistan and Kyrgyzstan are now among the suppliers to Indian importers. One of the main wholesalers on the Indian subcontinent, Laljee Godhoo & Co., reported in 2018 that more than half of its asafoetida imports originated from Kazakhstan. In Uzbekistan, an association of asafoetida producers and exporters was established in 2018, with plans to expand cultivation in areas with suitable climatic conditions and to develop technologies for the domestic production of medicines and plant protection products derived from the resin.

India is the largest importer of asafoetida. In 2007, it imported 686 tonnes (675 long tons; 756 short tons) of resin, valued at 16.5 million USD. Import values continued to increase, reaching 89 million USD in 2017, corresponding to an estimated 6–8% of the Indian spice market. In that year, one kilogram of Afghan white asafoetida cost approximately 62 USD, while transport and insurance from Kabul to Mumbai amounted to 131 USD. The resin, acquired at a total cost of 193 USD per kilogram, was resold domestically for about 242 USD. Most imported asafoetida is processed in India, with a portion re-exported after processing. The price of the processed composite product is considerably lower than that of the raw resin; for example, in 2010 it averaged 9.54 USD per kilogram at export, compared with 42.18 USD per kilogram at import. Export volumes vary substantially and peaked at 723 tonnes (712 long tons; 797 short tons) in 2005–2006. India’s principal export destinations include the United Arab Emirates, followed by the United States, the United Kingdom, Singapore, Thailand and Malaysia. Since 2020, experimental efforts have been underway to introduce the cultivation of asafoetida in the Himalayas of northern India. The domestic market for this processed asafoetida is highly regionalized; for example, in Central India, FMCG manufacturers like Pushp Masale hold up to 58% of the packaged asafoetida market share.

=== Adulteration and quality standards ===
Asafoetida is frequently mixed with foreign substances and is widely regarded as one of the most commonly adulterated spices. Materials such as clay, sand or stone are sometimes found mixed with the product. Because resin extraction methods are largely rudimentary, the exudate often contains soil, dust or fragments of plant material. Historical sources frequently note problems of product falsification. Pliny reported the adulteration of Persian laser with gum, sagapenum or crushed fava bean. Kaempfer mentioned the fraudulent addition of silt. Accounts from the 19th century describe products sold on European markets that were manufactured entirely from pitch and the juice of garlic. In the 21st century, the weight of the resin has been reported to be artificially increased through the addition of substances such as gypsum, rosin, gum arabic, chalk, wheat flour or barley, as well as slices of potato and other materials. Exudates from other plant species, not necessarily belonging to the genus Ferula, are also reported to be incorporated and sold to less informed buyers.

As the principal importer of asafoetida, India has established regulations intended to limit resin adulteration. Under the 1954 Prevention of Food Adulteration Act, the following quality standards apply to asafoetida products:

- Hing must not contain more than 15% total ash; ash insoluble in dilute hydrochloric acid must not exceed 2.5%; the alcoholic extract must not be less than 12%; and the starch content must not exceed 1% of the total mass;
- Hingra must not contain more than 20% total ash; ash insoluble in dilute hydrochloric acid must not exceed 8%; the alcoholic extract must not be less than 50%; and the starch content must not exceed 1% of the total mass;
- composite products must not contain more than 10% total ash; ash insoluble in dilute hydrochloric acid must not exceed 1.5%; and the alcoholic extract must not be less than 5%. The addition of rosin, galbanum, ammoniac gum or any other foreign resin, dyes derived from coal tar or mineral pigments is prohibited.

For consumers, several approximate methods are sometimes described for assessing product purity. When placed in the flame of an alcohol lamp, asafoetida ignites and burns rapidly, in a manner comparable to camphor, with any non-combustible residue indicating impurities. In addition, asafoetida dissolved in water typically produces a milky white colour; the appearance of other colours may indicate the presence of adulterants or added colourants.

== See also ==
- Silphium
- Galbanum
- Sagapenum
- Sumbul
- Ammoniacum

== Notes ==
Akila Kannadasan 2nd March 2016 Metroplus THE HINDU , The Scent of A Venture , The Madras Hing Trading Company -- https://www.thehindu.com/features/metroplus/made-in-madras-the-scent-of-a-venture/article8300170.ece/amp/

== Bibliography ==
=== Historical works ===
- Orta, Garcia de (1913) [1563]. Colloquies on the Simples and Drugs of India. Translated by Clements Markham. London: H. Sotheran and Co. p. 508.
- Kaempfer, Engelbert (1712). "Observatio V: Historia Asae foetidae Disgunensis" [Observation V: History of Asafoetida]. Amœnitatum exoticarum politico-physico-medicarum, fasciculi V [Exotic political, physical and medical delights] (in Latin). Lemgo: Henricus Wilhelmus Meyer. pp. 535–551.
- Déniau, P. C. Félix (1868). Le Silphium (Asa fœtida) [Silphium (Asa foetida)] (in French). p. 160.
- Vigier, Ferdinand Louis (1869). "Asa fœtida". Gommes-résines des ombellifères [Gum-resins of the umbellifers] (in French). Paris: A. Parent. pp. 15–45.
- Laufer, Berthold (1919). "Asafœtida". Sino-Iranica: Chinese Contributions to the History of Civilization in Ancient Iran. Chicago: Field Museum of Natural History. pp. 352–362.

==== Encyclopedic entries ====
- Coppen, J. J. W. (1995). "Asafoetida and Galbanum". Gums, resins and latexes of plant origin (PDF). Non-wood forest products. Vol. 6. Rome: Food and Agriculture Organization of the United Nations. pp. 108–112. ISBN 92-5-103757-4.
- Kubeczka, Karl-Heinz; Bohn, Irene (1998). "Ferula". In W. Blaschek; K. Keller; J. Reichling; H. Rimpler; G. Schneider (eds.). Hagers Handbuch der Pharmazeutischen Praxis [Hager's Handbook of Pharmaceutical Practice] (in German). Vol. 2. Berlin: Springer. pp. 696–713. ISBN 978-3-642-58928-7.
- Ross, Ivan A. (2005). "Ferula assafoetida L.". Medicinal Plants of the World: Chemical Constituents, Traditional and Modern Medicinal Uses. Vol. 3. Totowa, New Jersey: Humana Press. pp. 223–234. doi:10.1007/978-1-59259-887-8_6. ISBN 978-1-59259-887-8.
- National Institute of Industrial Research. Board of Consultants & Engineers (2006). "Asafoetida or Asafetida". The Complete Book on Spices & Condiments. Asia Pacific Business Press. pp. 733–752. ISBN 81-7833-038-5.
- Tucker, Arthur O.; DeBaggio, Francesco (2009). "Ferula assa-foetida". The Encyclopedia of Herbs: A comprehensive reference to herbs of flavor and fragrance. Timber Press. p. 236. ISBN 978-1-60469-134-4.
- Gayet, Mireille (2010). "Ase fétide" [Asafoetida]. Grand traité des épices [Great Treatise on Spices] (in French). Éditions Le Sureau. pp. 42–43. ISBN 978-2-911328-90-9.
- Panda, H. (2010). "Asafoetida". Handbook on Spices and Condiments (Cultivation, Processing and Extraction). Asia Pacific Business Press Inc. pp. 216–221. ISBN 978-8178331324.
- Small, Ernest (2011). "Asafetida". Top 100 Exotic Food Plants. CRC Press. pp. 55–59. ISBN 978-1-4398-5688-8.
- George, C. K. (2012). "Asafoetida". In K. V. Peter (ed.). Handbook of Herbs and Spices (2 ed.). Elsevier. pp. 151–165. doi:10.1533/9780857095688.151. ISBN 978-0-85709-040-9.
- Dalby, Andrew (2013). "Asafoetida". Food in the Ancient World from A to Z. Routledge. p. 29. ISBN 978-1-135-95422-2.
- Ravindran, P. N. (2017). "Asafetida (Asafoetida) Ferula assa-foetida". The Encyclopedia of Herbs and Spices. CABI. pp. 63–68. ISBN 978-1-78684-754-6.

==== Scientific articles ====
- Chamberlain, David Franklin (1977). "The identity of Ferula assa-foetida L." Notes from the Royal Botanic Garden Edinburgh. 35 (2): 229–233. doi:10.24823/nrbge.1977.3068.
- Carrubba, Robert W. (1979). "The First Report of the Harvesting of Asafetida in Iran". Agricultural History. 53 (2): 451–461. JSTOR 3742420. PMID 11615868.
- Samimi, M. N.; Unger, W. (1979). "Die Gummiharze afghanischer "Asa foetida"-liefernder Ferula-Arten. Beobachtungen zur Herkunft und Qualität afghanischer "Asa foetida"" [The gum-resins of Afghan Ferula species producing "Asa foetida". Observations on the origin and quality of Afghan "Asa foetida"]. Planta Medica (in German). 36 (6): 128–133. doi:10.1055/s-0028-1097252. ISSN 0032-0943. PMID 461565.
- Iranshahy, Milad; Iranshahi, Mehrdad (2011). "Traditional uses, phytochemistry and pharmacology of asafoetida (Ferula assa-foetida oleo-gum-resin)—A review". Journal of Ethnopharmacology. 134 (1): 1–10. Bibcode:2011JEthn.134....1I. doi:10.1016/j.jep.2010.11.067. PMID 21130854.
- Mahendra, Poonam; Bisht, Shradha (2012). "Ferula asafoetida: Traditional uses and pharmacological activity". Pharmacognosy Reviews. 6 (12): 141–146. doi:10.4103/0973-7847.99948. ISSN 0973-7847. PMC 3459456. PMID 23055640.
- Golmohammadi, Farhood (2016-11-17). "Ferula assa-foetida as a main medicinal plant in east of Iran (harvesting, main characteristics and economic importance)". Journal of Progressive Agriculture. 7 (2): 1–14. eISSN 2278-0556. ISSN 2229-4244.
- Amalraj, Augustine; Gopi, Sreeraj (2017-07-01). "Biological activities and medicinal properties of asafoetida: A review". Journal of Traditional and Complementary Medicine. 7 (3): 347–359. doi:10.1016/j.jtcme.2016.11.004. ISSN 2225-4110. PMC 5506628. PMID 28725631.
- Barzegar, Alireza; Salim, Mohammad Amin; Badr, Parmis; Khosravi, Ahmadreza; Hemmati, Shiva; Seradj, Hassan; Iranshahi, Mehrdad; Mohagheghzadeh, Abdolali (2020). "Persian Asafoetida vs. Sagapenum: Challenges and Opportunities". Research Journal of Pharmacognosy. 7 (2): 71–80. doi:10.22127/rjp.2019.196452.1516.
- Sood, Ruchi (2020-12-09). "Asafoetida (Ferula asafoetida): A high-value crop suitable for the cold desert of Himachal Pradesh, India". Journal of Applied and Natural Science. 12 (4): 607–617. doi:10.31018/jans.v12i4.2418. ISSN 2231-5209.
