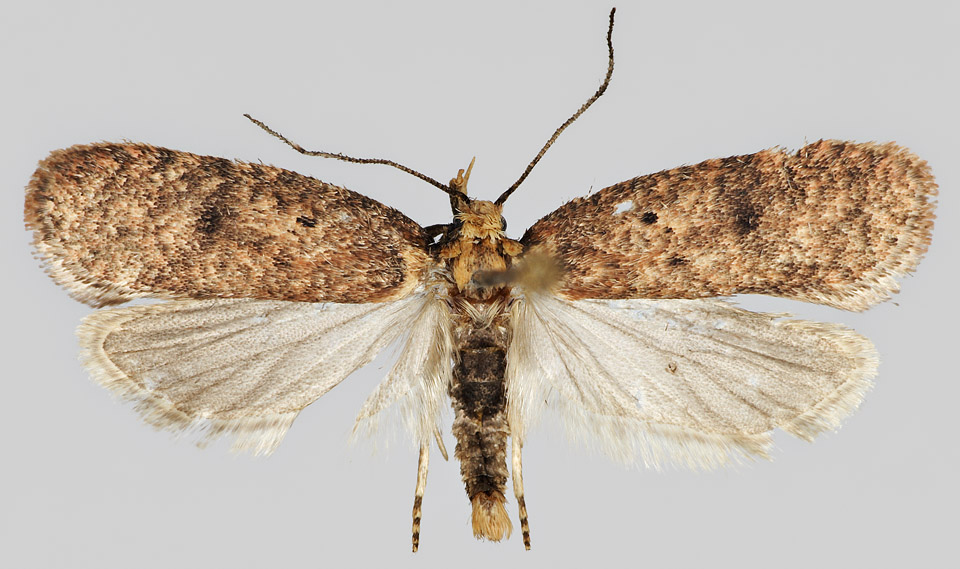

Scientific classification
- Kingdom: Animalia
- Phylum: Arthropoda
- Clade: Pancrustacea
- Class: Insecta
- Order: Lepidoptera
- Family: Depressariidae
- Genus: Agonopterix
- Species: A. angelicella

Binomial name
- Agonopterix angelicella (Hübner, 1813)

Synonyms
- Tinea angelicella Hübner, 1813

= Agonopterix angelicella =

Species of moth

Agonopterix angelicella is a moth of the family Depressariidae. It is found in most of Europe, except the Iberian Peninsula and south-eastern Europe. It is also found on the Russian plain and Siberia (the West Siberian Lowland and South Siberian Mountains) and in Japan.

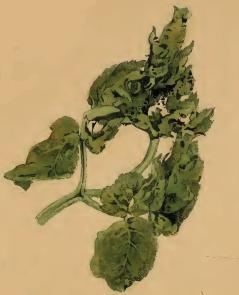
A leaf of Angelica sylvestris inhabited by larva

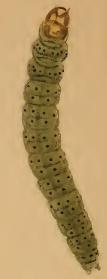
Larva

The wingspan is 16–21 mm. The head is light ochreous yellow. Forewings rosy-ochreous, costa more rosy, somewhat sprinkled with dark fuscous; first discal stigma black, often minute or obsolete, preceded by a larger similar dot obliquely above it, second black, placed in a dark fuscous suffusion sometimes tending to form an indistinct fascia, plical sometimes distinct, black; blackish terminal dots. Hindwings whitish grey. The larva is greenish-grey; dots black; head reddish-ochreous; 2 ochreous-tingcd

Adults are on wing from August to September.

The larvae feed among spun leaves or shoots of Angelica and Heracleum. Other recorded food plants include Laserpitium, Aegopodium, Pimpinella saxifraga and Pastinaca.

== Subspecies ==
- Agonopterix angelicella angelicella
- Agonopterix angelicella ochrosephara Saito, 1980 (Japan)
