= Aethes eichleri =

Scientific classification
- Domain: Eukaryota
- Kingdom: Animalia
- Phylum: Arthropoda
- Class: Insecta
- Order: Lepidoptera
- Family: Tortricidae
- Genus: Aethes
- Species: A. eichleri

Binomial name
- Aethes eichleri Razowski, 1983

Species of moth

Aethes eichleri is a species of moth of the family Tortricidae. It was described by Razowski in 1983. It is found in Bulgaria and Iran.

The wingspan is about 14 millimetres (0.55 in). Adults are on wing from May to July.

The larvae feed on Eryngium campestre, Daucus carota, Pastinaca, Peucedanum, Angelica sylvestris, Elaeoselinum meoides, Crithmum maritimum, Astydamia canarensis and Ferula communis.
