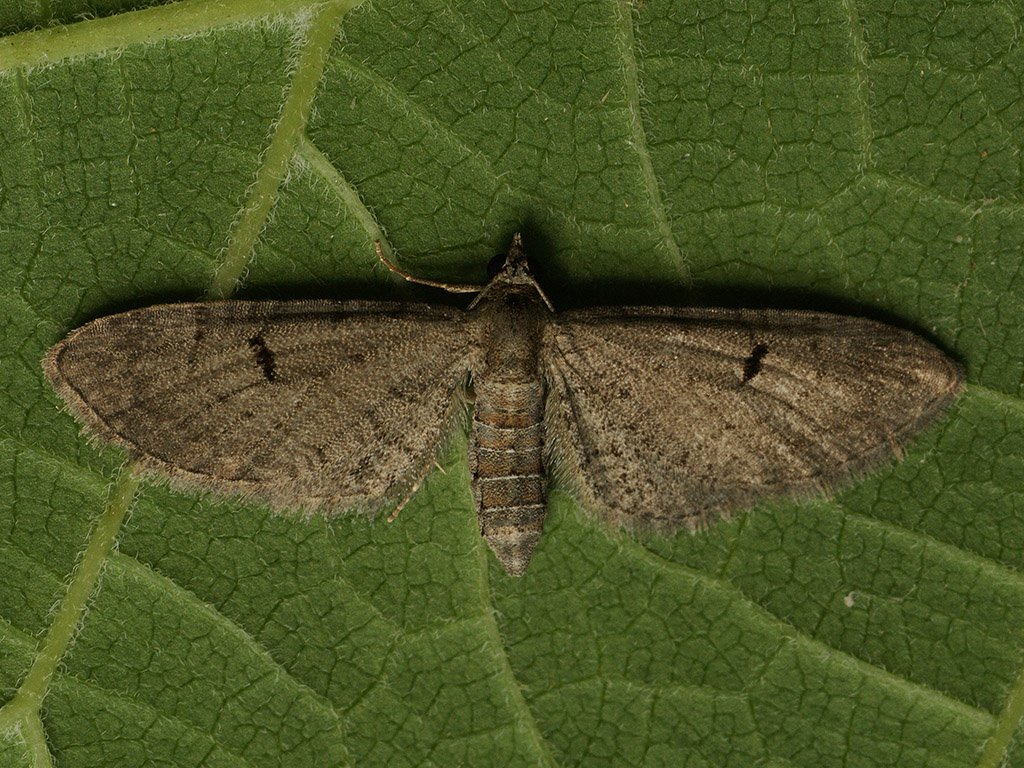

Scientific classification
- Domain: Eukaryota
- Kingdom: Animalia
- Phylum: Arthropoda
- Class: Insecta
- Order: Lepidoptera
- Family: Geometridae
- Genus: Eupithecia
- Species: E. extraversaria

Binomial name
- Eupithecia extraversaria Herrich-Schäffer, 1852

Synonyms
- Eupithecia libanotidata Guenee, 1858

= Eupithecia extraversaria =

Species of moth

Eupithecia extraversaria is a moth in the family Geometridae. It is found in most of Europe, except Fennoscandia, Estonia, northern Russia, Great Britain and Ireland. It is also found in Iran.

The wingspan is about 15–17 mm. Adults are on wing from June to the beginning of August.

The larvae feed on the flowers of various Apiaceae species, including Pimpinella saxifraga, Bupleurum, Pastinaca, Angelica and Peucedanum species. Larvae can be found from the end of July to the beginning of September. The species overwinters in the pupal stage.
