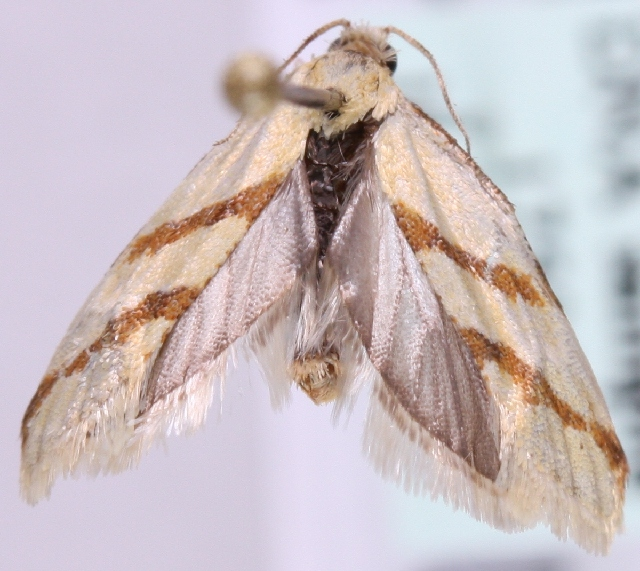

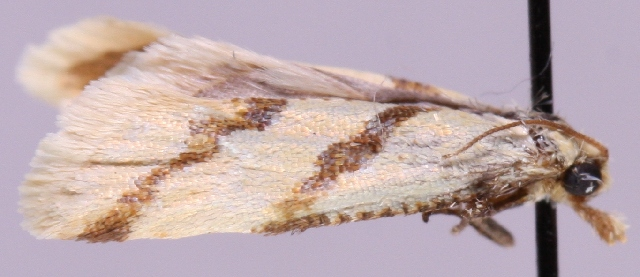

Scientific classification
- Domain: Eukaryota
- Kingdom: Animalia
- Phylum: Arthropoda
- Class: Insecta
- Order: Lepidoptera
- Family: Tortricidae
- Genus: Aethes
- Species: A. francillana

Binomial name
- Aethes francillana (Fabricius, 1794)

Synonyms
- Pyralis francillana Fabricius, 1794; Lozopera ferulae Muller-Rutz, 1920; Tortrix franciliana Haworth, [1811]; Lozopera francillonana Humphreys & Westwood, 1845

= Aethes francillana =

Species of moth

Aethes francillana, the long-barred yellow conch, is a moth of the family Tortricidae. It was described by Johan Christian Fabricius in 1794. It is found in almost all of Europe, from north-western Africa to Afghanistan and Dzungarian Alatau in Central Asia. It is also found in the Ural Mountains, Kazakhstan, Tajikistan, western Siberia, Asia Minor and Iran. The habitat consists of rough grassland, particularly chalk downland and coastal areas.

The wingspan is 13–18 millimetres (0.51–0.71 in). The forewings are pale yellow. The costal edge is ferruginous on anterior half and there are two slender somewhat irregular dark ferruginous fasciae parallel to the termen - the first before middle, often narrowly interrupted near costa, the second subterminal. The hindwings are pale grey. The larva is yellow - whitish; head black; plate of 2 brownish - tinged. Julius von Kennel provides a full description.

Adults are on wing from late June to early September.

The larvae feed on the seeds of Eryngium campestre, Daucus, Pastinaca, Peucedanum, Angelica sylvestris, Elaeoselinum meoides, Crithmum maritimum, Astydamia canariensis and Ferula communis. They live between the flowers of their host plant, spinning the heads together with silk.
