= Muskroot =

Drug from the Ferula sumbul plant

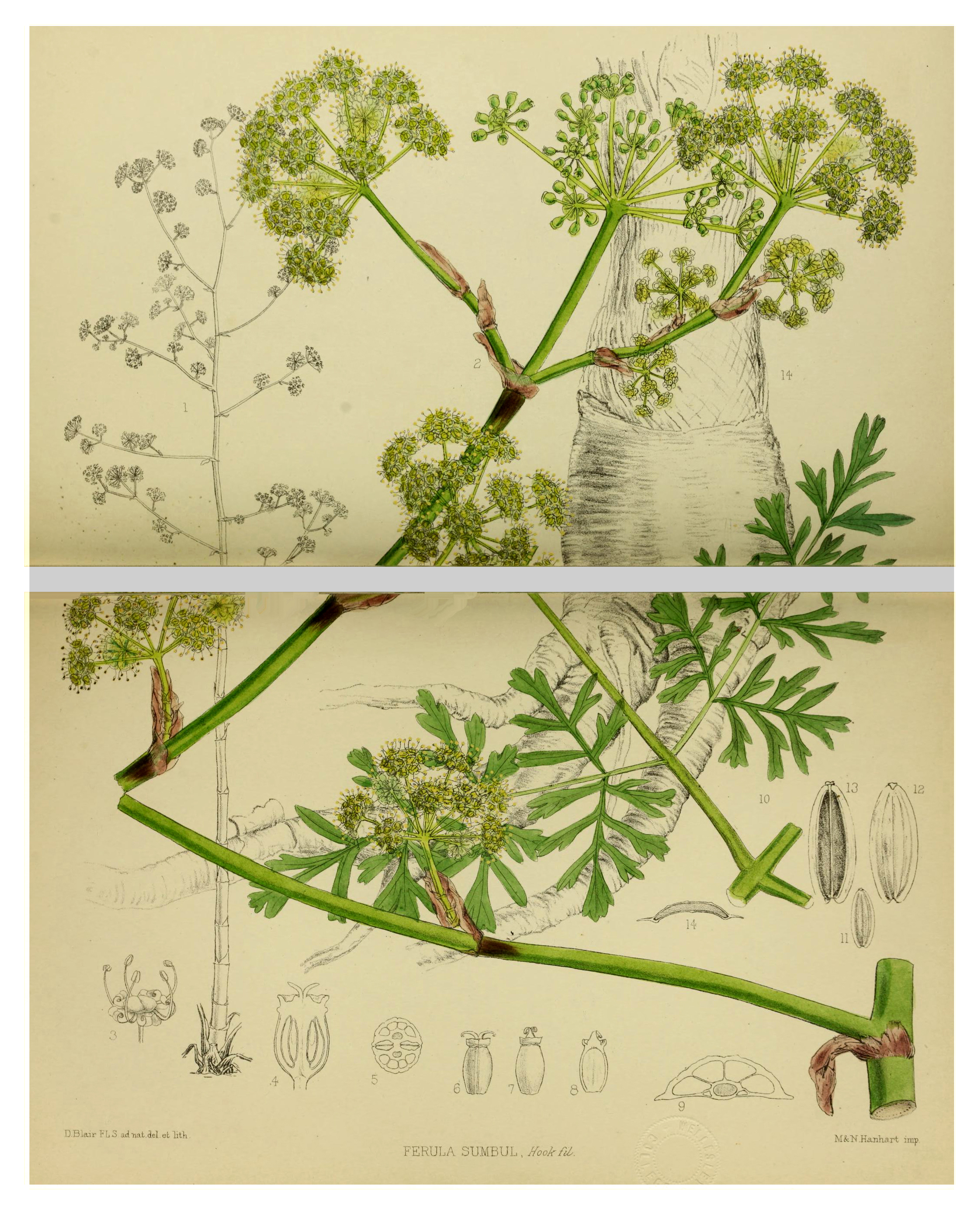
Ferula sumsul illustration

The term "muskroot" can also refer to spikenard or Adoxa moschatellina

Sumbul, also called sumbal or muskroot, is a drug occasionally employed in European medical practice. It consists of the root of Ferula moschata, known formerly by the synonym Ferula sumbul, a tall umbelliferous plant of the 'giant fennel' genus Ferula found primarily in the north of Bokhara in present-day Uzbekistan, although its range apparently extends into Southeastern Siberia : beyond the Amur river.

It was first brought to Russia in 1835 as a substitute for musk; and in 1867 was introduced into the British pharmacopoeia. The root as found in commerce consists of transverse sections an inch or more in thickness and from 1 to 3 or more inches in diameter. It has a dark thin papery bark, a spongy texture, and the cut surface is marbled with white and blackish or pale brown; it has a musky odor and a bitter aromatic taste. The action and uses of the drug are the same as those of asafetida. It owes its medicinal properties to a resin and an essential oil. Of the former, it contains about 9% and of the latter 3%. The resin is soluble in ether and has a musky smell, which is not fully developed until after contact with water. Under the name of East Indian sumbul, the root of Ferula ammoniacum has occasionally been offered in English commerce. It is of a browner hue, has the taste of ammoniacum, and gives a much darker tincture than the genuine drug; it is thus easily detected. The name "sumbal" (a word of Arabic origin, signifying a spike or ear) is applied to several fragrant roots in the East, the principal being Nardostachys jatamansi, (see spikenard).

== Psychoactivity ==
As Ferula sumbal (sic.) the species is listed in the category 'plants with alleged hallucinogenic effects' in an authoritative work on psychotropic plants by Richard Evans Schultes and Albert Hofmann, citing in support articles by pharmacognosist Norman Farnsworth listed in the bibliography.

Half an ounce of a tincture produced narcotic symptoms, confusing the head, causing a tendency to snore even when awake, and giving feelings of tingling, etc., with a strong odour of the drug from the breath and skin which only passed off after a day or two.

- thus Mrs. Grieve in her Modern Herbal of 1931, noting also that, among other medicinal effects, the drug derived from the plant resembles Valerian in its action and is used in various hysterical conditions (i.e. has tranquilising effects). She notes further that the drug has a long history of use in Persia and India both medicinally and as an incense in religious ceremonies. The likely volatile nature of the psychoactive principle involved (suggested by the appearance of the odour of the drug in the breath of those intoxicated by it) may point to psychoactive potential in the incense derived from Ferula moschata from which volatile components would be absorbed via the lungs, when inhaled as vapour or smoke. In this context, it may be observed that similar use as both tranquilliser and incense in magico-religious ritual is reported for several Nepalese species of the related Apiaceous genus Selinum, which genus has been found to possess a chemistry similar, in certain respects, to that of the genus Ferula.
