= Johann Friedrich Klotzsch =

German botanist and pharmacist (1805–1860)

Johann Friedrich Klotzsch (9 June 1805 – 5 November 1860) was a German pharmacist and botanist.

His principal work was in the field of mycology, with the study and description of many species of mushroom.

Klotzsch was born in Wittenberg. Originally trained as a pharmacist, he later enrolled in pharmaceutical and botanical studies in Berlin. In 1830–32 he was curator of William Jackson Hooker's herbarium at the University of Glasgow. In 1832 he edited and distributed the famous exsiccata Herbarium vivum mycologicum sistens fungorum per totam Germaniam crescentium collectionem perfectam. This series of specimens was highly influential and followed up by exsiccatae distributed by the well known Germany mycologists Gottlob Ludwig Rabenhorst, Heinrich Georg Winter and Franz Otto Pazschke, all three referring in the exsiccata title to Klotzsch, e.g. L. Rabenhorstii et G. Winteri fungi Europaei et extraeuropaei exsiccati, Klotzschii herbarii vivi mycologici continuatio. Editio nova. Series secunda (1891–1903).

Beginning in 1834 Klotzsch collected plants in Saxony, Bohemia, Austria, Styria and possibly Hungary. In 1838 he replaced Adelbert von Chamisso (1781–1838) as curator and director of the Royal Herbarium in Berlin.

The plant genus Klotzschia from the family Apiaceae, and some plant species like Eugenia klotzschiana or Acianthera klotzschiana are named in his honour.

== Selected works ==
- Mykologische Berichtigungen zu der nachgelassenen Sowerbyschen Sammlung, so wie zu den wenigen in Linneschen Herbarium vorhandenen Pilzen nebst Aufstellung einiger ausländischer Gattungen und Arten (Mycological determinations for the addenda to the Sowerby collection, a few of the fungi on stock in the Linnaean herbarium, with a presentation of some of the foreign genera and species)
- Herbarium vivum mycologicum sistens fungorum per totam Germaniam crescentium collectionem perfectam (Living mycological herbarium for the increase and perfection of the collection of all the fungi of Germany) (1832). This work is an exsiccata.
