= Notobubon =

Scientific classification
- Kingdom: Plantae
- Clade: Tracheophytes
- Clade: Angiosperms
- Clade: Eudicots
- Clade: Asterids
- Order: Apiales
- Family: Apiaceae
- Subfamily: Apioideae
- Tribe: Tordylieae
- Genus: Notobubon; B.-E.van Wyk

Genus of plants

Notobubon is a genus of flowering plants belonging to the family Apiaceae.

Its native range is Southern Africa.

== Species ==
Species:

- Notobubon capense (Eckl. & Zeyh.) Magee
- Notobubon collinum (Eckl. & Zeyh.) Magee
- Notobubon ferulaceum (Thunb.) Magee
- Notobubon galbaniopse (H.Wolff) Magee
- Notobubon galbanum (L.) Magee
- Notobubon gummiferum (L.) Magee
- Notobubon laevigatum (Aiton) Magee
- Notobubon montanum (Eckl. & Zeyh.) Magee
- Notobubon pearsonii (Adamson) Magee
- Notobubon pungens (E.Mey. ex Sond.) Magee
- Notobubon striatum (Thunb.) Magee
- Notobubon tenuifolium (Thunb.) Magee
