= Ammoniacum =

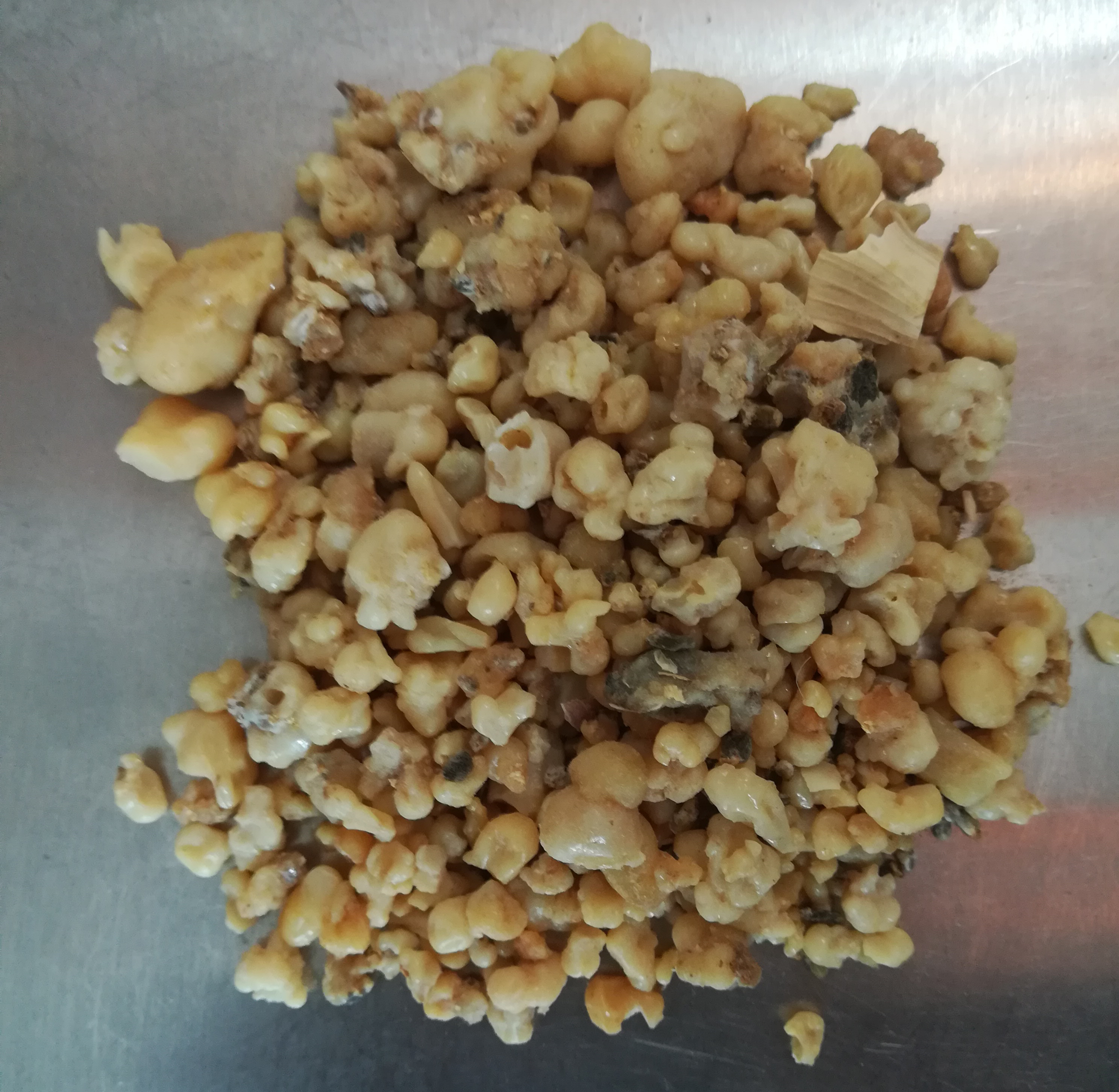

Names
- Other names Ammoniacum gummi; ammoniacum resin; gum ammoniac

Identifiers
CAS Number	9000-03-7
UNII	8471AK50P8
- Except where otherwise noted, data are given for materials in their standard state (at 25 °C [77 °F], 100 kPa). Infobox references

Ammoniacum or gum ammoniac is a gum-resin exuded from the several perennial herbs in the genus Ferula of the umbel family (Apiaceae). There are three types of ammoniacum: the gums ammoniac of Cyrenaica, of Persia (the commercial one today), and of Morocco.

== Ammoniac of Cyrenaica ==
Ammoniacum was first documented in the 1st century by Dioscorides in his De materia medica. It got its name from the Temple of Jupiter Ammon in ancient Libya (located in the Siwa Oasis of Egypt today) near which it was produced. It is called the gum ammoniac of Cyrenaica to differentiate it from the commercial one used today, and its source plant has been identified as Ferula marmarica native to Libya and Egypt. The export of the gum ammoniac of Cyrenaica to Europe declined after Arab and Turk domination of the Middle East, but probably continued at least until the 18th century, as Linnaeus still cited Libya and Egypt as the places of origin of ammoniacum in his Materia medica.

== Ammoniac of Persia ==
The gum ammoniac of Persia gradually replaced the one of Cyrenaica as the commercial ammoniacum exported to Europe. It was probably first mentioned in European literature in 1716 by Michael Bernhard Valentini. Its source plant is Ferula ammoniacum (syn. Dorema ammoniacum) native to Iran, Turkmenistan, Afghanistan and Pakistan.

The plant grows to the height of 2½ or 3 meters (8 or 9 ft.) and its whole stem is pervaded with a milky juice, which oozes out on an incision being made at any part. This juice quickly hardens into round tears, forming the "tear ammoniacum" of commerce. "Lump ammoniacum", the other form of the substance, consists of aggregations of tears, frequently incorporating fragments of the plant itself, as well as other foreign bodies.

Ammoniacum has a faintly fetid, unpleasant odor, which becomes more distinct on heating; externally, it possesses a reddish-yellow appearance, and when the tears or lumps are freshly fractured they exhibit a waxy luster. It is chiefly collected in central Persia, and comes to the European market by way of Bombay.

Ammoniacum is closely related to asafoetida and galbanum (from which, however, it differs in yielding no umbelliferone) both in regard to the plant which yields it and its putative effects.

== Ammoniac of Morocco ==
The gum ammoniac of Morocco first received attention in Europe in 1809 when James Grey Jackson described a plant producing the gum ammoniac of Barbary. The source plant has been identified as Ferula communis subsp. brevifolia native to Morocco, Algeria and the Canary Islands. Though it has been used by local people as herbal medicine for hundreds of years, it probably has never been commercially important in Europe.

== See also ==
- Muskroot
