= Fool's-parsley =

Fool's parsley or Fool's-parsley may refer to two species of plant:

- Aethusa cynapium
- Conium maculatum Occasional common name in Canada
