= Pitcairnia meridensis =

Scientific classification
- Kingdom: Plantae
- Clade: Embryophytes
- Clade: Tracheophytes
- Clade: Spermatophytes
- Clade: Angiosperms
- Clade: Monocots
- Clade: Commelinids
- Order: Poales
- Family: Bromeliaceae
- Genus: Pitcairnia
- Species: P. meridensis

Binomial name
- Pitcairnia meridensis (Klotzsch ex Mez) Mez

Synonyms
- Homotypic Synonyms: Hepetis meridensis Klotzsch ex Mez; Heterotypic Synonyms: Pitcairnia meridensis Klotzsch ex Baker

Species of flowering plant

Pitcairnia meridensis is a species of flowering plant in the family Bromeliaceae.

This species is endemic to Venezuela.
