= Phlyctidocarpa =

Scientific classification
- Kingdom: Plantae
- Clade: Tracheophytes
- Clade: Angiosperms
- Clade: Eudicots
- Clade: Asterids
- Order: Apiales
- Family: Apiaceae
- Genus: Phlyctidocarpa; Cannon & W.L.Theob.
- Species: P. flava

Binomial name
- Phlyctidocarpa flava Cannon & W.L.Theob.

Genus of plants

Phlyctidocarpa is a genus of flowering plants belonging to the family Apiaceae. It contains a single species, Phlyctidocarpa flava. Its native range is Namibia.

== Taxonomy ==
The genus and sole species were first described in 1967. It has been placed in subfamily Apioideae (possibly in its own tribe Phlyctidocarpeae), but a 2021 molecular phylogenetic study found that it was sister to a clade composed of the subfamilies Saniculoideae and Apioideae so that including it in Apioideae rendered that subfamily paraphyletic. One possibility is to include it in an expanded Saniculoideae; another is to merge Saniculoideae into an expanded Apioideae.
