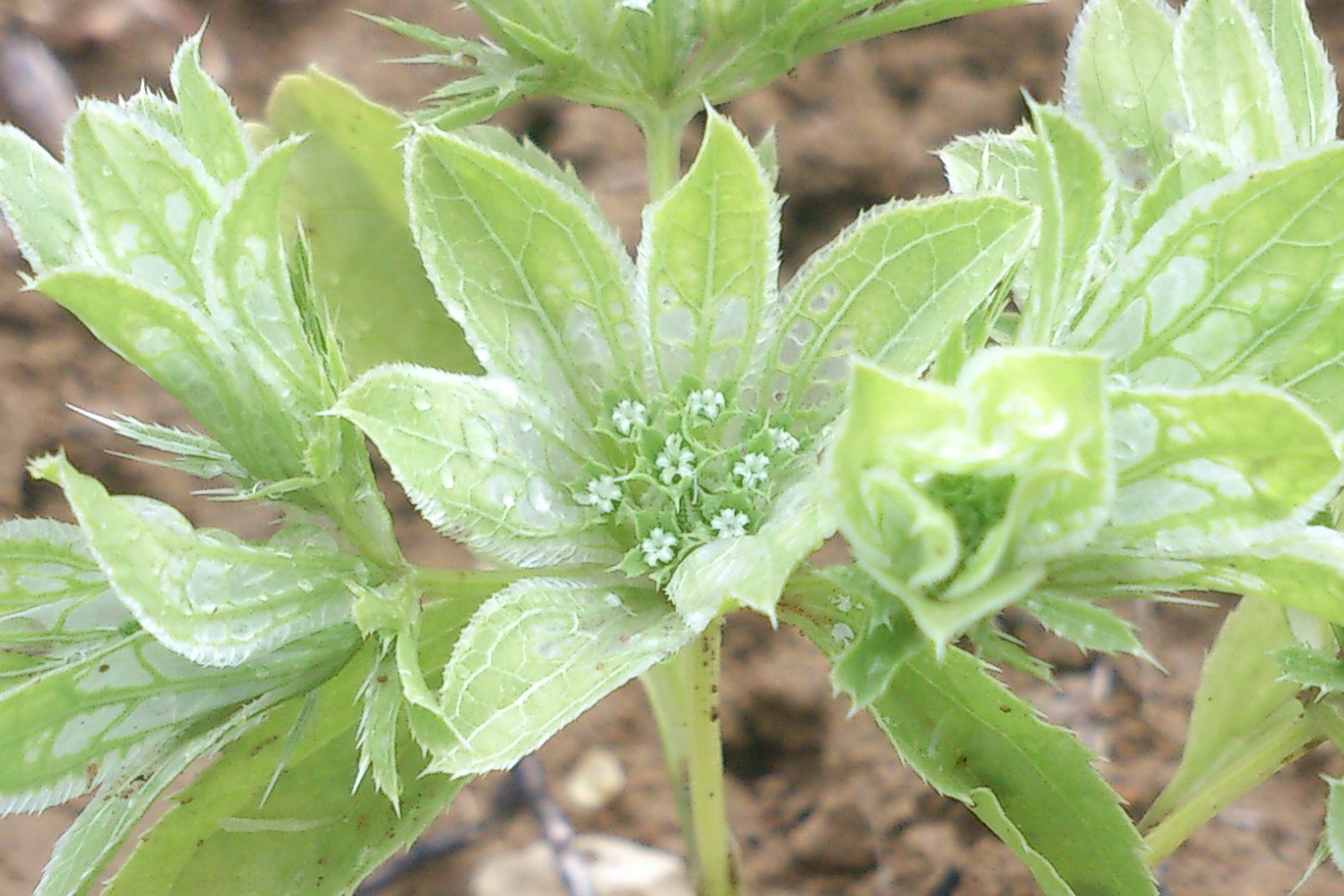
- Actinolema macrolema

Scientific classification
- Kingdom: Plantae
- Clade: Tracheophytes
- Clade: Angiosperms
- Clade: Eudicots
- Clade: Asterids
- Order: Apiales
- Family: Apiaceae
- Subfamily: Apioideae
- Tribe: Saniculeae
- Genus: Actinolema; Fenzl

Species
- See text.

= Actinolema =

Genus of flowering plants

Actinolema is a genus of plants in the family Apiaceae. They are found in Southwest Asia and the Caucasus.

Two species are recognised:

- Actinolema eryngioides Fenzl
- Actinolema macrolema Boiss.
