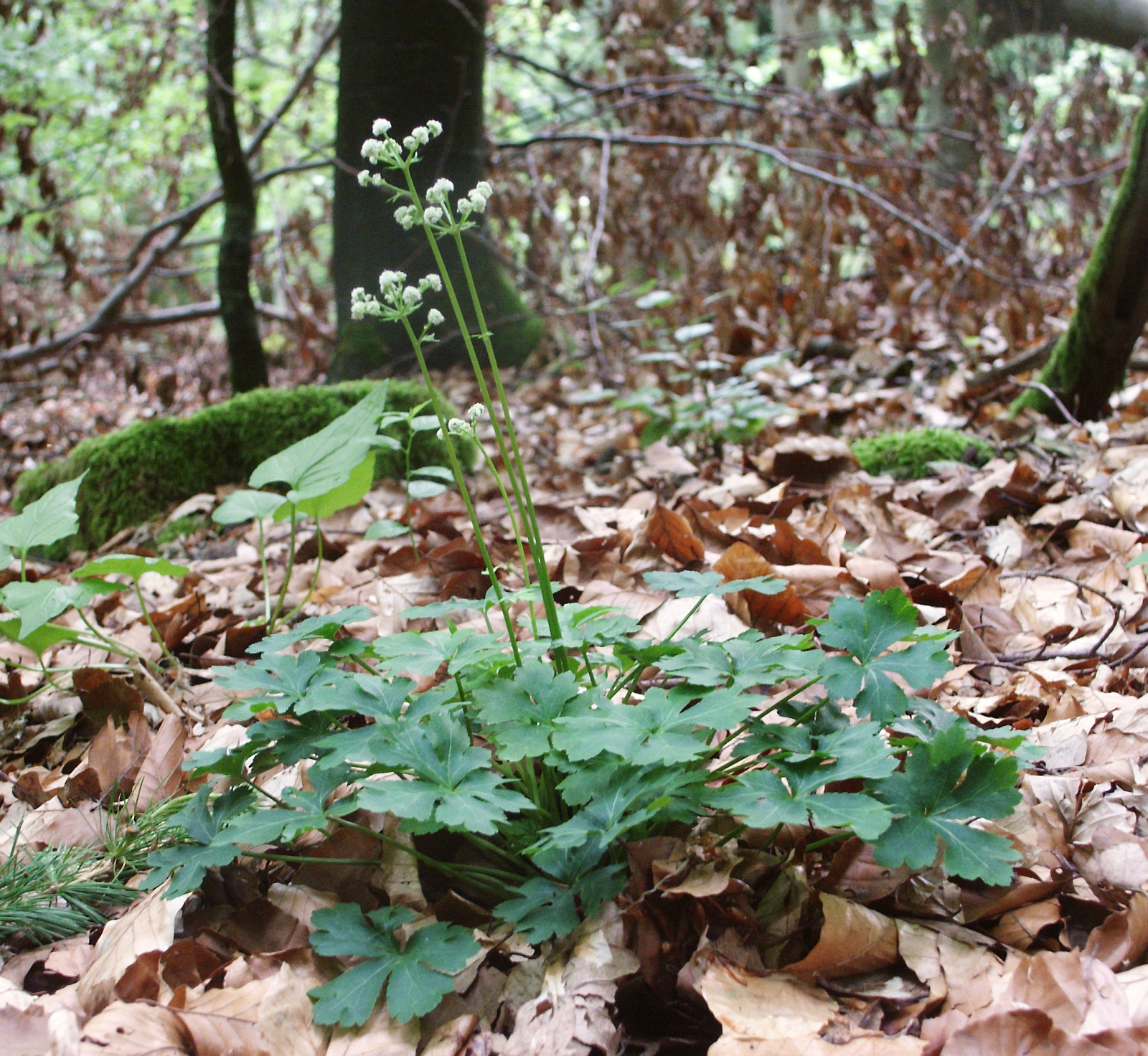
- Sanicula europaea

Scientific classification
- Kingdom: Plantae
- Clade: Tracheophytes
- Clade: Angiosperms
- Clade: Eudicots
- Clade: Asterids
- Order: Apiales
- Family: Apiaceae
- Subfamily: Saniculoideae; Burnett

Tribes
- Saniculeae; Steganotaenieae

= Saniculoideae =

Subfamily of plants

Saniculoideae is a subfamily of plants containing genera including Sanicula, Astrantia, and Eryngium. It has a bipolar distribution but is better represented in the Southern Hemisphere.

== Tribes and genera ==
These are tribes and genera accepted by Wikispecies.

=== Tribes ===
- Saniculeae
- Steganotaenieae

=== Genera ===
- Actinolema
- Alepidea
- Arctopus
- Astrantia
- Eryngium
- Petagnaea
- Polemanniopsis
- Sanicula
- Steganotaenia
