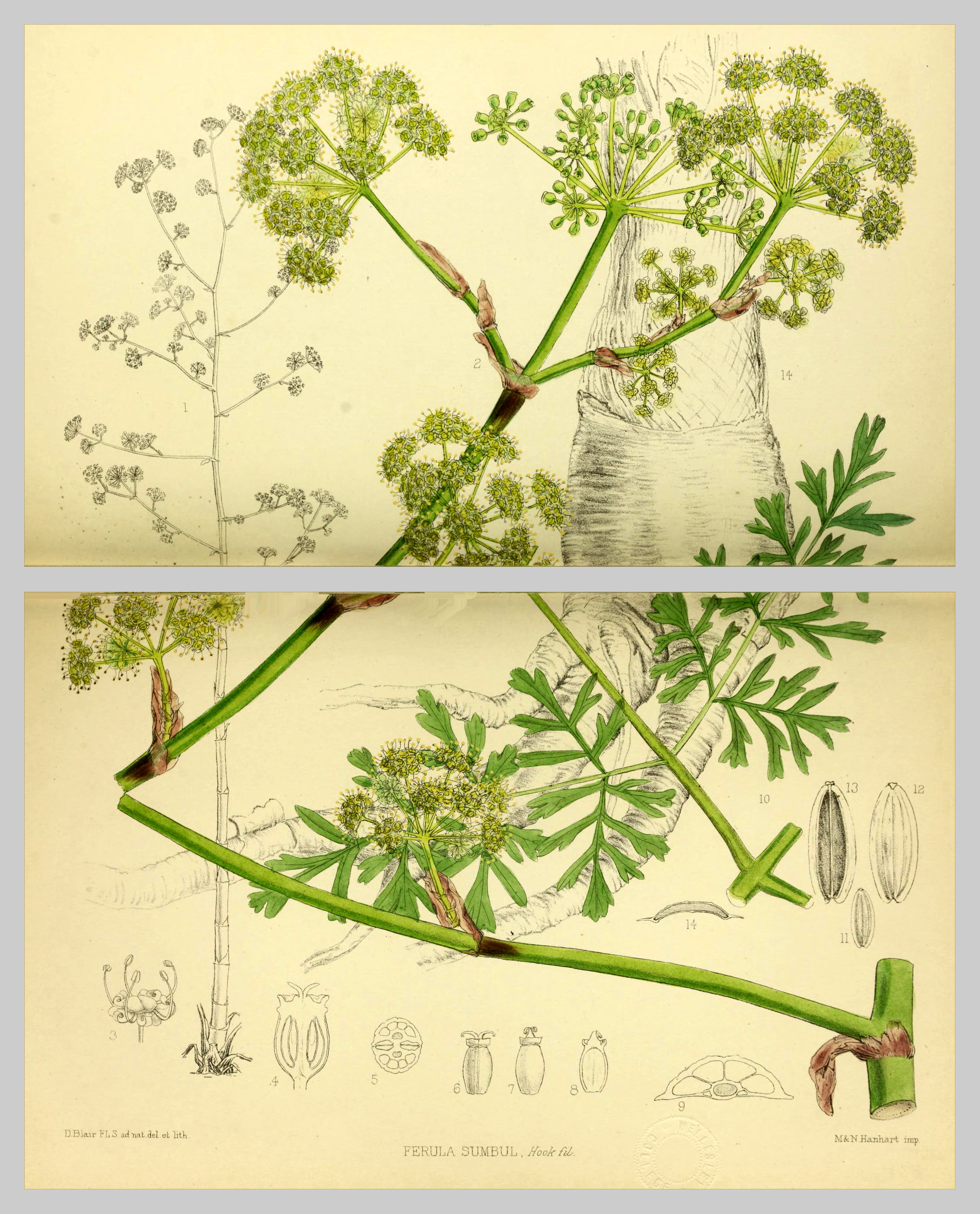
- Botanical illustration
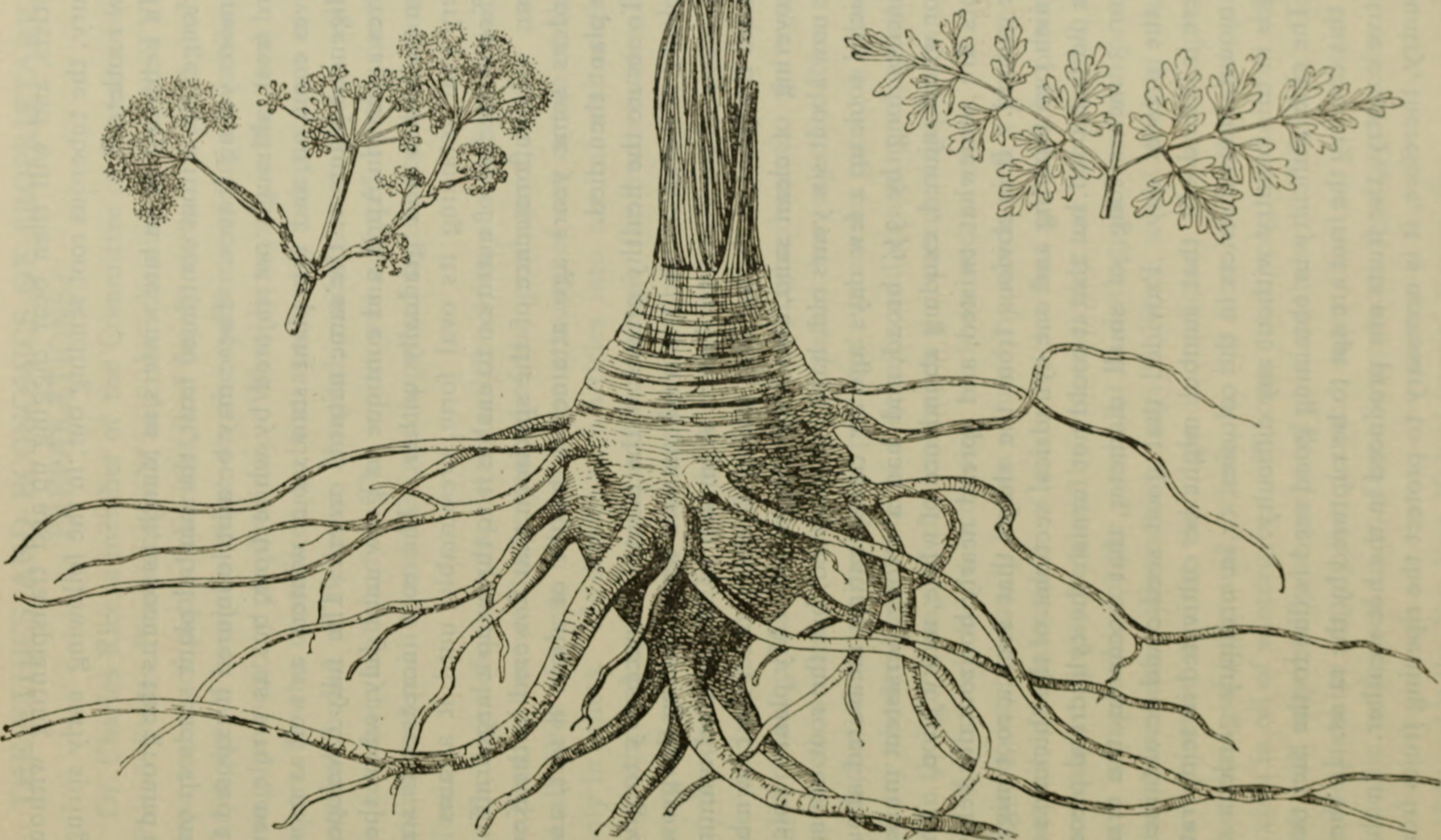
- Root

Scientific classification
- Kingdom: Plantae
- Clade: Tracheophytes
- Clade: Angiosperms
- Clade: Eudicots
- Clade: Asterids
- Order: Apiales
- Family: Apiaceae
- Genus: Ferula
- Species: F. moschata

Binomial name
- Ferula moschata (H.Reinsch) Koso-Pol.
- Distribution map of Ferula moschata, reproduced from the Red Book of Tajikistan

Synonyms
- List: Euryangium sumbul Kauffm.; Ferula sumbul (Kauffm.) Hook.f.; Ferula urceolata Korovin; Peucedanum sumbul (Kauffm.) Baill.; Sumbulus moschatus H.Reinsch

= Ferula moschata =

Species of flowering plant

Ferula moschata (syn. Ferula sumbul), the musk root or sumbul, is a species of flowering plant in the family Apiaceae, found from Central Asia to western Xinjiang. Its roots are the source of muskroot, a substitute for animal musk in medicinal and perfumery applications.
