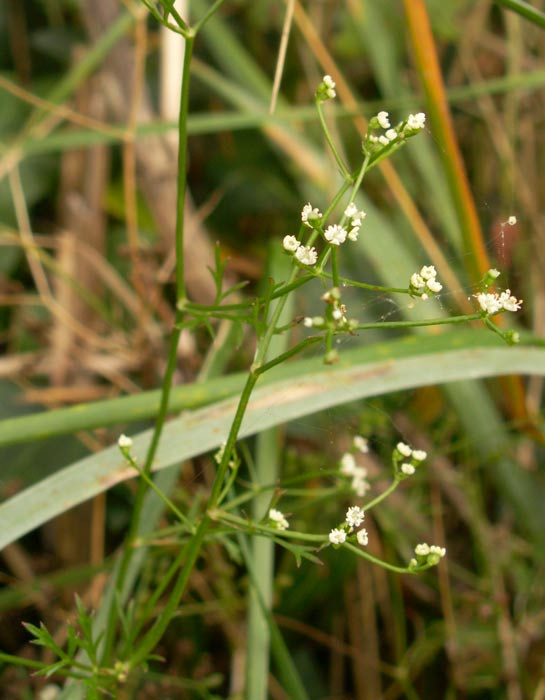
- Petroselinum segetum, France

Scientific classification
- Kingdom: Plantae
- Clade: Tracheophytes
- Clade: Angiosperms
- Clade: Eudicots
- Clade: Asterids
- Order: Apiales
- Family: Apiaceae
- Subfamily: Apioideae
- Tribe: Apieae
- Genus: Petroselinum; Hill

Species
- Petroselinum crispum – garden parsley; Petroselinum segetum – corn parsley

= Petroselinum =

Genus of flowering plants

Petroselinum is a genus of two parsley species of flowering plants in the family Apiaceae, native to western and southern Europe and northern Africa.

Plants of this genus are bright green, hairless, biennial and herbaceous; they are rarely annual plants. In the first year, they form a rosette of pinnate to tripinnate leaves and a tap root used as a food store over the winter. In the second year they grow a flowering stem up to 1 m tall with sparser leaves and umbels of white or pinkish to yellowish-green flowers.

== Taxonomy ==
The generic name comes from rendering the Greek word πετροσέλινον petrosélinon "rock-celery" into Latin, from πέτρα pétra "rock, stone" and σέλινον sélinon "celery". Mycenaean Greek se-ri-no, in Linear B, is the earliest attested form of the word sélinon.

== Species ==
The species of this genus are:

- Petroselinum crispum (garden parsley) from southern Europe and northern Africa (southern Italy, Greece, Algeria, Tunisia). It is an important culinary herb, widely used for flavouring and as a vegetable.
- Petroselinum segetum (corn parsley) from western Europe (Great Britain and the Netherlands south through France to Italy, Spain and Portugal). It is edible with a similar flavour like garden parsley, but it is not widely cultivated. It occurs in grassland, hedgerows, and river banks. In Great Britain, it is confined to lowland regions in southern and central England and southern Wales, and is scarce and declining due to agricultural intensification. It has narrower, more lanceolate leaves than garden parsley, only single pinnate, not tripinnate.

Plants of the World Online recognizes only P. crispum as species in this genus. P. segetum is instead recognized as a member of the genus Sison, and a synonym of Sison segetum.
