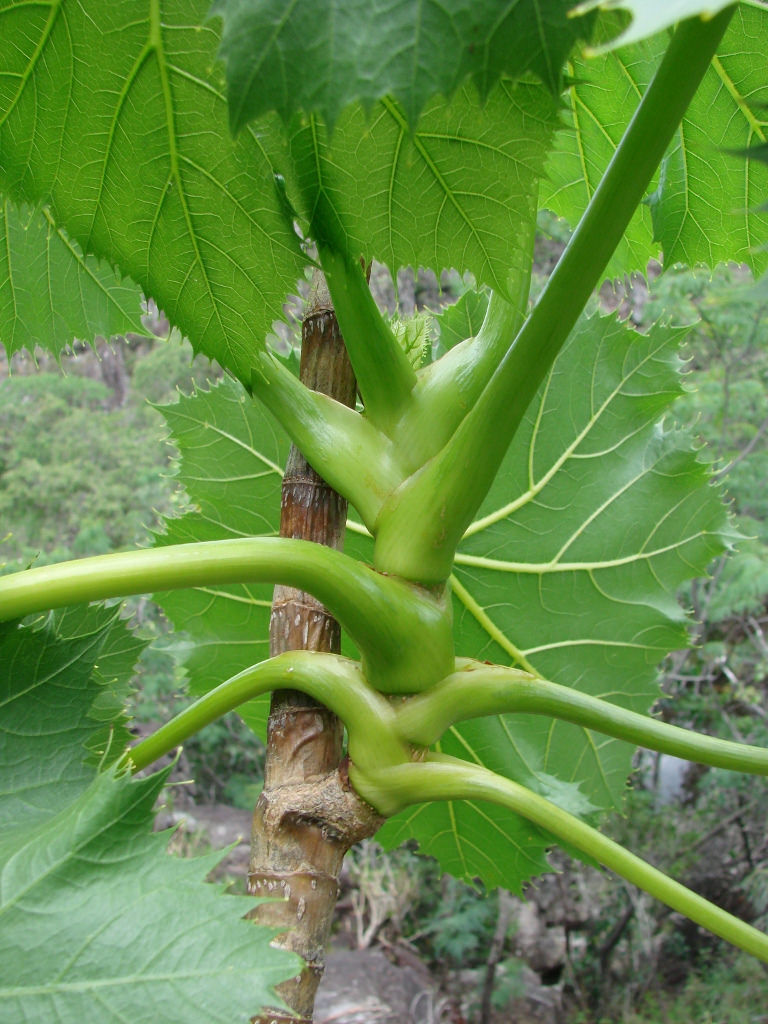
- Klotzschia glaziovii

Scientific classification
- Kingdom: Plantae
- Clade: Tracheophytes
- Clade: Angiosperms
- Clade: Eudicots
- Clade: Asterids
- Order: Apiales
- Family: Apiaceae
- Genus: Klotzschia; Cham.

= Klotzschia =

Genus of plants

Klotzschia is a genus of flowering plants belonging to the family Apiaceae. It is native to Brazil.

== Taxonomy ==
The genus was first described by Adelbert von Chamisso in 1833. The name Klotzschia is in honour of Johann Friedrich Klotzsch (1805–1860), a German pharmacist and botanist.

A 2021 molecular phylogenetic study suggested that it does not belong to any of the four subfamilies into which the family Apiaceae is divided. It has been suggested that it could be placed in a subfamily of its own.

=== Species ===
According to Plants of the World Online:

- Klotzschia brasiliensis Cham.
- Klotzschia glaziovii Urb.
- Klotzschia rhizophylla Urb.

== Gallery ==
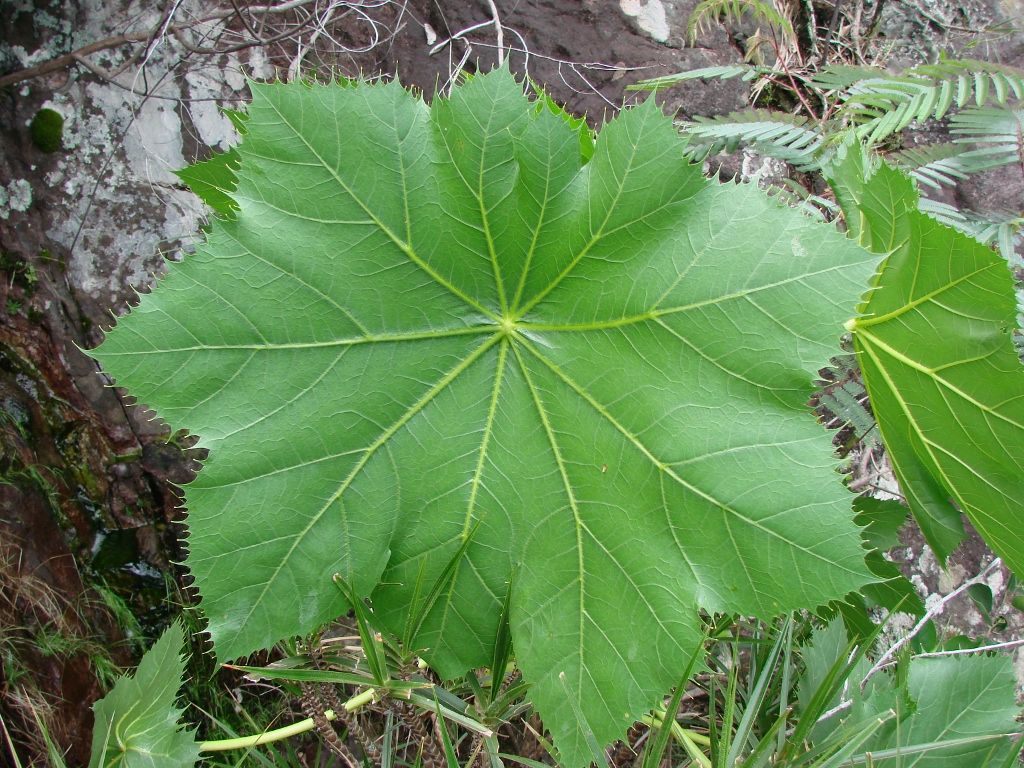
Attractive peltate foliage
