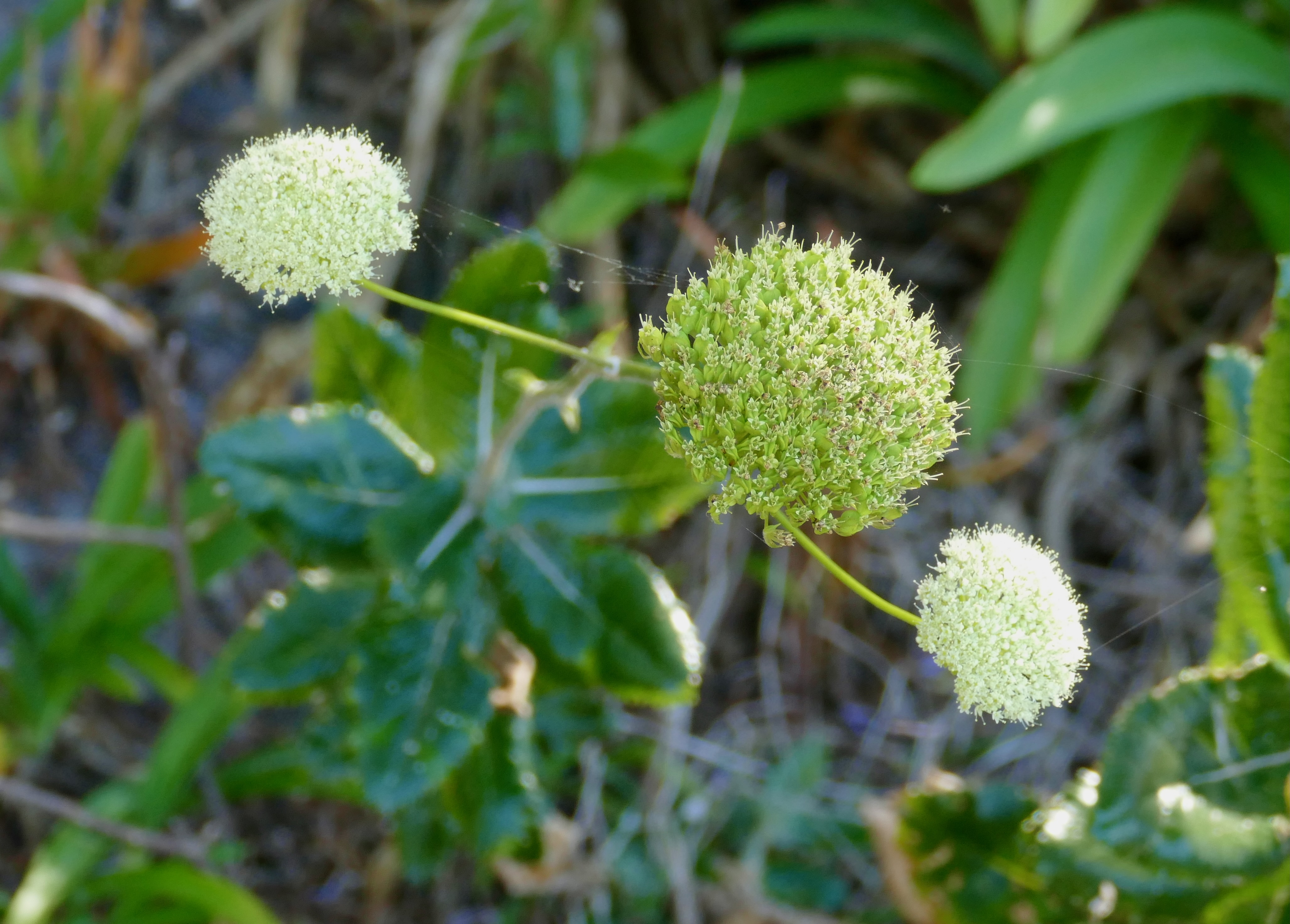
- Hermas villosa

Scientific classification
- Kingdom: Plantae
- Clade: Tracheophytes
- Clade: Angiosperms
- Clade: Eudicots
- Clade: Asterids
- Order: Apiales
- Family: Apiaceae
- Genus: Hermas; L.

Species
- See text

= Hermas (plant) =

Genus of plants

Hermas is a genus of flowering plant in the family Apiaceae, native to Cape Provinces of South Africa.

== Taxonomy ==
The genus was first described by Carl Linnaeus in 1771. A 2021 molecular phylogenetic study found that it did not belong to any of the four subfamilies of the Apiaceae, and suggested that it could be placed in a subfamily of its own.

=== Species ===
As of November 2022, Plants of the World Online accepted the following species:

- Hermas capitata L.f.
- Hermas ciliata L.f.
- Hermas gigantea L.f.
- Hermas intermedia C.Norman
- Hermas lanata (Hill) Magee
- Hermas proterantha B.J.de Villiers
- Hermas quercifolia Eckl. & Zeyh.
- Hermas quinquedentata L.f.
- Hermas villosa (L.) Thunb.
