= Trideca-7,9,11-trienoic acid =

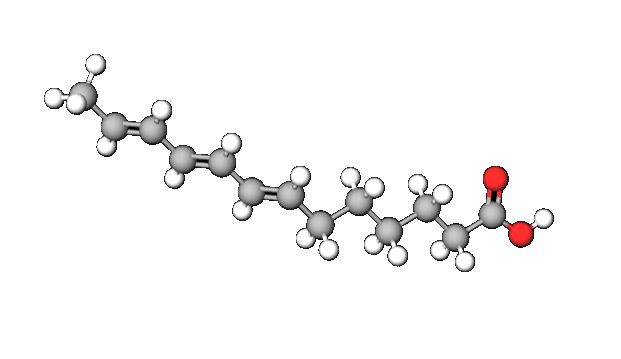

Names
- IUPAC name (7E,9E,11E)-Trideca-7,9,11-trienoic acid

Identifiers
3D model (JSmol)	Interactive image
ChemSpider	28288114
PubChem CID	88499374
- InChI: InChI=1S/C13H20O2/c1-2-3-4-5-6-7-8-9-10-11-12-13(14)15/h2-7H,8-12H2,1H3,(H,14,15)/b3-2+,5-4+,7-6+¨ Key: CMKVWQNTXKWDNT-ICDJNDDTSA-N
- SMILES: C/C=C/C=C/C=C/CCCCCC(=O)O

Properties
Chemical formula	C_{13}H_{20}O_{2}
Molar mass	208.301 g·mol^{−1}
- Except where otherwise noted, data are given for materials in their standard state (at 25 °C [77 °F], 100 kPa). Infobox references

Trideca-7,9,11-trienoic acid, or (7E,9E,11E)-trideca-7,9,11-trienoic acid, is an polyunsaturated fatty acid. It is present in Aethusa cynapium.

== Pharmacology ==
Trideca-7,9,11-trienoic acid has been shown to have an antianxiety effect in Mus musculus, Rattus norvegicus, and Homo sapiens. It reduces hypolocomotion caused by anxiety, which was psychopharmacologically induced with mCPP, in Mus musculus and Rattus norvegicus. A 2 mg/kg dose of diazepam has a very similar effect to 20 mg/kg of trideca-7,9,11-trienoic acid. This may suggest that trideca-7,9,11-trienoic acid is also a GABA agonist like diazepam.

== Extraction from A. cynapium ==
Trideca-7,9,11-trienoic acid can be extracted from dried aerial parts of A. cynapium with methanol, followed by chloroform, followed by column chromatography with DCM and methanol (40:60), followed by flash chromatography with DCM and methanol (92.5:7.5), followed by preparative TLC.

== Uses ==
In addition to its potential as an anxiolytic, trideca-7,9,11-trienoic acid has also been studied for use in inks and protective coatings.
