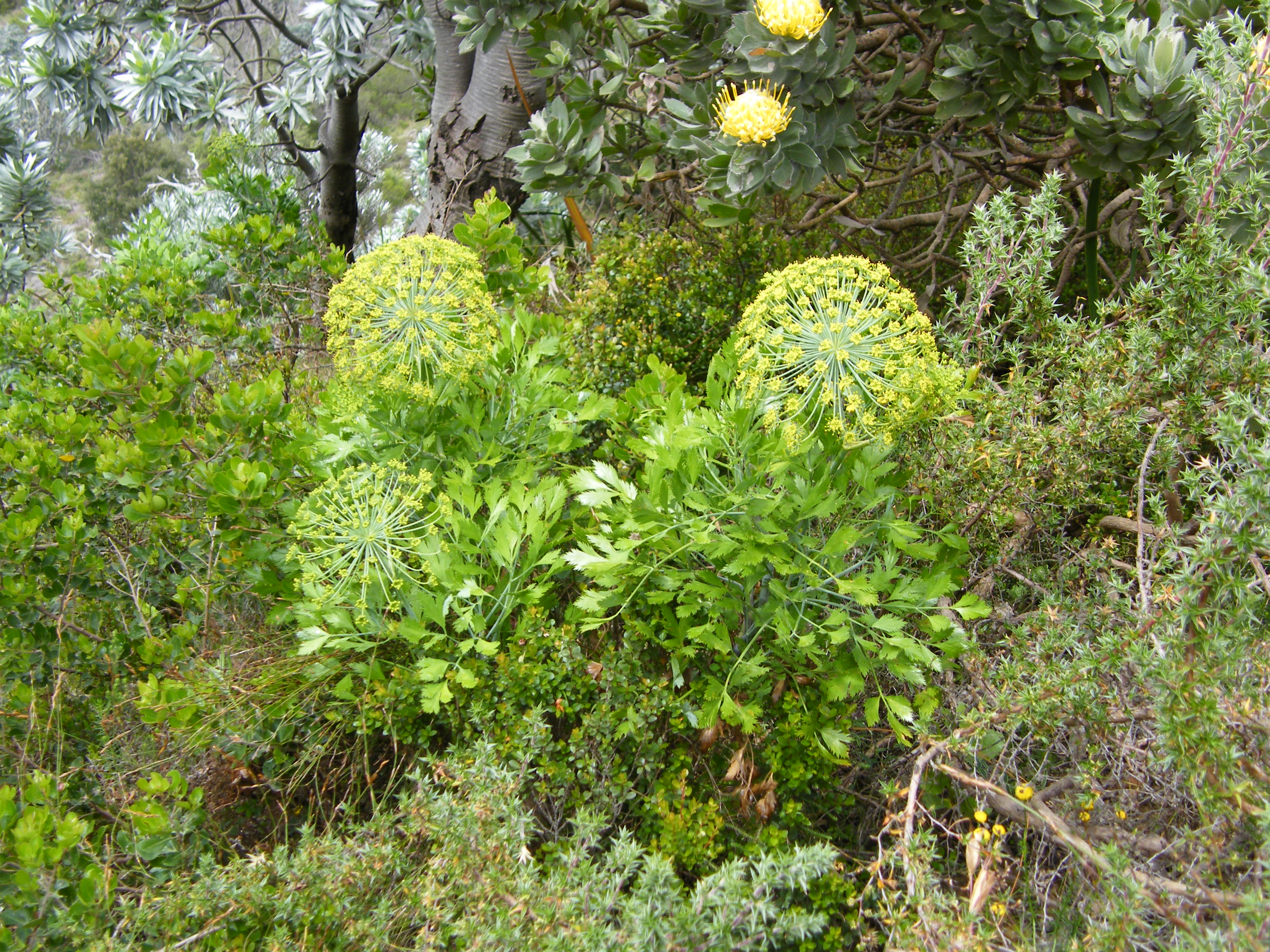

Scientific classification
- Kingdom: Plantae
- Clade: Tracheophytes
- Clade: Angiosperms
- Clade: Eudicots
- Clade: Asterids
- Order: Apiales
- Family: Apiaceae
- Genus: Notobubon
- Species: N. galbanum

Binomial name
- Notobubon galbanum (L.) Magee

Synonyms
- Agasyllis galbanum (L.) Spreng.; Bubon galbaniferum Hill nom. illeg.; Bubon galbanum L.; Galbanon officinale Raf.; Oreoselinum galbaniferum Garsault nom. inval.; Peucedanum galbanum (L.) Benth. & Hook. f.; Peucedanum galbanum (L.) Drude; Selinum galbanum (L.) Spreng.

= Notobubon galbanum =

Species of flowering plant

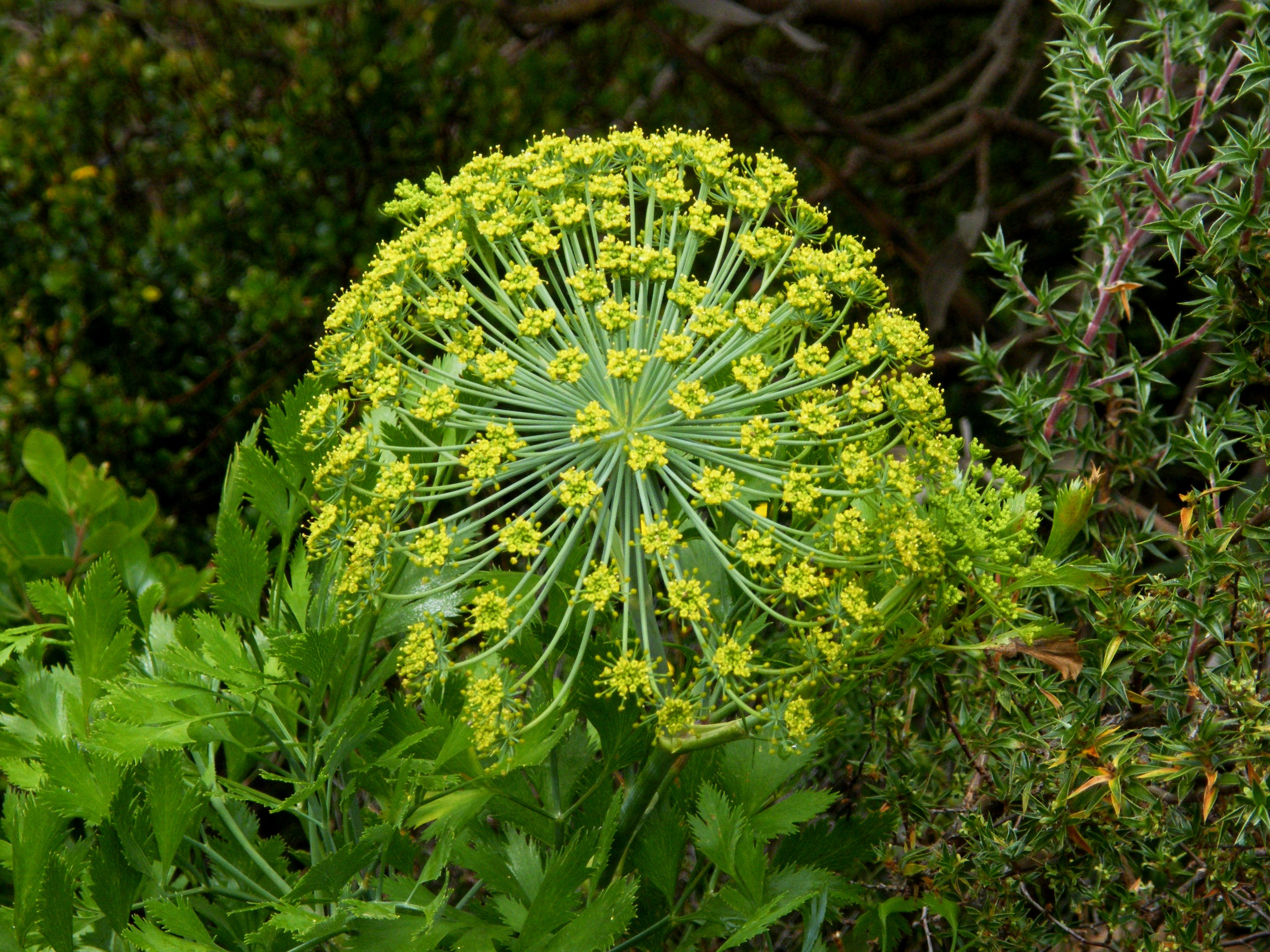
Notobubon galbanum or blister bush umbel

Notobubon galbanum, re-classified from Peucedanum galbanum in 2008, commonly called the blister bush or hog's fennel, is a South African plant that is best known for its ability to cause painful blistering after contact. In Afrikaans this plant species is known as bergseldery (i.e., "mountain celery").

The plant is in the family Apiaceae, subfamily Apioideae. Although it is in the same family as edible plants such as the carrot and herbs such as fennel and dill, it is not edible and touching it can cause severe blistering particularly if the irritant chemicals are exposed to sunlight (phytophotodermatitis).

== Appearance ==
The blister bush's leaves look like flat-leaved parsley or celery. The mildly glaucous, evergreen foliage is arranged around the heads of the plant's upright branches. Typically a small shrub, the blister bush can reach a maximum height of around 2.5 metres. The flower head has a very green and slightly yellow appearance and is made up of many tiny yellow flowers that occur in large green compound umbels from October to February. The umbel gives off flat winged seeds.

== Distribution and habitat ==
The blister bush is native to the Table Mountain and western Cape Fold Belt region of the Western Cape in South Africa. It is usually found at medium- to high-altitudes in partially shady and damp areas but will also grow at lower altitudes and in areas of direct sunshine. The plant grows in the winter rainfall areas, which are relatively frost-free and have well-drained soils.

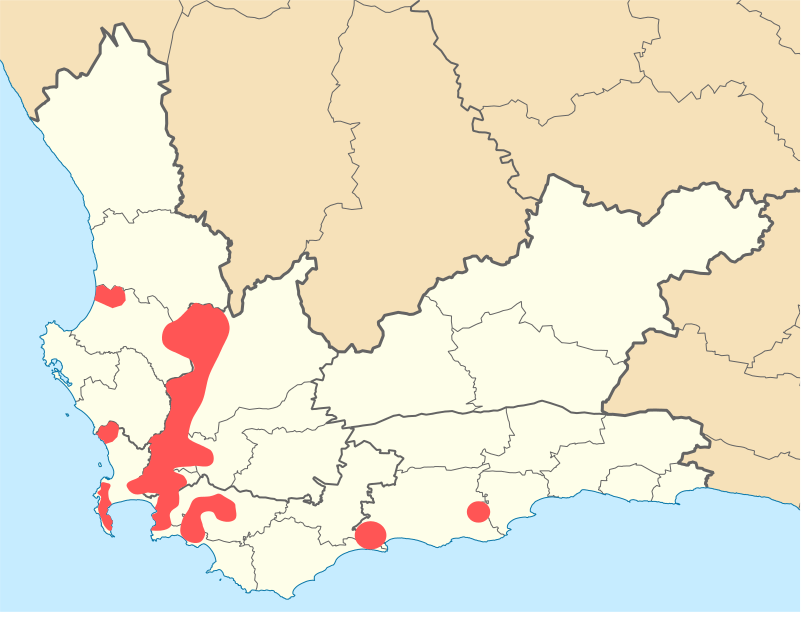
Distribution of Notobubon galbanum across the Western Cape, South Africa.

== Effects on the body ==
The surface of the plant is covered in a mix of chemicals including psoralen, xanthotoxin and bergapten that causes a phototoxic reaction resulting in blistering two or three days after exposure. The moment of exposure is innocuous, without any untoward sensations to the unwary. Exposure of the affected skin to ultraviolet light, such as contained in sunlight, triggers the effects of the plant's toxins, leading to severe itching and blistering. The welts and resulting blisters can be as small as the size of a coin to covering as much exposed skin as came into contact with the plant. Where more than 5% of the body is afflicted, the scarring can be a serious matter. Washing the affected area immediately after exposure may help but preventing any further exposure to ultraviolet light such as the sun or many artificial light sources will reduce and /or eliminate blistering.

=== Treatment ===
Preventing the blister from forming is the best way to deal with the affliction. Apart from covering the area and preventing any exposure to sunlight, it is useful to directly apply sunscreen lotion as well. Reapply the lotion as soon as the itching starts again. While the red itchy welt is best treated before the blister appears, all is not lost if you are late. Direct application of the spray-on types of sunscreen, particularly those high in alcohol, tends to both dry the welt and reduce the irritation with immediate effect. If sunscreen is applied soon enough, the process can be interrupted in its entirety.

If untreated the welt should stop itching and weeping after the first five to seven days. Once this has happened, it should be left exposed to allow the affected area to breathe. Blisters sometimes subside into a tender scab or scar that can take many months to disappear altogether.

=== Medicinal uses ===
Surprisingly, considering its toxicity, it has been credited with a range of medicinal properties. In the traditional medicine of the indigenous peoples of the Cape, it has been recorded as a diuretic and as a treatment for rheumatism, gout, bladder ailments, water retention and high blood pressure. The medicinal application of the plant's foliage took the form of an infusion.

== Cultivation ==
Though undeniably an attractive garden subject, this fynbos plant is rarely propagated on account of its phototoxic foliage. When cultivated, it prefers a relatively sunny position, but tolerates a mildly shady or moist spot provided that this is coupled with well-drained soil. For obvious reasons, a location should be chosen where it will not be likely to come in contact with human skin.

== Other references ==
- Germishuizen, G. & Meyer, N.L. (eds). 2003. Plants of southern Africa : an annotated checklist. Strelitzia 14. National Botanical Institute, Pretoria.
- Goldblatt, P. & Manning, J. 2000. Cape plants. A conspectus of the Cape flora of South Africa. Strelitzia 9. National Botanical Institute, Cape Town and Missouri Botanical Garden.
