= Haloselinum =

Scientific classification
- Kingdom: Plantae
- Clade: Tracheophytes
- Clade: Angiosperms
- Clade: Eudicots
- Clade: Asterids
- Order: Apiales
- Family: Apiaceae
- Subfamily: Apioideae
- Tribe: Selineae
- Genus: Haloselinum; Pimenov
- Species: H. falcaria

Binomial name
- Haloselinum falcaria (Turcz.) Pimenov

Synonyms
- Peucedanum falcaria Turcz. (1832); Peucedanum pricei N.D.Simpson; Peucedanum salsugineum Krylov

Genus of flowering plants

Haloselinum is a genus of flowering plants in the family Apiaceae. It contains a single species, Haloselinum falcaria, a perennial native to central Asia. It ranges from Kazakhstan to southwestern Siberia (Altai Krai, Altai Republic, and Tuva), Xinjiang, Mongolia, and Inner Mongolia.
