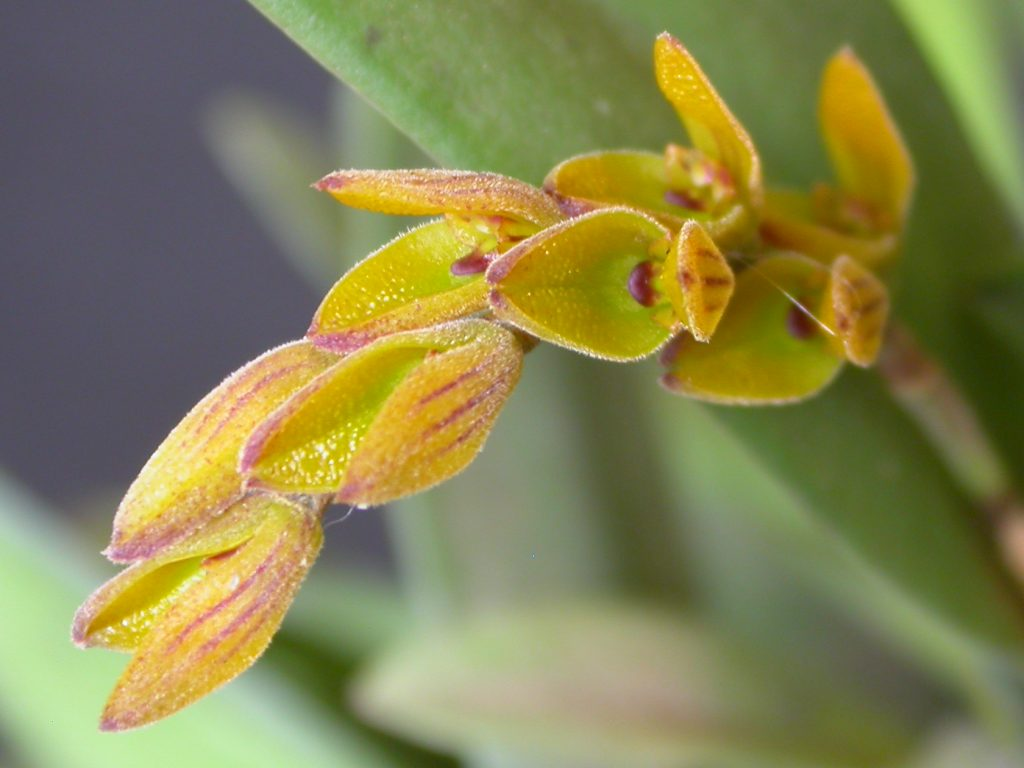

Scientific classification
- Kingdom: Plantae
- Clade: Tracheophytes
- Clade: Angiosperms
- Clade: Monocots
- Order: Asparagales
- Family: Orchidaceae
- Subfamily: Epidendroideae
- Genus: Acianthera
- Species: A. klotzschiana

Binomial name
- Acianthera klotzschiana (Rchb.f.) Pridgeon & M.W. Chase (2001)

Synonyms
- Pleurothallis klotzschiana Rchb.f. (1850) (Basionym); Humboldtia klotzschiana (Rchb.f.) Kuntze (1891)

= Acianthera klotzschiana =

Species of orchid

Acianthera klotzschiana is a species of orchid.
