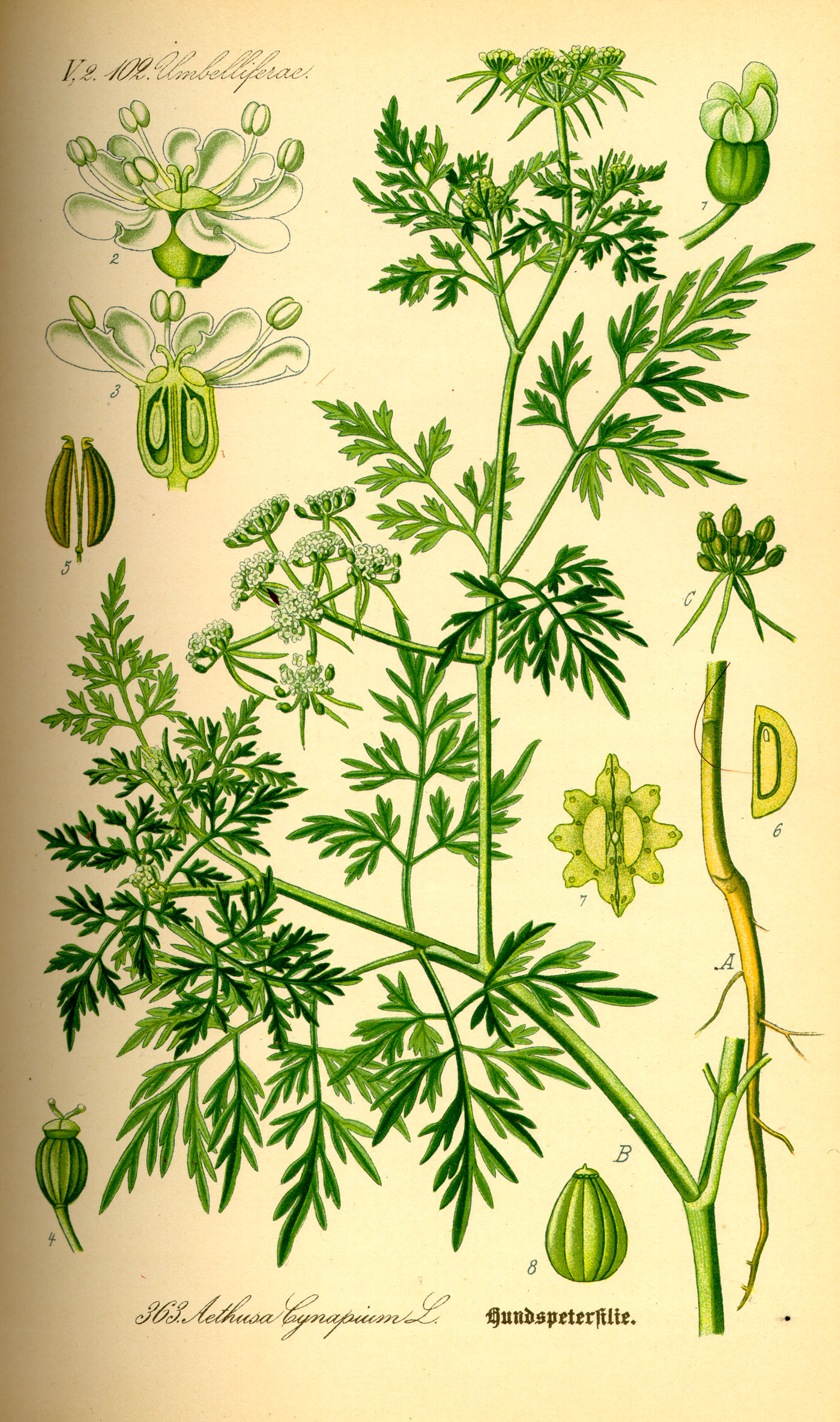

Scientific classification
- Kingdom: Plantae
- Clade: Tracheophytes
- Clade: Angiosperms
- Clade: Eudicots
- Clade: Asterids
- Order: Apiales
- Family: Apiaceae
- Subfamily: Apioideae
- Tribe: Selineae
- Genus: Aethusa
- Species: A. cynapium

Binomial name
- Aethusa cynapium L.

Subspecies
- A. c. subsp. cynapium; A. c. subsp. elata; A. c. subsp. segetalis

= Aethusa cynapium =

Species of flowering plant in the parsley family

Aethusa cynapium (fool's parsley, fool's cicely, or poison parsley) is an annual (rarely biennial) herb in the flowering plant family Apiaceae, native to Europe, western Asia, and northwest Africa. It is the only member of the genus Aethusa. It is related to hemlock and water-dropwort, and like them it is poisonous, though less so than hemlock. It has been introduced into many other parts of the world and is a common weed in cultivated ground.

== Description ==
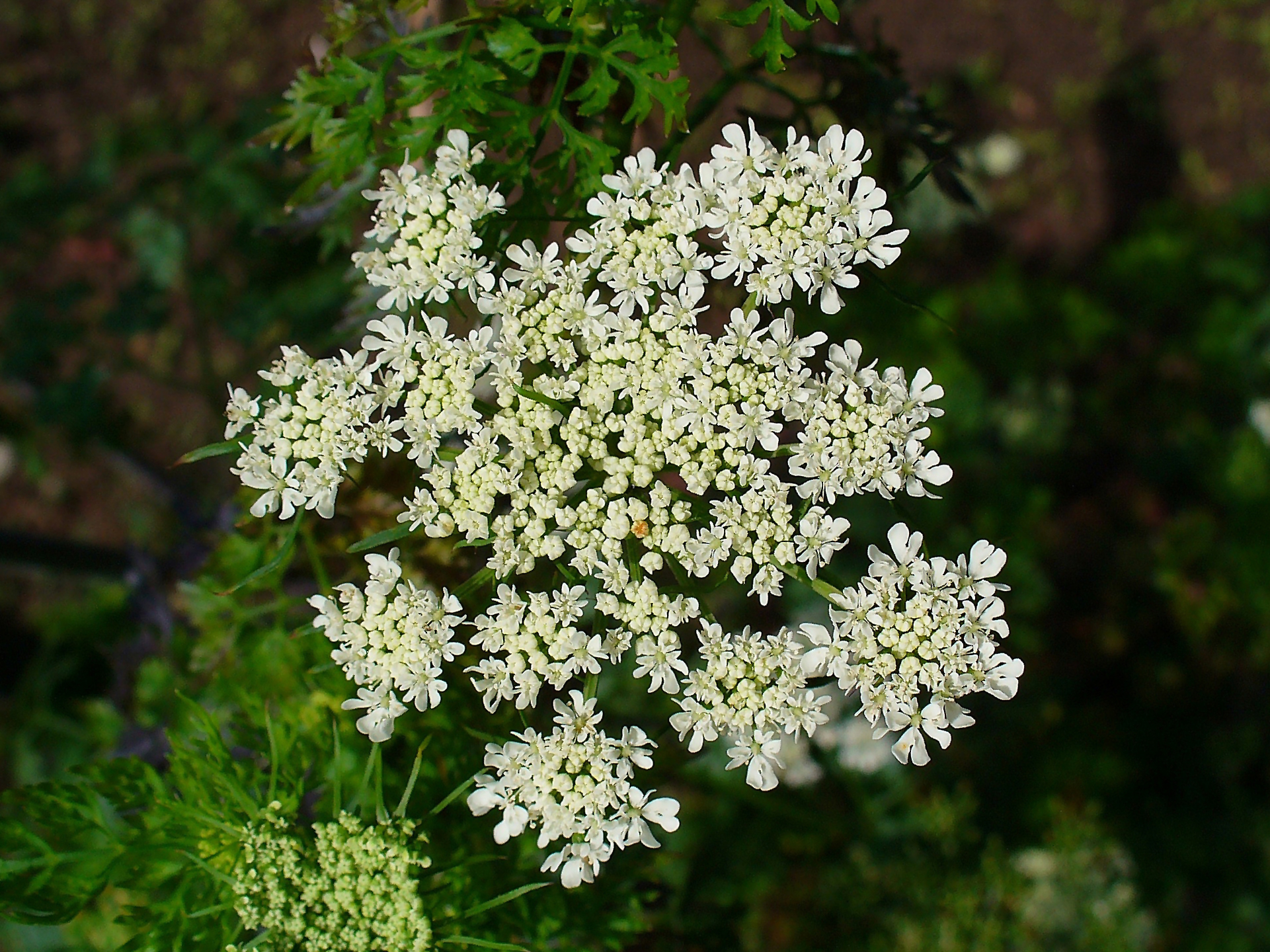
Inflorescence of fool's parsley

Aethusa cynapium has a fusiform root and a smooth hollow branched stem growing to about 80 cm (31 in) high, with much divided (ternately pinnate) smooth leaves with an unpleasant smell, and small compound umbels of small irregular white flowers.

== Taxonomy ==
Aethusa cynapium was given its accepted scientific name by Carl Linnaeus in 1753. It is the sole species in the genus Aethusa which is part of the family Apiaceae.

It has three accepted subspecies according to Plants of the World Online:

- Aethusa cynapium subsp. cynapium
- Aethusa cynapium subsp. elata (Hoffm.) Schübl. & G.Martens
- Aethusa cynapium subsp. segetalis (Boenn.) Schübl. & G.Martens

=== Names ===
The common names for the species include fool's parsley, dog poison, dog's parsley, garden hemlock, and lesser hemlock.

== Chemical composition, toxicity and medical uses ==
A. cynapium is poisonous when fresh, but safe if dried. A. cynapium's toxic effects are caused at least in part by cynopine, which resembles coniine in its physical and chemical characters as well as physiological actions. The whole plant is toxic with this alkaloid. Toxins like cynopine are destroyed by drying. A. cynapium also contains trideca-7,9,11-trienoic acid, aethusin, aethusanol A, aethusanol B, as well as flavone glycosides such as rutoside, narcissine, and ascorbic acid.

The parts of A. cynapium that grow above the ground are sometimes used to make medicine. The plants has been used in traditional medicine to treat complaints in children, infantile cholera, summer diarrhea, convulsions, mental tension, sleep disorders, delirium, and as stomachic. A. cynapium has actually been shown to cause antianxiety effects in mice because it contains trideca-7,9,11-trienoic acid.

Poisoning from A. cynapium results in symptoms of heat in the mouth and throat. A post-mortem examination has shown redness of the membrane lining the gullet and windpipe, along with symptoms of slight congestion within the duodenum and stomach. Some toxins are destroyed by drying, and indeed, dried hay containing the plant is not poisonous at all.
