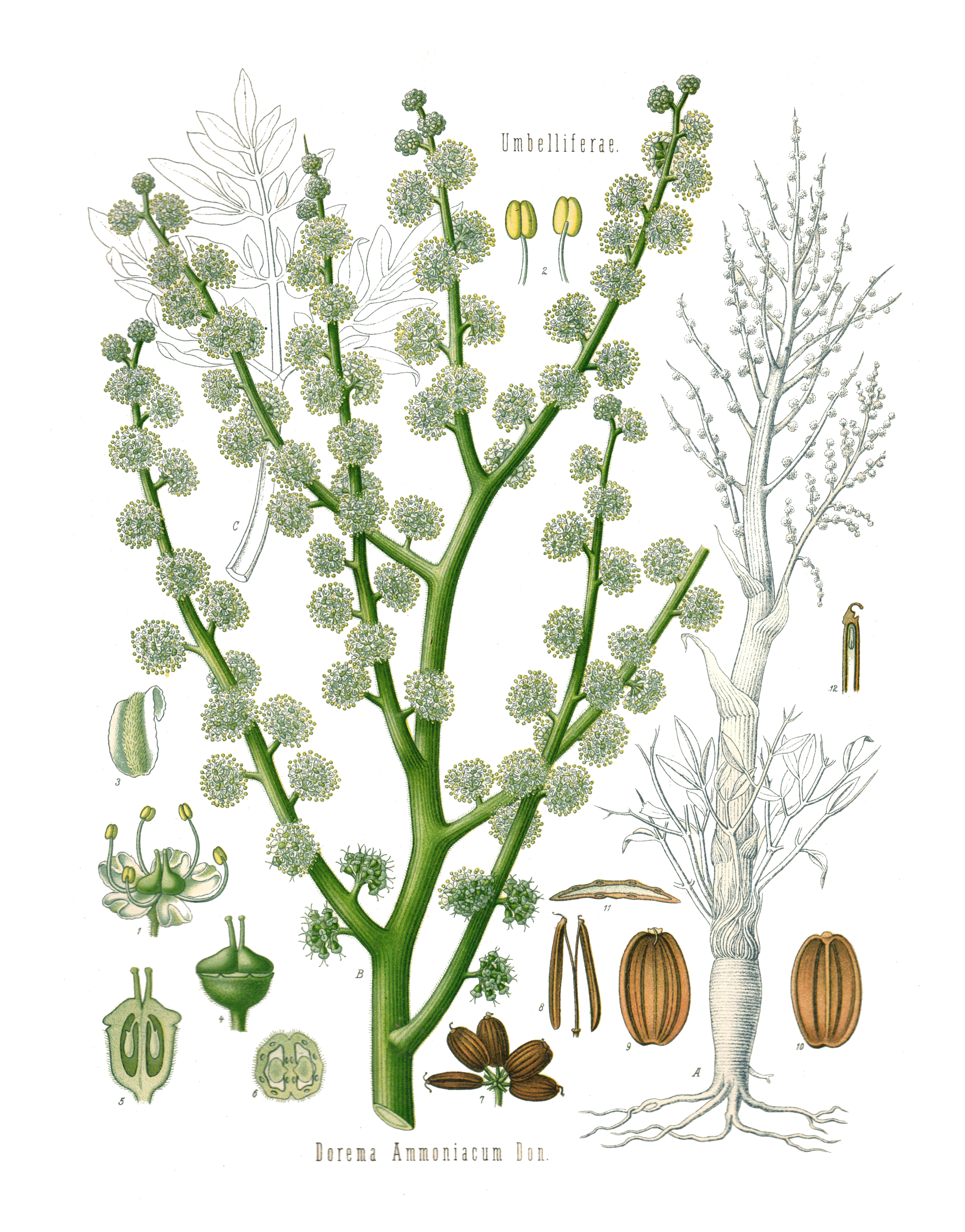
- Botanical illustration

Scientific classification
- Kingdom: Plantae
- Clade: Tracheophytes
- Clade: Angiosperms
- Clade: Eudicots
- Clade: Asterids
- Order: Apiales
- Family: Apiaceae
- Genus: Ferula
- Species: F. ammoniacum

Binomial name
- Ferula ammoniacum (D.Don) Spalik, M.Panahi, Piwczyński & Puchałka

Synonyms
- List: Diserneston gummiferum Jaub. & Spach; Dorema ammoniacum D.Don; Dorema gummiferum (Jaub. & Spach) K.M.Korol.; Ferula ammonifera Oken; Peucedanum ammoniacum (D.Don) Baill.

= Ferula ammoniacum =

Species of flowering plant

Ferula ammoniacum (syn. Dorema ammoniacum), also known as oshac or ussaq, is a species of flowering plant in the family Apiaceae, native to Iran, Turkmenistan, Afghanistan, and Pakistan. It is the source of Persian gum ammoniac.
