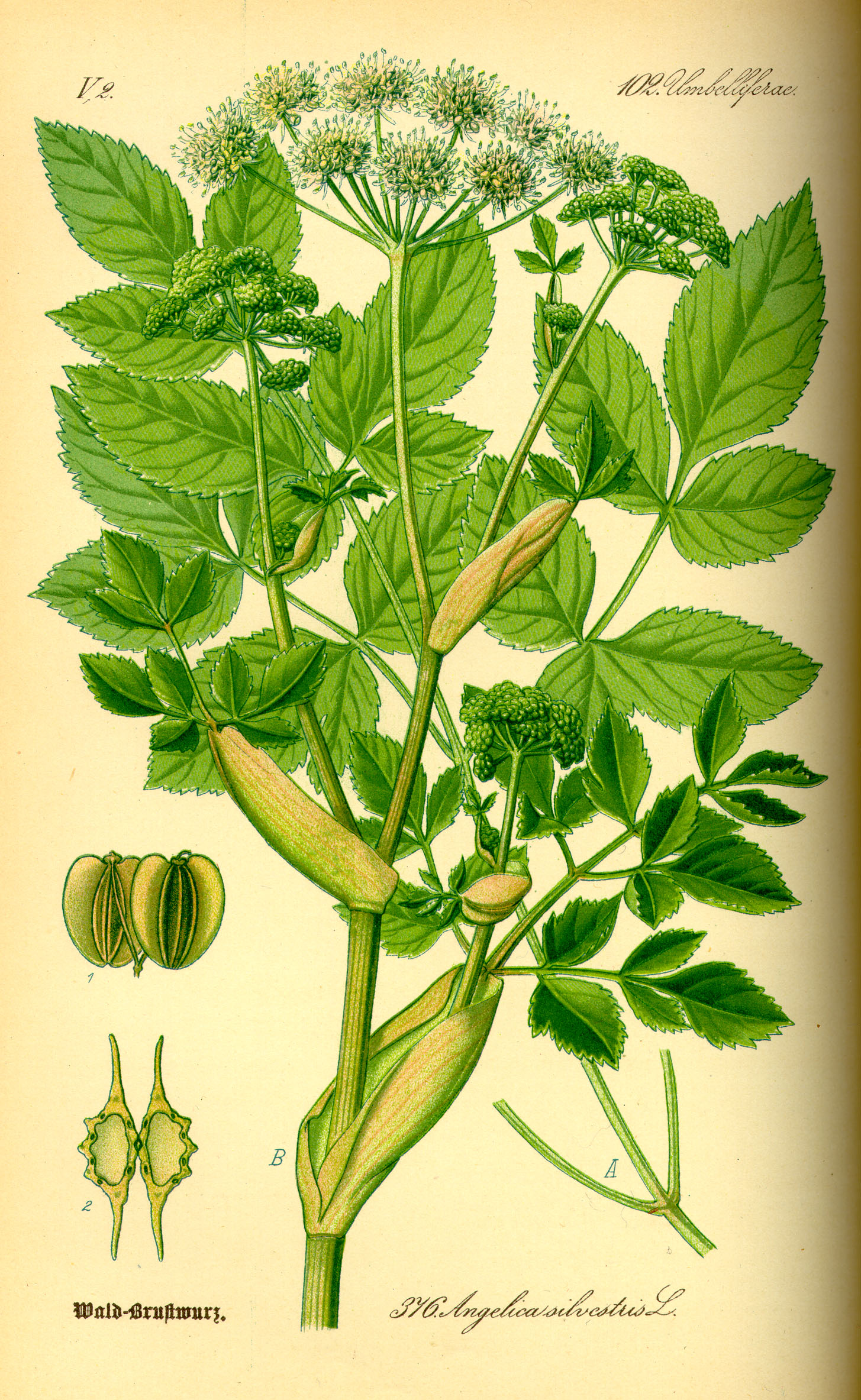

Conservation status
- Least Concern (IUCN 3.1)

- Secure (NatureServe)

Scientific classification
- Kingdom: Plantae
- Clade: Tracheophytes
- Clade: Angiosperms
- Clade: Eudicots
- Clade: Asterids
- Order: Apiales
- Family: Apiaceae
- Genus: Angelica
- Species: A. sylvestris

Binomial name
- Angelica sylvestris L.

= Angelica sylvestris =

Wild angelica

Species of flowering plant

Angelica sylvestris or wild angelica is a species of flowering plant, native to Europe and central Asia. An annual or short-lived perennial growing to a maximum of 2.5 m (8.2 ft), it has erect purplish stems and rounded umbels of minuscule white or pale pink flowers in late summer.

== Habitat and ecology ==
The Latin specific epithet sylvestris means "growing in woodland", but it tolerates a range of conditions, including fields, hedgerows, open woods, marshes, and fens. It grows in light (sandy), medium (loamy), and heavy (clay) soils.

It has recently been determined to be an invasive weed in New Brunswick and Cape Breton, Nova Scotia, Canada. "According to the New Brunswick Invasive Species Council, unless this species is controlled, woodland angelica could spread throughout Canada, overwhelming other vegetation." The flowers are visited by a wide array of insects, are thus characterised by a generalised pollination system.

Adult wasps of Dolichovespula norwegica are known to feed off the nectar provided by A. sylvestris.

== Cultivation and uses ==
A. sylvestris is cultivated in gardens. The cultivar 'Ebony', with pink flowers, has gained the Royal Horticultural Society's Award of Garden Merit.

The vegetable was eaten until the 20th century. The plant can be stored. The stem was eaten fresh, and the leaves could be boiled to a stew for storage or cooked with milk. The plant has also been used for dyeing.

== Gallery ==
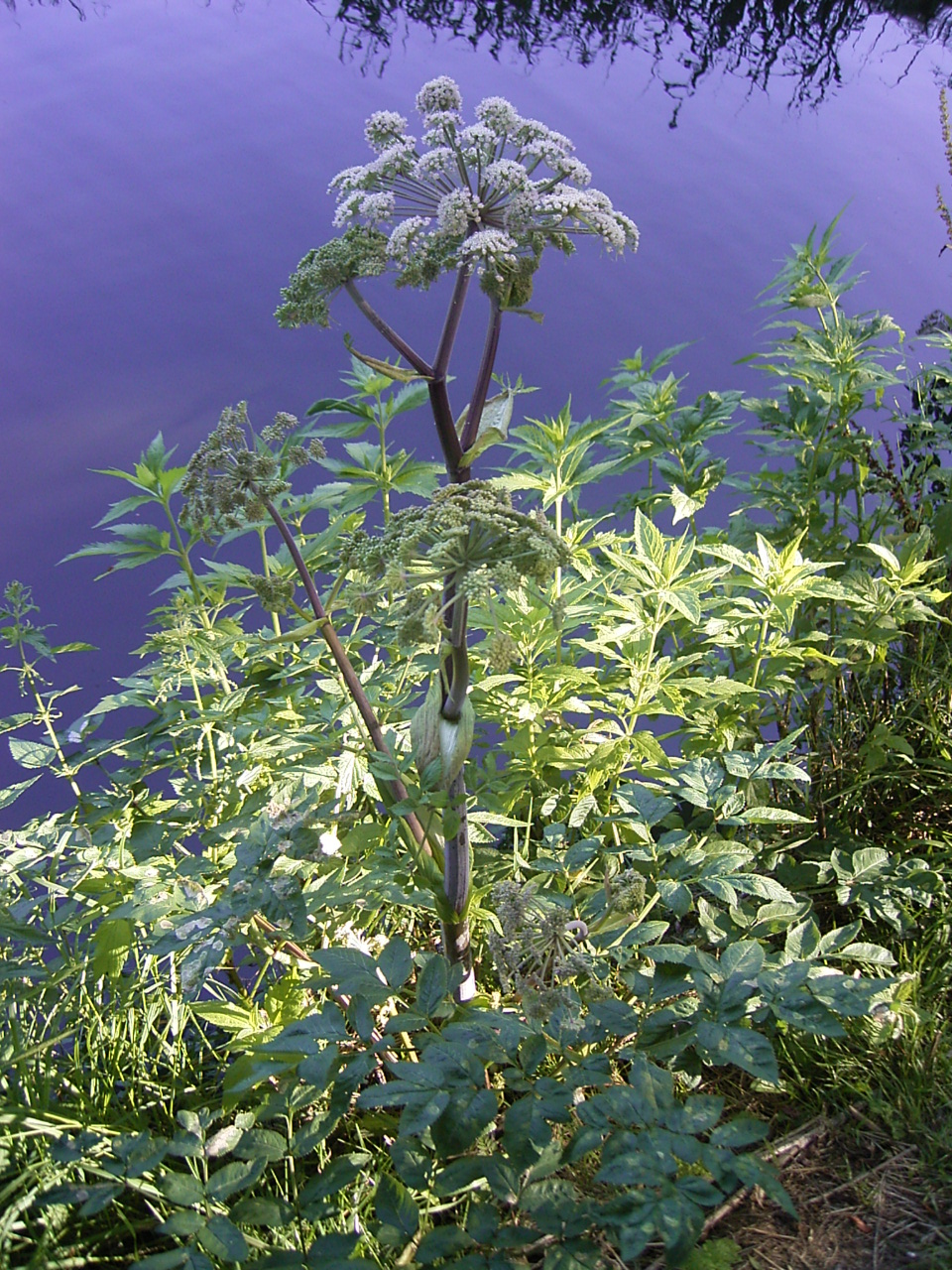
Entire plant

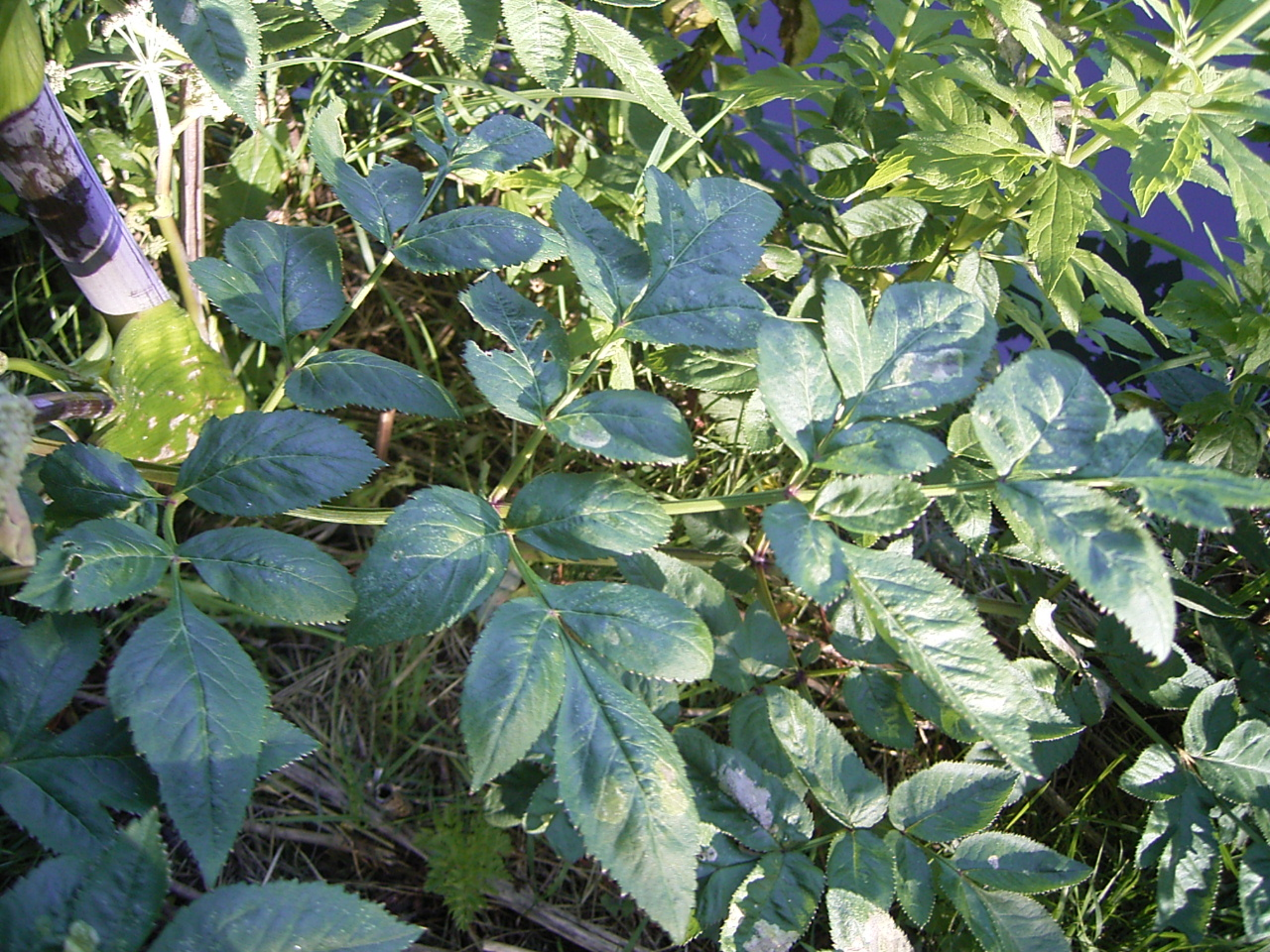
Lower leaf

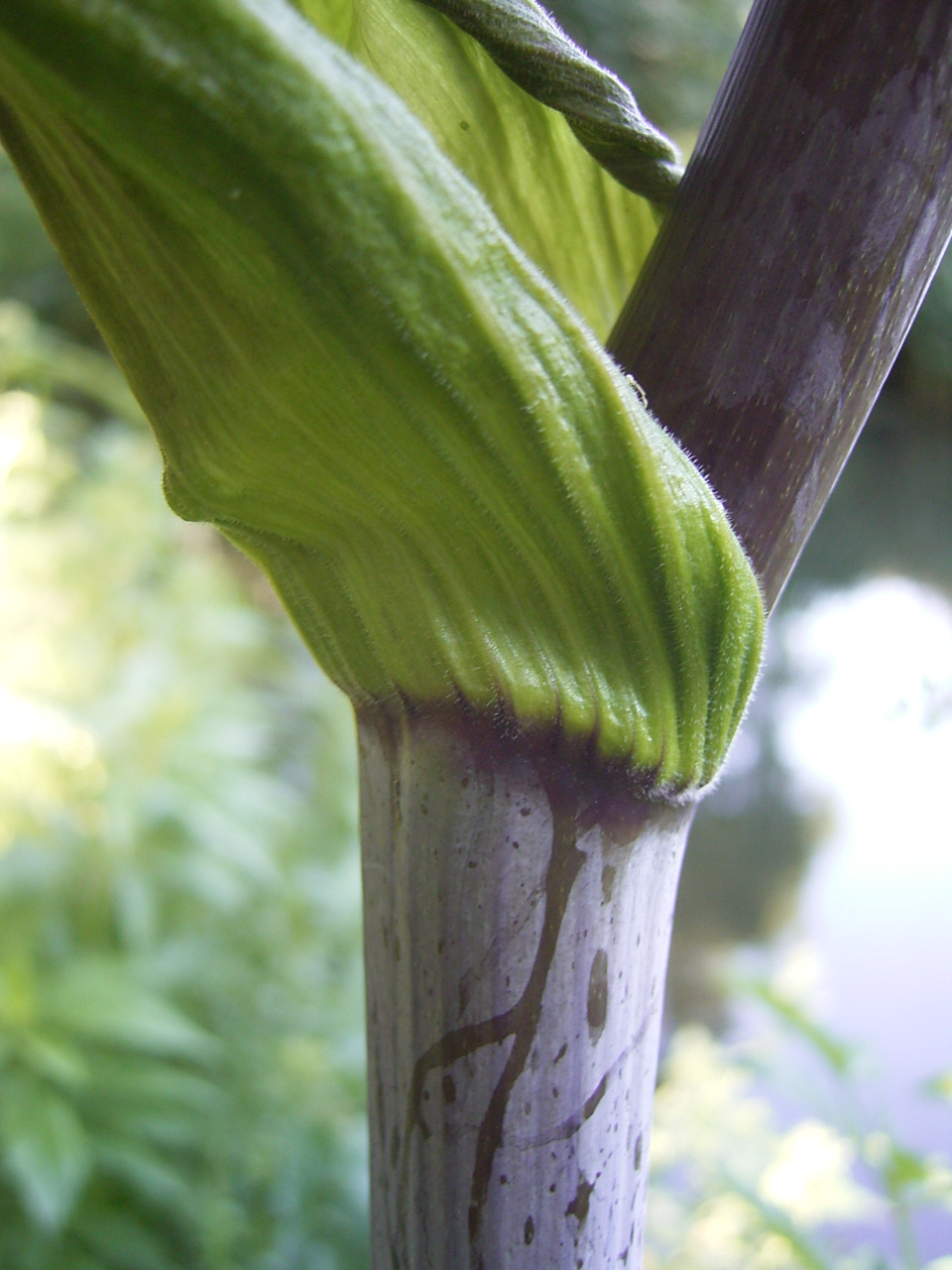
Leaf sheath on stem

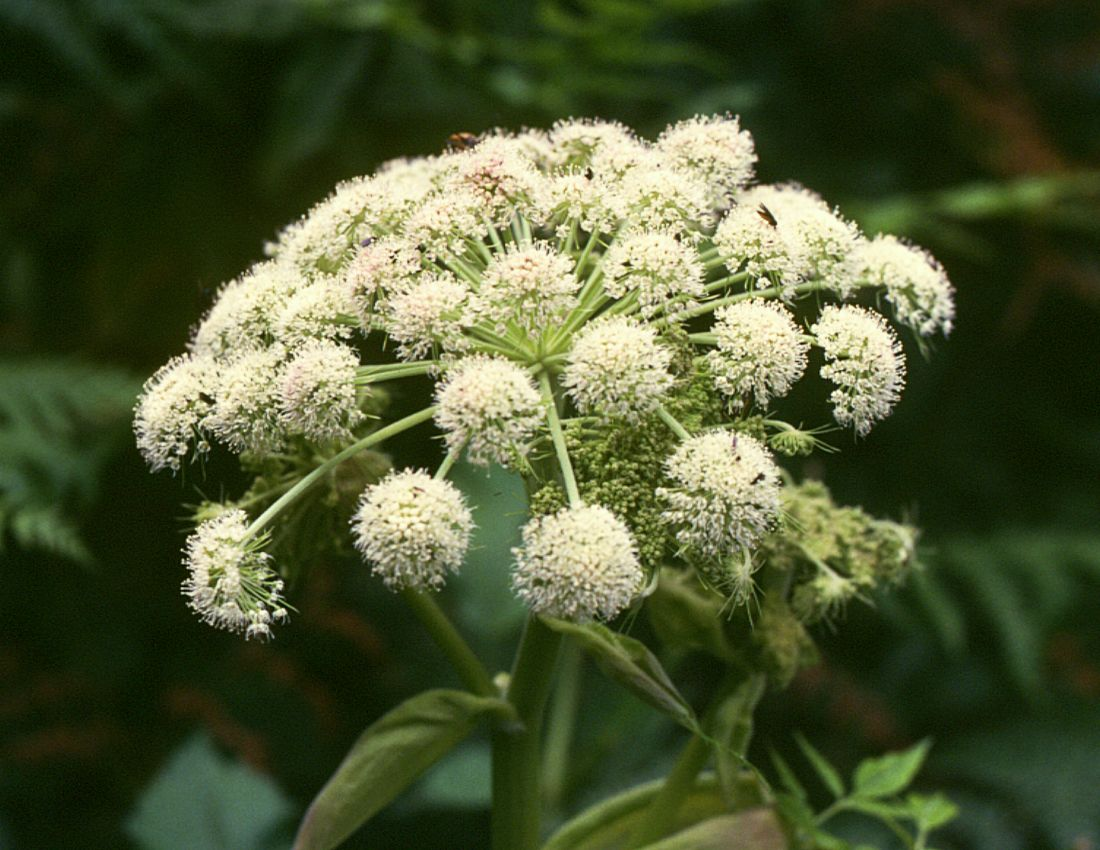
Flowering umbel

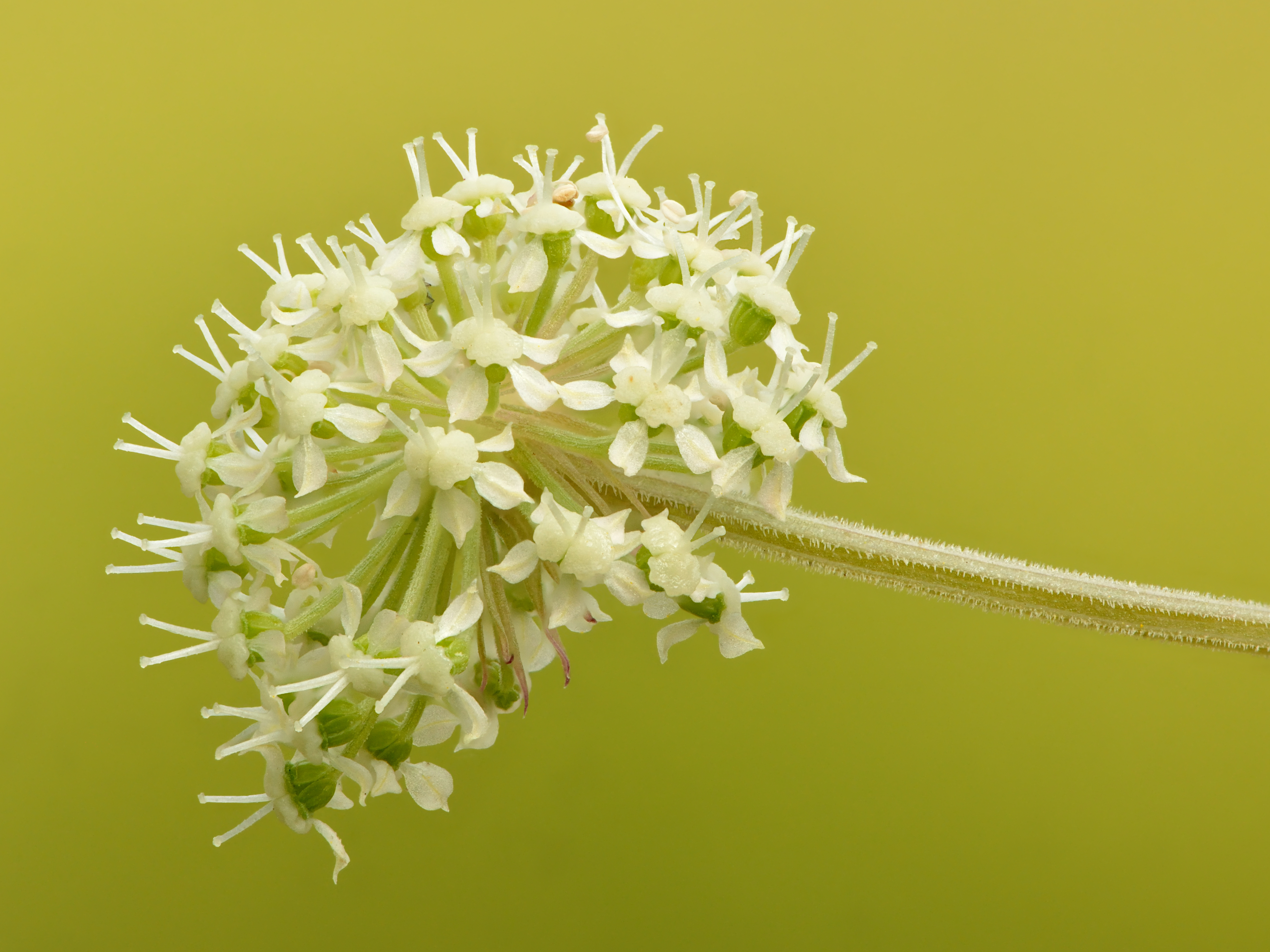
Flowers

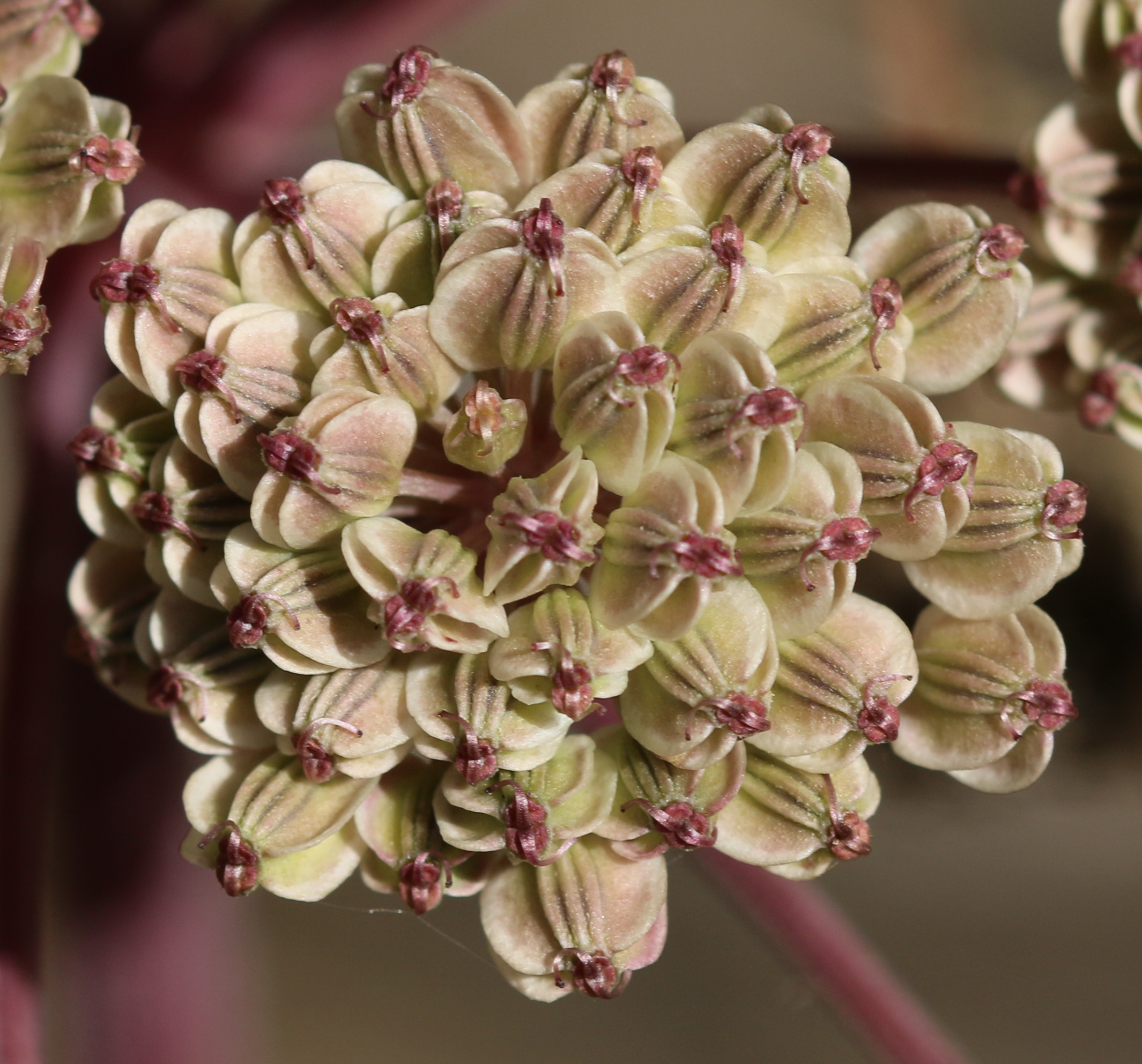
Developing fruits (seeds)
