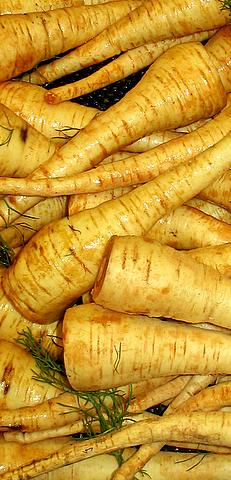
- A selection of parsnips

Scientific classification
- Kingdom: Plantae
- Clade: Tracheophytes
- Clade: Angiosperms
- Clade: Eudicots
- Clade: Asterids
- Order: Apiales
- Family: Apiaceae
- Subfamily: Apioideae
- Tribe: Tordylieae
- Subtribe: Tordyliinae
- Genus: Pastinaca; L.

Species
- 14, see text.

Synonyms
- Dumaniana Yıld. & B.Selvi; Elaphoboscum Tabern. ex Rupr., nom. superfl.; Malabaila Hoffm.; Pastinacha Hill

= Pastinaca =

Genus of flowering plants

Pastinaca (parsnips) is a genus of flowering plant in the family Apiaceae, comprising 15 species. Economically, the most important member of the genus is Pastinaca sativa, the parsnip.

== Etymology ==
The etymology of the generic name Pastinaca is not known with certainty. The name may be derived from the Latin word pastino (or pastinare), meaning "to prepare the ground for planting of the vine" (or more simply, "to dig") or the Latin word pastus, meaning "food", liberally translated as "Earth-food".

== Taxonomy ==
As of December 2022, Plants of the World Online accepted 15 species:

- Pastinaca argyrophylla Delip.
- Pastinaca armena Fisch. & C.A.Mey.
- Pastinaca aurantiaca (Albov) Kolak.
- Pastinaca clausii (Ledeb.) Calest.
- Pastinaca erzincanensis Menemen & Kandemir
- Pastinaca gelendostensis (Yıld. & B.Selvi) Hand
- Pastinaca glandulosa Boiss. & Hausskn.
- Pastinaca hirsuta Pančić
- Pastinaca kochii Duby
- Pastinaca lucida L.
- Pastinaca pimpinellifolia M.Bieb.
- Pastinaca sativa L. – parsnip
- Pastinaca trysia Stapf & Wettst.
- Pastinaca yildizii Dirmenci
- Pastinaca zozimoides Fenzl
