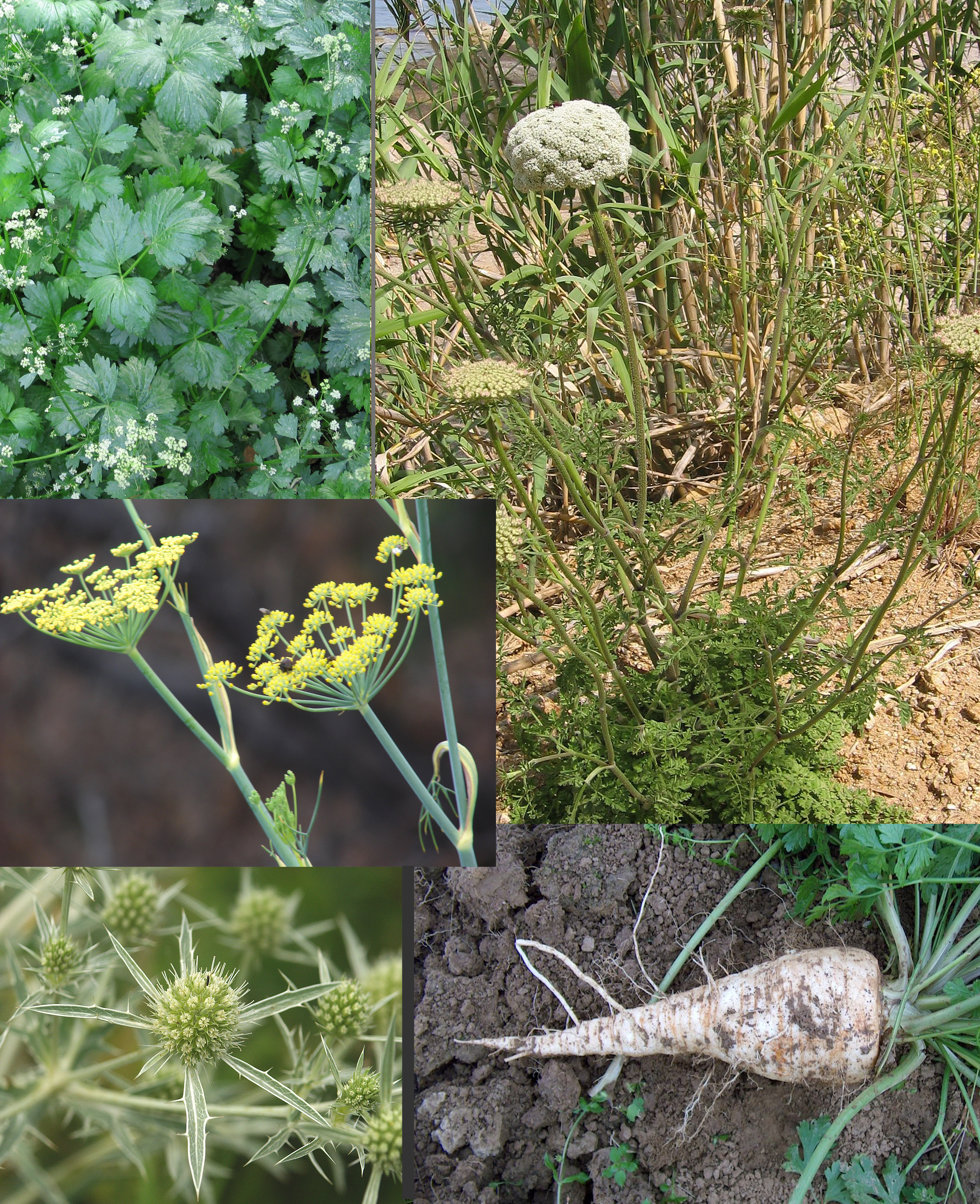
- Apiaceae: Apium leaves and tiny inflorescences, Daucus habit, Foeniculum inflorescences, Eryngium inflorescences, Petroselinum root.

Scientific classification
- Kingdom: Plantae
- Clade: Tracheophytes
- Clade: Angiosperms
- Clade: Eudicots
- Clade: Asterids
- Order: Apiales
- Family: Apiaceae; Lindl.

Type genus
- Apium L.

Subfamilies
- Mackinlayoideae Plunkett & Lowry; Azorelloideae Plunkett & Lowry; Saniculoideae Burnett; Apioideae Seem.

Synonyms
- Umbelliferae

= Apiaceae =

Apiaceae Temporal range: Eocene–Recent

Family of flowering plants

Apiaceae (/ˌeɪpiˈeɪsi.iː, -ˌaɪ/), also called Umbelliferae, is a family of mostly aromatic flowering plants named after the type genus Apium, and commonly known as the celery, carrot, or parsley family, or as umbellifers. It is the 16th-largest family of flowering plants, with more than 3,800 species in about 446 genera, including such well-known, and economically important plants as ajwain, angelica, anise, asafoetida, caraway, carrot, celery, chervil, coriander, cumin, dill, fennel, lovage, cow parsley, parsley, parsnip and sea holly, as well as silphium, a plant whose exact identity is unclear and which may be extinct.

The family Apiaceae also includes a significant number of phototoxic species, such as giant hogweed and parsnip, alongside a smaller number of deadly toxic paralytic species, such as poison hemlock, water hemlock, spotted cowbane, fool's parsley, and various species of water dropwort.

== Description ==
Most Apiaceae are annual, biennial or perennial herbs, and frequently have their leaves aggregated toward the base; a minority are woody shrubs or small trees such as Bupleurum fruticosum. Their leaves are of variable size, and alternately arranged, or with the upper leaves becoming nearly opposite. The leaves may be petiolate or sessile. There are no stipules but the petioles are frequently sheathing, and the leaves may be perfoliate. The leaf blade is usually dissected, ternate, or pinnatifid, but simple, and entire in some genera, e.g. Bupleurum. Commonly, their leaves emit a marked smell when crushed, aromatic to fetid, but absent in some species.

The defining characteristic of this family is the inflorescence, the flowers nearly always aggregated in terminal umbels, that may be simple or more commonly compound, often umbelliform cymes. The flowers are usually perfect (hermaphroditic), and actinomorphic, but there may be zygomorphic flowers at the edge of the umbel, as in carrot (Daucus carota) and coriander, with petals of unequal size, the ones pointing outward from the umbel larger than the ones pointing inward. Some are andromonoecious, polygamomonoecious, or even dioecious (as in Acronema), with a distinct calyx, and corolla, but the calyx is often highly reduced, to the point of being undetectable in many species, while the corolla can be white, yellow, pink or purple. The flowers are nearly perfectly pentamerous, with five petals and five stamens. There is often variation in the functionality of the stamens even within a single inflorescence. Some flowers are functionally staminate (where a pistil may be present but has no ovules capable of being fertilized) while others are functionally pistillate (where stamens are present but their anthers do not produce viable pollen). Pollination of one flower by the pollen of a different flower of the same plant (geitonogamy) is common. The gynoecium consists of two carpels fused into a single, bicarpellate pistil with an inferior ovary. Stylopodia support two styles, and secrete nectar, attracting pollinators like flies, mosquitoes, gnats, beetles, moths, and bees. The fruit is a schizocarp consisting of two fused carpels that separate at maturity into two mericarps, each containing a single seed. The fruits of many species are dispersed by wind but others such as those of Daucus spp., are covered in bristles, which may be hooked in sanicle Sanicula europaea and thus catch in the fur of animals. The seeds have an oily endosperm and often contain essential oils, containing aromatic compounds that are responsible for the flavour of commercially important umbelliferous seed such as anise, cumin and coriander. The shape and details of the ornamentation of the ripe fruits are important for identification to species level.

== Taxonomy ==
Apiaceae was first described by John Lindley in 1836. The name is derived from the type genus Apium, which was originally used by Pliny the Elder circa 50 AD for a celery-like plant. The alternative name for the family, Umbelliferae, derives from the inflorescence being generally in the form of a compound umbel. The family was one of the first to be recognized as a distinct group in Jacques Daleschamps' 1586 Historia generalis plantarum. With Robert Morison's 1672 Plantarum umbelliferarum distribution nova it became the first group of plants for which a systematic study was published.

The family is solidly placed within the Apiales order in the APG III system. It is closely related to Araliaceae and the boundaries between these families remain unclear. Traditionally groups within the family have been delimited largely based on fruit morphology, and the results from this have not been congruent with the more recent molecular phylogenetic analyses. The subfamilial and tribal classification for the family is currently in a state of flux, with many of the groups being found to be grossly paraphyletic or polyphyletic.

=== Classification and phylogeny ===
Prior to molecular phylogenetic studies, the family was subdivided primarily based on fruit characteristics. Molecular phylogenetic analyses from the mid-1990s onwards have shown that fruit characters evolved in parallel many times, so that using them in classification resulted in units that were not monophyletic. In 2004, it was proposed that Apiaceae should be divided into four subfamilies:

- Apioideae Seem.
- Azorelloideae G.M.Plunkett & Lowry
- Mackinlayoideae G.M.Plunkett & Lowry
- Saniculoideae Burnett

Apioideae is by far the largest subfamily with about 90% of the genera. Most subsequent studies have supported this division, although leaving some genera unplaced. A 2021 study suggested the relationships shown in the following cladogram.

- Apiaceae
  - Platysace
  - - Mackinlayoideae
    - - Klotzschia
      - - Azorelloideae
        - - Hermas
          - - Phlyctidocarpa + Saniculoideae
            - Apioideae

The Platysace clade and the genera Klotzschia and Hermas fell outside the four subfamilies. It was suggested that they could be accommodated in subfamilies of their own. Phlyctidocarpa was formerly placed in the subfamily Apioideae, but if kept there makes Apioideae paraphyletic. It could be placed in an enlarged Saniculoideae, or restored to Apioideae if the latter were expanded to include Saniculoideae.

The subfamilies can be further divided into tribes and clades, with many clades falling outside formally recognized tribes.

=== Evolution ===
The earliest fossils of the group, represented by pollen, date to the Eocene epoch, though the family itself is estimated to have originated during the Late Cretaceous, likely in Australasia.

=== Genera ===
The number of genera accepted by sources varies. As of December 2022, Plants of the World Online (PoWO) accepted 444 genera, while GRIN Taxonomy accepted 462. The PoWO genera are not a subset of those in GRIN; for example, Haloselinum is accepted by PoWO but not by GRIN, while Halosciastrum is accepted by GRIN but not by PoWO, which treats it as a synonym of Angelica. The Angiosperm Phylogeny Website had an "approximate list" of 446 genera.

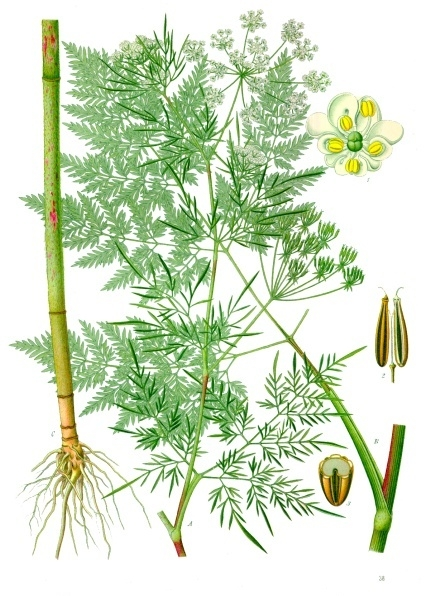
Chaerophyllum bulbosum

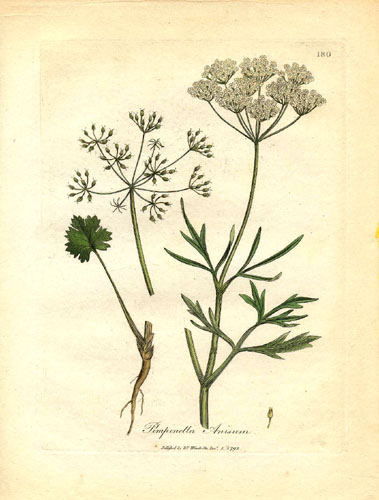
Anise (Pimpinella anisum)
from Woodville (1793)

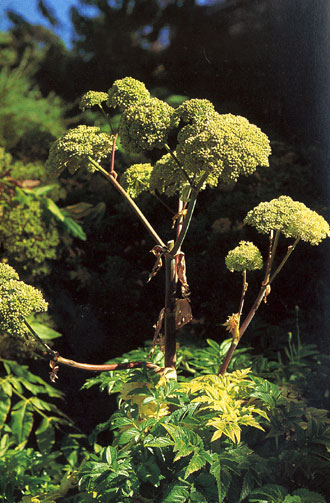
Angelica archangelica

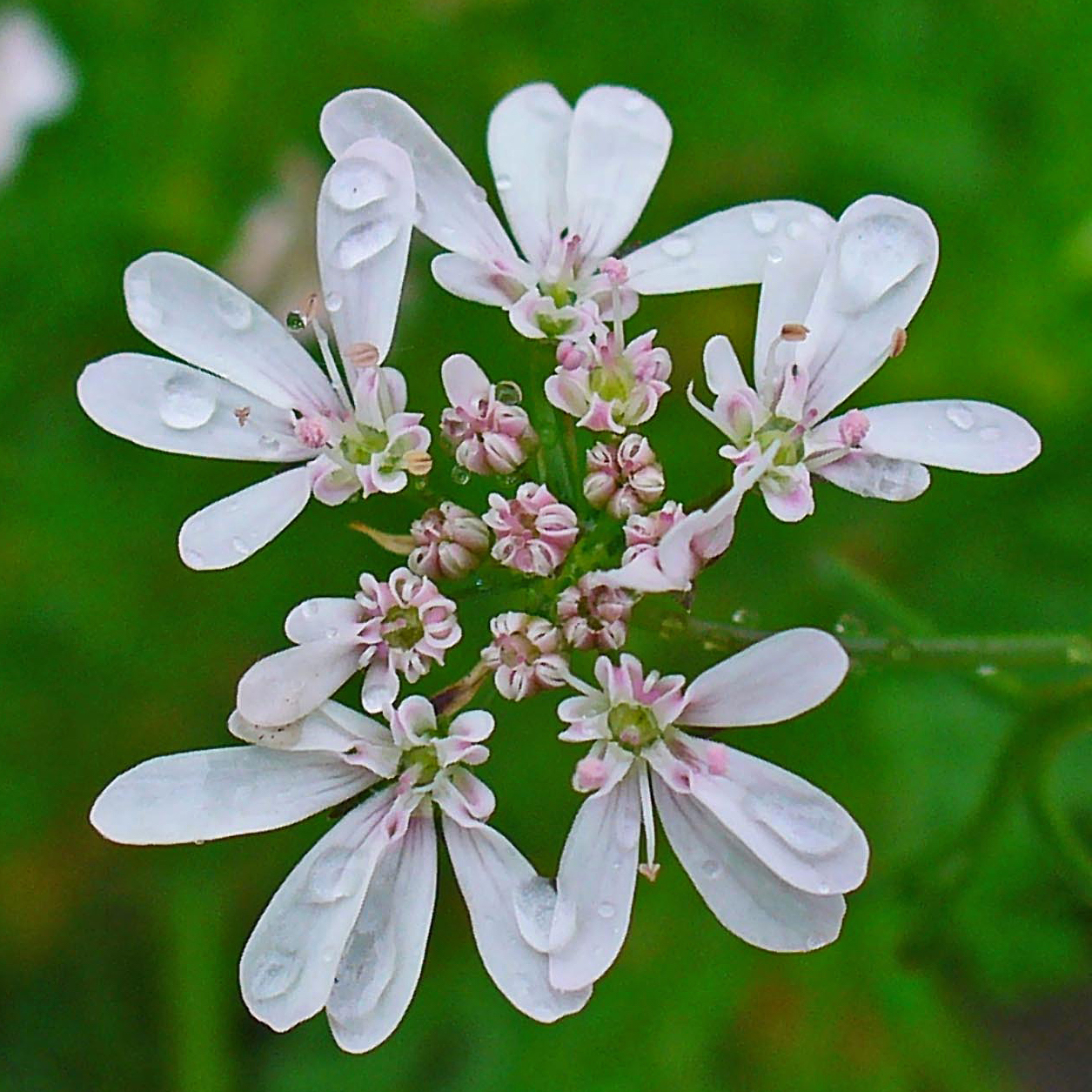
Umbel of Coriandrum sativum showing strong zygomorphy (asymmetry) in the outer flowers.

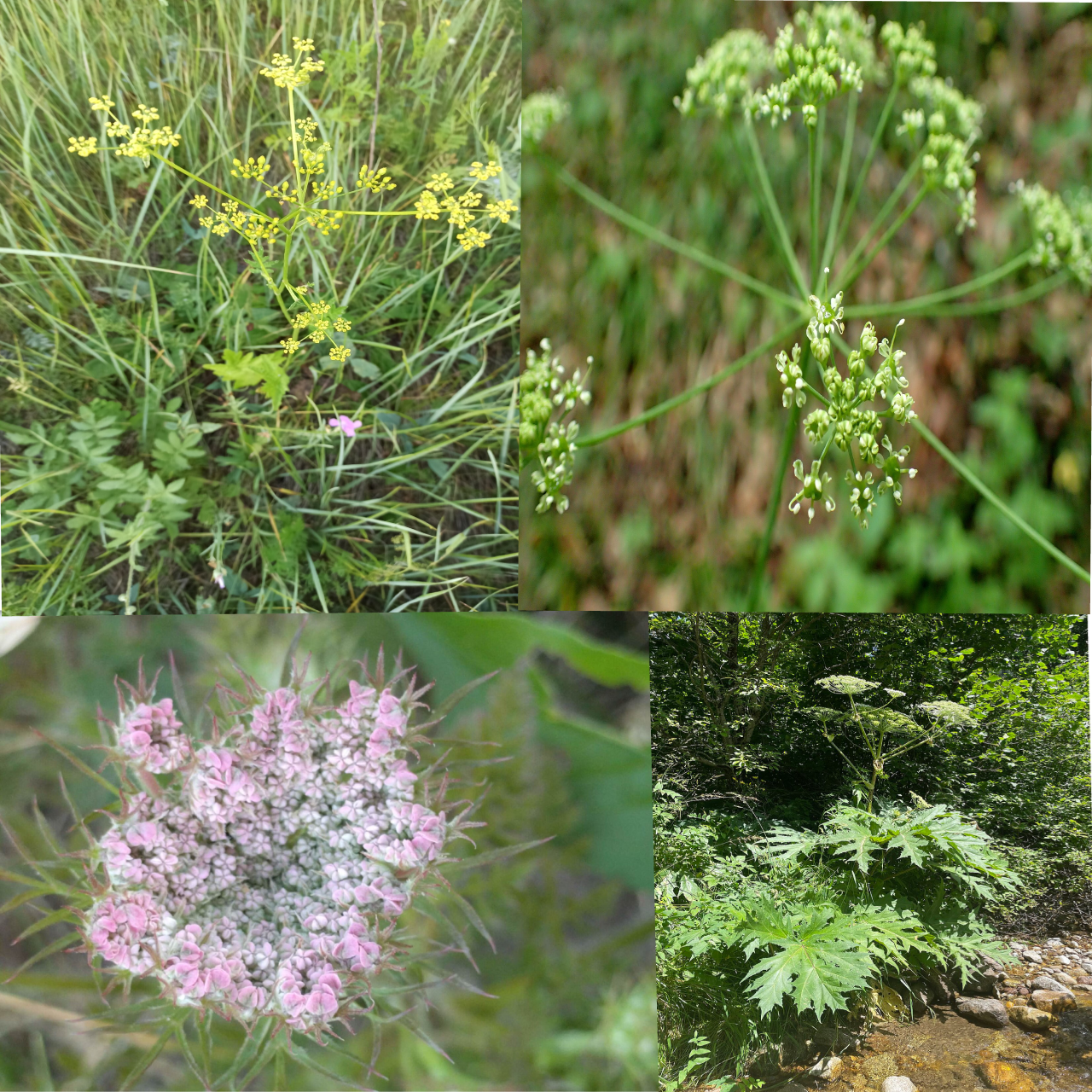
4 Apiaceae family members: Daucus carota, Heracleum mantegazzianum, Pastinaca sativa, Laser trilobum

== Ecology ==
The black swallowtail butterfly, Papilio polyxenes, uses the family Apiaceae for food and host plants for oviposition. The 22-spot ladybird is also commonly found eating mildew on these plants.

== Uses ==
Many members of this family are cultivated for various purposes. Parsnip (Pastinaca sativa), carrot (Daucus carota) and Hamburg parsley (Petroselinum crispum) produce tap roots that are large enough to be useful as food. Many species produce essential oils in their leaves or fruits and as a result are flavourful aromatic herbs. Examples are parsley (Petroselinum crispum), coriander (Coriandrum sativum), culantro, and dill (Anethum graveolens). The seeds may be used in cuisine, as with coriander (Coriandrum sativum), fennel (Foeniculum vulgare), cumin (Cuminum cyminum), and caraway (Carum carvi).

Other notable cultivated Apiaceae include chervil (Anthriscus cerefolium), angelica (Angelica spp.), celery (Apium graveolens), arracacha (Arracacia xanthorrhiza), sea holly (Eryngium spp.), asafoetida (Ferula asafoetida), galbanum (Ferula gummosa), cicely (Myrrhis odorata), anise (Pimpinella anisum), lovage (Levisticum officinale), and hacquetia (Sanicula epipactis).

=== Cultivation ===
Generally, all members of this family are best cultivated in the cool-season garden; they may not grow at all if the soils are too warm. Almost every widely cultivated plant of this group is a considered useful as a companion plant. One reason is that the tiny flowers, clustered into umbels, are well suited for ladybugs, parasitic wasps, and predatory flies, which drink nectar when not reproducing. They then prey upon insect pests on nearby plants. Some of the members of this family considered "herbs" produce scents that are believed to mask the odours of nearby plants, thus making them harder for insect pests to find.

=== Other uses ===
The poisonous members of the Apiaceae have been used for a variety of purposes globally. The poisonous Oenanthe crocata has been used as an aid in suicides, and arrow poisons have been made from various other family species.

Daucus carota has been used as coloring for butter.

Dorema ammoniacum, Ferula galbaniflua, and Ferula moschata (sumbul) are sources of incense.

The woody Azorella compacta Phil. has been used in South America for fuel.

== Toxicity ==
Many species in the family Apiaceae produce phototoxic substances (called furanocoumarins) that sensitize human skin to sunlight. Contact with plant parts that contain furanocoumarins, followed by exposure to sunlight, may cause phytophotodermatitis, a serious skin inflammation. Phototoxic species include Ammi majus, Notobubon galbanum, the parsnip (Pastinaca sativa) and numerous species of the genus Heracleum, especially the giant hogweed (Heracleum mantegazzianum). Of all the plant species that have been reported to induce phytophotodermatitis, approximately half belong to the family Apiaceae.

The family Apiaceae also includes a smaller number of neurotoxic species, including poison hemlock, water hemlock, spotted cowbane, fool's parsley, and various species of water dropwort.

Some members of the family Apiaceae, including carrot, celery, fennel, parsley and parsnip, contain polyynes, an unusual class of organic compounds that exhibit cytotoxic effects.
