= List of Ferula species =

The following species in the flowering plant genus Ferula are accepted by Plants of the World Online. Reticulate evolution, as revealed by incongruities between nuclear DNA and chloroplast DNA in some species, has led to taxonomic difficulties in this genus.

- Ferula afghanica Gilli
- Ferula akitschkensis B.Fedtsch. ex Koso-Pol.
- Ferula alaica Pimenov & Melibaev
- Ferula alliacea Boiss.
- Ferula amanicola Hub.-Mor. & Pesmen
- Ferula ammoniacum (D.Don) Spalik, M.Panahi, Piwczynski & Puchalka
- Ferula anatolica Boiss.
- Ferula angreni Korovin
- Ferula armandi Mouterde
- Ferula arnoldiana S.Scholz & Reyes-Bet.
- Ferula arrigonii Bocchieri
- Ferula assa-foetida L.
- Ferula atlantica Elalaoui & Cauwet
- Ferula aucheri (Boiss.) Piwczynski, Spalik, M.Panahi & Puchalka
- Ferula badrakema Koso-Pol.
- Ferula baluchistanica Kitam.
- Ferula barbeyi Post
- Ferula behboudiana (Rech.f. & Esfand.) D.F.Chamb.
- Ferula bilasi Post
- Ferula biverticellata J.Thiébaut
- Ferula blanchei Boiss.
- Ferula botschantzevii Korovin
- Ferula brevipedicellata Pe?men ex Sagiroglu & H.Duman
- Ferula bungeana Kitag.
- Ferula calcarea Pimenov
- Ferula canescens (Ledeb.) Ledeb.
- Ferula caspica M.Bieb.
- Ferula ceratophylla Regel & Schmalh.
- Ferula clematidifolia Koso-Pol.
- Ferula communis L.
- Ferula conocaula Korovin
- Ferula coskunii H.Duman & Sagiroglu
- Ferula costata Korovin ex Nasir
- Ferula cupularis (Boiss.) Spalik & S.R.Downie
- Ferula cypria Post
- Ferula czatkalensis Pimenov
- Ferula daninii Zohary
- Ferula decurrens Korovin
- Ferula dictyocarpa Rech.f.
- Ferula dissecta (Ledeb.) Ledeb.
- Ferula divaricata Pimenov & Kljuykov
- Ferula diversivittata Regel & Schmalh.
- Ferula downieorum Spalik, M.Panahi, Piwczynski & Puchalka
- Ferula drudeana Korovin
- Ferula dshizakensis Korovin
- Ferula dubjanskyi Korovin
- Ferula duranii Sagiroglu & H.Duman
- Ferula elaeochytris Korovin
- Ferula elbursensis (Mozaff.) Spalik & S.R.Downie
- Ferula equisetacea Koso-Pol.
- Ferula euxina Pimenov
- Ferula fedoroviorum Pimenov
- Ferula fedtschenkoana Koso-Pol.
- Ferula ferganensis Lipsky ex Korovin
- Ferula flabelliloba Rech.f. & Aellen
- Ferula foetida (Bunge) Regel
- Ferula foetidissima Regel & Schmalh.
- Ferula fontqueri Jury
- Ferula fukanensis K.M.Shen
- Ferula gabrielii Rech.f.
- Ferula ghorana Rech.f.
- Ferula gigantea B.Fedtsch.
- Ferula glaberrima Korovin
- Ferula glabra Rech.f. & Riedl
- Ferula glabrifolia M.Panahi, Piwczynski, Puchalka & Spalik
- Ferula glauca L.
- Ferula glaucopruinosa (Rech.f.) Akhani
- Ferula gouliminensis Elalaoui & Cauwet
- Ferula gracilis (Ledeb.) Ledeb.
- Ferula grigoriewii B.Fedtsch.
- Ferula groessingii Riedl & Riedl-Dorn
- Ferula gummosa Boiss.
- Ferula gypsacea Korovin
- Ferula halophila Pesmen
- Ferula haussknechtii H.Wolff ex Rech.f.
- Ferula hedgeana Pimenov & Kljuykov
- Ferula heratensis Rech.f.
- Ferula hermonis Boiss.
- Ferula heuffelii Griseb. ex Heuff.
- Ferula hexiensis K.M.Shen
- Ferula hezarlalehzarica Ajani
- Ferula hindukushensis Kitam.
- Ferula hissarica Pimenov & Kljuykov
- Ferula huber-morathii Pesmen
- Ferula hyrcana (Koso-Pol.) Puchalka, Spalik, Panahi & Piwczynski
- Ferula iliensis Krasn. ex Korovin
- Ferula incisoserrata Pimenov & J.V.Baranova
- Ferula jaeschkeana Vatke
- Ferula juniperina Korovin
- Ferula karakalensis Korovin
- Ferula karakumica Geld. & A.V.Pavlenko
- Ferula karatavica Regel & Schmalh.
- Ferula karataviensis (Regel & Schmalh.) Korovin
- Ferula karategina Lipsky ex Korovin
- Ferula karelinii Bunge
- Ferula kashanica Rech.f.
- Ferula kelifi Korovin
- Ferula kelleri Koso-Pol.
- Ferula kingdon-wardii H.Wolff
- Ferula kirialovii Pimenov
- Ferula kokanica Regel & Schmalh.
- Ferula korshinskyi Korovin
- Ferula koso-poljanskyi Korovin
- Ferula krylovii Korovin
- Ferula kuhistanica Korovin
- Ferula kyzylkumica Korovin
- Ferula lancerotensis Parl. ex G.Hartung
- Ferula lapidosa Korovin
- Ferula laseroides (Akhani) Spalik & S.R.Downie
- Ferula latiloba Korovin
- Ferula latipinna A.Santos
- Ferula latisecta Rech.f. & Aellen
- Ferula lehmannii Boiss.
- Ferula leiophylla Korovin
- Ferula leucographa Korovin
- Ferula licentiana Hand.-Mazz.
- Ferula linczevskii Korovin
- Ferula lipskyi Korovin
- Ferula lithophila Pimenov
- Ferula litwinowiana Koso-Pol.
- Ferula longifolia Fisch. ex Spreng.
- Ferula longipedunculata Pesmen
- Ferula longipes Coss. ex Bonnier & Maury
- Ferula loscosii (Lange) Willk.
- Ferula lutensis Rech.f.
- Ferula lycia Boiss.
- Ferula macrocolea (Boiss.) Boiss.
- Ferula malacophylla Pimenov & J.V.Baranova
- Ferula marmarica Asch. & Taub.
- Ferula melitensis Brullo, C.Brullo, Cambria, Giusso, Salmeri & Bacch.
- Ferula mervynii Sagiroglu & H.Duman
- Ferula michaelii M.Panahi, Piwczynski, Puchalka & Spalik
- Ferula microcolea (Boiss.) Boiss.
- Ferula mikraskythiana Mátis, A.Z.Szabó & L.Bartha
- Ferula mogoltavica Lipsky ex Korovin
- Ferula mongolica (V.M.Vinogr. & Kamelin) V.M.Vinogr. & Kamelin
- Ferula moschata (H.Reinsch) Koso-Pol.
- Ferula myrioloba Rech.f.
- Ferula narthex Boiss.
- Ferula negevensis Zohary
- Ferula nevskii Korovin
- Ferula nuda Spreng.
- Ferula nuratavica Pimenov
- Ferula nuristanica Rech.f.
- Ferula olivacea (Diels) H.Wolff
- Ferula oopoda (Boiss. & Buhse) Boiss.
- Ferula orbicularis Post ex Beauverd & Zohary
- Ferula orientalis L.
- Ferula ovczinnikovii Pimenov
- Ferula ovina Boiss.
- Ferula pachycaulos Rech.f.
- Ferula pachyphylla Korovin
- Ferula paeoniifolia X.G.Ma & C.Y.Liao
- Ferula pallida Korovin
- Ferula palmyrensis Post & Beauverd
- Ferula paniculata Ledeb.
- Ferula parva Freyn & Bornm.
- Ferula penninervis Regel & Schmalh.
- Ferula persica Willd.
- Ferula pimenovii Lazkov
- Ferula pisidica Akalin & Miski
- Ferula plurivittata Korovin
- Ferula porandica (Gilli) Pimenov & Degtjareva
- Ferula potaninii Korovin ex Pavlov
- Ferula prangifolia Korovin
- Ferula pratovii F.O.Khasanov & I.I.Mal'tsev
- Ferula pseudalliacea Rech.f.
- Ferula racemosoumbellata (Gilli) Rech.f.
- Ferula rechingeri D.F.Chamb.
- Ferula renardii (Regel & Schmalh.) Pimenov
- Ferula rigidula Fisch. ex DC.
- Ferula rubricaulis Boiss.
- Ferula rubroarenosa Korovin
- Ferula rutbaensis C.C.Towns.
- Ferula sadleriana Ledeb.
- Ferula samariae Zohary & P.H.Davis
- Ferula samarkandica Korovin
- Ferula sauvagei Elalaoui & Cauwet
- Ferula schtschurowskiana Regel & Schmalh.
- Ferula seravschanica Pimenov & J.V.Baranova
- Ferula serpentinica Rech.f.
- Ferula sharifii Rech.f. & Esfand.
- Ferula shehbaziana S.A.Ahmad
- Ferula sibirica Willd.
- Ferula sinaica Boiss.
- Ferula sinkiangensis K.M.Shen
- Ferula sjugatensis Bjat.
- Ferula songarica Pall. ex Willd.
- Ferula sphenobasis C.C.Towns.
- Ferula stenocarpa Boiss. & Hausskn.
- Ferula stenoloba Rech.f.
- Ferula stewartiana O.E.Schulz
- Ferula subtilis Korovin
- Ferula sugatensis Bajtenov
- Ferula syreitschikowii Koso-Pol.
- Ferula szowitsiana DC.
- Ferula tabasensis Rech.f.
- Ferula tadshikorum Pimenov
- Ferula tatarica Fisch. ex Spreng.
- Ferula taucumica Baitenov
- Ferula tenuisecta Korovin
- Ferula tenuissima Hub.-Mor. & Pesmen
- Ferula teterrima Kar. & Kir.
- Ferula thomsonii C.B.Clarke
- Ferula tingitana L.
- Ferula trachelocarpa Rech.f.
- Ferula trachyphylla Rech.f. & Riedl
- Ferula transiliensis (Regel & Herder) Pimenov
- Ferula tschimganica Lipsky ex Korovin
- Ferula tschuiliensis Bajtenov
- Ferula tuberifera Korovin
- Ferula tunetana Pomel ex Batt.
- Ferula ugamica Korovin
- Ferula varia (Schrenk) Trautv.
- Ferula vesceritensis Coss. & Durieu ex Trab.
- Ferula vicaria Korovin
- Ferula violacea Korovin
- Ferula xanthocarpa Rech.f.
- Ferula xeromorpha Korovin
- Ferula xylorhachis Rech.f.
