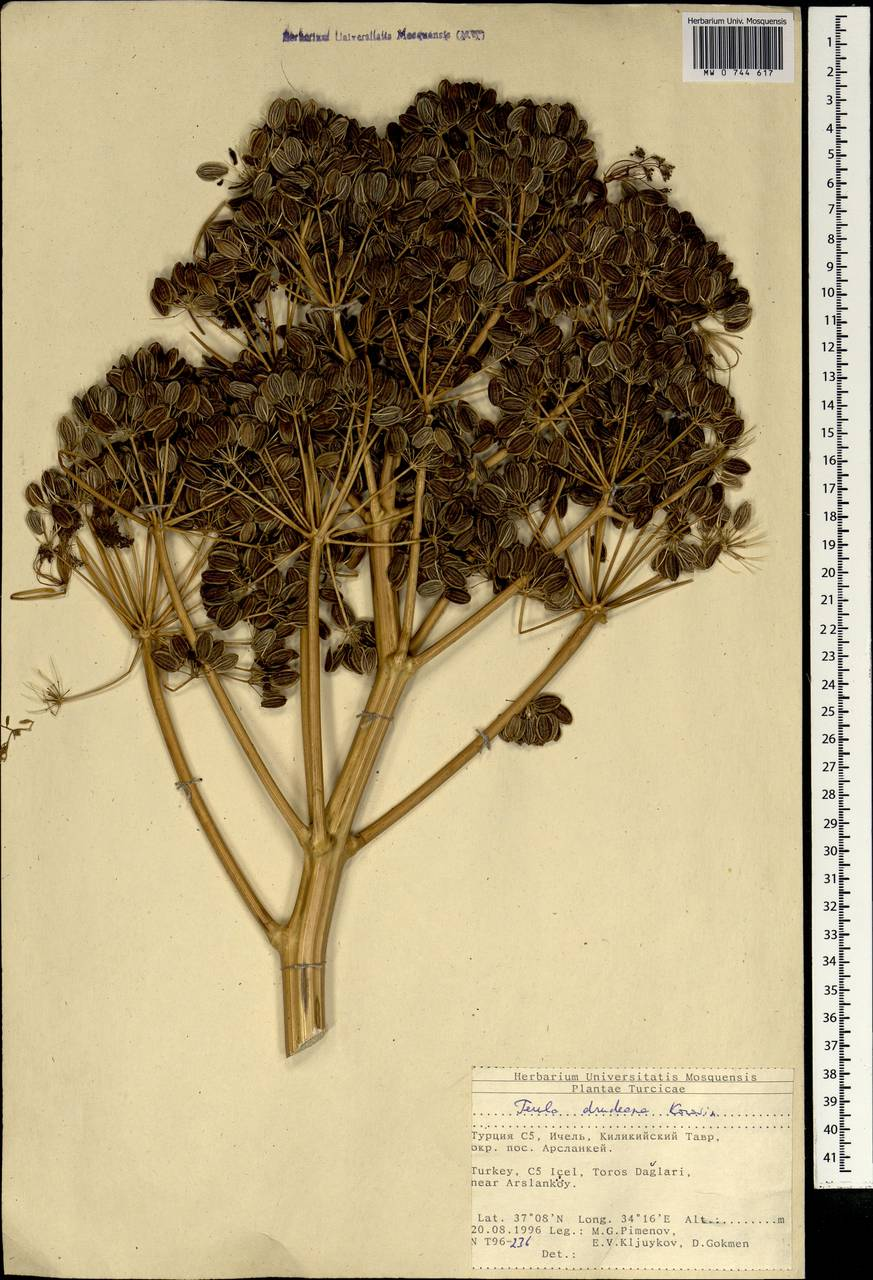
- Pimenov's 1996 specimen

Scientific classification
- Kingdom: Plantae
- Clade: Tracheophytes
- Clade: Angiosperms
- Clade: Eudicots
- Clade: Asterids
- Order: Apiales
- Family: Apiaceae
- Genus: Ferula
- Species: F. drudeana

Binomial name
- Ferula drudeana Korovin

= Ferula drudeana =

Species of flowering plant

Ferula drudeana is a species of flowering plant in the family Apiaceae, native to the Central Taurus Mountains area of Turkey. It has been proposed as a candidate for the possibly extinct silphium plant of antiquity. It is known from only three locations in Turkey, all sites of longstanding villages.

== Description and ecology ==
Ferula drudeana is a tall monocarpic herb from around one meter to 2.5 meters high at flowering time. It has stout branching roots resembling ginseng in shape, 3–8 cm (1.2–3.1 in) in diameter, and having a dense fibrous collar; a grooved stalk and stout striated stems; frond-like basal leaves and pinnate celery-like leaves with a stout basal sheath clasping the stem. Yellow flowers are produced in large umbels.

It was first collected by the German engineer and botanical collector Walter E. Siehe in the early 20th century, probably in the north of today's Adana Province, and misidentified as Ferula ovina. Depending on the collection date, Siehe's "Adana" would have referred to Adana vilayet of the Ottoman Empire rather than the Turkish province of today, and his type locality "between Farasch and Jagaly" is also not well resolvable—it probably refers to the formerly Greek village Pharasa (Φάρασα/Faraşa), today named Çamlıca, and Yahyalı. Both localities are in Yahyalı district, Kayseri Province, on the middle Zamantı River.

Siehe sent samples to Komarov Botanical Institute in St. Petersburg and to the Royal Botanic Garden in Edinburgh. In 1930, while studying the samples at the Leningrad herbarium, Evgenii Korovin identified the plant as a new species, naming it Ferula drudeana, in honour of Drude, in his 1947 monograph of the genus. Until 2003, the plant was only collected once more, by Michail Georgevich Pimenov in 1996, north of Arslanköy at the border between Mersin and Karaman Provinces. From that specimen, its karyotype was determined as 2n=22. Siehe at one time lived at Fındıkpınarı, just 25 km southwest of Pimenov's site, and his cryptic type locality might conceivably refer to some since-renamed villages in this area. However, subsequent searches failed to find the plant in the Arslanköy–Fındıkpınarı area. In 2003, a population was finally located along the Çamlıca–Yahyalı road, within 10 km or less of Siehe's presumed type locality. Though few in number, the recorded localities delimit a range extending along the southern third of the Anatolian diagonal across the Bolkar, Tahtalı, and possibly Aladağlar ranges of the Central Taurus Mountains, though the species seems to be rare, localized, and possibly subject to unsustainable collection and grazing.

In its native habitat F. drudeana grows around 1500 m above mean sea level on rocky chalky soils, and it probably ranges higher up—Pimenov's specimen was collected about 2,300–2,350 m (7,550–7,710 ft) AMSL. Other recorded plants in its habitat were mainly Lamiaceae (Marrubium cephalanthum, Nepeta caesarea, Salvia heldreichiana, Scutellaria orientalis subsp. pinnatifida and Stachys sparsipilosa) and some Campanulaceae (Asyneuma michauxioides, Campanula sp. and Michauxia tchihatchewii), as well as fellow Apiaceae Prangos uechtritzii and Tordylium elegans, the ubiquitous wall barley (Hordeum murinum), and some other herbaceous plants (Alkanna kotschyana, Dianthus strictus var. subenervis, Iberis aucheri, Psephellus huber-morathii, and unidentified Astragalus, Hypericum, Veronica and Verbascum). Shrubs and trees in the habitat were recorded to be Quercus cerris var. cerris, Paliurus spina-christi, and Pistacia terebinthus subsp. terebinthus. Whether Ferula drudeana also ranges into the locally widespread Pinus brutia forest remains to be determined. It takes at least ten years to mature, dies after flowering once, and requires cold stratification to germinate—thereby making it altogether very hard to cultivate and propagate, and vulnerable to unsustainable use in the wild: the species would probably be rated as Critically Endangered.

== Silphium hypothesis ==
In 2021, Mahmut Miski proposed that F. drudeana is the species known in antiquity as silphium. Miski began his research on F. drudeana in the wild of Mount Hasan in 1983.

A criticism of this hypothesis centers on geographic ranges: silphium grew in North Africa while F. drudeana is native to Turkey. A 2018 study resolved F. drudeana as a narrowly endemic species restricted to a tiny range in Turkey's Adana and Kayseri Provinces, descended from Central Asian Ferula, and having no connection to North Africa. All previously studied North African Ferula belong to a well-distinct and monophyletic group containing the widespread Ferula communis and its more localized relatives from the Western and Central Mediterranean; there is no indication that any other lineage of Ferula ever occurred west of the Aegean/Black Sea region. Miski's 2021 paper does not address evidence for F. drudeana having originated in the southern Caspian Sea region.

Another criticism focuses on the 2021 paper's methodology, which does not account for observations about Ferula which were published in 2008. Morphological studies could misleadingly suggest a relationship with silphium, as the external appearance of Ferula varies highly within clades: individuals within the Ferula genus often resemble unrelated species rather than closely related species. Similarly, evidence in the form of folk medicine uses is—at best—an equivocal indicator.

A competing theory holds that the silphium plant was a sterile hybrid, and species of Ferula commonly do hybridize.

== Taxonomy and systematics ==
Evgenii Korovin in 1947 proposed a subgenus Merwia for certain species of Ferula—namely F. litwinowiana (for which Merwia was originally established as a distinct genus by Boris Fedtschenko) and its presumed closest relatives, each of whose seeds have 2–10 vittae (oil ducts) on the outer face, and 4–18 on the inner face where two seeds face each other. He did not assign the barely-known F. drudeana to this subgenus, but its seeds were eventually determined to have 2–3 oil ducts on the outer face, and 6–10 on the inside. Seed anatomy is the one morphological feature in Ferula which somewhat reliably indicates relationships between species, and indeed the bulk of Korovin's subgenus Merwia was found to form a rather well-circumscribed group in two 2018 molecular phylogenetics studies.

However, the clade to which these species belong also includes Ferula assa-foetida, which is not placed in Merwia but in Narthex, established (as a distinct genus, and later down-ranked to subgenus) by Hugh Falconer in 1847. Hence, subgenus Merwia is a mere synonym of Narthex, but Merwia was validated as a section name for the core group of subgenus Narthex—otherwise known as "Ferula clade H" in recent studies—containing (among others) F. assa-foetida, F. litwinowiana, and F. drudeana. The internal relationships of section Narthex are hard to resolve due to rampant hybridization causing reticulate evolution in many species of this section (and indeed, across the entire subgenus Narthex). Even so, section Merwia does seem to be a valid clade: while its monophyly was only moderately well supported in the 2018 studies, this was due to a number of hard-to-place basal lineages (such as the F. pseudalliacea group and F. negevensis) which may or may not belong to the section; hence, its circumscription is debatable, not its taxonomic validity.

The precise relationships of F. drudeana within section Merwia remain unclear. A sample from Kayseri Province collected in 2004 was found to be highly similar to one specimen of F. szowitsiana in the molecular analyses, while the other F. szowitsiana samples were closer to F. litwinowiana and most (but not all) F. assa-foetida specimens studied. Nuclear DNA of 5.8S rRNA and partial ITS1/2 was successfully extracted from Siehe's ancient specimen, but resolved as identical to the corresponding sequences of another old Ferula specimen of an undetermined species of subgenus Narthex section Peucedanoides (also known as "Ferula clade A"). The latter result can be explained by the degradation and/or cross-contamination commonly found when analysing DNA of old specimens, while the aberrant F. szowitsiana sample was most likely descended from an ancestor that had hybridized with F. drudeana. In this case, the correct DNA sequence of F. drudeana would be the one from the 2004 Kayseri specimen, making F. drudeana a quite singular member of its section (as is also suggested by its morphology, which is unique within section Merwia), without any particularly close relatives, and roughly equidistant from species such as the F. assa-foetida/F. litwinowiana group, F. gummosa, and F. persica, which are found all around the southern Caspian Sea.

Meanwhile, the analyzed Ferula species occurring in or near the former range of silphium unequivocally resolved as members of the robustly monophyletic Ferula clade C, subclade C1, which constitutes section Ferula of subgenus Ferula. While hybridization does also seem to commonly occur in this section, as far as is known it invariably involves the widespread F. communis as one parent, and one of its closely related restricted-range relatives or descendants as the other. The only putative instance of hybridization between subgenus Ferula and Asian subgenera found so far must have occurred right after the divergence of the Western/Central Mediterranean lineage, and produced the conspicuously small-fruited Anatolian and Iranian species of subgenus Ferula, which form section Stenocarpa, also known as "clade C, subclade C2".
