= Balsam =

Resinous exudate which forms on certain kinds of trees and shrubs

Balsam is the resinous exudate (or sap) which forms on certain kinds of trees and shrubs, particularly species belonging to genera such as Myroxylon, Abies, Copaifera, Styrax, and Populus. They may occur naturally as resinous exudates following injury to bark or wood tissues. Balsam (from Latin: balsamum "gum of the balsam tree", ultimately from a Semitic source such as Hebrew: בֹּשֶׂם, romanized: bośem, lit. 'spice, perfume') owes its name to the biblical Balm of Gilead.

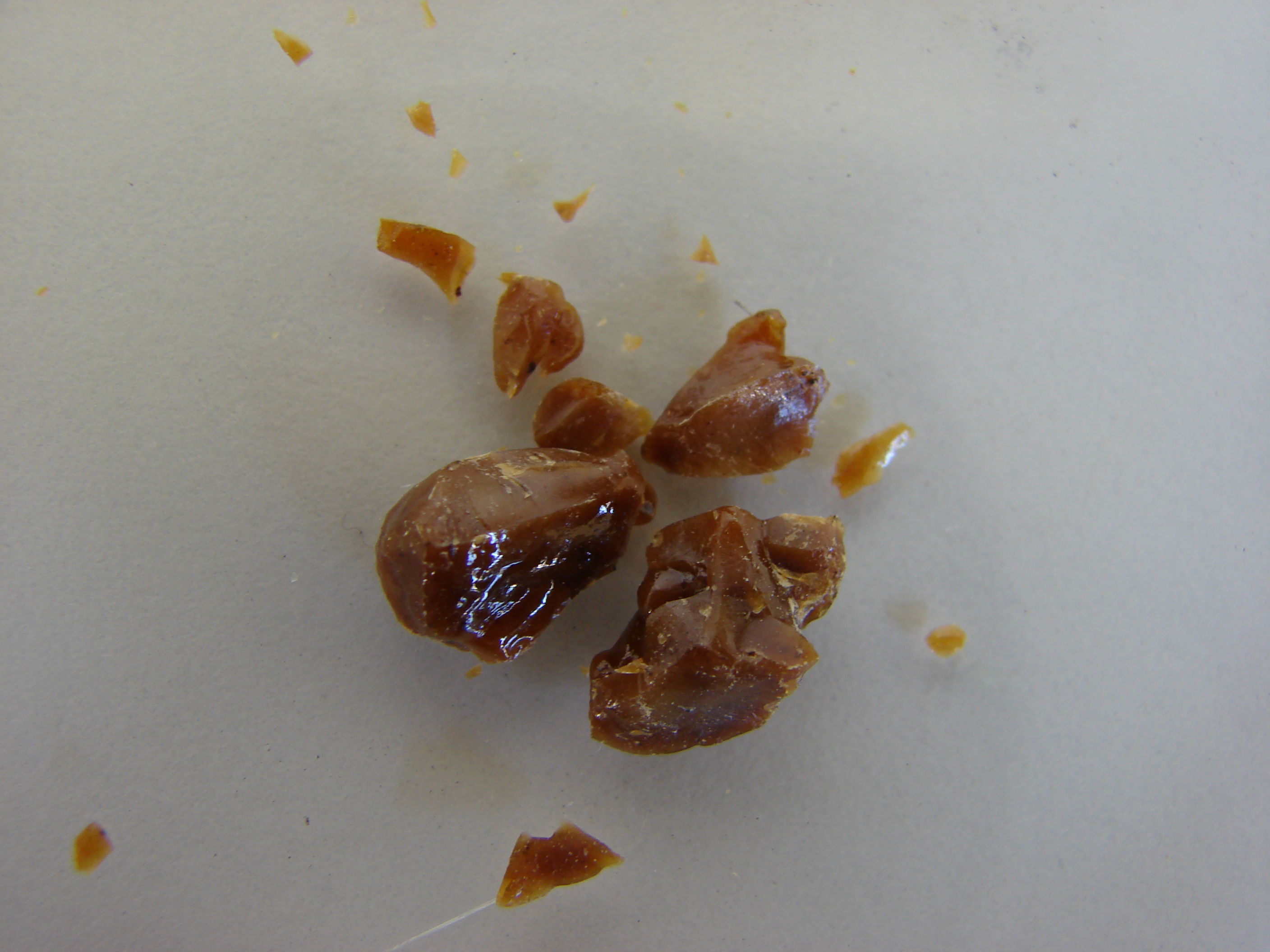
Balsamum tolutanum, Myroxylon balsamum

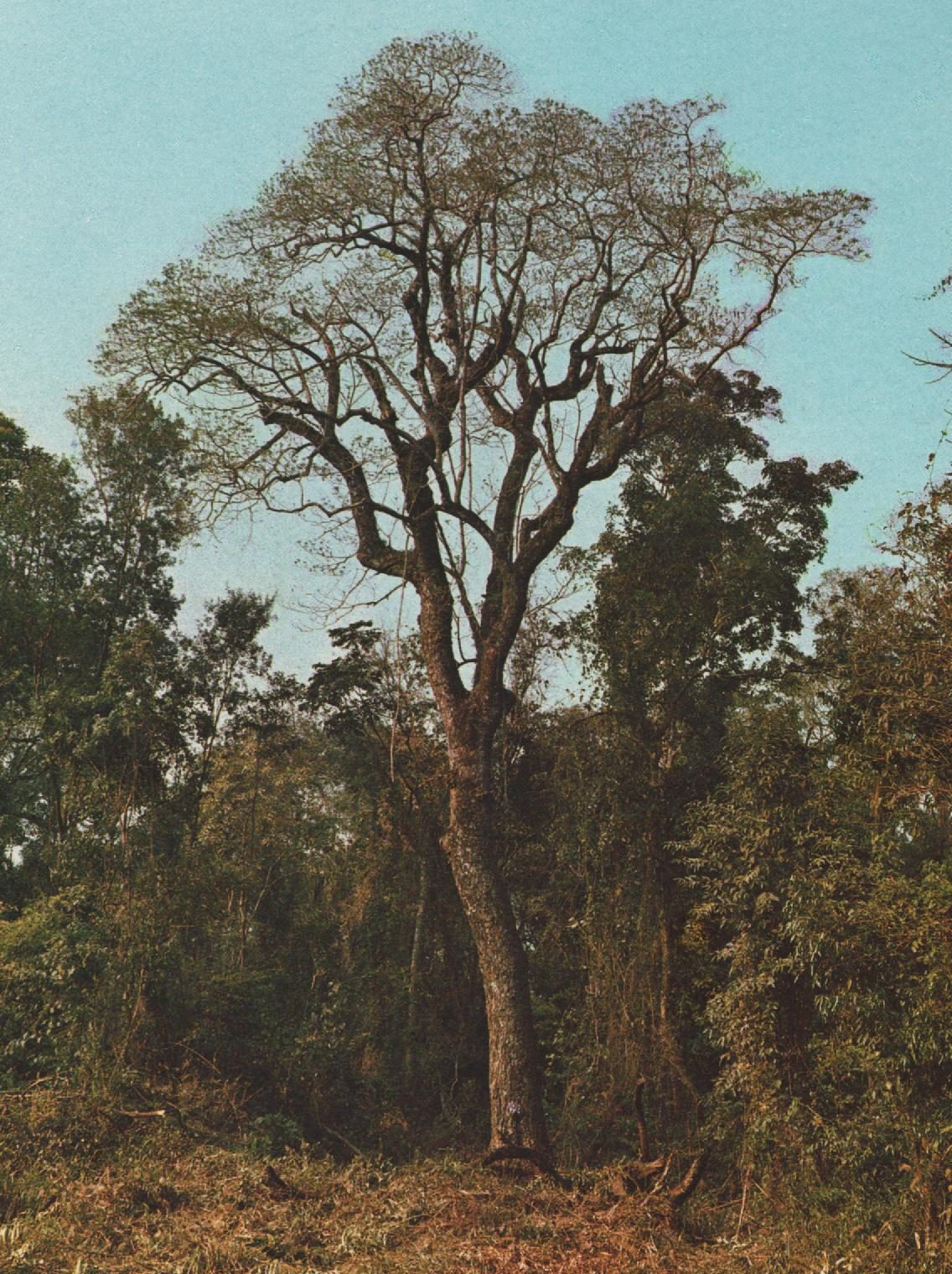
Myroxylon, the source of Balsam of Peru and Balsam of Tolu, is a genus of tree grown in Central America and South America. Pictured is Myroxylon peruiferum.

== Chemistry ==
Balsams often contain benzoic or cinnamic acid or their esters.

== The Balsam of Matariyya ==
The Balsam of Matariyya was a substance famous as a panacea among physicians in the Middle East and Europe during the Antique and Medieval periods. The substance has long been used as a medicine, with early references to the substance recorded as far back as 285 BC. The Balsam of Matariyya was said to be derived from an Egyptian plant and is sometimes also referred to as the balm of Gilead or the balm of Mecca.

== List of balsams ==
- Acaroid resin (Xanthorrhoea spp.)
- Acouchi balsam (Protium spp.)
- Ammoniacum
- Asafoetida (Laser)
- Balm of Gilead
- Balm of Mecca
- Balsam fir - (Abies balsamea)
- Balsam of Peru
- Balsam of Tolu
- Balsam poplars - (Populus sect. Tacamahaca)
- Bisabol
- Bdellium
- Benzoin resin
- Bukhoor
- Cabreuva balsam (Myrocarpus frondosus, Myrocarpus fastigatus)
- Camphor
- Canada balsam
- Chinese lacquer (Toxicodendron vernicifluum)
- Copaiba balsam (Copaifera spp.)
- Copal
- Corneiba balsam (Schinus terebinthifolius or Lithraea brasiliensis)
- Damar
- Dragon's blood (Calamus draco)
- Elemi
- Frankincense (Olibanum)
- Galbanum
- Guaiacum officinale
- Guggul
- Gurjun balsam
- Imbauba balsam (Cecropia adenopus)
- Labdanum
- Mastic
- Myrrh
- Obira balsam (Apocynaceae)
- Opopanax
- Umiri balsam (Humiria floribunda)
- Rosin (Colophony)
- Sagapenum
- Sandarac
- Sarcocolla
- Storax balsam
- Turpentine
- Venice turpentine (Larch turpentine) (Larix occidentalis)
- Wallaba balsam (Eperua spp.)

== Safety ==
Some balsams, such as Balsam of Peru, may be associated with allergies. In particular, Euphorbia latex ("wolf's milk") is strongly irritant and is cytotoxic.

== See also ==
- Basamum
