= Ferula erubescens =

Ferula erubescens Boiss. is a nomen confusum based on two specimens of different species:

- Ferula gummosa Boiss. (Type specimen: Aucher-Éloy, #3658)
- Ferula rubricaulis Boiss. (Type specimen: Aucher-Éloy, #4614)
