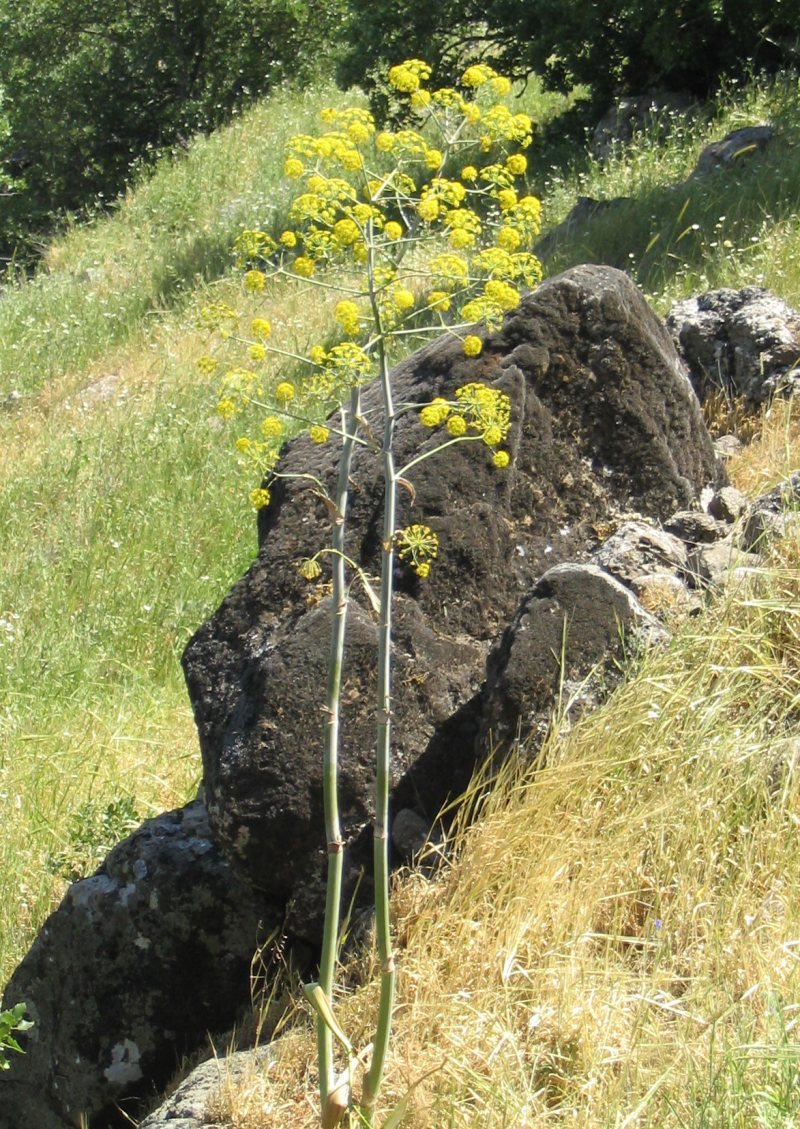
- Ferula communis

Scientific classification
- Kingdom: Plantae
- Clade: Tracheophytes
- Clade: Angiosperms
- Clade: Eudicots
- Clade: Asterids
- Order: Apiales
- Family: Apiaceae
- Subfamily: Apioideae
- Tribe: Scandiceae
- Subtribe: Ferulinae
- Genus: Ferula; L.

Synonyms
- List: Agasulis Raf.; Buniotrinia Stapf & Wettst.; Dardanis Raf.; Diserneston Jaub. & Spach; Dorema D.Don; Eriosynaphe DC.; Euryangium Kauffm.; Merwia B.Fedtsch.; Narthex Falc.; Pinacantha Gilli; Polycyrtus Schltdl.; Schumannia Kuntze; Scorodosma Bunge; Soranthus Ledeb.; Sumbulus H.Reinsch; Talassia Korovin

= Ferula =

Genus of plants

Ferula (from Latin ferula 'rod') is a genus of about 220 species of flowering plants in the family Apiaceae, native to the Mediterranean region east to central Asia, mostly growing in arid climates. Many plants of this genus, especially F. communis, are referred to as "giant fennel", although they are not fennel in the strict sense.

== Description ==
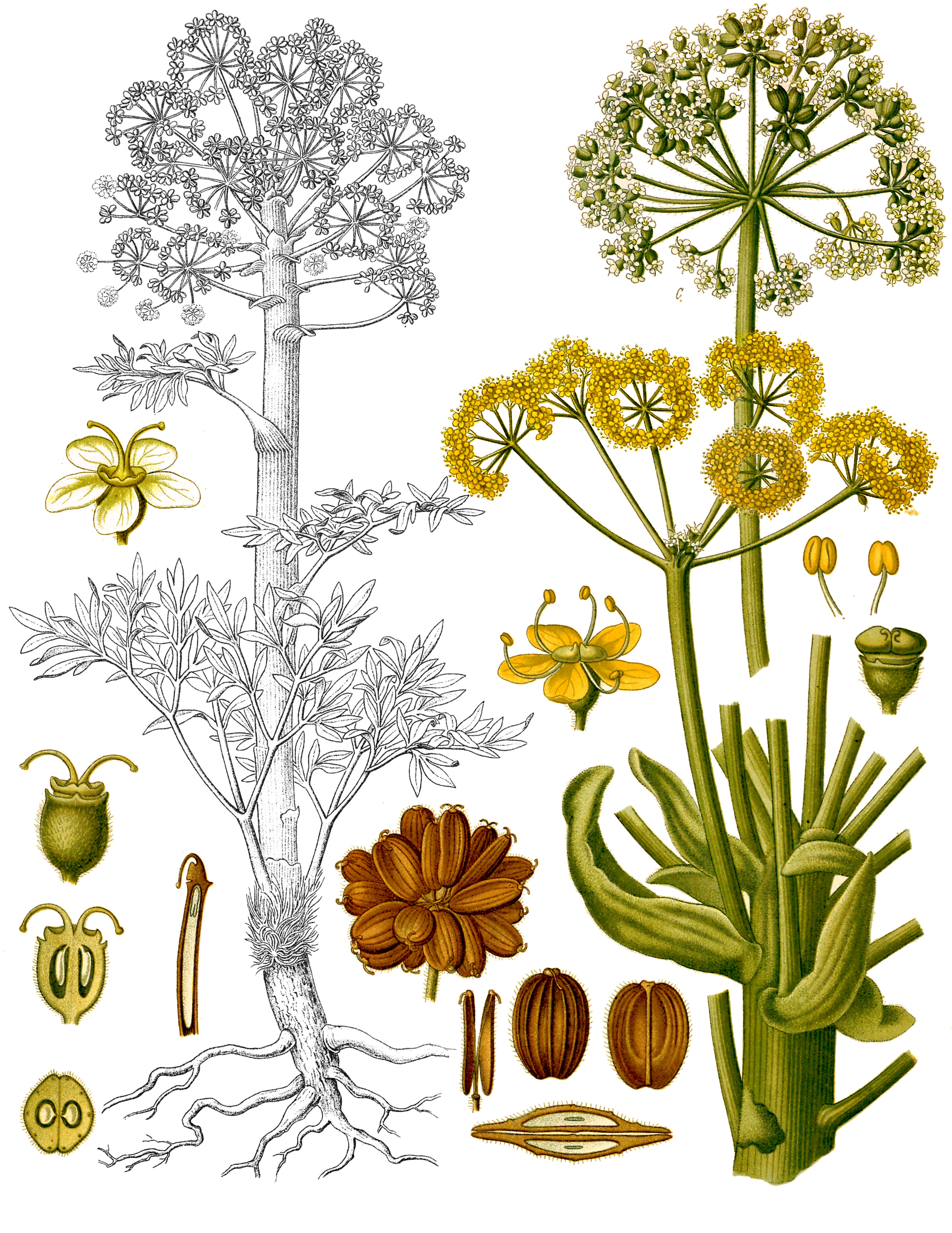
Ferula foetida

They are herbaceous perennial plants growing to 1–4 m tall, with stout, hollow, somewhat succulent stems. The leaves are tripinnate or even more finely divided, with a stout basal sheath clasping the stem. The basal sheaths of Ferula oopoda, for example, are up to 15 cm (6 in) long and form a cup holding about a cup of rainwater. The flowers are usually yellow, rarely white, produced in large umbels.

== Selected species ==
- Ferula assa-foetida – asafoetida
- Ferula aucheri
- Ferula caspica
- Ferula communis – giant fennel
- Ferula conocaula
- Ferula cypria – Cyprus fennel
- Ferula diversivittata
- Ferula drudeana, hypothesized to be the ancient Silphion
- Ferula foetida
- Ferula gummosa, syn. F. galbaniflua – galbanum
- Ferula hermonis
- Ferula iliensis
- Ferula jaeschkeana
- Ferula karelinii
- Ferula linkii
- Ferula longifolia
- Ferula marmarica
- Ferula melitensis
- Ferula mikraskythiana – endemic to Romania and found in the Dumbrăveni Forest Nature Reserve in 2014
- Ferula moschata, syn F. sumbul – muskroot
- Ferula narthex
- Ferula oopoda found in Turkmenistan and Pakistan.
- Ferula orientalis
- Ferula persica
- Ferula rubricaulis
- Ferula sadleriana - endemic to the Pannonian Basin, especially Hungary
- Ferula schair
- Ferula szowitziana
- Ferula tingitana, hypothesized to be the ancient Silphion
- Ferula varia

== Uses ==
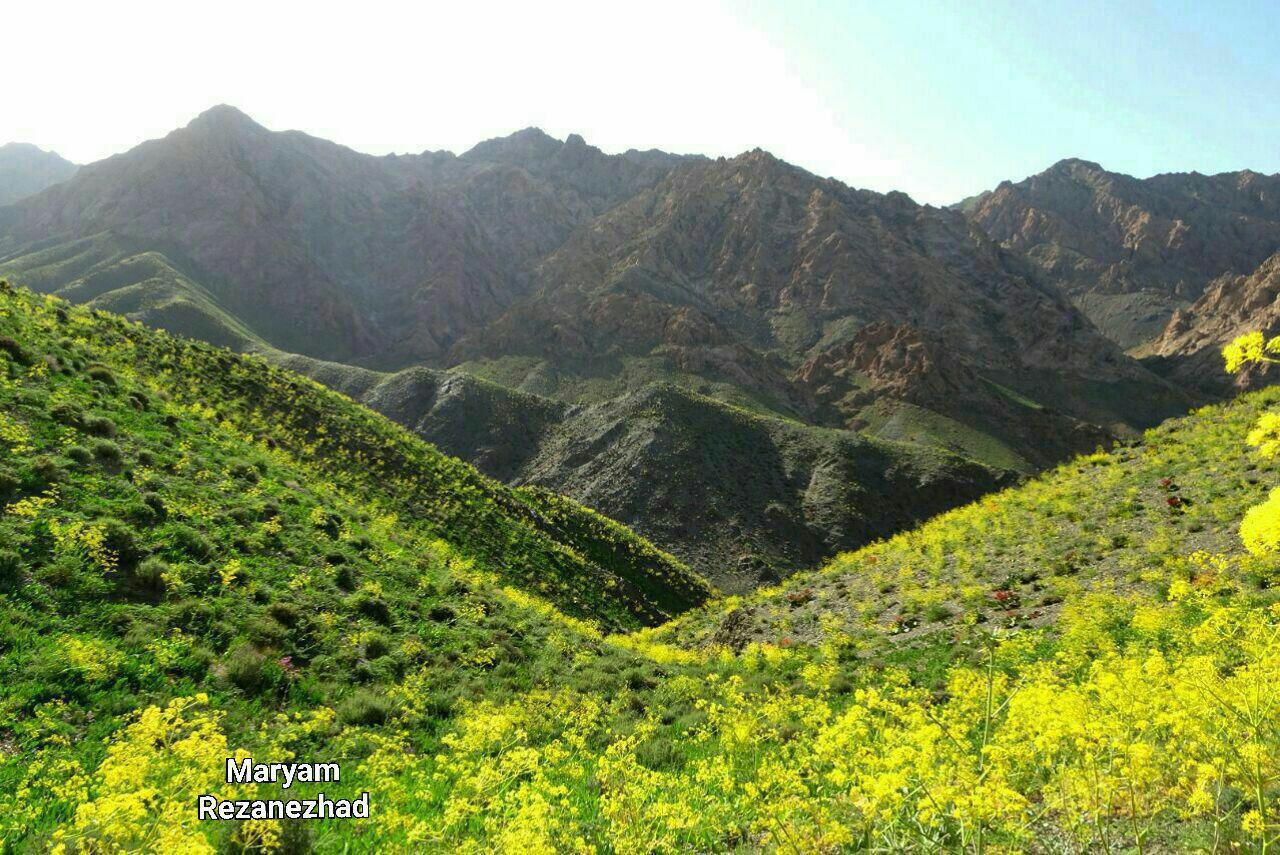
Ferula in Iran

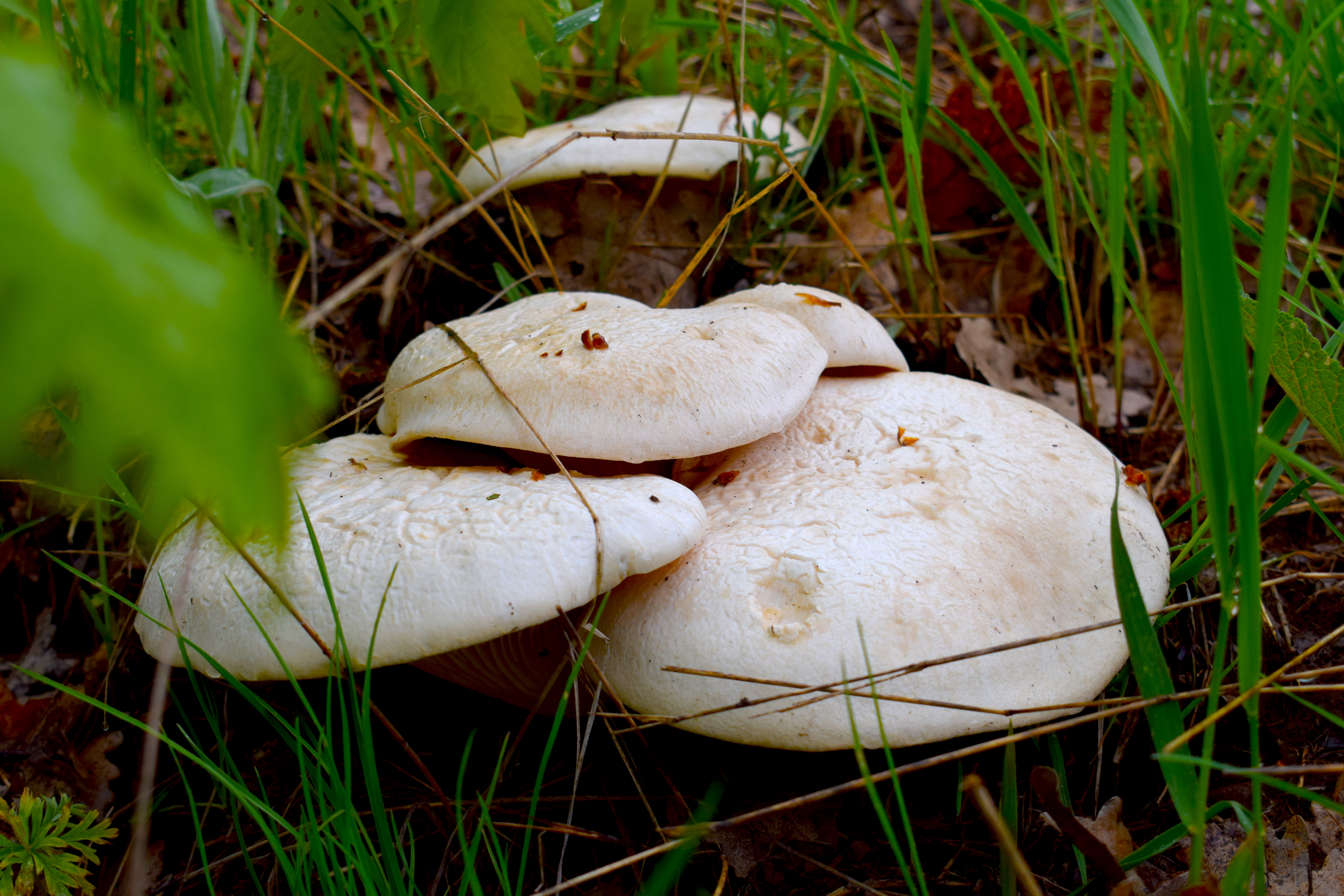
Pleurotus eryngii var. ferulae. Ferula mushroom in Bingöl, Turkey

The Roman spice laserpicium probably came from a species of Ferula, either an extinct one or Ferula tingitana or more recently Ferula drudeana, though other identities have been suggested. The Romans called the hollow light rod made from this plant a ferula (compare also fasces, judicial birches). Such rods were used for walking sticks, splints, for stirring boiling liquids, and for corporal punishment.

The gummy resin of many species of Ferula is used for various purposes:

- Ferula foetida, Ferula assa-foetida and some other species are used to make the spice asafoetida, or hing
- Ferula gummosa makes galbanum
- Ferula hermonis makes zallouh
- Ferula moschata makes sumbul
- Ferula persica or F. szowitziana makes sagapenum
- Ferula marmarica makes "Cyrenaican ammoniacum"
- Ferula ammoniacum makes "Persian ammoniacum"
- Ferula communis subsp. brevifolia makes "Moroccan ammoniacum"
