= Sagapenum =

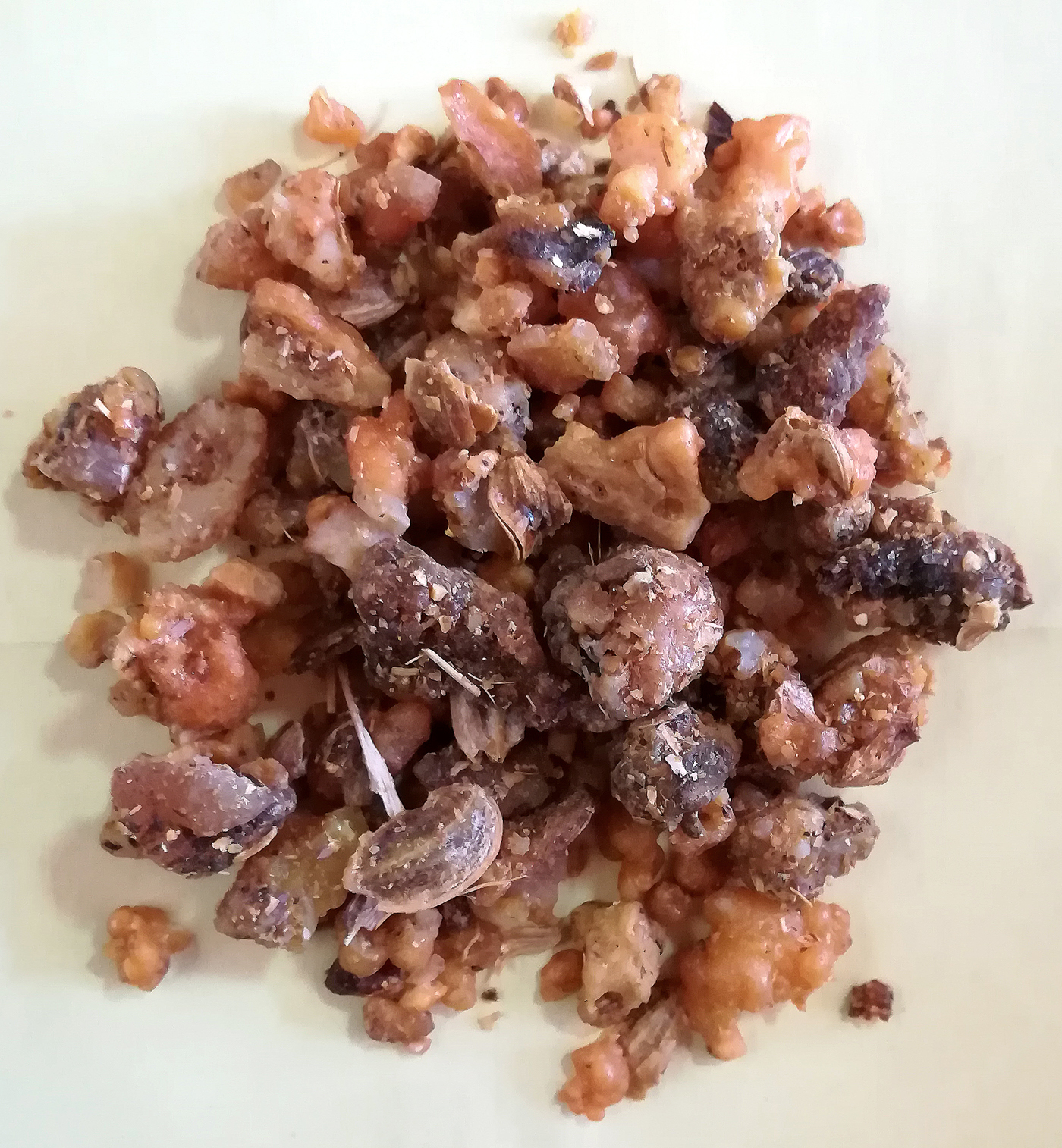
Sagapenum resin

Sagapenum (Greek σᾰγάπηνον, σικβινίτζα (Du Cange), σεραπίων; Arabic sakbīnadj; Latin sagapenum, sagapium, seraphinum (Pharm. Witenbergica)) is a historical plant from Media, identified with Ferula persica and Ferula szowitziana.

== History ==
Pliny (Historia Naturalis 12.126, 19.167, 20.197) holds that sagapenum is similar to ammoniacum, and mentions its use in adultering laser.

According to Dioscorides (De materia medica 3.85, 95), sagapenum smells like silphium and galbanum, and has expectorant, topical, anti-convulsant, and abortifacient properties.
