= Ferula melitensis =

Scientific classification
- Kingdom: Plantae
- Clade: Tracheophytes
- Clade: Angiosperms
- Clade: Eudicots
- Clade: Asterids
- Order: Apiales
- Family: Apiaceae
- Genus: Ferula
- Species: F. melitensis

Binomial name
- Ferula melitensis Brullo, C.Brullo, Cambria, Giusso, Salmeri & Bacch.

Species of plant

Ferula melitensis, the Maltese giant fennel, is a plant species in the family Apiaceae.
