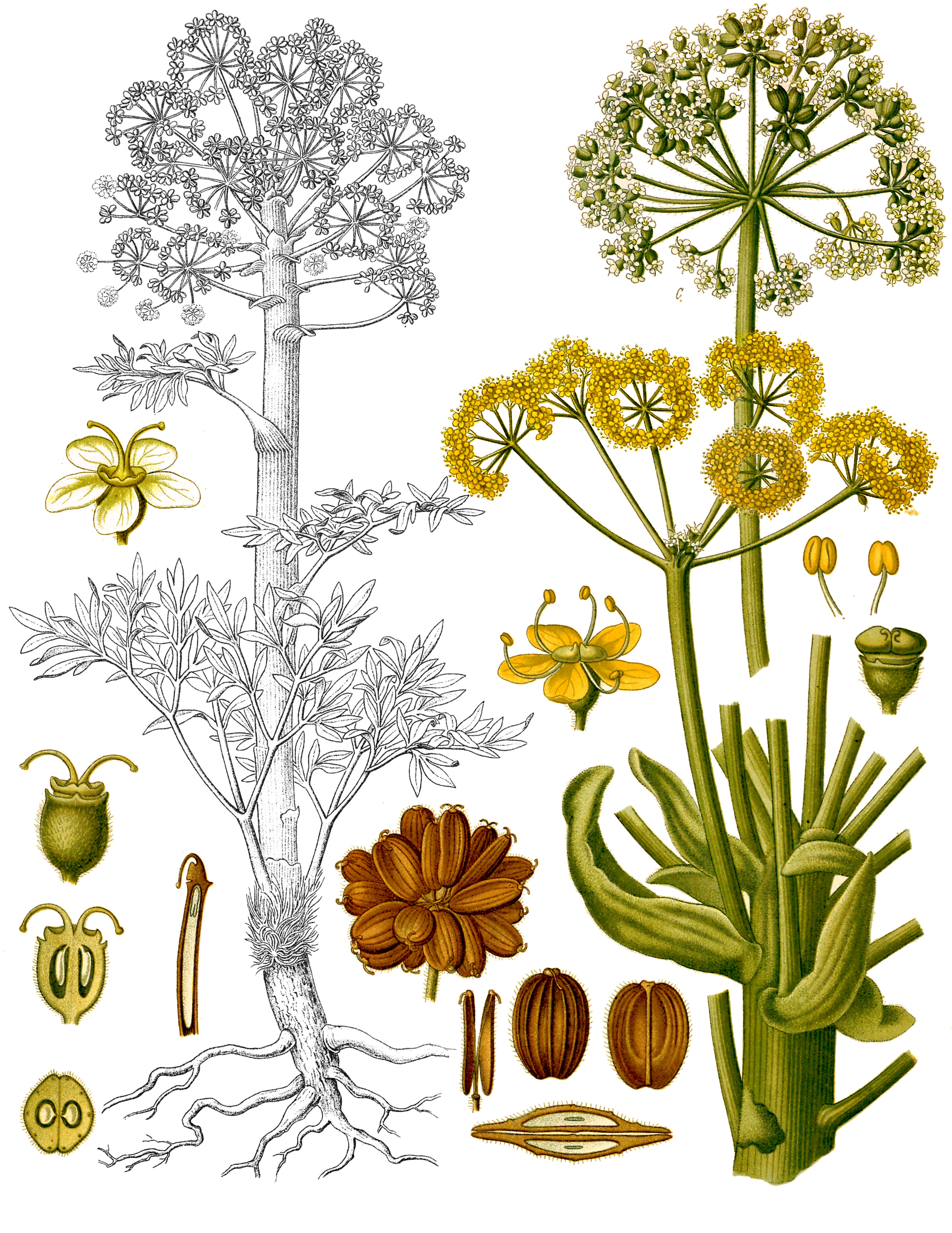

Scientific classification
- Kingdom: Plantae
- Clade: Tracheophytes
- Clade: Angiosperms
- Clade: Eudicots
- Clade: Asterids
- Order: Apiales
- Family: Apiaceae
- Genus: Ferula
- Species: F. foetida

Binomial name
- Ferula foetida (Bunge) Regel
- F. foetida is distributed in the dark and light green parts.

Synonyms
- Ferula scorodosma Bentley & Trimen; Scorodosma foetidum Bunge

= Ferula foetida =

Species of plant

Ferula foetida is a species of Ferula native to Central Asia (Kyzylkum Desert, Karakum Desert, Turkmenistan), Eastern Iran, western Afghanistan and western Pakistan. It is the most widely distributed species that produces asafoetida. It is often mistaken for the Southern Iranian species F. assa-foetida, for example, in Flora of the U.S.S.R. and Flora of Pakistan.

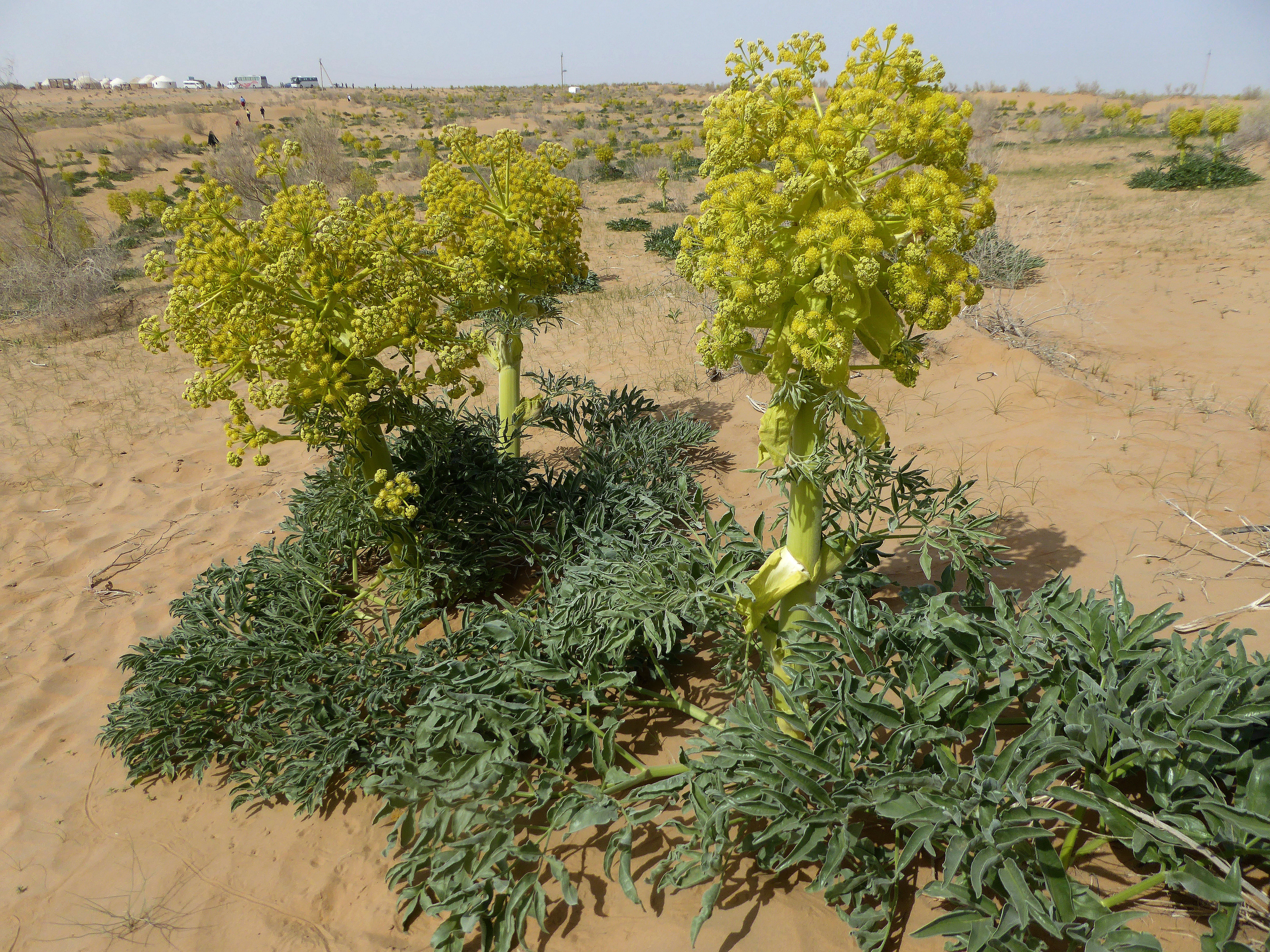
Plants

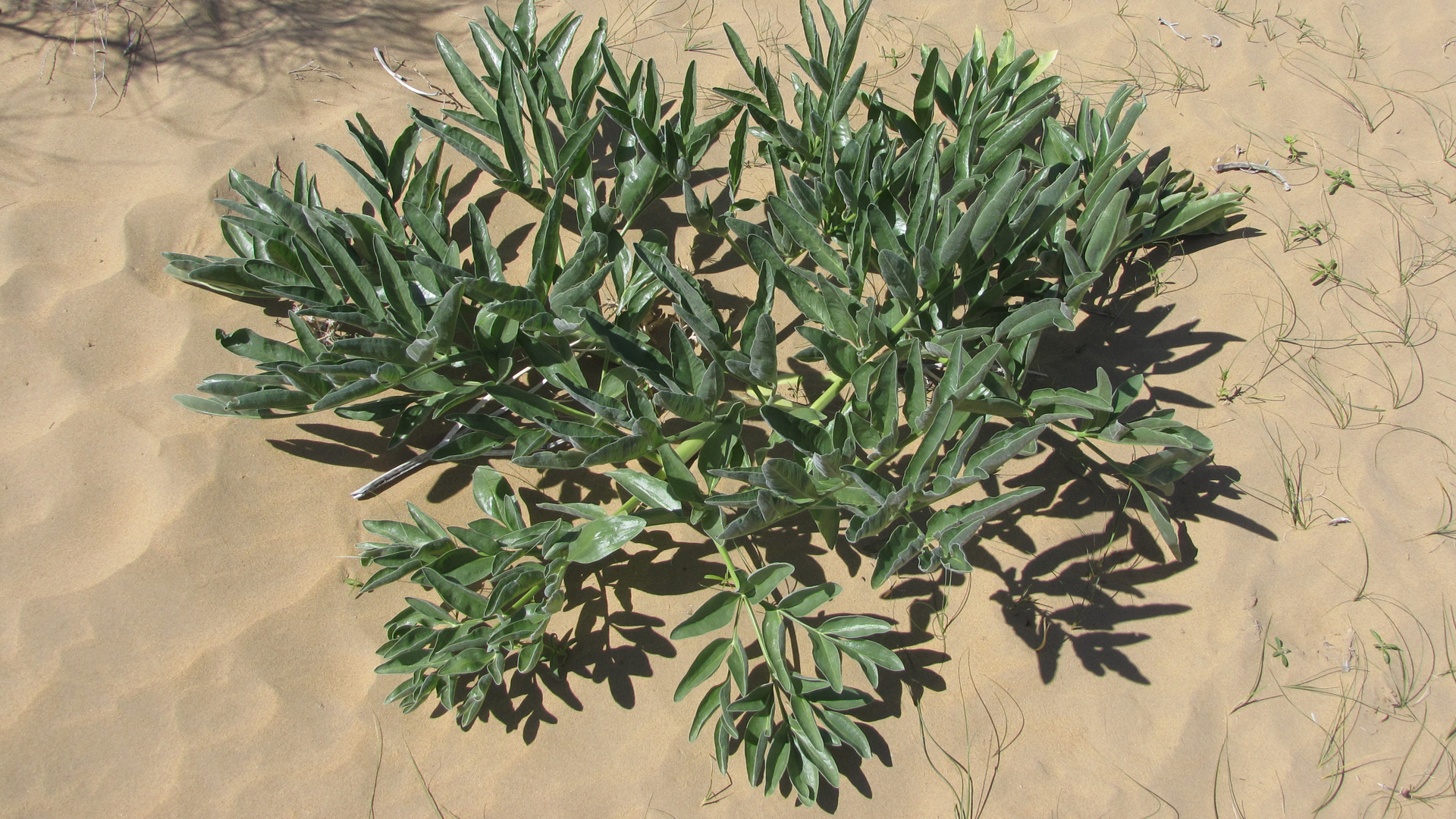
Basal leaves

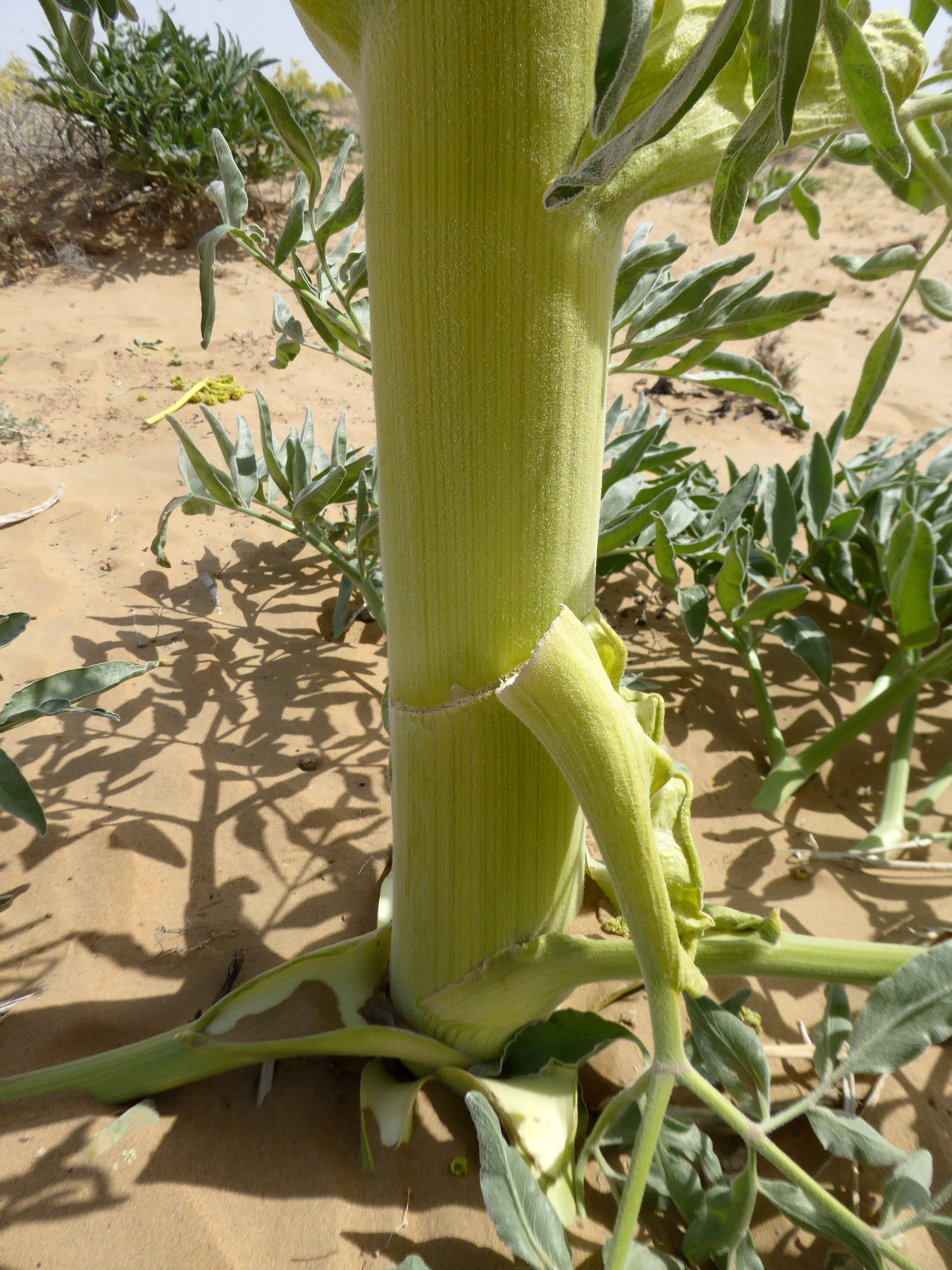
Stem

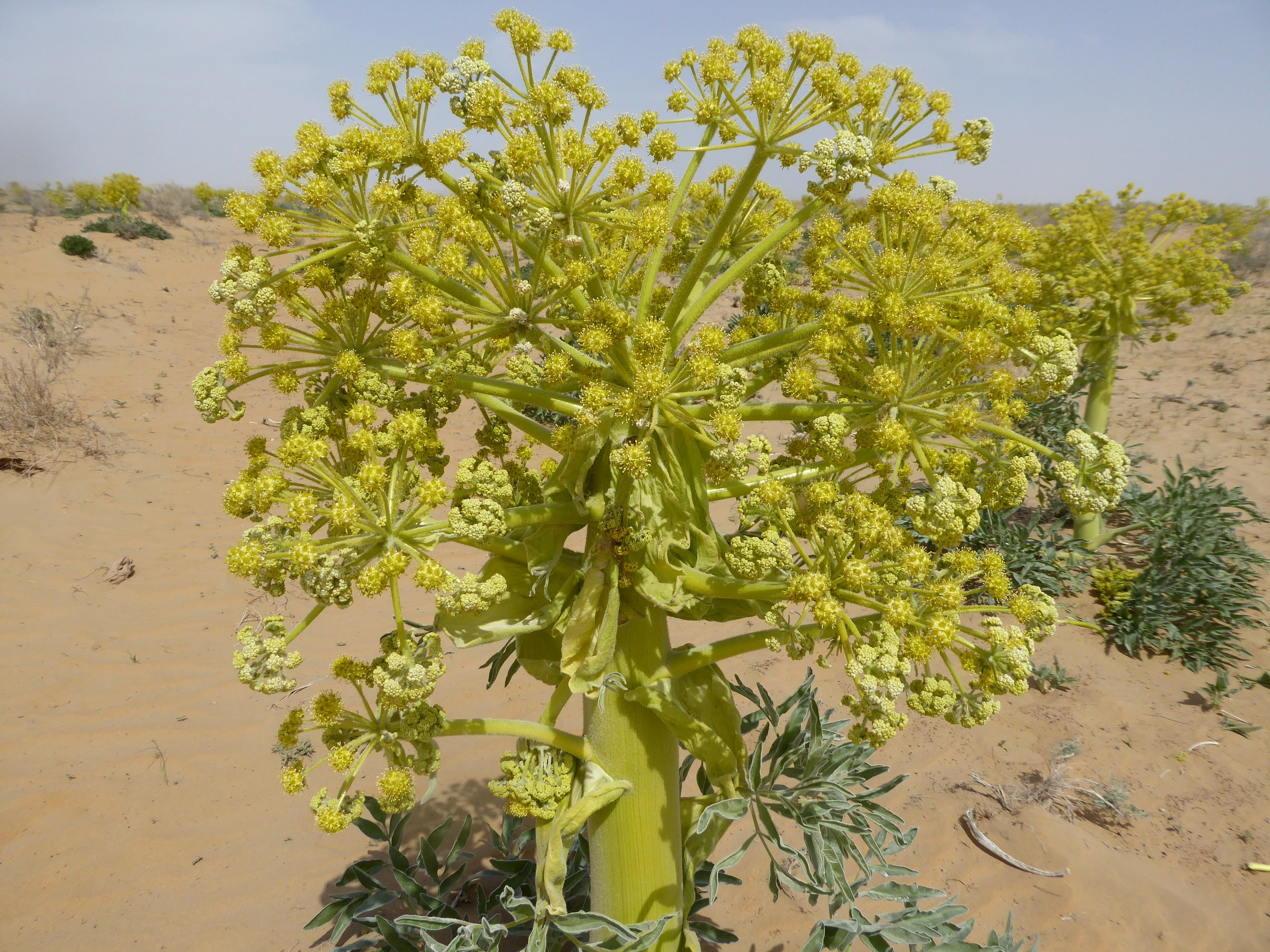
Compound inflorescence

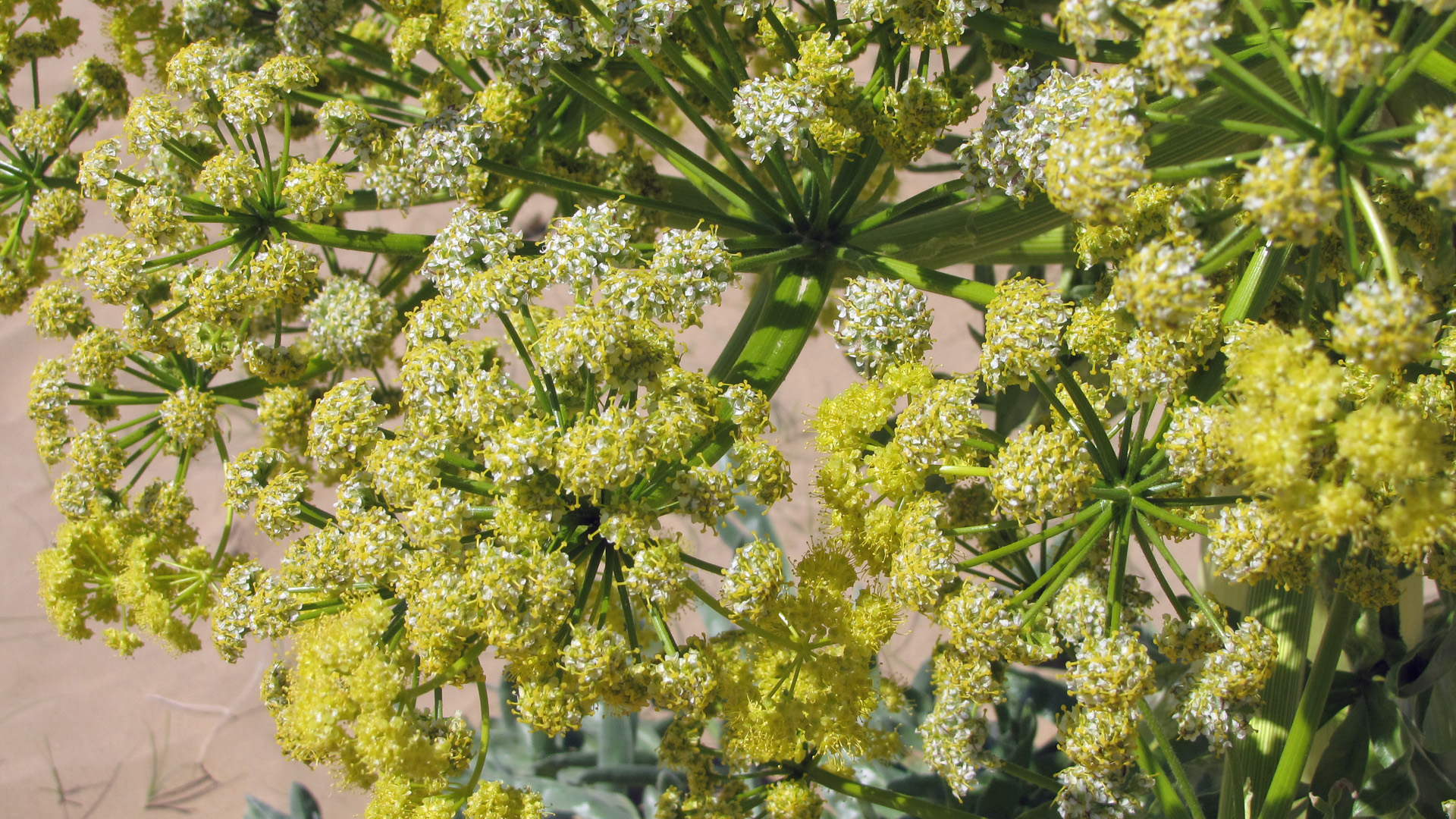
Umbels
