= Ferula cypria =

Scientific classification
- Kingdom: Plantae
- Clade: Tracheophytes
- Clade: Angiosperms
- Clade: Eudicots
- Clade: Asterids
- Order: Apiales
- Family: Apiaceae
- Genus: Ferula
- Species: F. cypria

Binomial name
- Ferula cypria Post

Synonyms
- Ferulago cypria (Post) H.Lindb.

Species of flowering plant

Ferula cypria, the Cyprus fennel, is an erect perennial herb up to 1 m high with sulcate stems. The compound alternate leaves are hairless and 4-pinnate, 25-45 x 20–30 cm, final segments are very small, linear and acute. The inconspicuous yellowish flowers are repeatedly branched in pyramidal inflorescences. Flowers from May to June. The fruit is a dry hairless schizocarp.

== Habitat ==
Dry rocky hillsides mostly on limestone at 200–600 m altitude.

== Distribution ==
It is endemic to Cyprus where it is considered a rare species and seems to be restricted to certain areas in the Pentadaktylos Range-Ayios Ilarionas, Pano Dhikomo, Lefkoniko. It is also found in Philani and Lazanias.
