= Ferula aucheri =

Scientific classification
- Kingdom: Plantae
- Clade: Tracheophytes
- Clade: Angiosperms
- Clade: Eudicots
- Clade: Asterids
- Order: Apiales
- Family: Apiaceae
- Genus: Ferula
- Species: F. aucheri

Binomial name
- Ferula aucheri (Boiss.) Piwczyński, Spalik, M.Panahi & Puchałka

Synonyms
- Dorema aucheri Boiss.; Angelica dura K.Koch; Dorema robustum Lofius ex I.G.Borshch., nom. nud.

Species of flowering plant

Ferula aucheri, synonym Dorema aucheri, is a plant that grows in Iran. In Persian it is called بیلهر (Bilhar). It is the first umbelliferous plant found to produce exudate flavonoids.

It grows in the mountains of western of Iran (Sedeh and Kermanshah). In Persian it is called كندل كوهي (kandale kohi) and in Kermanshah it is known as زو (zo).

Harvested traditionally for cooking, the young leaves and branches of Ferula aucheri are typically used to make a famous pickle known as "Bilhar pickle" or used as vegetables in soup. It can also be cooked by steaming and served with butter as a meal.

Ferula aucheri is used in parts of Iran as traditional medicine, believed to have uses as a stimulant, nervonic, antispasmodic, bronchodilator, expectorant, kidney stone repellent, emmenagogue and analgesic for visceral pain.

Excessive harvesting of these plants for both cooking and traditional medicine has led it to become endangered in local provinces.

Despite being used in both cooking and traditional Iranian medicine, Ferula aucheri has been shown to have hepatotoxic effects when extract of the plant has been injected into albino mice, causing necrosis, inflammation of the liver tissue, cell proliferation, cholestasis, and increases in release of the liver enzymes ALP, ALT (SGPT) and AST (SGOT).
