= Ferula hermonis =

Scientific classification
- Kingdom: Plantae
- Clade: Tracheophytes
- Clade: Angiosperms
- Clade: Eudicots
- Clade: Asterids
- Order: Apiales
- Family: Apiaceae
- Genus: Ferula
- Species: F. hermonis

Binomial name
- Ferula hermonis Boiss.

Species of plant

Ferula hermonis is a species of flowering plant in the Apiaceae family. It is native to Lebanon, Syria and Turkey. The epithet hermonis refers to Mount Hermon on the border between Syria, Israel and Lebanon.

Common names include zallouh (Arabic: زلّوع) and Lebanese viagra. The latter name alludes to the traditional use of the roots of this plant as a purported aphrodisiac.
