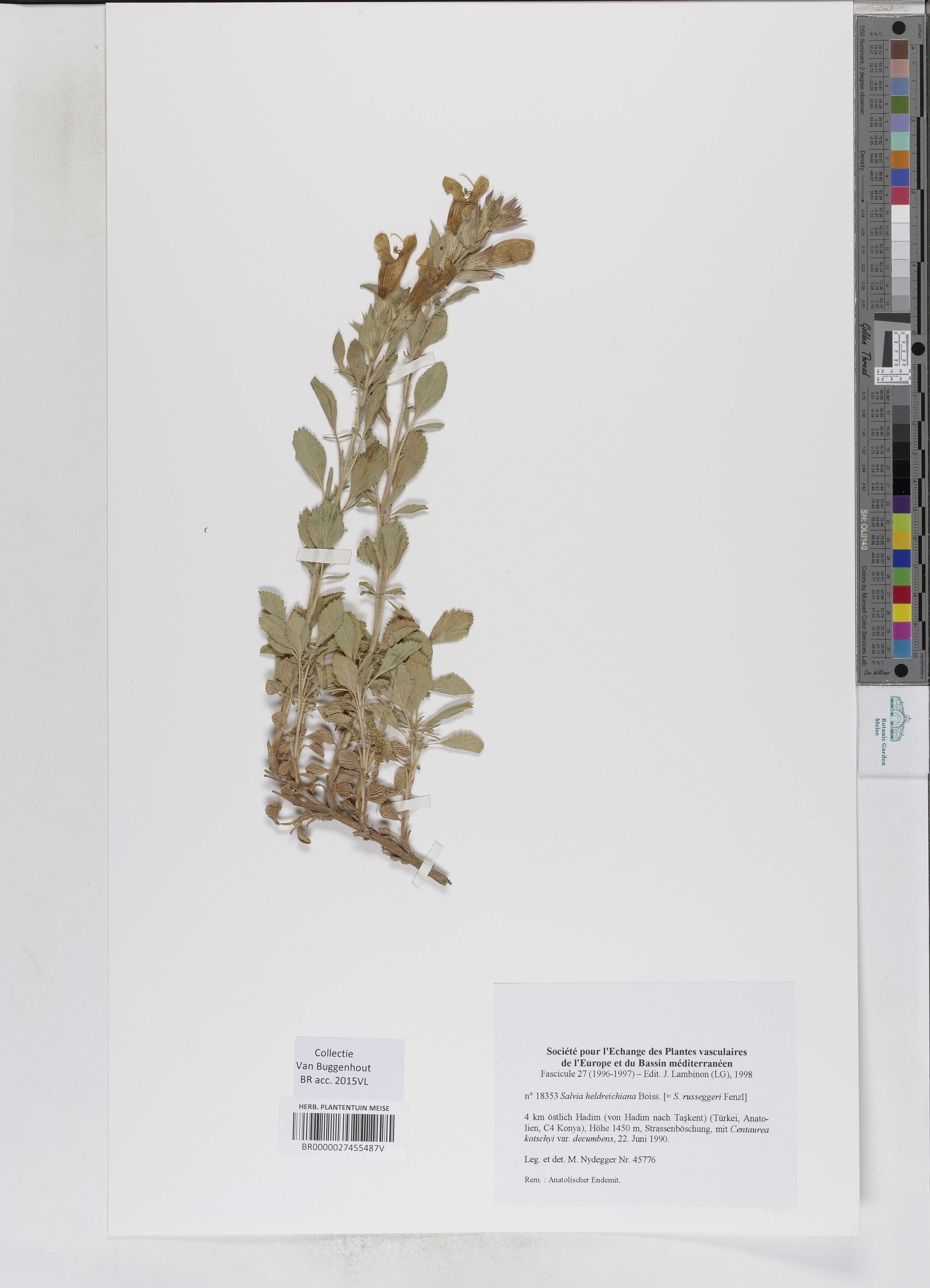

Scientific classification
- Kingdom: Plantae
- Clade: Tracheophytes
- Clade: Angiosperms
- Clade: Eudicots
- Clade: Asterids
- Order: Lamiales
- Family: Lamiaceae
- Genus: Salvia
- Species: S. heldreichiana

Binomial name
- Salvia heldreichiana Boiss. ex A.DC.

Synonyms
- Salvia brevispicata P.H.Davis; Salvia russeggeri Fenzl ex Tchich.

= Salvia heldreichiana =

Species of plant in the mint family

Salvia heldreichiana is species of flowering plant in the family Lamiaceae. It is a bushy perennial, endemic to Turkey and rarely seen in cultivation.
