= Ferula mikraskythiana =

Scientific classification
- Kingdom: Plantae
- Clade: Tracheophytes
- Clade: Angiosperms
- Clade: Eudicots
- Clade: Asterids
- Order: Apiales
- Family: Apiaceae
- Genus: Ferula
- Species: F. mikraskythiana

Binomial name
- Ferula mikraskythiana Mátis, A.Z.Szabó & L.Bartha, 2017

Species of flowering plant

Ferula mikraskythiana is a species of flowering plant in the family Apiaceae. It is native to Dobrogea in Romania.
