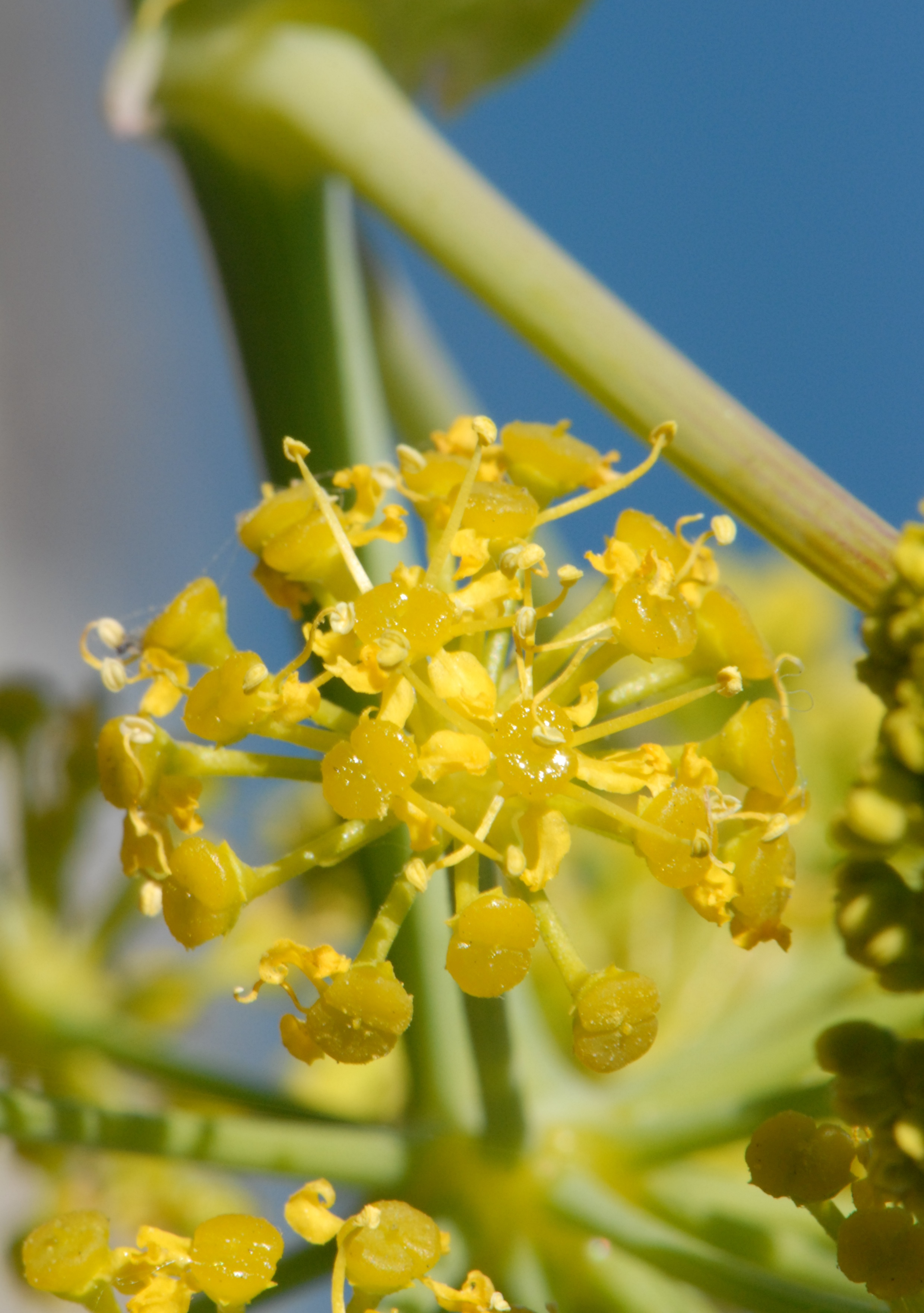

Scientific classification
- Kingdom: Plantae
- Clade: Tracheophytes
- Clade: Angiosperms
- Clade: Eudicots
- Clade: Asterids
- Order: Apiales
- Family: Apiaceae
- Genus: Ferula
- Species: F. tingitana

Binomial name
- Ferula tingitana L.

= Ferula tingitana =

Giant Tangier fennel

Species of flowering plant

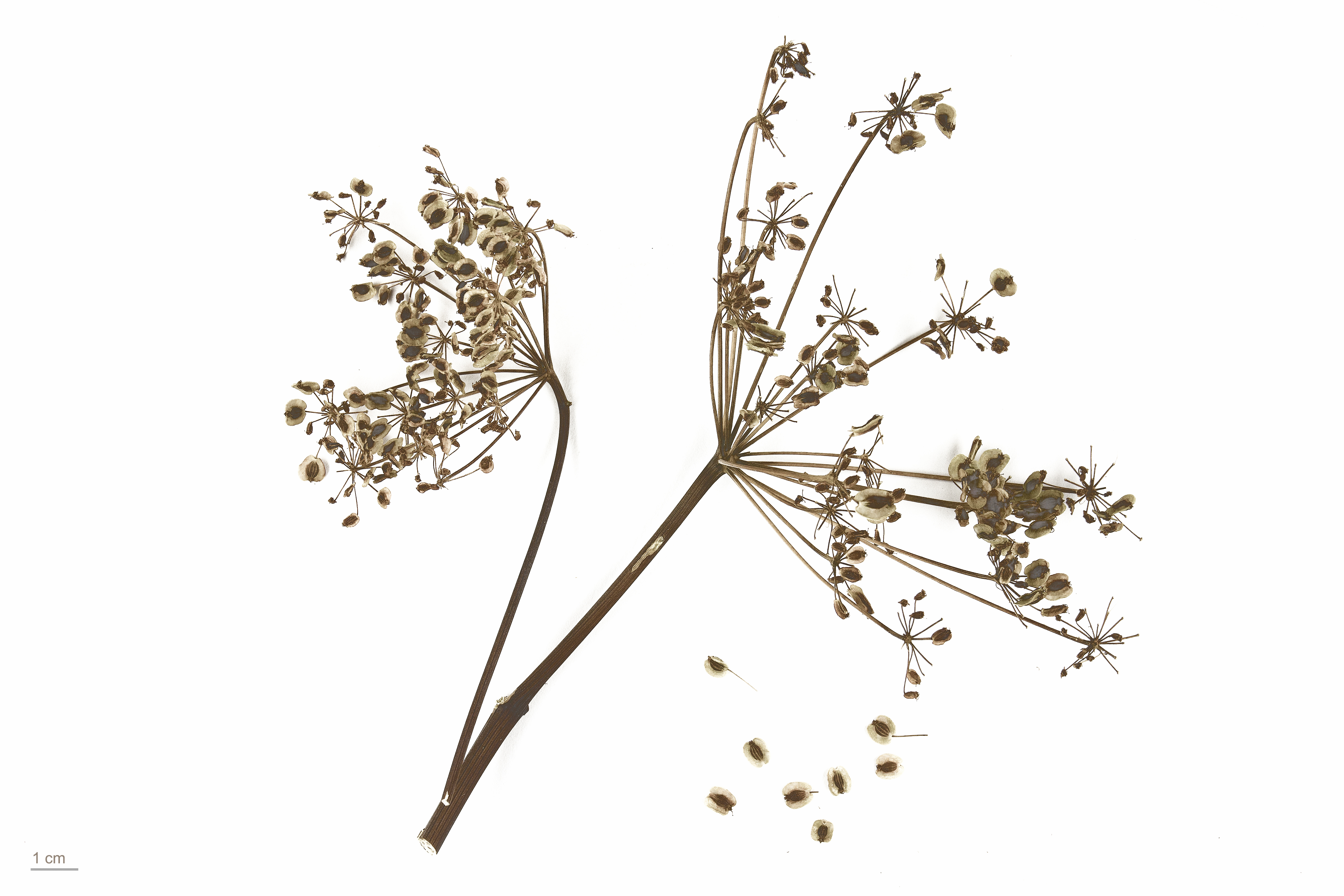
Ferula tingitana (MHNT)

Ferula tingitana, the giant Tangier fennel, is a species of the Apiaceae genus Ferula. Despite the name, the plant is not a type of fennel proper, which belongs to another genus (Foeniculum).

Ferula tingitana is a tall perennial herb. It has alternate leaf arrangement and yellow, unisexual flowers which, like other Apiaceae, grow in umbels. It grows in scrubland (batha and phrygana) and rocky areas. Its range is the Mediterranean coast, in Spain, Morocco, Lebanon, Syria, Israel, Cyprus, and Turkey. In the 1980s there was chemical interest in esters and ethers extracted from it.

This species has been considered to have abortive and menstruation-inducing properties. The species has been suggested as a possible identity for the controversial silphium, a plant used as a spice and for various medical purposes in classical antiquity in the Mediterranean region. Among the many uses of silphium was promoting menstruation, and possibly contraceptive or abortifacient properties, which has been suggested to link it to Ferula.
