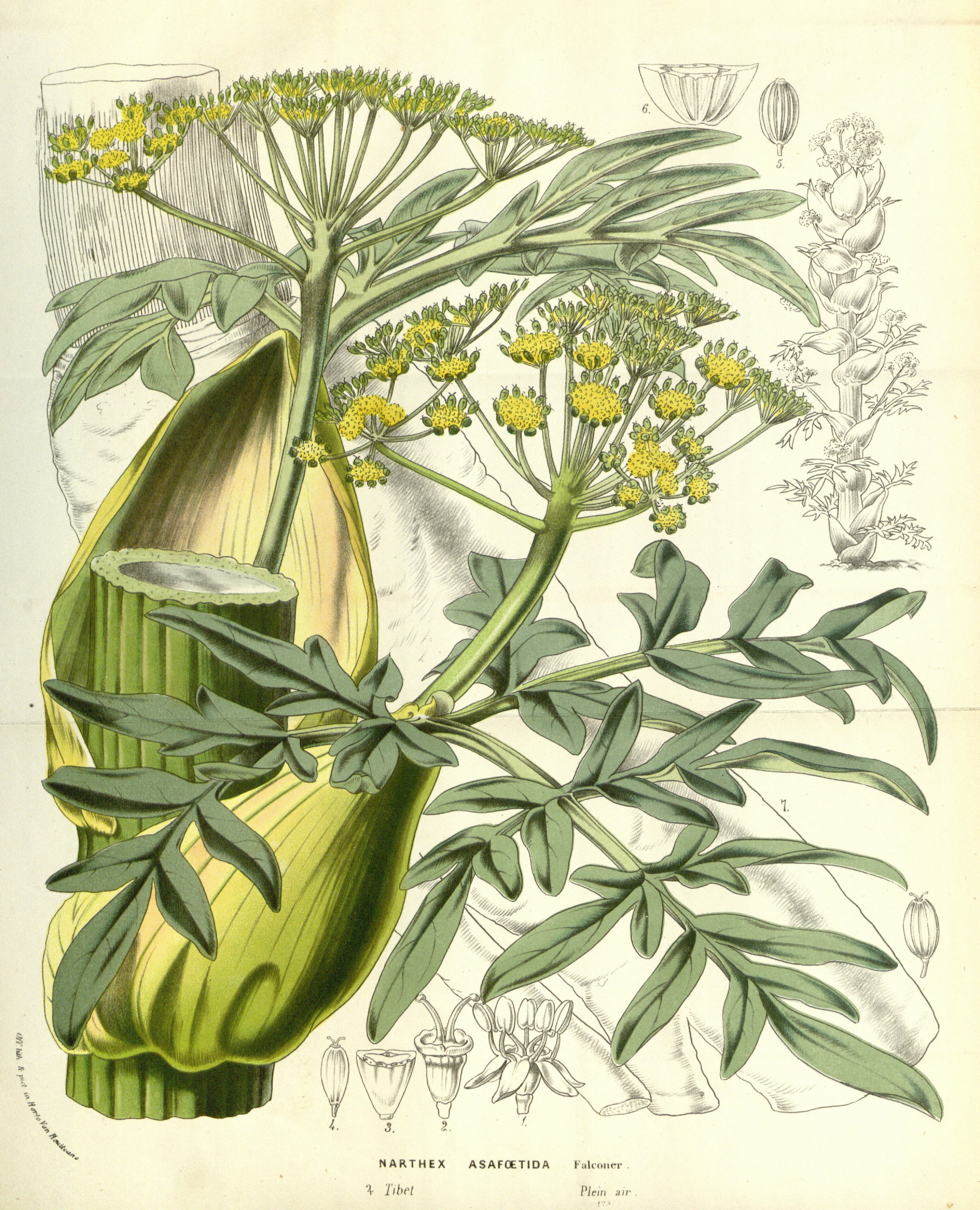

Conservation status
- Least Concern (IUCN 3.1)

Scientific classification
- Kingdom: Plantae
- Clade: Tracheophytes
- Clade: Angiosperms
- Clade: Eudicots
- Clade: Asterids
- Order: Apiales
- Family: Apiaceae
- Genus: Ferula
- Species: F. narthex

Binomial name
- Ferula narthex Boiss.

Synonyms
- Ferula asafoetida (Falc.) H.Karst.; Ferula jaeschkeana subsp. taenioloba Rech. fil. & Riedl; Ferula koelzii Rech.f. & Riedl; Narthex asafoetida Falc.; Peucedanum narthex (Boiss.) Baill.

= Ferula narthex =

Species of flowering plant

Ferula narthex is a species of plant native to Afghanistan, Tajikistan, northern Pakistan and Kashmir. Hugh Falconer noted that this was the source of asafoetida in Central Asia. Although it is often listed as the source of asafoetida, one report stated that its essential oil lacked sulfur-containing compounds which are characteristic of asafoetida.
