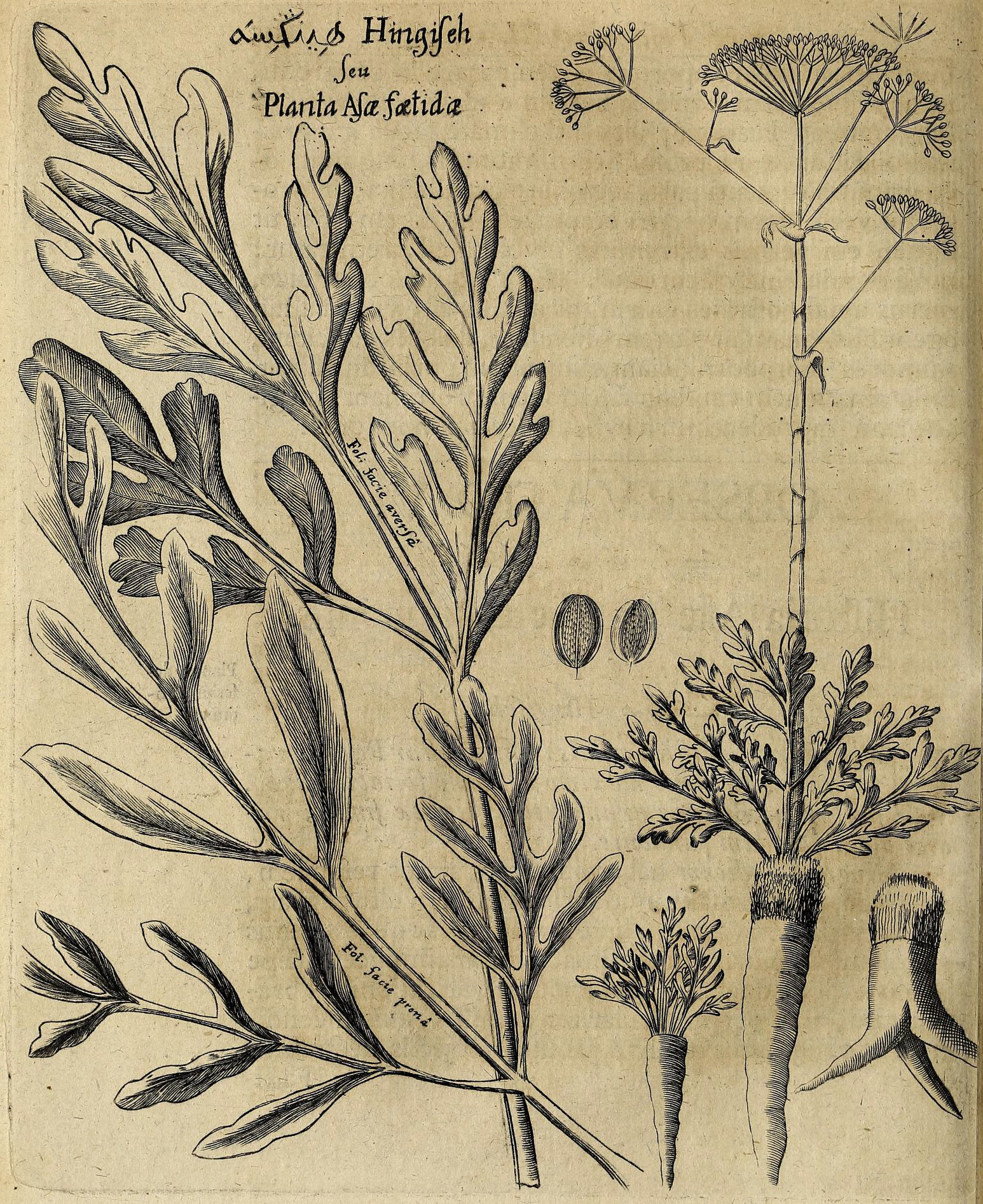
- The first botanical illustration of Ferula assa-foetida (1712)

Scientific classification
- Kingdom: Plantae
- Clade: Embryophytes
- Clade: Tracheophytes
- Clade: Spermatophytes
- Clade: Angiosperms
- Clade: Eudicots
- Clade: Asterids
- Order: Apiales
- Family: Apiaceae
- Genus: Ferula
- Species: F. assa-foetida

Binomial name
- Ferula assa-foetida L.

Synonyms
- Ferula foetida St.-Lag.; Narthex polakii Stapf; Narthex silphium Oerst.; Peucedanum assa-foetida (L.) Baill.; Peucedanum hooshee (Lindl. ex Descourt.) Baill.; Scorodosma assa-foetida (L.) H.Karst.

= Ferula assa-foetida =

Species of flowering plant in the celery family

Ferula assa-foetida is a species of Ferula endemic to Southern Iran. It is a source of asafoetida, but not the main source, although many sources claim so. The production of asafoetida from this species is confined to Southern Iran, especially the area near Lar.

Outside its native range, other asafoetida-producing species are often misidentified as F. assa-foetida. For example, F. foetida is mistaken for F. assa-foetida in Flora of the U.S.S.R. and Flora of Pakistan. In a molecular phylogenetic study, all the plant samples of F. assa-foetida collected in Central Iran were not the true species, but F. alliacea and F. gabrielii or their close relatives instead. Chemical analyses of asafoetida samples obtained from local markets in Eastern Iran also showed that asafoetida-producing species there were F. lutensis, F. foetida, F. alliacea, etc., instead of F. assa-foetida.

F. pseudalliacea and F. rubricaulis are endemic to western and southwestern Iran and are sometimes considered conspecific with F. assa-foetida.
