= Galbanum =

Gum resin

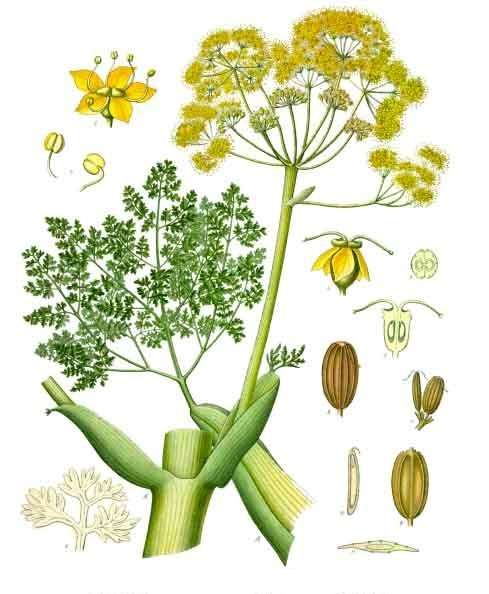
Ferula gummosa, from which galbanum comes.

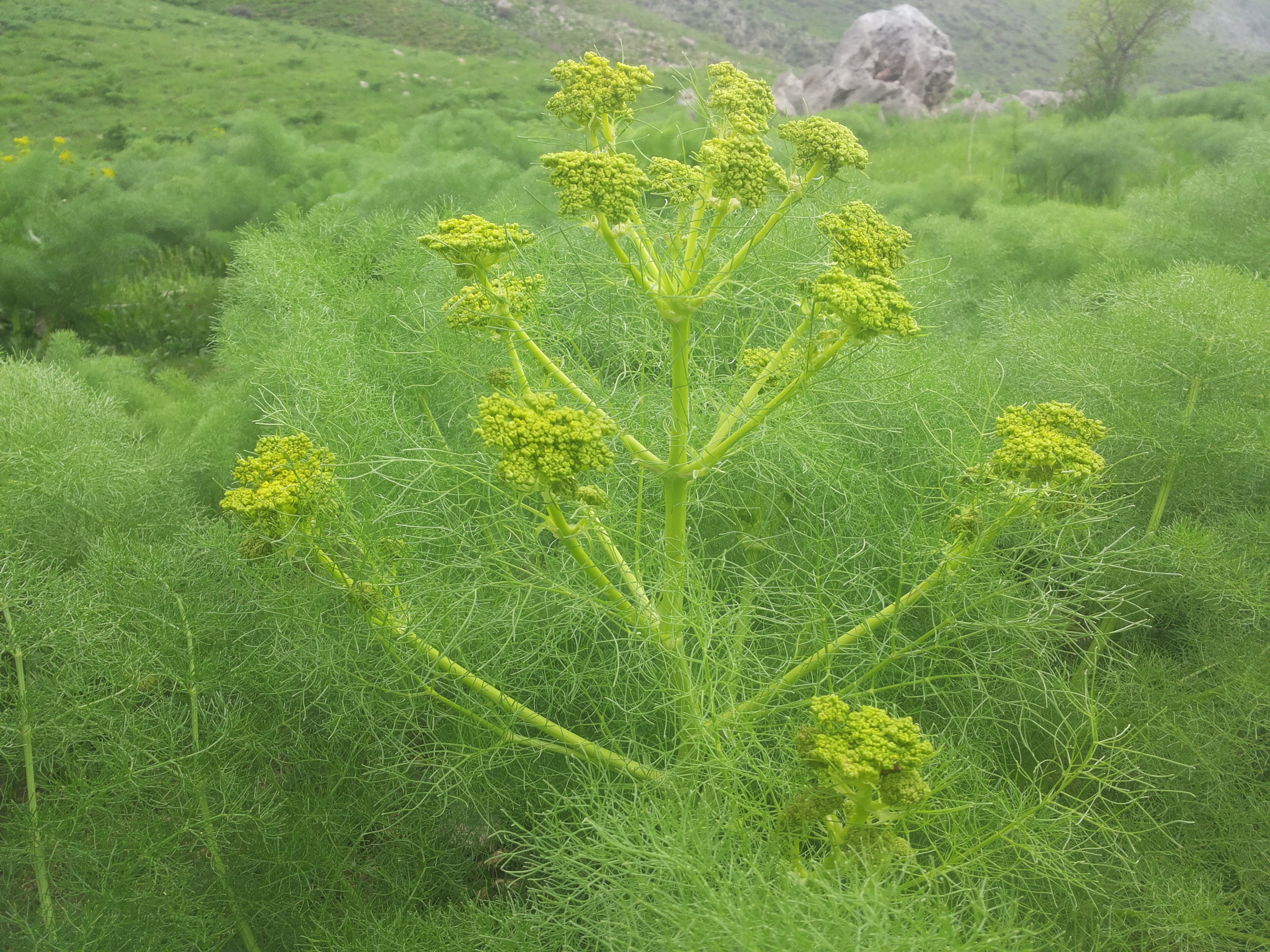
Galbanum flowers, Kurdistan mountains, Hewraman.

Galbanum is an aromatic gum resin and a product of certain umbelliferous Persian plant species in the genus Ferula, chiefly Ferula gummosa (synonym F. galbaniflua) and Ferula rubricaulis. Galbanum-yielding plants grow plentifully on the slopes of the mountain ranges of northern Iran. It occurs usually in hard or soft, irregular, more or less translucent and shining lumps, or occasionally in separate tears, of a light-brown, yellowish or greenish-yellow colour. Galbanum has a disagreeable, bitter taste, a peculiar, somewhat musky odour, and an intense green scent. With a specific gravity of 1.212, it contains about 8% terpenes; about 65% of a resin which contains sulfur; about 20% gum; and a very small quantity of the colorless crystalline substance umbelliferone. It also contains α-pinene, β-pinene, limonene, cadinene, 3-carene, and ocimene.

== Uses ==
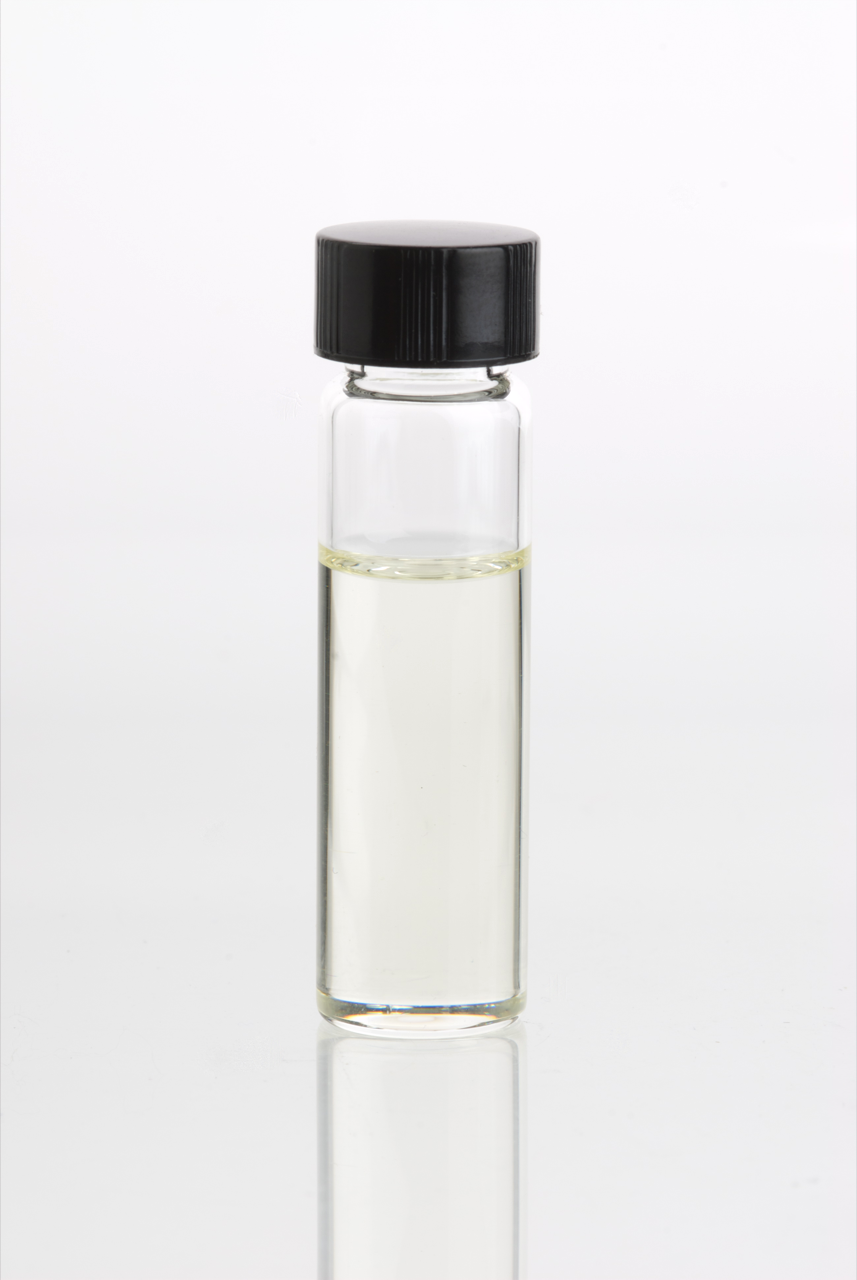
Galbanum (Ferula gummosa) essential oil in clear glass vial

=== Biblical use ===
In the Book of Exodus 30:34, it is mentioned as being used in the making of the Ketoret which is used when referring to the consecrated incense described in the Hebrew Bible and Talmud. It was offered on the specialized incense altar in the time when the Tabernacle was located in the First and Second Jerusalem Temples. The ketoret was an important component of the Temple service in Jerusalem. Rashi (1040–1105) comments on this passage that galbanum is bitter and was included in the incense as a reminder of deliberate and unrepentant sinners. The incense formula was apparently ground small or into a powder. This would be possible because Galbanum, which is a sticky tar-like resin, can be made into a powder by drying, low boiling, or adding a diluent.

=== Perfumes and scents ===
Galbanum was highly treasured as a sacred substance by the ancient Egyptians. The "green" incense of Egyptian antiquity is believed to have been galbanum. Galbanum resin has an intense green scent accompanied by a turpentine odor. The initial notes are a very bitter, acrid, and peculiar scent followed by a complex green, spicy, woody, balsam-like fragrance. When diluted the scent of galbanum has variously been described as reminiscent of pine (due to the pinene and limonene content), evergreen, green bamboo, parsley, green apples, musk, or simply intense green. The oil has a pine like topnote which is less pronounced in the odor of the resinoid. The latter, in turn, has a more woody balsamic, conifer resinous character. Galbanum is frequently adulterated with pine oil.

It is occasionally used in the making of modern perfume, and is the ingredient which gives the distinctive smell to the fragrances "Must" by Cartier, "Vent Vert" by Balmain, "Chanel No. 19", "Vol De Nuit" by Guerlain, "Quelques Fleurs" by Houbigant, as well as Silver Mountain Water by Creed, the esteemed scent of James Gandolfini used during the filming of the sixth season of The Sopranos. The debut of galbanum in fine modern perfumery is generally thought to be the origin of the "Green" family of scents, exemplified by the scent "Vent Vert" first launched by Balmain in 1945. Galbanum absolute is a brown viscous liquid which will easily resinify over time even with minimal exposure to air obtained by solvent-extraction from the gum oleo-resin of the plant. Its odour profile is described as ambery-green, sweet, balsamic, resinous with hints of freshness, "similar to how galbanum oil would smell when mixed with labdanum". It acts as a base note in perfume compositions – one of a handful of green base notes of natural origin. Because it is perceived as simultaneously 'green' and sweet, it finds a more specific role to create a special effect in 'Chypre green', 'floral green', 'Chypre coniferous', 'Woody Fougères' and 'Aquatic Fougères'.

=== Medicinal use ===
Hippocrates employed it in medicine, and Pliny (Nat. Hist. xxiv. 13) ascribes to it extraordinary curative powers, concluding his account of it with the assertion that "the very touch of it mixed with oil of spondylium is sufficient to kill a serpent." The drug was occasionally given in more contemporary medicine, in doses of from five to fifteen grains. It has the actions "common to substances containing a resin and a volatile oil". In traditional Persian medicine, galbanum was used in preparations intended for respiratory complaints, digestive disorders, and topical applications. Its use is now obsolete.

=== Other uses ===
The Latin name ferula derives in part from Ferule which is a schoolmaster's rod, such as a cane, stick, or flat piece of wood, used in punishing children.

A ferula called narthex (or Giant fennel), which shares the galbanum-like scent, has long, straight and sturdy hollow stalks, which are segmented like bamboo. They were used as torches in antiquity and it is with such a torch that, according to Greek mythology, Prometheus, who deceived his father stealing some of his fire, brought fire to humanity. Bacchae were described using the bamboo-like stalks as weapons. Such rods were also used for walking sticks, splints, for stirring boiling liquids, and for corporal punishment.

Some of the mythology may have transferred to the related galbanum which was referred to as the sacred "mother resin."

In 1858, Lola Montez recommended using a mixture of galbanum (which she spelled "gaulbanum") and pitch plaster attached to a leather strip as a tool for removing hair from body parts where more visible hair might be unwanted, similar to modern day 'waxing'.
