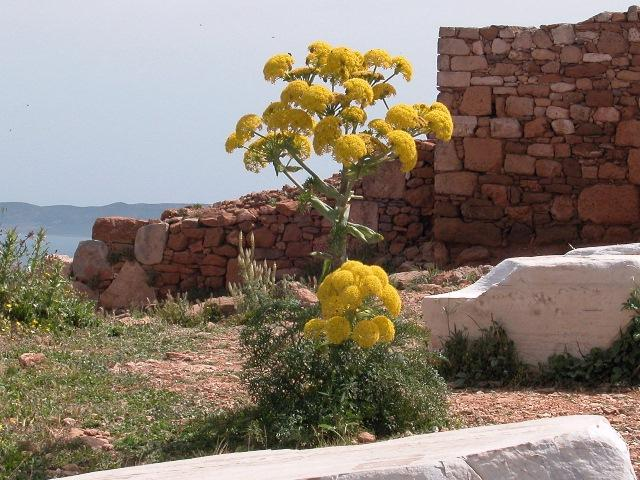

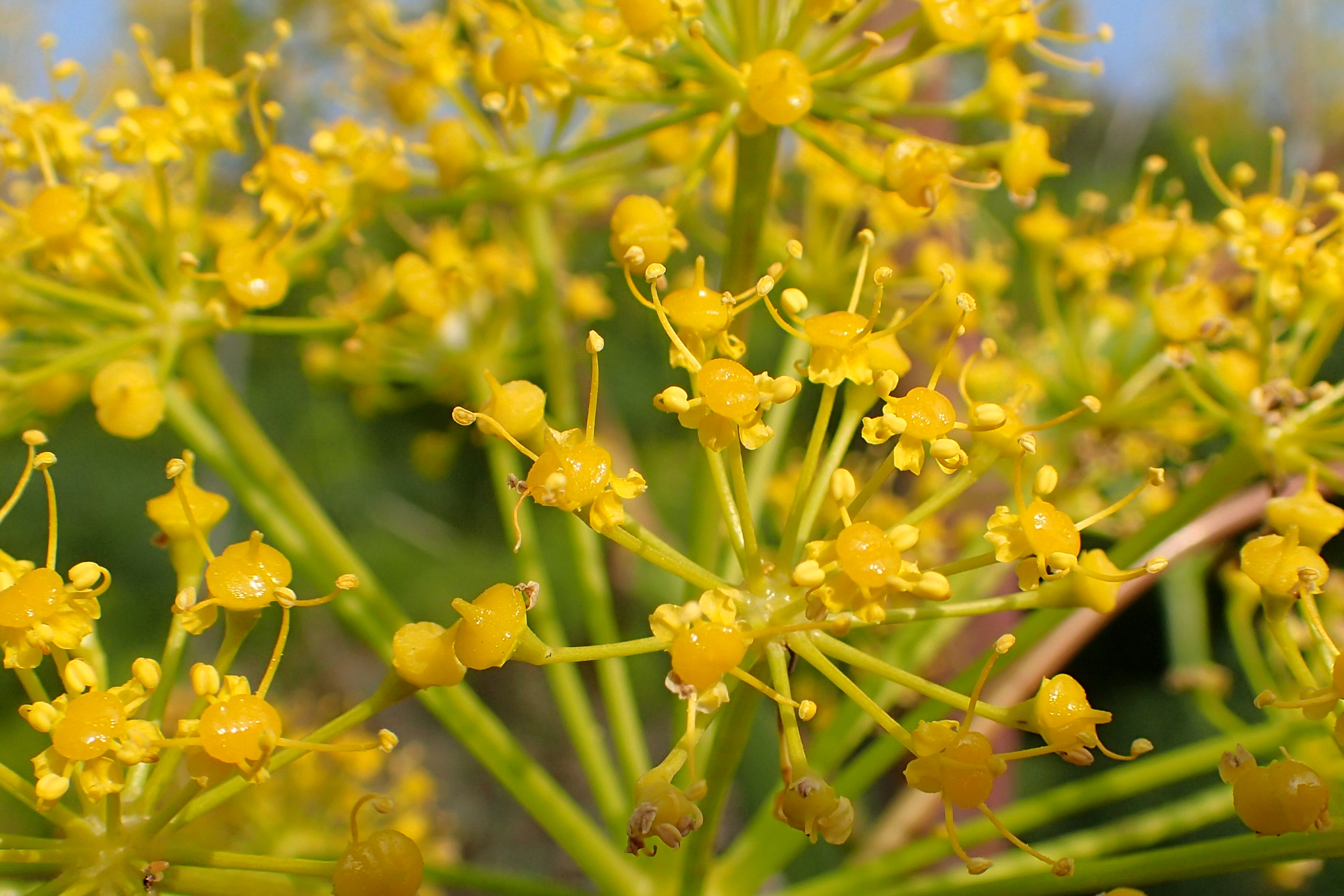

Conservation status
- Least Concern (IUCN 3.1)

Scientific classification
- Kingdom: Plantae
- Clade: Tracheophytes
- Clade: Angiosperms
- Clade: Eudicots
- Clade: Asterids
- Order: Apiales
- Family: Apiaceae
- Genus: Ferula
- Species: F. communis

Binomial name
- Ferula communis L.

= Ferula communis =

Giant fennel

Species of flowering plant in the carrot family

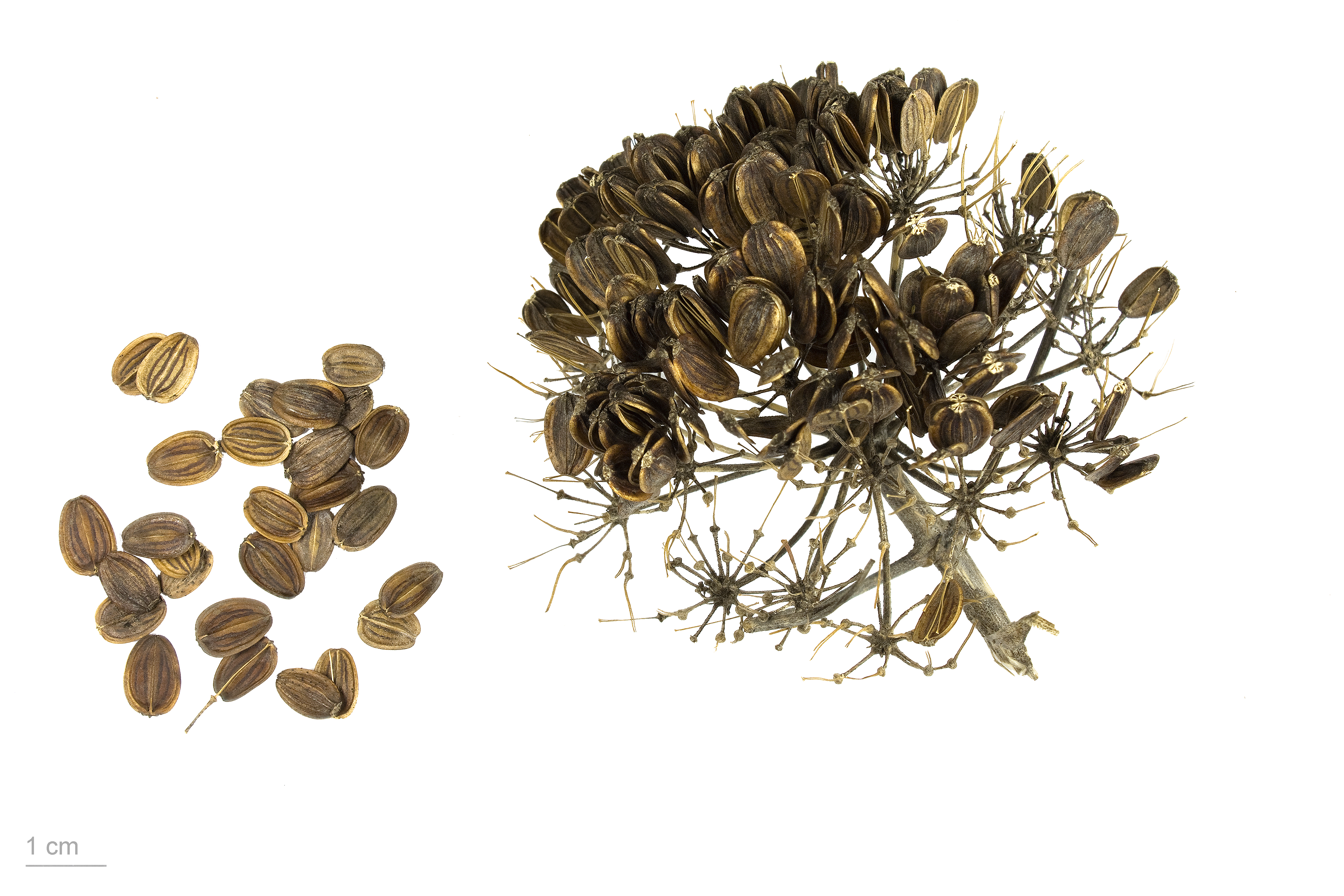
Ferula communis - MHNT

Ferula communis, the giant fennel, is a species of flowering plant in the carrot family Apiaceae. It is related to the common fennel (Foeniculum vulgare), which belongs to the same family.

Ferula communis is a tall herbaceous perennial plant. It is found in Mediterranean and East African woodlands and shrublands. It was known in antiquity as laser or narthex.

== Human use ==
Its young stems and inflorescences were eaten in ancient Rome, and are still eaten in Morocco today. However, culinary uses of this species are not always safe and poisoning may occur. In Sardinia two different chemotypes of Ferula communis have been identified: poisonous (especially to animals like sheep, goats, cattle, and horses) and non-poisonous. They differ in both secondary metabolites patterning and enzymatic composition.

The resin of the subspecies F. communis subsp. brevifolia is called gum ammoniac of Morocco.

The phenolic compound ferulic acid is named for the giant fennel, from which it can be isolated.

=== Resin extraction ===
Since antiquity, the resin of Ferula species has been used for medicinal purposes. The resin, in the form of a sticky latex, was usually extracted from the lower stalk or root, with the root resin being the finest-grade.

Where the resin of giant fennel (Ferula communis) was farmed, a small hole was pierced in its root with a sharp instrument, after clearing away all rocks and earth that cling to the exposed root. A small trench was dug beneath the root and overlaid with several smooth and flat stones at the bottom for collecting the exuded resin. The piercing was made deep enough into the root or lower stalk to ensure a steady flow of resin on its own pressure.

The resin was usually harvested in the dry and hot summer months, when dampness and moisture could not corrupt the resin. The resin hardens when exposed to the air, upon which it changes color to a brownish-red. The resin that exudes in coagulated, drop-like form is considered superior to that which runs down loosely.

=== As a tool for punishment ===
In the past, rods and whips for disciplinary purposes were made from stalks of Ferula. A Swedish disciplinary tool used in schools in the past, färla, derives its name from this.

=== In mythology ===
In Ancient Greek mythology, Prometheus gave mortals fire by hiding it in the plant's hollow stalk. Additionally, during the Classical period, a staff fashioned from Ferula communis called a Thyrsus (/ˈθɜːrsəs/) or thyrsos (/ˈθɜːrsɒs/; Ancient Greek: θύρσος) was carried by the devotees of Dionysus and used in Hellenic festivals and religious ceremonies.

== Subspecies ==
Ferula communis has five subspecies:

- Ferula communis subsp. brevifolia (Link ex Schult.) Elalaoui ex Dobignard – Canary Islands and northwestern Africa
- Ferula communis subsp. cardonae Sánchez-Cux. & M.Bernal – Balearic Islands and Sicily
- Ferula communis subsp. catalaunica (Pau) Sánchez-Cux. & M.Bernal – northeastern and eastern Spain
- Ferula communis subsp. communis – Mediterranean to Arabian Peninsula and Tanzania
- Ferula communis subsp. linkii (Webb) Reduron & Dobignard – Canary Islands
