= Reticulate evolution =

Merging of lineages

Phylogenetic network depicting reticulate evolution: Lineage B results from a horizontal transfer between its two ancestors A and C (blue, dotted lines).

Reticulate evolution, or network evolution is the origination of a lineage through the partial merging of two ancestor lineages, leading to relationships better described by a phylogenetic network than a bifurcating tree. Reticulate patterns can be found in the phylogenetic reconstructions of biodiversity lineages obtained by comparing the characteristics of organisms. Reticulation processes can potentially be convergent and divergent at the same time. Reticulate evolution indicates the lack of independence between two evolutionary lineages. Reticulation affects survival, fitness and speciation rates of species.

Reticulate evolution can happen between lineages separated only for a short time, for example through hybrid speciation in a species complex. Nevertheless, it also takes place over larger evolutionary distances, as exemplified by the presence of organelles of bacterial origin in eukaryotic cells.

Reticulation occurs at various levels: at a chromosomal level, meiotic recombination causes evolution to be reticulate; at a species level, reticulation arises through hybrid speciation and horizontal gene transfer; and at a population level, sexual recombination causes reticulation.

The adjective reticulate stems from the Latin words reticulatus, "having a net-like pattern" from reticulum, "little net."

== Underlying mechanisms and processes ==
Since the nineteenth century, scientists from different disciplines have studied how reticulate evolution occurs. Researchers have increasingly succeeded in identifying these mechanisms and processes. It has been found to be driven by symbiosis, symbiogenesis (endosymbiosis), lateral gene transfer, hybridization and infectious heredity.

=== Symbiosis ===
Symbiosis is a close and long-term biological interaction between two different biological organisms. Often, both of the organisms involved develop new features upon the interaction with the other organism. This may lead to the development of new, distinct organisms. The alterations in genetic material upon symbiosis can occur via germline transmission or lateral transmission. Therefore, the interaction between different organisms can drive evolution of one or both organisms.

=== Symbiogenesis ===
Symbiogenesis (endosymbiosis) is a special form of symbiosis whereby an organism lives inside another, different organism. Symbiogenesis is thought to be very important in the origin and evolution of eukaryotes. Eukaryotic organelles, such as mitochondria, have been theorized to have been originated from cell-invaded bacteria living inside another cell.

=== Lateral gene transfer ===
Lateral gene transfer, or horizontal gene transfer, is the movement of genetic material between unicellular and/or multicellular organisms without a parent-offspring relationship. The horizontal transfer of genes results in new genes, which could give new functions to the recipient and thus could drive evolution.

=== Hybridization ===
In the neo-Darwinian paradigm, one of the assumed definition of a species is that of Mayr's, which defines species based upon sexual compatibility. Mayr's definition therefore suggests that individuals that can produce fertile offspring must belong to the same species. However, in hybridization, two organisms produce offspring while being distinct species. During hybridization the characteristics of these two different species are combined yielding a new organism, called a hybrid, thus driving evolution.

=== Infectious heredity ===
Infectious agents, such as viruses, can infect the cells of host organisms. Viruses infect cells of other organisms in order to enable their own reproduction. Hereto, many viruses can insert copies of their genetic material into the host genome, potentially altering the phenotype of the host cell. When these viruses insert their genetic material in the genome of germ line cells, the modified host genome will be passed onto the offspring, yielding genetically differentiated organisms. Therefore, infectious heredity plays an important role in evolution, for example in the formation of the female placenta.

== Models ==
Reticulate evolution has played a key role in the evolution of some organisms such as bacteria and flowering plants. However, most methods for studying cladistics have been based on a model of strictly branching cladogeny, without assessing the importance of reticulate evolution. Reticulation at chromosomal, genomic and species levels fails to be modelled by a bifurcating tree.

According to Ford Doolittle, an evolutionary and molecular biologist: “Molecular phylogeneticists will have failed to find the “true tree,” not because their methods are inadequate or because they have chosen the wrong genes, but because the history of life cannot properly be represented as a tree”.

Reticulate evolution refers to evolutionary processes which cannot be successfully represented using a classical phylogenetic tree model, as it gives rise to rapid evolutionary change with horizontal crossings and mergings often preceding a pattern of vertical descent with modification. Reconstructing phylogenetic relationships under reticulate evolution requires adapted analytical methods. Reticulate evolution dynamics contradict the neo-Darwininan theory, compiled in the Modern Synthesis, by which the evolution of life occurs through natural selection and is displayed with a bifurcating or branching pattern. Frequent hybridisation between species in natural populations challenges the assumption that species have evolved from a common ancestor by simple branching, in which branches are genetically isolated. The study of reticulate evolution is said to have been largely excluded from the modern synthesis. The urgent need for new models which take reticulate evolution into account has been stressed by many evolutionary biologists, such as Nathalie Gontier who has stated "reticulate evolution today is a vernacular concept for evolutionary change induced by mechanisms and processes of symbiosis, symbiogenesis, lateral gene transfer, hybridization, or divergence with gene flow, and infectious heredity". She calls for an extended evolutionary synthesis that integrates these mechanisms and processes of evolution.

== Applications ==
Reticulate evolution has been extensively applied to plant hybridization in agriculture and gardening. The first commercial hybrids appeared in the early 1920s. Since then, many protoplast fusion experiments have been carried out, some of which were aimed at improvement of crop species. Wild types possessing desirable agronomic traits are selected and fused in order to yield novel, improved species. The newly generated plant will be improved for traits such as better yield, greater uniformity, improved color, and disease resistance.

== Examples ==
Reticulate evolution is regarded as a process that has shaped the histories of many organisms. There is evidence of reticulation events in flowering plants, as the variation patterns between angiosperm families strongly suggests there has been widespread hybridisation. Grant states that phylogenetic networks, instead of phylogenetic trees, arise in all major groups of higher plants. Stable speciation events due to hybridisation between angiosperm species supports the occurrence of reticulate evolution and highlights the key role of reticulation in the evolution of plants.

Genetic transfer can occur across wide taxonomic levels in microorganisms and become stably integrated into the new microbial populations, as has been observed through protein sequencing. Reticulation in bacteria usually only involves the transfer of only a few genes or parts of these. Reticulate evolution driven by lateral gene transfer has also been observed in marine life. Lateral genetic transfer of photo-response genes between planktonic bacteria and Archaea has been evidenced in some groups, showing an associated increase in environmental adaptability in organisms inhabiting photic zones.

Moreover, in the well-studied Darwin finches signs of reticulate evolution can be observed. Peter and Rosemary Grant, who carried out extensive research on the evolutionary processes of the Geospiza genus, found that hybridization occurs between some species of Darwin finches, yielding hybrid forms. This event could explain the origin of intermediate species. Jonathan Weiner commented on the observations of the Grants, suggesting the existence of reticulate evolution: "To the Grants, the whole tree of life now looks different from a year ago. The set of young twigs and shoots they study seems to be growing together in some seasons, apart in others. The same forces that created these lines are moving them toward fusion and then back toward fission."; and "The Grants are looking at a pattern that was once dismissed as insignificant in the tree of life. The pattern is known as reticulate evolution, from the Latin reticulum, diminutive for net. The finches' lines are not so much lines or branches at all. They are more like twiggy thickets, full of little networks and delicate webbings."
