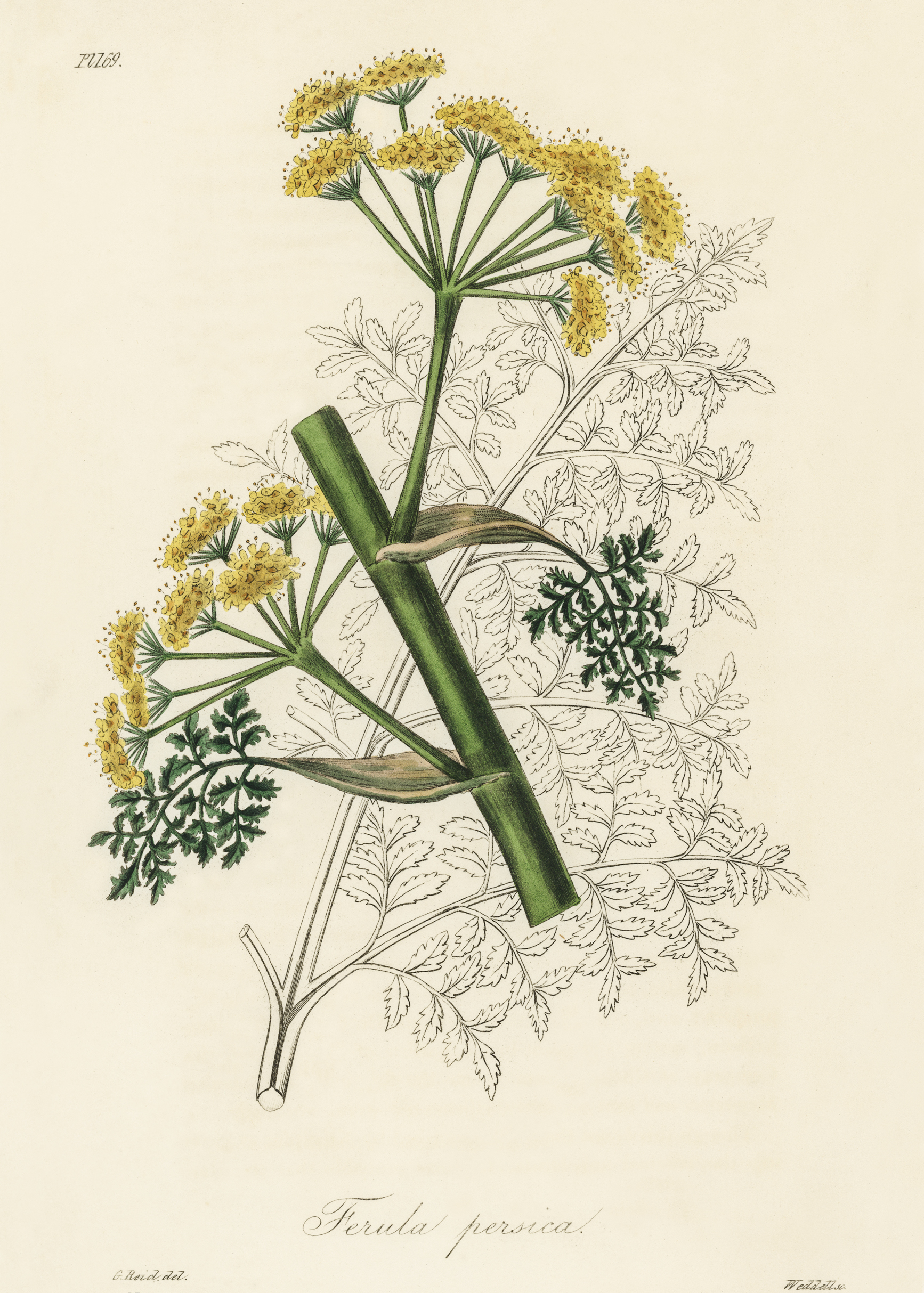
- Botanical illustration

Scientific classification
- Kingdom: Plantae
- Clade: Embryophytes
- Clade: Tracheophytes
- Clade: Spermatophytes
- Clade: Angiosperms
- Clade: Eudicots
- Clade: Asterids
- Order: Apiales
- Family: Apiaceae
- Genus: Ferula
- Species: F. persica

Binomial name
- Ferula persica Willd.

Synonyms
- Ferula puberula Boiss. & Buhse; Peucedanum persicum (Willd.) Baill.; Prangos euryangiodes Stapf & Wettst.

= Ferula persica =

Species of flowering plant

Ferula persica, the Persian asafoetida, is a species of flowering plant in the family Apiaceae, native to the Caucasus and Iran. It contains a number of matrix metalloproteinase inhibitors.
