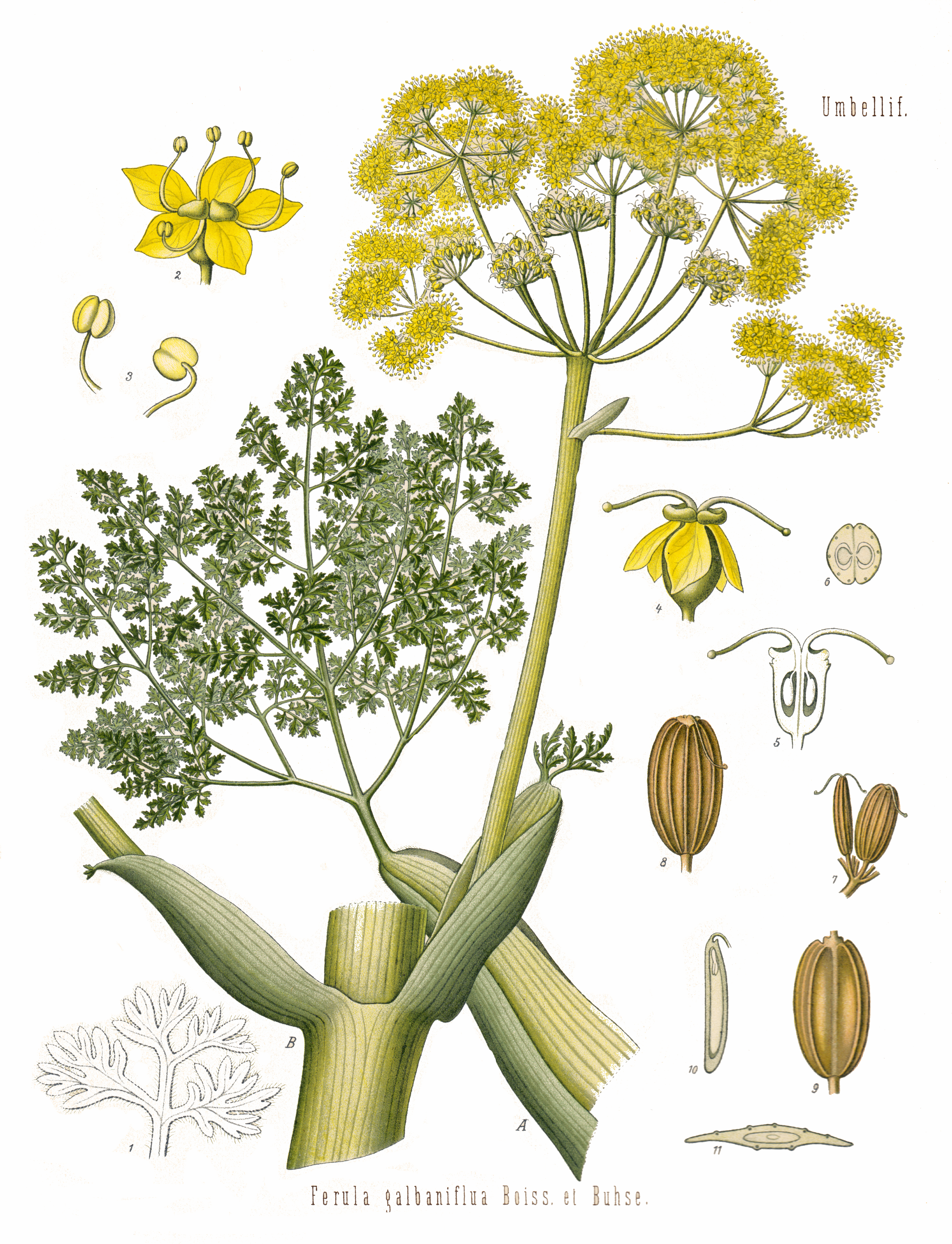

Scientific classification
- Kingdom: Plantae
- Clade: Tracheophytes
- Clade: Angiosperms
- Clade: Eudicots
- Clade: Asterids
- Order: Apiales
- Family: Apiaceae
- Genus: Ferula
- Species: F. gummosa

Binomial name
- Ferula gummosa Boiss.

Synonyms
- Ferula erubescens Boiss., ex parte – nomen confusum; Ferula galbaniflua Boiss. & Buhse; Peucedanum galbanifluum (Boiss. & Buhse) Baill.

= Ferula gummosa =

Species of perennial herb

Ferula gummosa is a perennial herb of Ferula in the family Apiaceae. It is native to Iran and Turkmenistan. Its gum resin is called galbanum.
