= GenSpera =

Inspyr Therapeutics, Inc.
- Type: Public
- Traded as: OTC:QB GNSZ
- Industry: Pharmaceutical
- Founded: 1903
- Founder: Craig Dionne, PhD; John Isaacs, PhD; Samuel Denmeade, MD
- Headquarters: San Antonio, Texas, USA
- Key people: Craig Dionne, PhD (President, Chairman, CEO, CFO); Russell Richerson, PhD (COO)
- Products: G-202
- Number of employees: 2
- Website: genspera.com

Inspyr Therapeutics, Inc. (OTC: NSPX) is a development-stage pharmaceutical company based in San Antonio, Texas. The company is focused on therapeutics that deliver a cancer-destroying drug directly to the tumor or its supporting environment, the tumor vasculature.

The company's prodrug technology renders the drug inactive until it encounters the programmed target, thereby delivering the cytotoxin directly to the cancer or the vessels that support it, while potentially avoiding the side effects associated with current chemotherapies. A prodrug is an inactive precursor of a drug that is converted into its active form at a targeted site.

GenSpera's lead drug candidate, G-202, is currently in a Phase II clinical trial for patients with hepatocellular carcinoma (HCC) whose disease has failed to improve on standard therapy for this indication. G-202 is also being evaluated in a Phase II clinical trial in glioblastoma patients with recurrent disease after surgery and/or radiation treatment of the primary tumor. G-202 targets the enzyme PSMA, found on the walls of blood vessels that feed most cancerous tumors, destroying the tumor blood supply. In contrast with anti-angiogenic agents, G-202 destroys existing as well as new cancer blood vessels. G-202 received Orphan Drug Designation from U.S. Food and Drug Administration for the treatment of HCC, the most common form of primary liver cancer.

The company also holds patents on prodrug candidates that target the prostate-specific enzymes Prostate Specific Antigen (PSA) and Human Glandular Kallikrein (hK2). These candidates are expected to be useful in the treatment of prostate cancer.

The active ingredient in G-202 is a chemotherapeutic agent derived from thapsigargin, a plant-based cytotoxin that kills by disrupting the calcium balance in cancer cells. GenSpera's prodrug delivery system keeps the thapsigargin inactive in the body until it finds cells that it has been programmed to seek. Once those cells in the body are found, the prodrug releases its active ingredient and destroys all of the targeted cells.

The National Cancer Institute had previously demonstrated that thaspigargin was ten-to-a-hundredfold more potent than traditional chemotherapeutic agents in killing all types of cells. Thapsigargin kills cells irrespective of the rate of cell division, which may provide an effective approach to kill both fast- and slow-growing cancers as well as cancer stem cells.

== History ==
In 1992, Professor John T. Isaacs of The Johns Hopkins School of Medicine in Baltimore, Maryland, was investigating ways to approach the treatment of slow-growing tumors and discovered they could be efficiently destroyed if intracellular calcium levels were raised significantly. He determined that the ideal agent for upsetting intracellular calcium levels was the novel chemical thapsigargin. He began collaborating with Dr. Soren Christensen, a natural products chemist, at the University of Copenhagen in Denmark, and the first scientist to isolate thapsigargin from the plant Thapsia garganica, a poisonous weed that grows wild in areas of the Mediterranean. The objective of the collaboration was to chemically alter thapsigargin to a derivative that could be linked to peptides, thus forming prodrugs to treat certain tumors.

Drs. Isaacs and Christensen were joined in their research by Dr. Hans Lilja, now at the Memorial Sloan-Kettering Cancer Center in New York, and Dr. Samuel Denmeade, of the Johns Hopkins School of Medicine. Together the four co-inventors developed a technology platform in which the therapeutic component of all the compounds would remain the same, but the targeting peptide would change. Peptides would be selected that could only be "cut off" or cleaved by enzymes specific for certain tumors.

In March 2016, CEO and CFO, Craig A. Dionne resigned and Peter E. Grebow was announced as interim CEO. On August 1, 2016 the company changed its name to Inspyr Therapeutics and began trading under NSPX.

== The company ==
GenSpera president and CEO Craig Dionne, PhD, co-founded GenSpera in 2003. He was previously vice president of biological research at Cephalon Inc., where he was responsible for neurobiology and oncology drug discovery. GenSpera was financed by a series of private placements beginning in 2007 and became publicly traded in late 2009.
