= Silphium =

Unidentified plant used as a seasoning and medicine

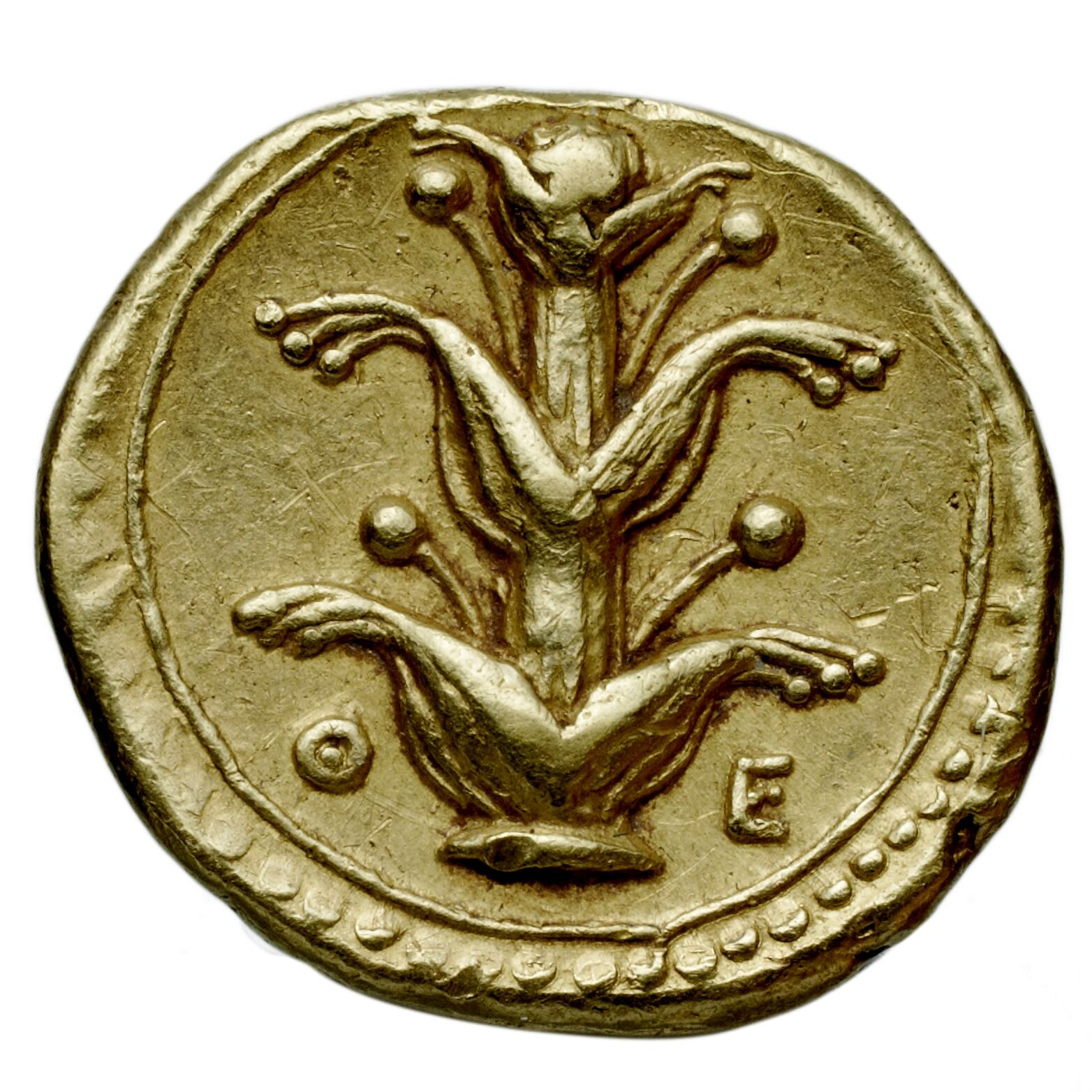
Four-branched silphium plant producing four bulbs and three leaflets on each branch, on a gold tenth-stater of Cyrenaica (331-322 BCE)

Silphium (also known as laserwort or laser; Ancient Greek: σίλφιον, sílphion) is an unidentified plant that was used in classical antiquity as a seasoning, perfume, aphrodisiac, and medicine.

It was an essential item of trade from the ancient North African city of Cyrene, and was so critical to the Cyrenian economy that most of their coins bore an image of the plant. The valuable product was the plant's resin, called in Latin laserpicium, lasarpicium, or laser (Laserpitium and Laser were used by botanists to name genera of aromatic plants, but the silphium plant is not believed to belong to these genera).

The exact identity of silphium is unclear. It was claimed to have become extinct in Roman times, but is commonly believed to have been a relative of giant fennel in the genus Ferula. The extant plant Thapsia gummifera has been suggested as another possibility. Another conjecture is that it was simply a high-quality variety of asafoetida, a common seasoning in the Roman Empire, for the two were considered the same by many Romans, including the geographer Strabo.

Silphium was considered highly valuable by all who held it. The plant was sung about by Roman poets and singers, who considered it equivalent to its weight in gold. Historically, Pliny the Elder blamed silphium's valuation on "tax-farmers", and Julius Caesar directly registered silphium as "1500 pounds of laser" in the Roman treasury.

== Identity and extinction ==
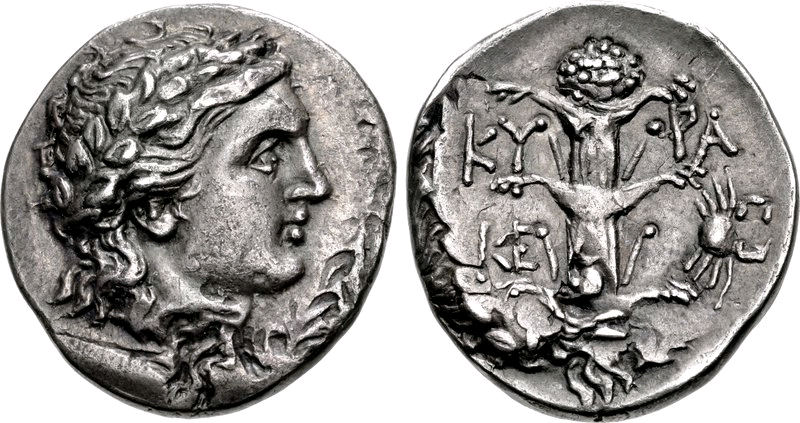
A coin of Magas of Cyrene c. 300–282/75 BC: the reverse has silphium and small crab symbols

The identity of silphium is highly debated. Without a surviving sample, no genetic analysis can be made. It is generally considered to belong to the genera Ferula or Thapsia as an extinct or living species. The extant plants Ferula tingitana, Ferula narthex, Ferula drudeana, Thapsia gummifera, and Thapsia garganica have been suggested as possible matches. Ferula drudeana, an endemic species found in Turkey, is considered a strong candidate for silphium based on several unusual shared features, such as the plant morphology, yellow foliage of mature plants, slow growth, resistance to cultivation from seed, and phytochemistry, including its production of an aromatic, spice-like gum resin with properties similar to those reported for silphium. However, F. drudeana belongs to a lineage from the southern Caspian Sea region with no known connection to eastern Libya. This species is also considered highly imperiled, with few surviving populations, and threats posed by overharvesting for use as an aphrodisiac.

Theophrastus mentioned silphium as having thick roots covered in black bark, about one cubit (48 cm) long, with a hollow stalk, similar to fennel, and golden leaves like those of celery.

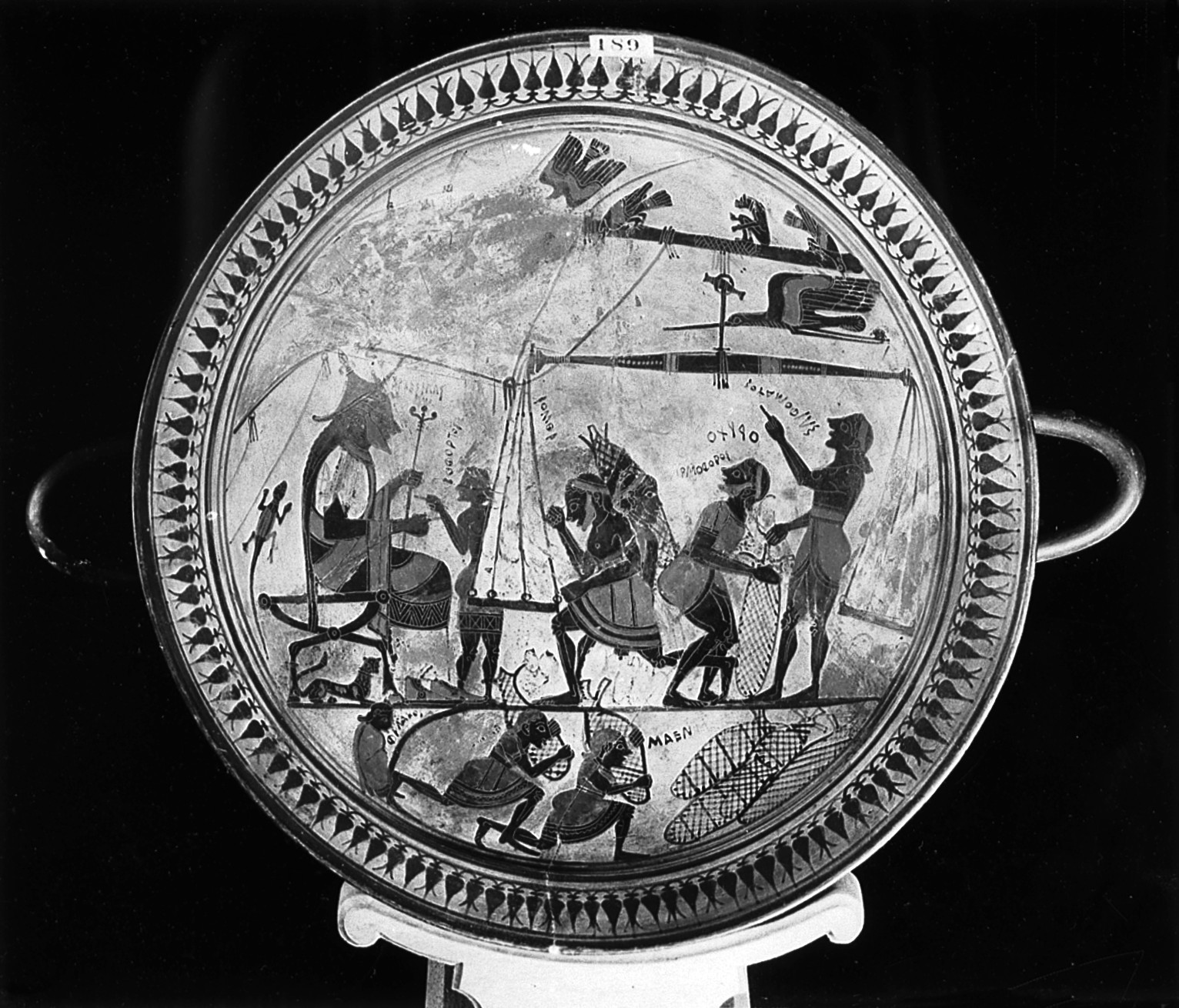
Weighing and loading of silphium at Cyrene

The disappearance of silphium has been suggested to be the first extinction of a plant or animal species in recorded history. The cause of silphium's supposed extinction is not entirely known, but numerous factors are suggested. Silphium had a remarkably narrow native range, about 125 by 35 miles (201 by 56 km), in the southern steppe of Cyrenaica (present-day eastern Libya). Overgrazing combined with overharvesting have long been cited as the primary factors that led to its extinction. Recent research has challenged this notion, though, arguing instead that desertification in ancient Cyrenaica was the primary driver of silphium's decline.

Another theory is that when Roman provincial governors took over from Greek colonists, they overfarmed silphium and rendered the soil unable to yield the type that was said to be of such medicinal value. Theophrastus wrote in Enquiry into Plants that the type of Ferula specifically referred to as "silphium" was odd in that it could not be cultivated. He reports inconsistencies in the information he received about this, however. This could suggest the plant is similarly sensitive to soil chemistry as huckleberries, which when grown from seed, are devoid of fruit.

Similar to the soil theory, another theory holds that the plant was a hybrid, which often results in very desired traits in the first generation, but hybrids are often sterile, so it is possible that silphium could not be propagated from seeds at all (which would indeed make cultivation considerably more difficult), but instead only asexually through their roots.

Pliny reported that the last known stalk of silphium found in Cyrenaica was given to Emperor Nero "as a curiosity".

== Ancient medicine ==
Many medical uses were ascribed to the plant. It was said that it could be used to treat cough, sore throat, fever, indigestion, aches and pains, warts, and all kinds of maladies. Hippocrates wrote:

When the gut protrudes and will not remain in its place, scrape the finest and most compact silphium into small pieces and apply as a cataplasm.

The plant may also have functioned as a contraceptive, aphrodisiac and abortifacient.

== Culinary uses ==
Silphium was used in Graeco-Roman cooking, notably in recipes presented in Apicius. Some historians have suggested that its use, particularly in the North African region of its origin, was extensive:

Not quite as ubiquitous as liquamen, but just as necessary in the Roman kitchen, was the herb silphium...Life in Cyrenaica revolved around [silphium] to such an extent that the dramatist Antiphanes, in the fourth century BC, made one of his characters groan: "I will not sail back to the place from which we were all carried away, for I want to say goodbye to all—horses, silphium, chariots, silphium stalks, steeple-chasers, silphium leaves, and silphium juice!"

Long after its claimed extinction, silphium continued to be mentioned in lists of aromatics copied one from another, until it makes perhaps its last appearance in the list of spices that the Carolingian cook should have at hand—Brevis pimentorum que in domo esse debeant ("A short list of condiments that should be in the home")—by a certain "Vinidarius", whose excerpts of Apicius (Note: A generic term for a cookery book, as "Webster" is of American dictionaries.) survive in one eighth-century uncial manuscript. Vinidarius's dates may not be much earlier.

== Hieroglyphs and symbols for silphium ==
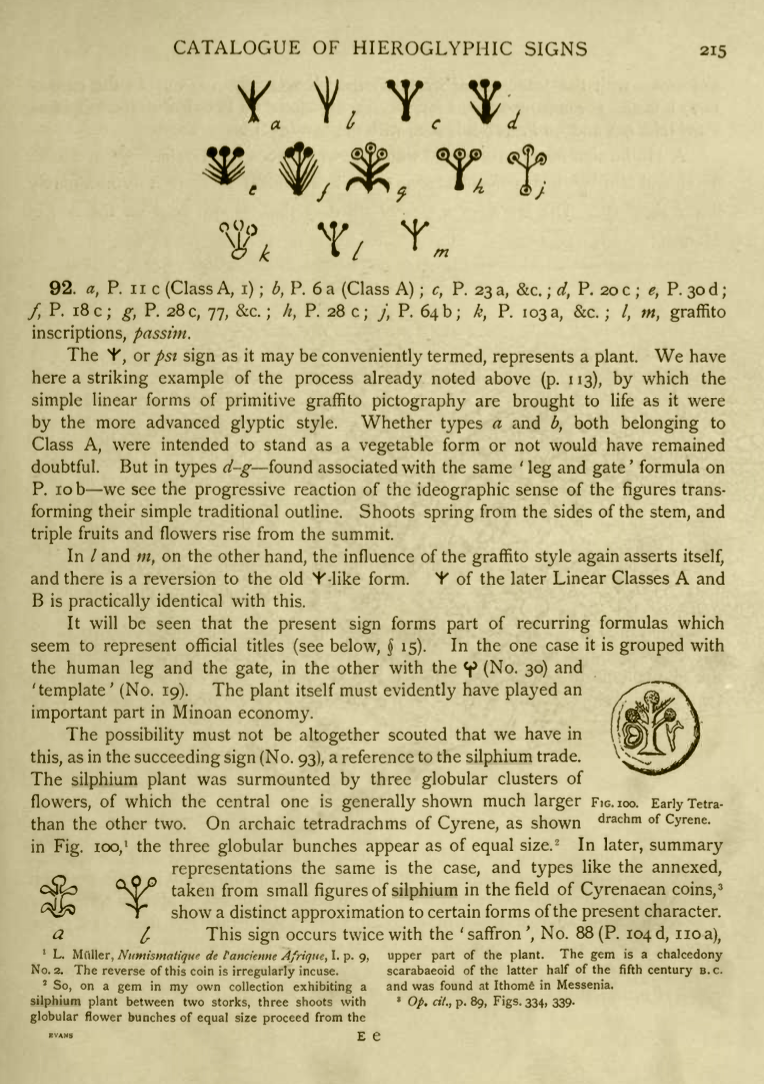
Evans's 1921 description of silphium hieroglphys at Knossos

The Minoans probably used silphium as the visual reference for the hieroglyph psi, meaning "plant". It resembles a central shoot flanked by two stalks. Minoan fetishes with this geometry are known as psi and phi type figurines, and are also designed for their letter-like shape. This glyph developed into the modern Greek psi (Ψ).

Egyptian hieroglyphs for Libyan silphium have also been documented in archaeological publications as a balm ingredient that must be dehulled and which produces a sap or resin. In one record, it appears similar to the hieroglyph for branch (𓆱), written to be read from left to right.

Ancient Cyrenean silver coin depicting a silphium seed or fruit

Some speculation exists about the connection between silphium and the traditional heart shape (♥). Silver coins from Cyrene of the 6th to 5th centuries BCE bear a similar design, sometimes accompanied by a silphium plant, and is understood to represent its seed or fruit. Some plants in the family Apiaceae, such as Heracleum sphondylium, have heart-shaped indehiscent mericarps (a type of fruit).

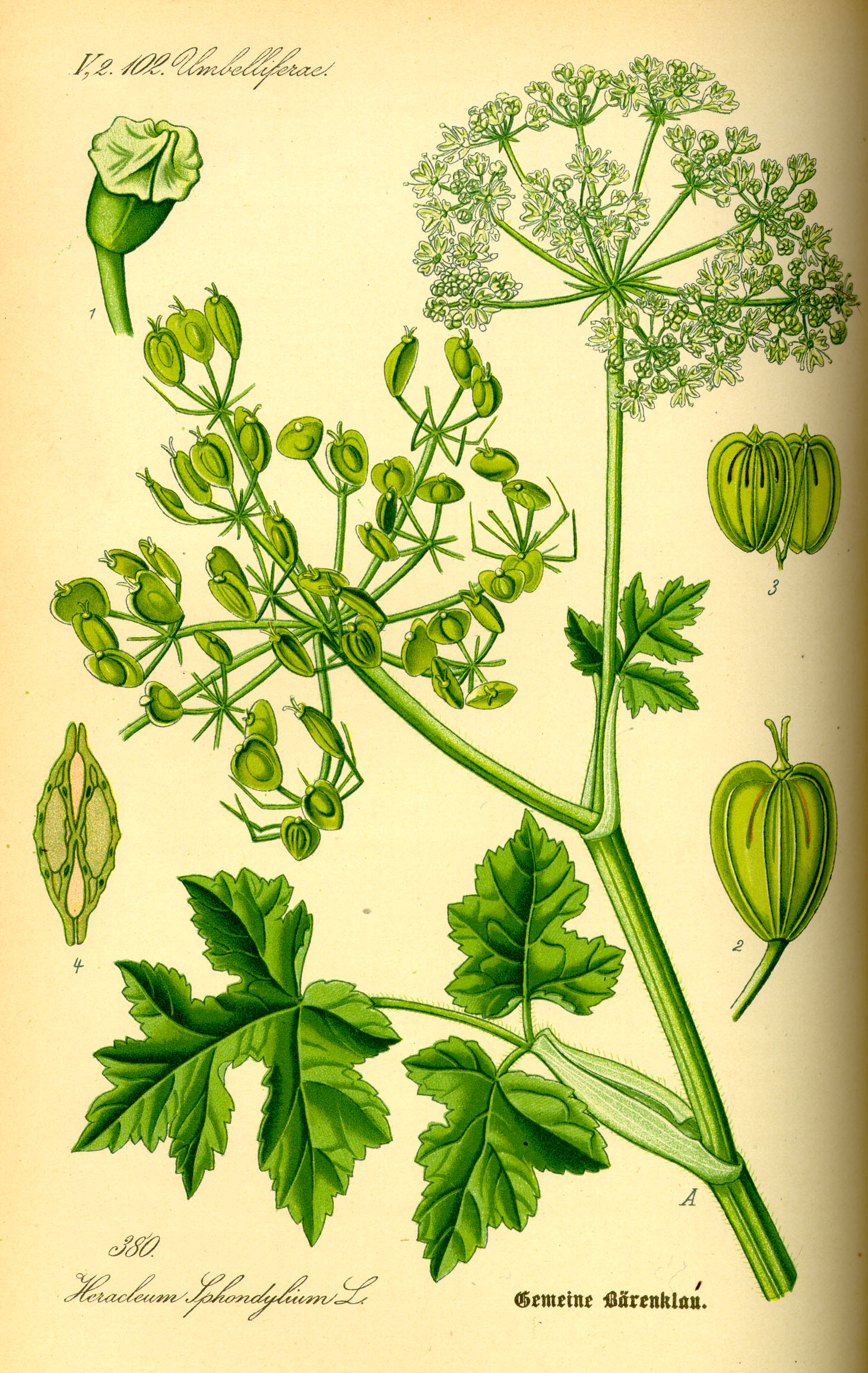
Drawing of Heracleum sphondylium, showing its heart-shaped mericarp

Contemporary writings help tie silphium to sexuality and love. Silphium appears in Pausanias' Description of Greece in a story of the Dioscuri staying at a house belonging to Phormion, a Spartan:

For it so happened that his maiden daughter was living in it. By the next day, this maiden and all her girlish apparel had disappeared, and in the room were found images of the Dioscuri, a table, and silphium upon it.

Silphium as laserpicium makes an appearance in a poem (Catullus 7) of Catullus to his lover Lesbia (though others have suggested that the reference here is, instead, to silphium's use as a treatment for mental illness, tying it to the "madness of love").

== Heraldry ==
In the Italian military heraldry, il silfio d'oro reciso di Cirenaica ("Silphium of Cyrenaica, smoothly cut and printed in gold; in blazon: silphium couped or of Cyrenaica") is the symbol granted to units that distinguished themselves in the Western Desert Campaign in North Africa during World War II.

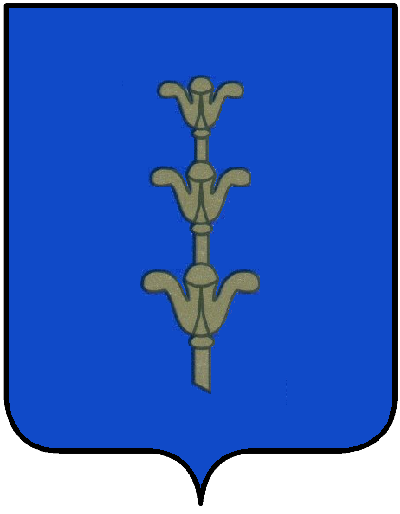
Italian coat of arms Il silfio d'oro reciso di Cirenaica

Silphium depicted on the arms of Italian Libya

== In popular culture ==
Characters in Lindsey Davis's 1998 historical crime novel Two for the Lions travel from Rome to North Africa in search of silphium.

Silphium is the subject and title of a song on the album Henki, a 2021 collaboration between English singer-songwriter Richard Dawson and the Finnish experimental rock group Circle.

== See also ==
- Necropolis of Cyrene
