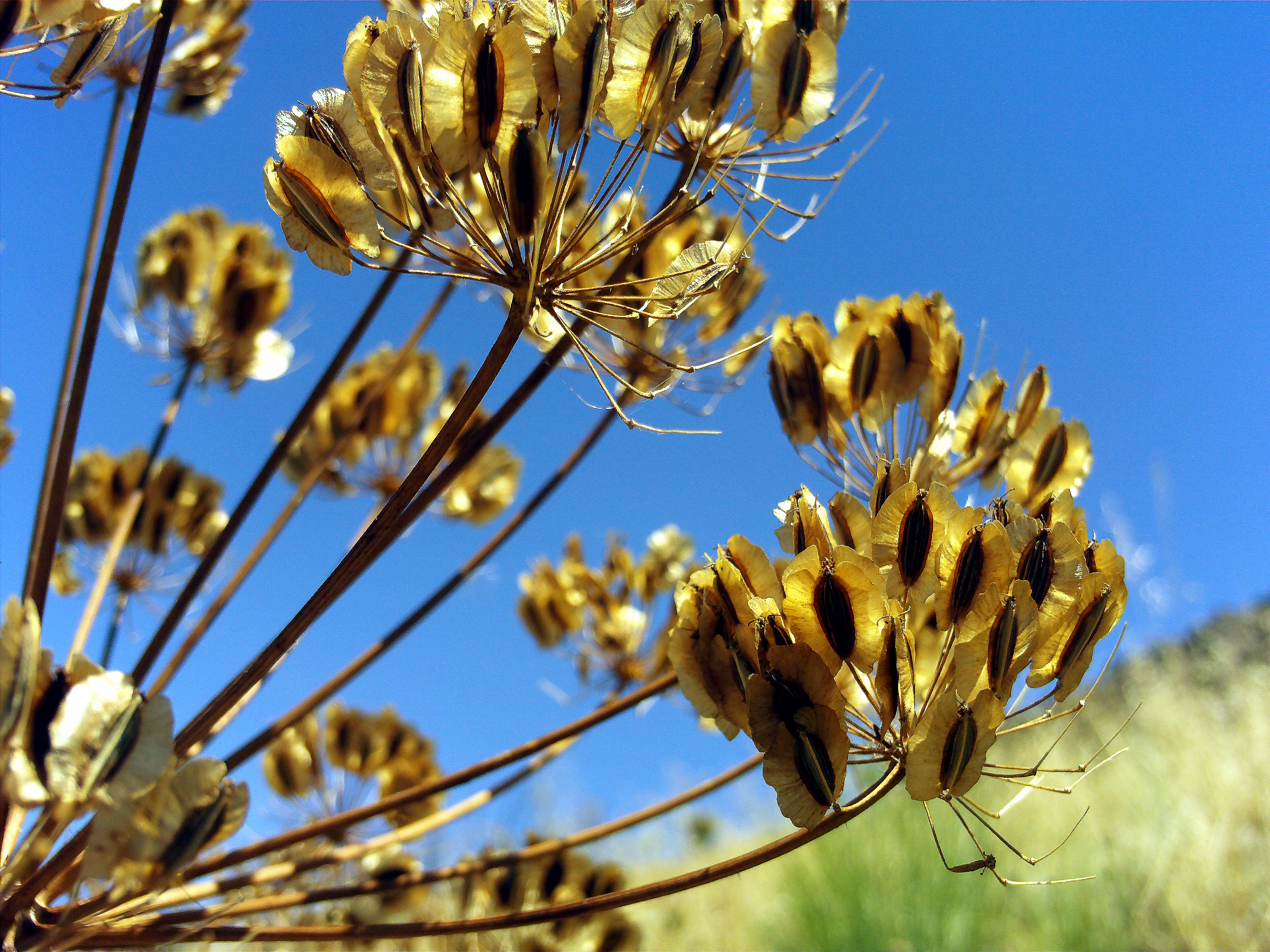
- Mature fruits of Thapsia villosa showing the characteristic four wings

Scientific classification
- Kingdom: Plantae
- Clade: Tracheophytes
- Clade: Angiosperms
- Clade: Eudicots
- Clade: Asterids
- Order: Apiales
- Family: Apiaceae
- Genus: Thapsia
- Species: T. villosa

Binomial name
- Thapsia villosa L.

Varieties
- Thapsia villosa var. villosa L.; Thapsia villosa var. dissecta Boiss.

Synonyms
- Thapsia dissecta (Boiss.) Arán & Mateo; Thapsia maxima Mill.; Thapsia laciniata Rouy

= Thapsia villosa =

Species of flowering plant

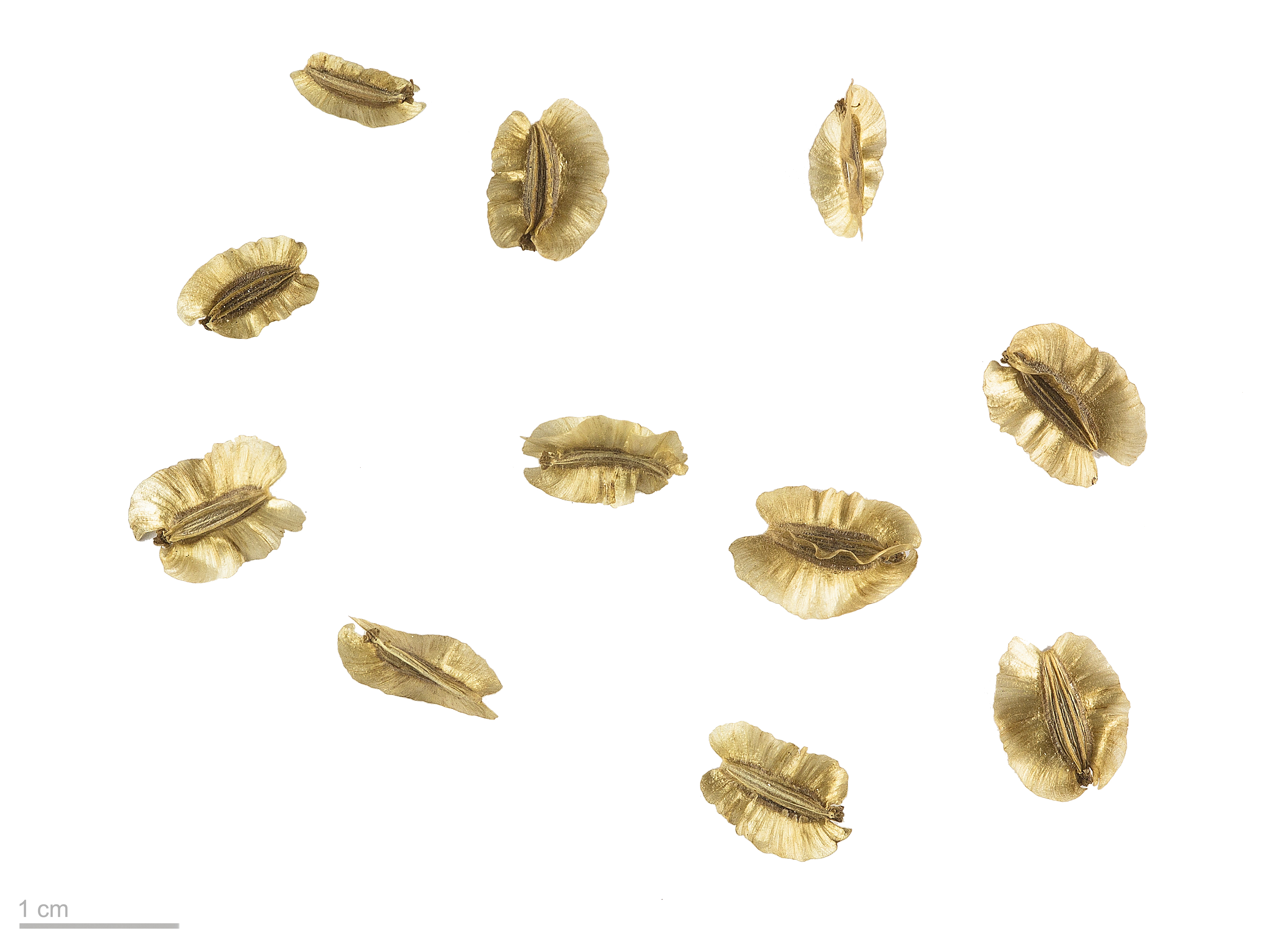
Thapsia villosa - MHNT

Thapsia villosa, commonly known as the villous deadly carrot, is a species of poisonous herbaceous plants in the genus Thapsia. It grows to about 70 to 190 cm (28 to 75 in) in height. It has pinnate hairy leaves with sheath-like petioles. The flowers are yellow in color and borne on compound umbels. They develop into fruits with four wings characteristic of the genus. It is native to southwestern Europe and northwestern Africa surrounding the Mediterranean Sea. The plant was used extensively for traditional medicine since around the 3rd century BC.

== Taxonomy ==
Thapsia villosa was first described by Carl Linnaeus in Species Plantarum (1753). It is classified under the genus Thapsia, subfamily Apioideae, of the carrot and parsley family Apiaceae. Two varieties are recognized: T. villosa var. villosa and T. villosa var. dissecta.

The generic name Thapsia is derived from the Ancient Greek name θαψία (thapsía) for the members of the genus. The Greeks believe it to have originated from ancient Thapsos in Sicily. The specific epithet is from Latin villōsus ("hairy" or "shaggy").

It is commonly known in English as the 'villous deadly carrot' or simply 'deadly carrot'. It is known under a large number of common names in other languages, including bu-nefar in Arabic; zumillo and cañaheja in Spanish; baladra in Catalan; croca in Majorcan; turbit-da-terra in Portuguese; bermidor in Basque; turbith bâtard in French; and turbito falso in Italian.

== Description ==
Thapsia villosa is a perennial herb growing to a height of 70 to 190 cm (28 to 75 in). It has a robust and smooth tapering stem about 5 to 25 mm (0.20 to 0.98 in) in diameter, arising from a thick root resembling a white carrot or turnip.

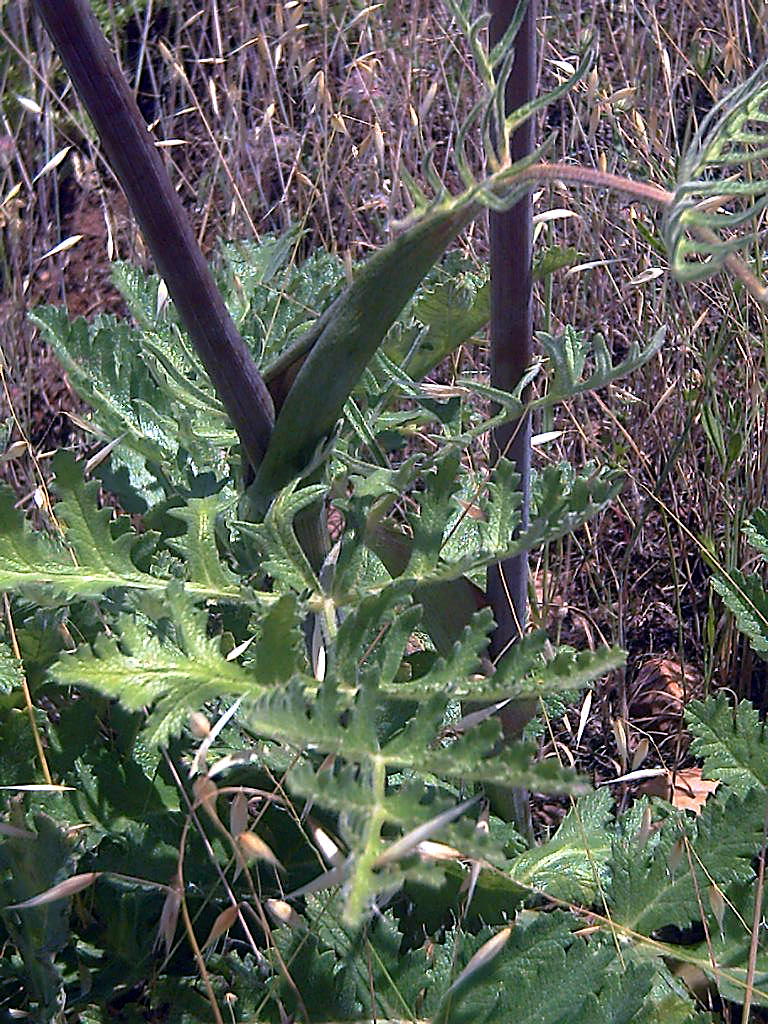
Pinnate leaves and sheath-like petioles of T. villosa

The leaves, like the name of the species suggests, are hairy. The leaves around the base of the stem have well-developed sheath-like petioles about 20 to 80 mm (0.79 to 3.15 in) wide. Like the leaves, they are also hairy. They are whitish, yellowish, green, or (rarely) purple in color. The leaf blades are triangular to deltoid in shape and are pinnate, subdivided once to thrice. The last leaflet subdivision is usually about 8 to 32 mm (0.31 to 1.26 in) wide in T. villosa var. villosa; while they are only about 1.5 to 3 mm (0.059 to 0.118 in) wide in T. villosa var. dissecta. The margins of the leaves are curled (revolute) with small teeth-like and triangular serrated edges, each tipped with small spike. The main leaf midrib (rachis) is densely covered in hair and light to dark green on the upper side, while it is smooth and grayish to greenish on the underside. The leaves are largest at the bottom and progressively become smaller the higher they are on the stem. In the upper parts of the stem, the leaves are often reduced to nothing more than petioles which form sheaths around the stem.

Like other members of the genus, the inflorescence of Thapsia villosa is a compound subhemispherical to globose umbel. It has 9 to 29 spokes and is about 6 to 12 cm (2.4 to 4.7 in) in diameter. Bracts are usually absent, though in rare cases, one to three may be present, each around 6 to 40 mm (0.24 to 1.57 in) in length and lanceolate in shape. The umbellules are hemispherical to globose. Bracteoles are also usually absent, though rarely 1 or 2 may be present. Each umbellule has about 18 to 43 flowers, each with five bright yellow elliptical petals. The fruits are oblong and around 9 to 15 mm (0.35 to 0.59 in) long and 6 to 11 mm (0.24 to 0.43 in) wide. When mature, they are light to dark brown in color with four yellowish to brownish wings characteristic of the genus. The main umbel has hermaphroditic flowers, containing both stamen and pistil. Smaller umbels may develop from the sides of the stem which usually contains only stamens. These umbels wither away quickly.

Thapsia villosa is highly variable in morphology. The two varieties, T. villosa var. dissecta and T. villosa var. villosa are usually distinguished by how many times the leaf subdivides into leaflets. T. villosa var. dissecta has leaves that are deeply subdivided two or three times into narrow and small leaflets. T. villosa var. villosa, in contrast are usually subdivided only once or twice. However, there are numerous intermediate forms between the two varieties and distinguishing between them can be very difficult. The diploid chromosome number (2n) of Thapsia villosa is 22, 33, 44, or 66.

== Ecology ==
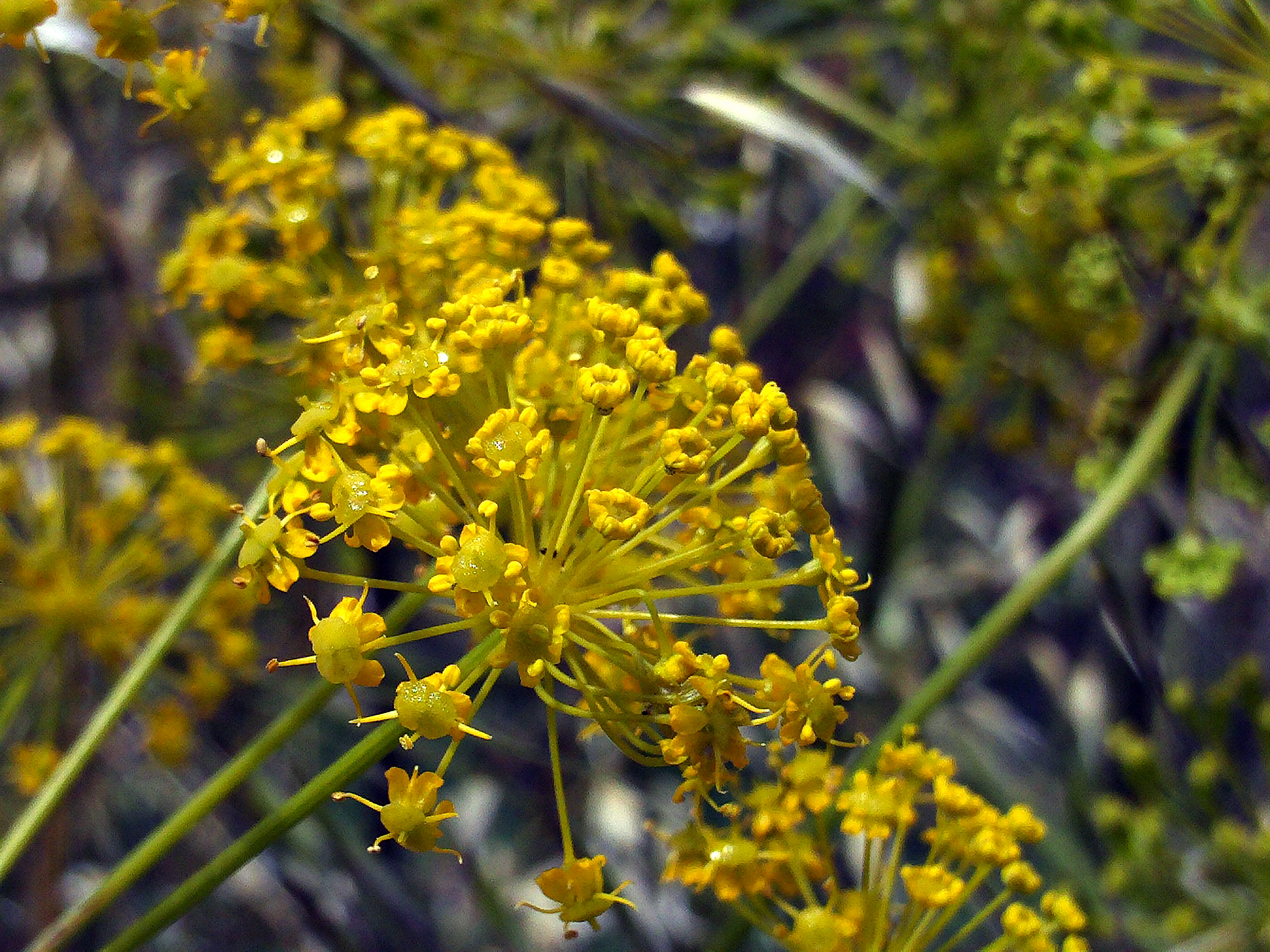
Flowers of an umbellule of Thapsia villosa

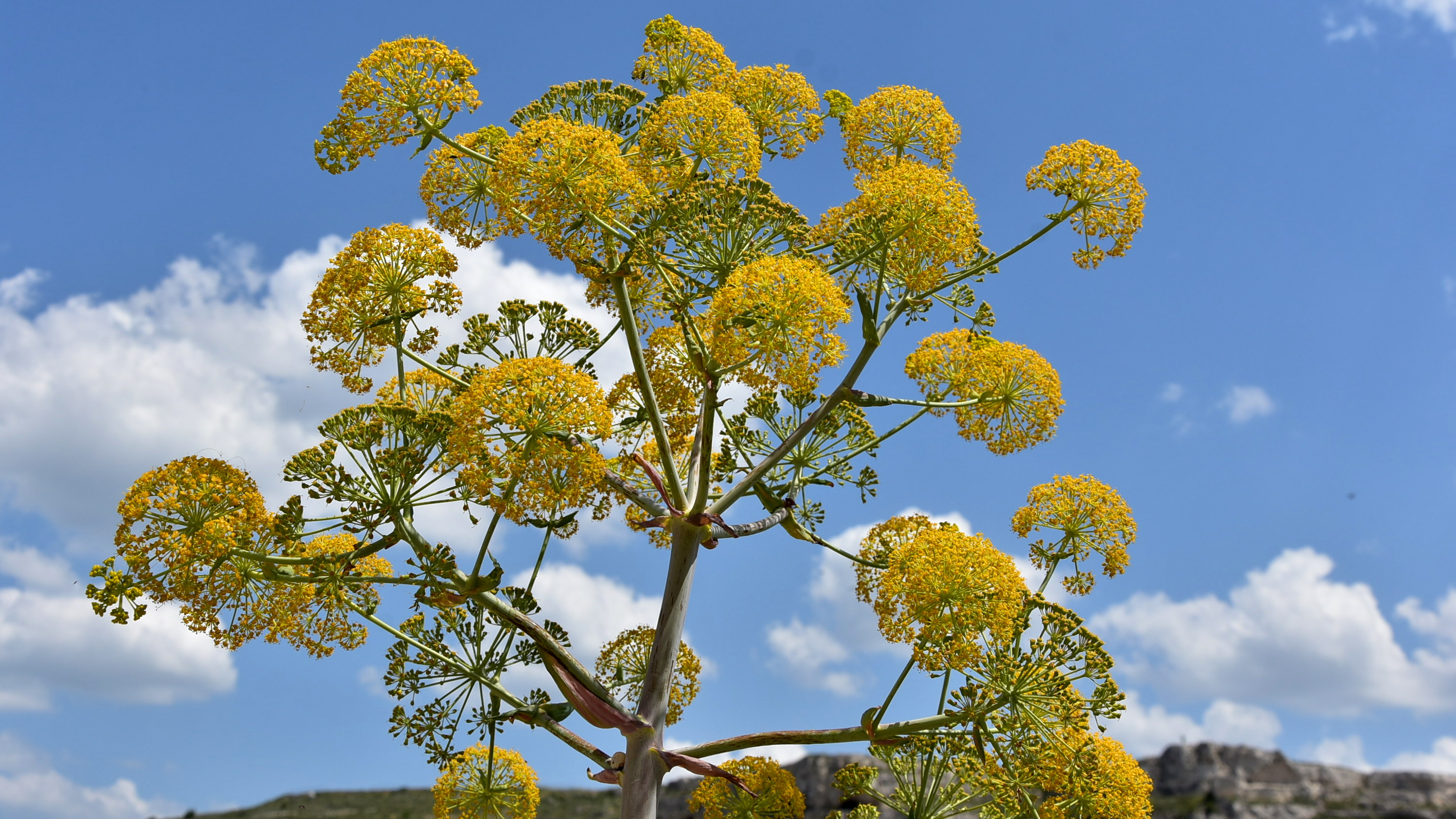
Thapsia villosa in Matera, Italy

Unlike most members of the family Apiaceae, Thapsia villosa flowers early, during the months of May, June, and July. The flowers are pollinated by a variety of insects. The flowers develop into winged fruits that dry out around August, while other members of the family are usually still in bloom.

== Distribution and habitat ==
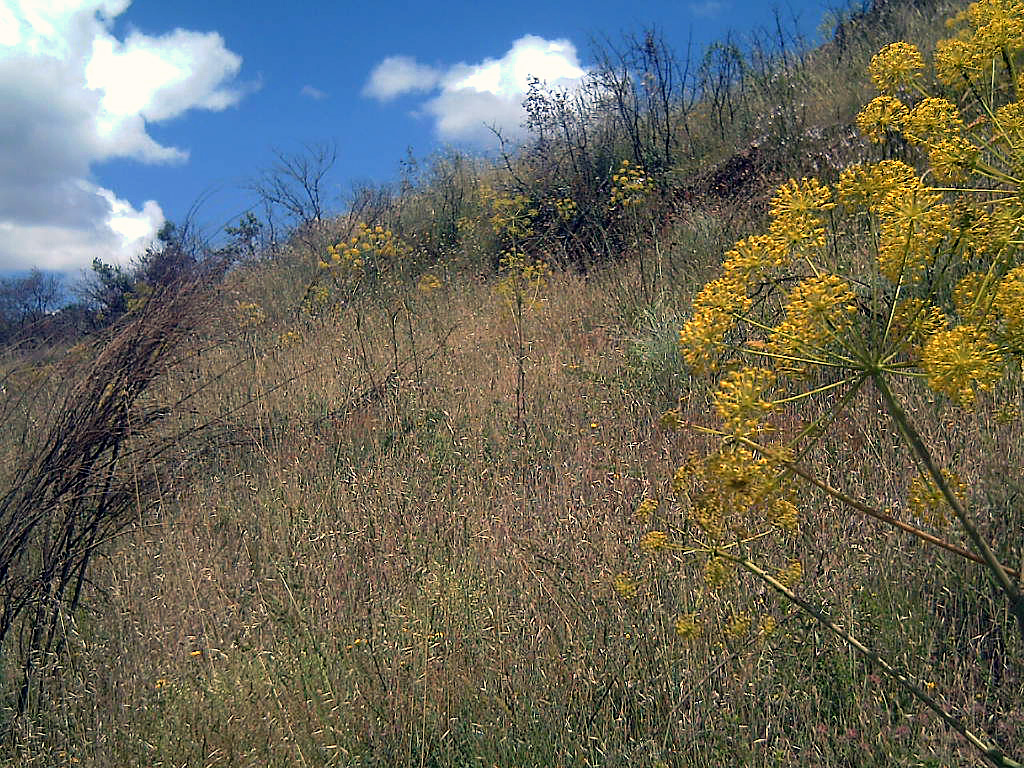
Thapsia villosa in bloom in Puertollano, Spain

The native range of Thapsia villosa extends from southern France and the Iberian Peninsula (Spain, Portugal, and Gibraltar) to northwestern Africa (Morocco, Algeria, and Tunisia). It has also been introduced into Corsica. They can be found growing at altitudes of 0 to 1,800 m (0 to 5,906 ft) above sea level in scrublands, clearings, and near recently disturbed land like roads or cultivated fields.

In its native range, it is frequently confused with the similar-looking Ferula communis, the giant fennel. Thapsia villosa and Ferula communis share some common names in Spanish like cañaheja. Reports of Thapsia villosa in the Balearic Isles is likely the result of confusion with Thapsia gymnesica.

== Toxicity ==
Thapsia villosa is highly poisonous. Skin contact with the roots can cause severe itching and swelling.

== Uses ==
=== Traditional medicine ===
The medicinal properties of the members of the genus Thapsia were recognized as early 300 BC. In traditional medicine, the roots of Thapsia villosa were used as a purgative and emetic. Resin from the Thapsia villosa was used as a blister-producing agent (vesicant) or a counterirritant, similar to resin derived from Thapsia garganica. In Spain, the resin is also traditionally used in Segarra as treatment for scabies. Poultices made from root bark infused with oil was used as a pain-reliever and for treating rheumatism. These were also used in Salamanca for treating cracks in horse hooves.

Traditional medicinal uses of the plant, however, are now considered largely ineffective and highly inadvisable due to the danger posed by the poisons of Thapsia villosa.

=== Medical research ===
Along with Thapsia garganica and Thapsia transtagana, Thapsia villosa var. villosa contains C-19 terpenolides with strong SERCA-inhibiting properties in vitro. They are of interest to medical researchers for their potential in treating neurodegenerative disorders like Alzheimer's or Parkinson's disease.

=== Other uses ===
Poison from the roots of Thapsia villosa is traditionally used by fishermen in Catalonia as an ichthyotoxin for stunning fish, making them easier to catch. Extracts from the root bark of Thapsia villosa have been used since ancient times as a yellow dye. In the 18th century, yellow dye from the flowers were used to color wool. Thapsia villosa are also grown as ornamentals for their bright yellow flowers.
