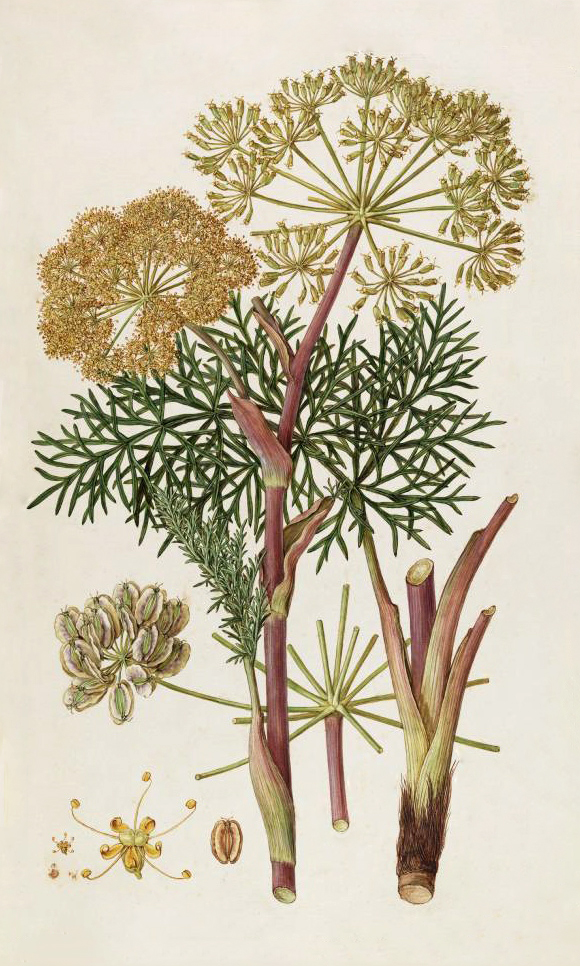
- Thapsia garganica

Scientific classification
- Kingdom: Plantae
- Clade: Tracheophytes
- Clade: Angiosperms
- Clade: Eudicots
- Clade: Asterids
- Order: Apiales
- Family: Apiaceae
- Subfamily: Apioideae
- Tribe: Scandiceae
- Subtribe: Daucinae
- Genus: Thapsia; L.

Synonyms
- Distichoselinum F.García Mart. & Silvestre; Elaeoselinum W.D.J.Koch ex DC.; Guillonea Coss.; Margotia Boiss.

= Thapsia (plant) =

Genus of plants

Thapsia, commonly known as the deadly carrots, is a small genus of poisonous plants in the family Apiaceae. Their center of diversity is around the western Mediterranean, extending into the Atlantic coasts of Portugal and Morocco. Some species are used in traditional medicine.

== Description ==
Species of Thapsia are herbaceous perennials, growing 50 to 200 cm high. The inflorescences are large, regularly distributed umbels. The seeds have four wings, and are the main characteristic of the genus, which is distributed in the Mediterranean, on the Iberian Peninsula, and North Africa.

The generic name Thapsia is derived from the Ancient Greek name θαψία (thapsía) for the members of the genus. The Greeks believe it to have originated from ancient Thapsos in Sicily. It has a long history of being used in ancient traditional medicine. Algerians used it as a pain-reliever though they recognized that the plant was deadly to camels. The Greek colony of Cyrene exported a medicinal plant known as silphion, used as a purgative and emetic. Although its exact identity remains contentious today, some historians believe that the plant may have been Thapsia garganica.

== Cancer research ==
The chemical compound thapsigargin has been isolated from Thapsia garganica. A synthetic prodrug of thapsigargin called "G-202" is in preliminary clinical trials for cancer treatment. The active constituent kills tumor cells by destroying their calcium balance. A biotech company called GenSpera, Inc. in San Antonio, TX is studying methods of delivering thapsigargin directly to cancer cells, avoiding damage to other cells in the body of the patient.

== Antiviral research ==
This same chemical compound thapsigargin is now being looked at as an antiviral to use against SARS-coV-2, the coronavirus virus that causes COVID-19. It has not yet reached the clinical trial stage.

== Species ==
20 species of Thapsia are currently accepted. It is, however, a complex genus, and some authors may recognize different numbers of species.

- Thapsia asclepium L.
- Thapsia cinerea A.Pujadas
- Thapsia eliasii (Sennen & Pau) Wojew., Banasiak, Reduron & Spalik
- Thapsia foetida L.
- Thapsia garganica L.
- Thapsia gummifera (Desf.) Spreng.
- Thapsia gymnesica Rosselló & A.Pujadas
- Thapsia maxima Mill.
- Thapsia meoides (Desf.) Guss.
- Thapsia minor Hoffmans & Link
- Thapsia nestleri (Soy.-Will.) Wojew., Banasiak, Reduron & Spalik
- Thapsia nitida Lacaita
- Thapsia pelagica Brullo, Guglielmo, Pasta, Pavone & Salmeri
- Thapsia platycarpa Pomel
- Thapsia scabra (Cav.) Simonsen, Rønsted, Weitzel & Spalik
- Thapsia smittii Simonsen, Rønsted, Weitzel & Spalik
- Thapsia tenuifolia Lag.
- Thapsia thapsioides (Desf.) Simonsen, Rønsted, Weitzel & Spalik
- Thapsia transtagana Brot.
- Thapsia villosa L.

== Gallery ==
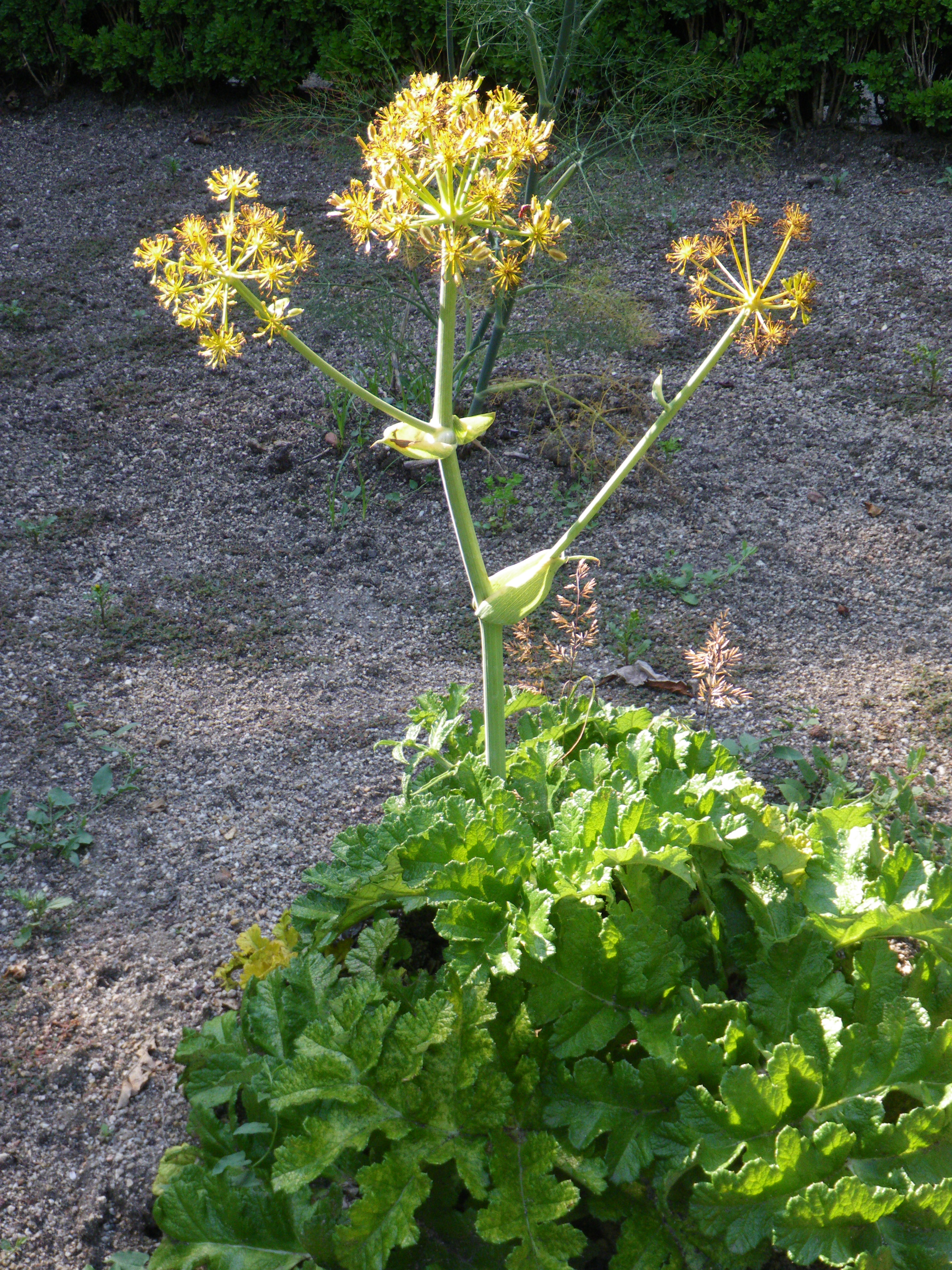
Thapsia nitida

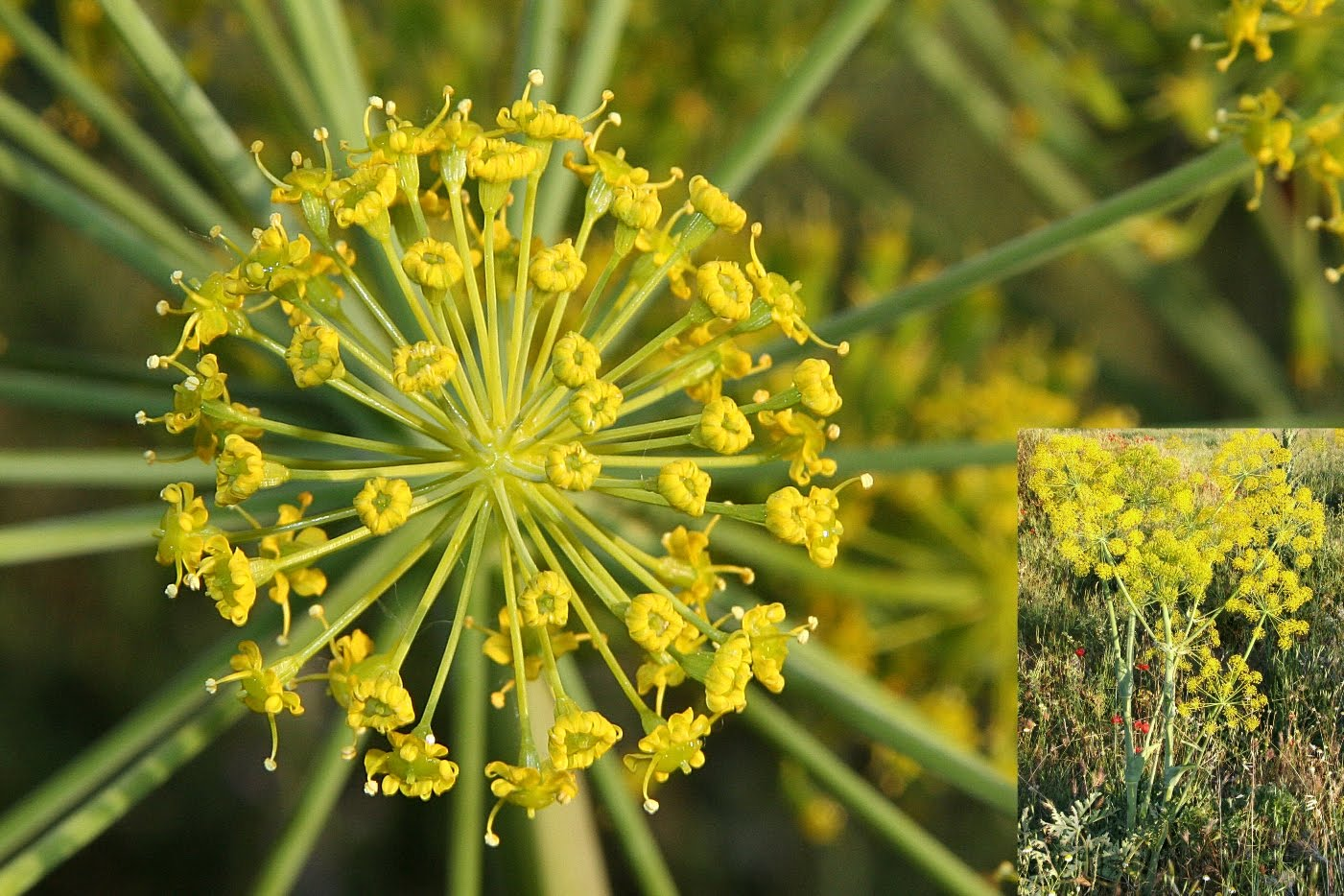
Thapsia villosa
