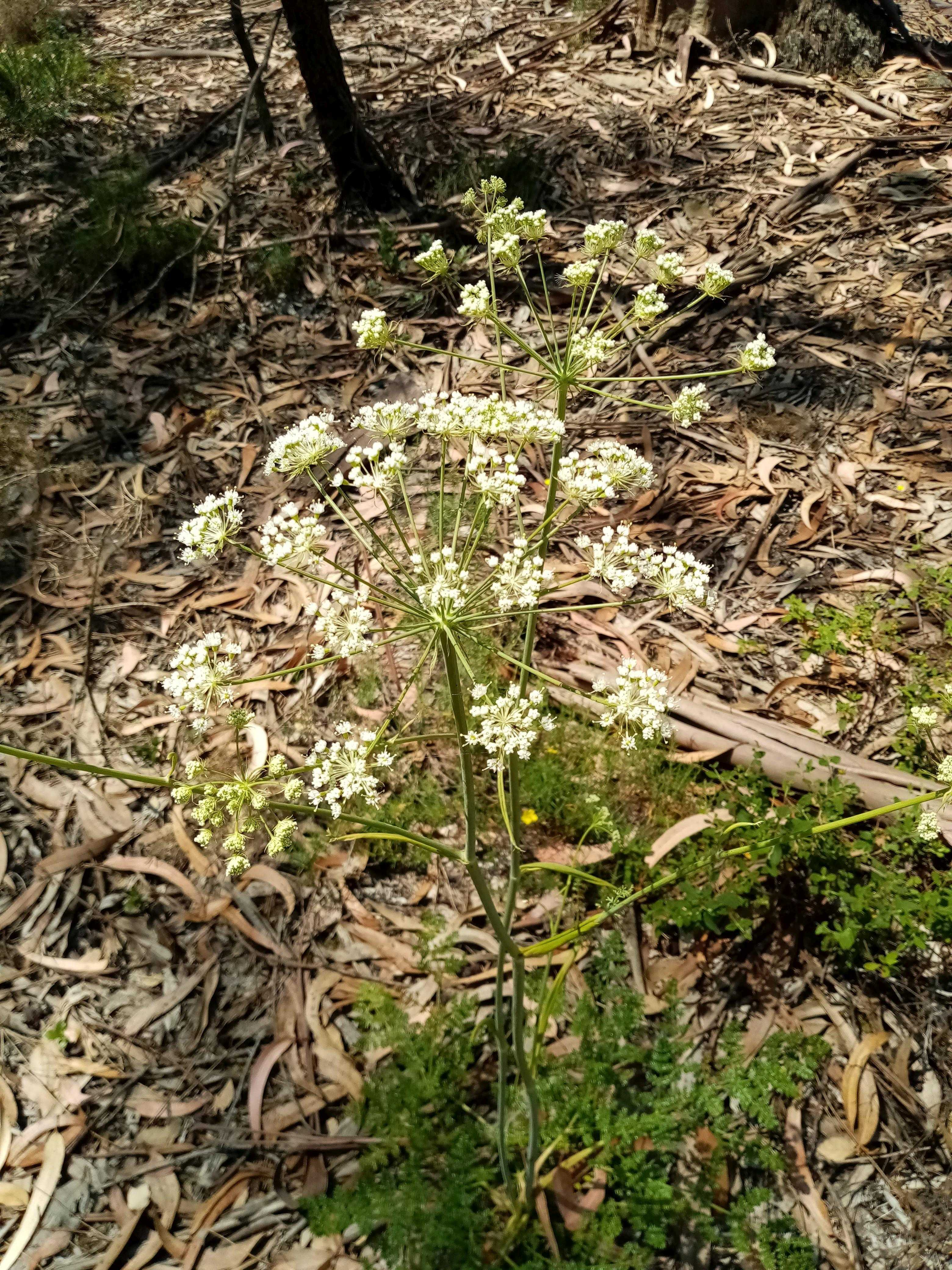
- In bloom in Portugal
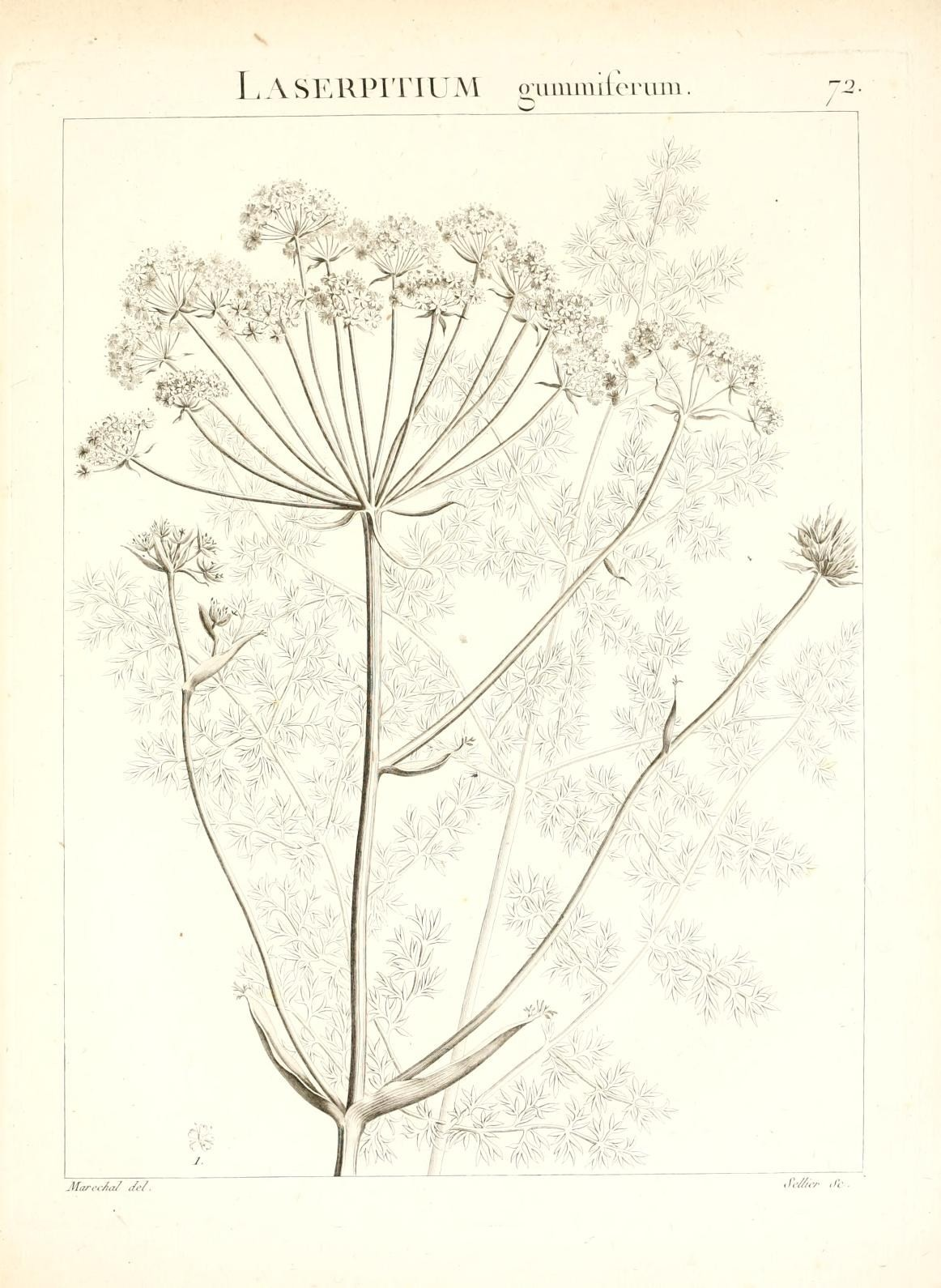
- Botanical illustration

Scientific classification
- Kingdom: Plantae
- Clade: Embryophytes
- Clade: Tracheophytes
- Clade: Spermatophytes
- Clade: Angiosperms
- Clade: Eudicots
- Clade: Asterids
- Order: Apiales
- Family: Apiaceae
- Genus: Thapsia
- Species: T. gummifera

Binomial name
- Thapsia gummifera (Desf.) Spreng.

Synonyms
- Laserpitium gummiferum Desf.; Margotia gummifera (Desf.) Lange; Margotia laserpitioides Boiss.

= Thapsia gummifera =

Species of flowering plant

Thapsia gummifera (syn. Margotia gummifera) is a species of flowering plant in the family Apiaceae, native to the western Mediterranean; Portugal, Spain, Morocco, Algeria, and Tunisia. It has been proposed as a candidate for the plant known in antiquity as silphium and gone extinct in Libya in the 5th century.
