= Thapsigargin =

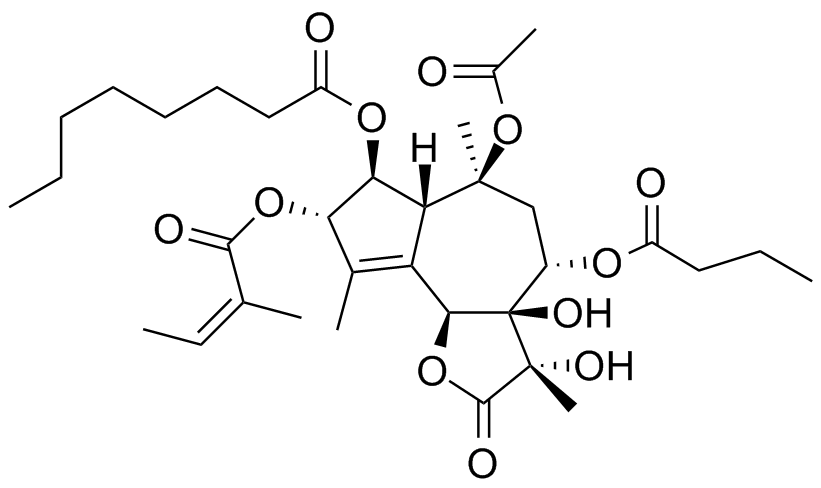
- Thapsigargin

Names
- IUPAC name (11S)-7,11-Dihydroxy-12-oxo-6β,12-epoxy-1β,7α,10α-guai-4-ene-2β,3α,8α,10-tetrayl 10-acetate 8-butanoate 3-[(2Z)-2-methylbut-2-enoate] 2-octanoate
- Systematic IUPAC name (3S,3aR,4S,6S,6aR,7S,8S,9bS)-3,3a-Dihydroxy-3,6,9-trimethyl-2-oxo-2,3,3a,4,5,6,6a,7,8,9b-decahydroazuleno[4,5-b]furan-4,6,7,8-tetrayl 6-acetate 4-butanoate 8-[(2Z)-2-methylbut-2-enoate] 7-octanoate

Identifiers
| CAS Number | 67526-95-8 |
| 3D model (JSmol) | Interactive image |
| ChEBI | CHEBI:9516 |
| ChEMBL | ChEMBL96926 |
| ChemSpider | 393753 |
| ECHA InfoCard | 100.116.539 |
| IUPHAR/BPS | 5351 |
| PubChem CID | 446378 |
| UNII | Z96BQ26RZD |
| CompTox Dashboard (EPA) | DTXSID5040621 |
- InChI: InChI=1S/C34H50O12/c1-9-12-13-14-15-17-24(37)43-28-26-25(20(5)27(28)44-30(38)19(4)11-3)29-34(41,33(8,40)31(39)45-29)22(42-23(36)16-10-2)18-32(26,7)46-21(6)35/h11,22,26-29,40-41H,9-10,12-18H2,1-8H3/b19-11-/t22-,26+,27-,28-,29-,32-,33+,34+/m0/s1 Key: IXFPJGBNCFXKPI-FSIHEZPISA-N; InChI=1/C34H50O12/c1-9-12-13-14-15-17-24(37)43-28-26-25(20(5)27(28)44-30(38)19(4)11-3)29-34(41,33(8,40)31(39)45-29)22(42-23(36)16-10-2)18-32(26,7)46-21(6)35/h11,22,26-29,40-41H,9-10,12-18H2,1-8H3/b19-11-/t22-,26+,27-,28-,29-,32-,33+,34+/m0/s1 Key: IXFPJGBNCFXKPI-FSIHEZPIBR
- SMILES: O=C3O[C@H]2C\1=C(\[C@H](OC(=O)\C(=C/C)C)[C@@H](OC(=O)CCCCCCC)[C@@H]/1[C@@](OC(=O)C)(C[C@H](OC(=O)CCC)[C@]2(O)[C@@]3(O)C)C)C

Properties
| Chemical formula | C_{34}H_{50}O_{12} |
| Molar mass | 650.762 g·mol^{−1} |
- Except where otherwise noted, data are given for materials in their standard state (at 25 °C [77 °F], 100 kPa). verify (what is ?) Infobox references

Thapsigargin is a non-competitive inhibitor of sarcoplasmic reticulum/endoplasmic reticulum Ca^{2+} ATPase (SERCA). Structurally, thapsigargin is classified as a guaianolide, and is extracted from a plant, Thapsia garganica. It is a tumor promoter in mammalian cells.

Thapsigargin raises cytosolic (intracellular) calcium concentration by blocking the ability of the cell to pump calcium into the sarcoplasmic and endoplasmic reticula. Store-depletion can secondarily activate plasma membrane calcium channels, allowing an influx of calcium into the cytosol. Depletion of ER calcium stores leads to ER stress and activation of the unfolded protein response. Non-resolved ER stress can cumulatively lead to cell death. Prolonged store depletion can protect against ferroptosis via remodeling of ER-synthesized phospholipids.

Thapsigargin treatment and the resulting ER calcium depletion inhibits autophagy independent of the UPR.

Thapsigargin is useful in experimentation examining the impacts of increasing cytosolic calcium concentrations and ER calcium depletion.

== Biosynthesis ==
The complete biosynthesis of thapsigargin has yet to be elucidated. A proposed biosynthesis starts with the farnesyl pyrophosphate. The first step is controlled by the enzyme germacrene B synthase. In the second step, the C(8) position is easily activated for an allylic oxidation due to the position of the double bond. The next step is the addition of the acyloxy moiety by a P450 acetyltransferase; which is a well known reaction for the synthesis of the diterpene, taxol. In the third step, the lactone ring is formed by a cytochrome P450 enzyme using NADP^{+}. With the butyloxy group on the C(8), the formation will only generate the 6,12-lactone ring. The fourth step is an epoxidation that initiates the last step of the base guaianolide formation. In the fifth step, a P450 enzyme closes the 5 + 7 guaianolide structure. The ring closing is important, because it will proceed via 1,10 - epoxidation in order to retain the 4,5 - double bond needed in thapsigargin. It is not known whether the secondary modifications to the guaianolide occur before, or after the formation of thapsigargin, but will need to be considered when elucidating the true biosynthesis. It should also be noted, that several of these enzymes are P450s, therefore oxygen and NADPH are likely crucial to this biosynthesis as well as other cofactors such as Mg^{2+} and Mn^{2+} may be needed.

== Research ==
Since inhibition of SERCA is a mechanism of action that has been used to target solid tumors, thapsigargin has attracted research interest. A prodrug of thapsigargin, mipsagargin, is currently undergoing clinical trials for the treatment of glioblastoma.

The biological activity has also attracted research into the laboratory synthesis of thapsigargin. To date, three distinct syntheses have been reported: one by Steven V. Ley, one by Phil Baran., and one by P. Andrew Evans.

Preclinical studies demonstrated that other effects of thapsigargin include suppression of nicotinic acetylcholine receptors activity in neurons of the guinea-pig ileum submucous plexus and rat superior cervical ganglion.

Laboratory studies at the University of Nottingham, using in vitro cell cultures, indicates possible potential as a broad spectrum antiviral, with activity against the COVID-19 virus (SARS-CoV-2), a common cold virus, respiratory syncytial virus (RSV), and the influenza A virus.

== See also ==
- Tigilanol tiglate
