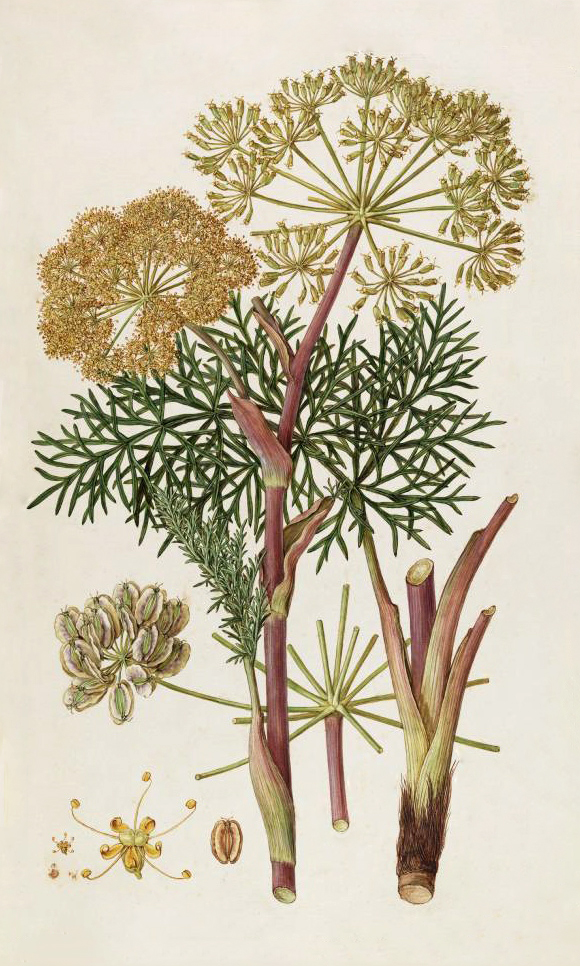

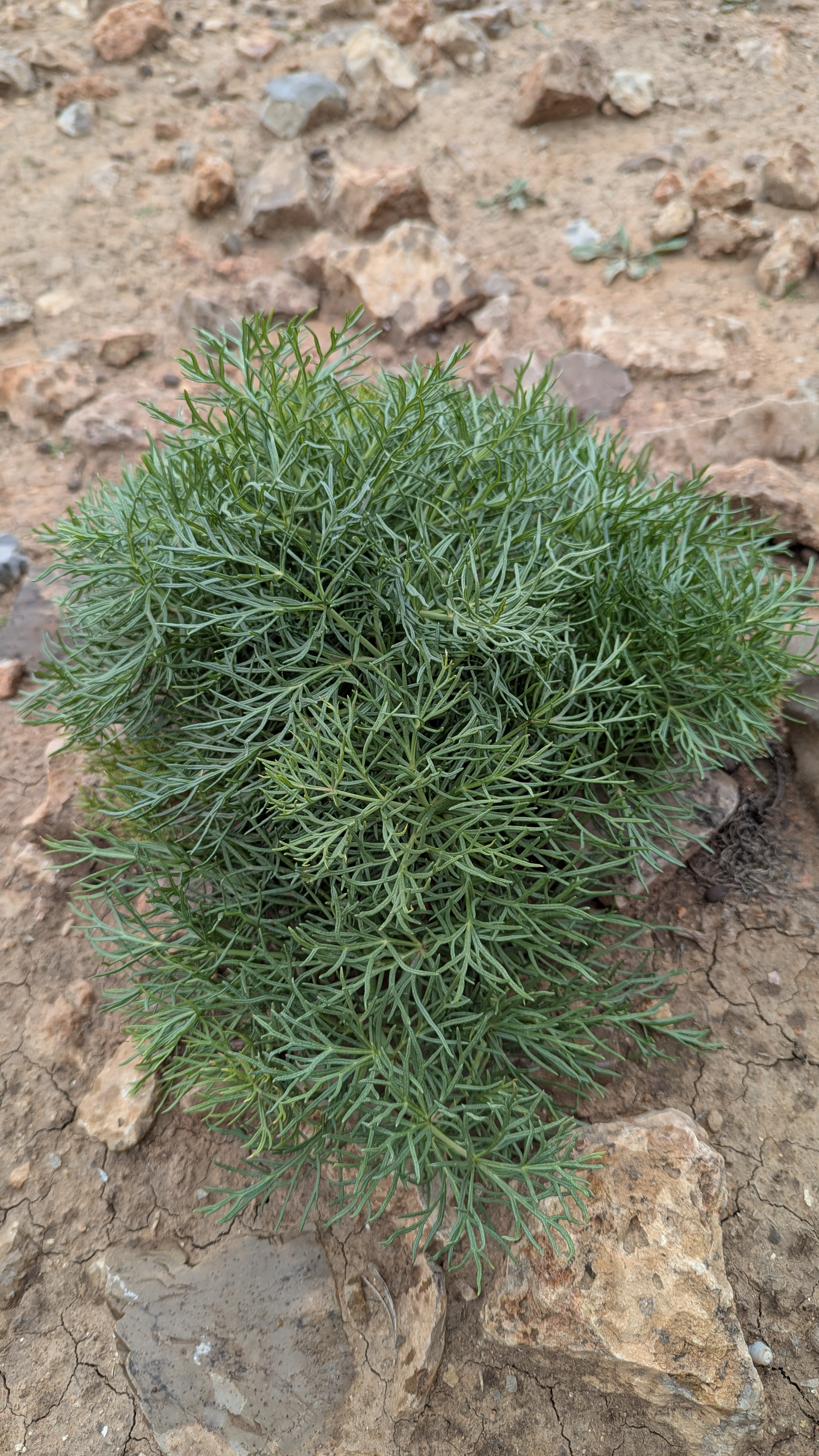

Scientific classification
- Kingdom: Plantae
- Clade: Tracheophytes
- Clade: Angiosperms
- Clade: Eudicots
- Clade: Asterids
- Order: Apiales
- Family: Apiaceae
- Genus: Thapsia
- Species: T. garganica

Binomial name
- Thapsia garganica L. (1767)

Subspecies
- Thapsia garganica subsp. garganica; Thapsia garganica subsp. messanensis (Guss.) Brullo, Guglielmo, Pasta, Pavone & Salmeri

= Thapsia garganica =

Italian Thapsia

Genus of flowering plants

Thapsia garganica, the italian thapsia, deadly carrots, or drias plant, is a species of flowering plant in the carrot family, Apiaceae. It is a perennial native to the Mediterranean Basin, including Portugal, Spain, Italy, Greece, Turkey, Algeria, Tunisia, and Libya.

Two subspecies are accepted.

- Thapsia garganica subsp. garganica – Algeria, Greece, Italy, Libya, Portugal, Spain, Tunisia, and Turkey
- Thapsia garganica subsp. messanensis (Guss.) Brullo, Guglielmo, Pasta, Pavone & Salmeri – Sicily
