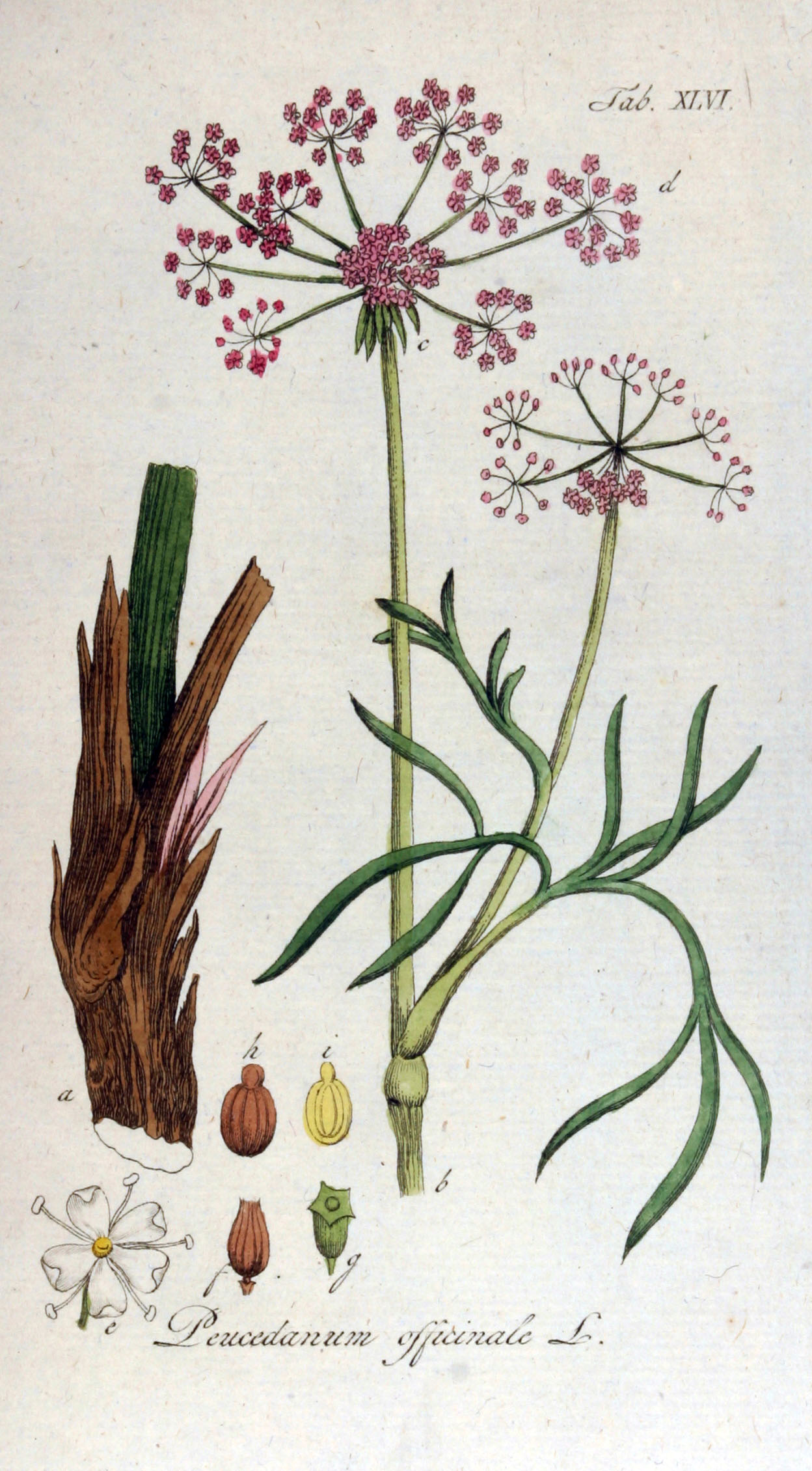
- Peucedanum officinale

Scientific classification
- Kingdom: Plantae
- Clade: Tracheophytes
- Clade: Angiosperms
- Clade: Eudicots
- Clade: Asterids
- Order: Apiales
- Family: Apiaceae
- Subfamily: Apioideae
- Tribe: Selineae
- Genus: Peucedanum; L.

Type species
- Peucedanum officinale L.

Species
- See text

Synonyms
- Alvardia Fenzl; Analyrium E.Mey. ex C.Presl; Angelium (Rchb.) Opiz; Apseudes Raf.; Archemora DC.; Calestania Koso-Pol.; Cervaria Wolf; Elaeochytris Fenzl; Eulophus Nutt.; Imperatoria L.; Libanotis Hill; Macroselinum Schur; Oreoselinum Mill.; Oreoselis Raf.; Ormosolenia Tausch; Ostruthium Link; Peucedanon St.-Lag.; Pteroselinum Rchb.; Selinum L.; Thyselium Raf.; Thysselinum Adans.; Tommasinia Bertol.; Xanthoselinum Schur

= Peucedanum =

Genus of flowering plants

Peucedanum is a genus of flowering plant in the carrot family, Apiaceae. Peucedanum boasts a global presence with diverse spread of morphological features. Peucedanum species are characterized by dorsally compressed mericarps, slightly prominent dorsal ribs, narrowly winged lateral ribs, and a broad commissure. However, the vast diversity of morphology, fruit forms, and phytochemical production makes classifying species in the Peucedanum challenging. Historically relevant in traditional medicine, Peucedanum's taxonomic complexity arises from its extensive diversity.

Peucedanum's taxonomy is being reshaped by novel genomic insights, prompting ongoing revisions with promising implications for ethnopharmacological research and the broader understanding of plant biodiversity. These efforts hold potential for advancements in therapeutic discoveries and contribute to the ecological significance of this globally diverse genus.

== Taxonomy ==
Recent genomic analyses have indicated Peucedanum's non-monophyletic nature, prompting revisions in its taxonomic classification. Once considered among the largest genera of the Apiaceae, taxonomic revisions, informed by genomic and phytochemical analyses, have reduced the estimated number of Peucedanum species to approximately 74. Molecular phylogenetic studies have identified fifteen mutation hotspots in the Peucedanum genome, providing potential markers for accurate species classification. Ongoing taxonomic revisions, guided by genetic insights, aim to enhance accuracy and facilitate the discovery of new Peucedanum species.

=== Species ===
As of November 2025, Plants of the World Online accepted the following species:

- Peucedanum adae Woronow
- Peucedanum akaliniae Akpulat, Gürdal & Tuncay
- Peucedanum alpinum (Sieber ex Schult.) B.L.Burtt & P.H.Davis
- Peucedanum alsaticum L.
- Peucedanum ampliatum K.T.Fu
- Peucedanum anamallayense C.B.Clarke
- Peucedanum austriacum (Jacq.) W.D.J.Koch
- Peucedanum autumnale (J.Thiébaut) Bernardi
- Peucedanum belutschistanicum H.Wolff
- Peucedanum cervaria (L.) Lapeyr.
- Peucedanum cervariifolium C.A.Mey.
- Peucedanum ceylanicum Gardner
- Peucedanum chujaense K.Kim, S.H.Oh, Chan S.Kim & C.W.Park
- Peucedanum cordatum Balf.f.
- Peucedanum coreanum Nakai
- Peucedanum coriaceum Rchb.
- Peucedanum dehradunense Babu
- Peucedanum dhana Buch.-Ham. ex C.B.Clarke
- Peucedanum dielsianum Fedde ex H.Wolff
- Peucedanum dissolutum (Diels) H.Wolff
- Peucedanum gabrielae R.Frey
- Peucedanum gallicum Latourr.
- Peucedanum guangxiense R.H.Shan & M.L.Sheh
- Peucedanum guvenianum Yıldırım & H.Duman
- Peucedanum harry-smithii Fedde ex H.Wolff
- Peucedanum henryi H.Wolff
- Peucedanum hispanicum (Boiss.) Endl.
- Peucedanum huangshanense Lu Q.Huang, H.S.Peng & S.S.Chu
- Peucedanum hyrcanicum H.Gholiz., Naqinezhad & Mozaff.
- Peucedanum insolens Kitag.
- Peucedanum japonicum Thunb.
- Peucedanum lancifolium Lange
- Peucedanum latifolium (M.Bieb.) DC.
- Peucedanum longshengense R.H.Shan & M.L.Sheh
- Peucedanum lowei (Coss.) Menezes
- Peucedanum mashanense R.H.Shan & M.L.Sheh
- Peucedanum medicum Dunn
- Peucedanum miroense K.Kim, H.J.Suh & J.H.Song
- Peucedanum morisonii Besser ex Schult.
- Peucedanum muliense M.L.Sheh
- Peucedanum multivittatum Maxim.
- Peucedanum nagpurense (C.B.Clarke) Prain
- Peucedanum nanum R.H.Shan & M.L.Sheh
- Peucedanum nepalense P.K.Mukh.
- Peucedanum officinale L.
- Peucedanum oreoselinum (L.) Moench
- Peucedanum ostruthium (L.) W.D.J.Koch
- Peucedanum ozhatayiorum Akpulat & Akalın
- Peucedanum palustre (L.) Moench
- Peucedanum parkinsonii Fedde ex H.Wolff
- Peucedanum pimenovii Mozaff.
- Peucedanum pradeepianum K.M.P.Kumar, Hareesh & Balach.
- Peucedanum puberulum (Turcz.) Turcz. ex Schischk.
- Peucedanum rablense (Wulfen) W.D.J.Koch
- Peucedanum rochelianum Heuff.
- Peucedanum ruthenicum M.Bieb.
- Peucedanum sandwicense Hillebr.
- Peucedanum shanianum F.L.Chen & Y.F.Deng
- Peucedanum siamicum Craib
- Peucedanum songpanense R.H.Shan & F.T.Pu
- Peucedanum tauricum M.Bieb.
- Peucedanum tongkangense K.Kim, H.J.Suh & J.H.Song
- Peucedanum vaginatum Ledeb.
- Peucedanum vasudevanii K.M.P.Kumar, Rampradeep, Hareesh, Jabeena & Maya
- Peucedanum venetum (Spreng.) W.D.J.Koch
- Peucedanum verticillare (L.) W.D.J.Koch ex DC.
- Peucedanum violaceum R.H.Shan & M.L.Sheh
- Peucedanum vogelianum Emb. & Maire
- Peucedanum vourinense (Leute) Hartvig
- Peucedanum wawrae (H.Wolff) S.W.Su ex M.L.Sheh
- Peucedanum winkleri H.Wolff
- Peucedanum wulongense R.H.Shan & M.L.Sheh
- Peucedanum yunnanense H.Wolff
- Peucedanum zedelmeierianum Manden.

=== Former species ===
Species formerly classified as Peucedanum include:

Former accepted name	Year assigned	Currently accepted name	Year reclassified	Additional synonyms in genus
Peucedanum abyssinicum Vatke	1876	Afrosciadium abyssinicum (Vatke) P.J.D.Winter	2008	Peucedanum silaifolium Hiern (1877)
Peucedanum afrum Meisn.	1987	Afrosciadium afrum (Meisn.) P.J.D.Winter	2008	Peucedanum connatum E.Mey. ex Sond. (1862); Peucedanum meisnerianum MacOwan ex Engl. (1921)
Peucedanum angustisectum (Engl.) Norman		Lefebvrea angustisecta Engl.		
Peucedanum articulatum C.C.Towns.	1987	Afrosciadium articulatum (C.C.Towns.) P.J.D.Winter	2008	
Peucedanum camerunense Jacq.-Fél.		Lefebvrea angustisecta Engl.		
Peucedanum dispersum C.C.Towns.	1987	Afrosciadium dispersum (C.C.Towns.) P.J.D.Winter	2008	
Peucedanum dissectum (C.H.Wright) Dawe, nom. illeg.	1906	Afrosciadium kerstenii (Engl.) P.J.D.Winter	2008	
Peucedanum englerianum H.Wolff	1927	Afrosciadium englerianum (H.Wolff) P.J.D.Winter	2008	
Peucedanum eylesii C.Norman	1932	Afrosciadium eylesii (C.Norman) P.J.D.Winter	2008	
Peucedanum falcaria Turcz.	1832	Haloselinum falcaria (Turcz.) Pimenov	2012	Peucedanum pricei N.D.Simpson (1913); Peucedanum salsugineum Krylov (1903)
Peucedanum friesiorum H.Wolff	1927	Afrosciadium friesiorum (H.Wolff) P.J.D.Winter	2008	Peucedanum aberderense H.Wolff (1927)
Peucedanum galbanum (L.) Magee	1898	Notobubon galbanum (L.) Drude	2008	Peucedanum galbanum var. dentatum Kuntze (1898); Peucedanum galbanum var. incisodentatum Kuntze (1898); Peucedanum rhombifolium Stokes (1812)
Peucedanum gossweileri C.Norman	1922	Afrosciadium gossweileri (C.Norman) P.J.D.Winter	2008	
Peucedanum harmsianum H.Wolff	1927	Afrosciadium harmsianum (H.Wolff) P.J.D.Winter	2008	Peucedanum canaliculatum Verdc. (1954)
Peucedanum kerstenii Engl.	1894	Afrosciadium kerstenii (Engl.) P.J.D.Winter	2008	Peucedanum dissectum (C.H.Wright) Dawe (1906); Peucedanum mildbraedii H.Wolff (1912); Peucedanum wrightii M.Hiroe (1979)
Peucedanum kupense I.Darbysh. & Cheek		Lefebvrea angustisecta Engl.		
Peucedanum ledebourielloides K.T.Fu	1981	Pseudopeucedanum ledebourielloides (K.T.Fu) C.K.Liu & X.J.He	2023	
Peucedanum lundense Cannon	1970	Afrosciadium lundense (Cannon) P.J.D.Winter	2008	
Peucedanum lynesii C.Norman	1936	Afrosciadium lynesii (C.Norman) P.J.D.Winter	2008	
Peucedanum magalismontanum Sond.	1862	Afrosciadium magalismontanum (Sond.) P.J.D.Winter	2008	Peucedanum schlechteri Engl. (1921); Peucedanum schlechterianum H.Wolff (1912)
Peucedanum natalense (Sond.) Engl.	1921	Afrosciadium natalense (Sond.) P.J.D.Winter	2008	
Peucedanum nyassicum H.Wolff	1912	Afrosciadium nyassicum (H.Wolff) P.J.D.Winter	2008	Peucedanum doctoris C.Norman (1928) Peucedanum monticola C.Norman (1928)
Peucedanum silaus L.	1753	Silaum silaus (L.) Schinz & Thell.	1915	
Peucedanum platycarpum Sond.	1862	Afrosciadium platycarpum (Sond.) P.J.D.Winter	2008	
Peucedanum rhodesicum Cannon	1976	Afrosciadium rhodesicum (Cannon) P.J.D.Winter	2008	
Peucedanum trisectum C.C.Towns.	1976	Afrosciadium trisectum (C.C.Towns.) P.J.D.Winter	2008	

== Distribution ==
Spanning from Madeira to the Hawaiian islands, Peucedanum's expansive geographical range has necessitated reclassification of African Peucedanoid species based on nuanced taxonomy incorporating genetic, morphological, habit, and seasonality considerations.

== Medicinal potential ==
Peucedanum's medicinal significance, especially in treating antimicrobial-resistant infections, underscores the need for accurate taxonomy. Species like Peucedanum graveolens, Peucedanum japonicum, and Peucedanum ostruthium exhibit antimicrobial properties, suggesting potential as alternative treatments as a compliment to antibiotics in combating antibiotic-resistant pathogens.
