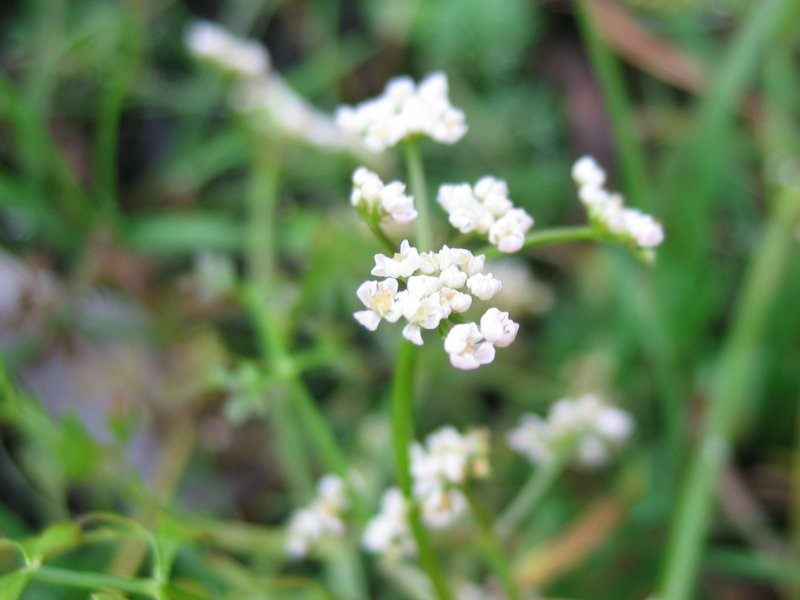

Scientific classification
- Kingdom: Plantae
- Clade: Embryophytes
- Clade: Tracheophytes
- Clade: Spermatophytes
- Clade: Angiosperms
- Clade: Eudicots
- Clade: Asterids
- Order: Apiales
- Family: Apiaceae
- Genus: Peucedanum
- Species: P. palustre

Binomial name
- Peucedanum palustre (L.) Moench

Synonyms
- Selinum palustre L.; Thysselium palustre (L.) Hoffm.

= Peucedanum palustre =

Species of flowering plant

Peucedanum palustre (milk-parsley) is an almost glabrous biennial plant in the family Apiaceae. It is so called in English because of the thin, foetid, milky latex found in its young parts and is native to most of Europe, extending eastwards to Central Asia. Another English common name for the plant is marsh hog's fennel (hog's fennel (unqualified) and sea hog's fennel, by contrast, are common names of Peucedanum officinale, a perennial species in the same genus, found in drier habitats, but having similar medicinal properties).

Peucedanum palustre grows (as its specific name implies) in wetlands, shallow water at the margins of rivers and estuaries and occasionally in ditches and other smaller water features. It is relatively shade-tolerant and requires seasonal submerging of the site to compete with other plants. It is well-known to lepidopterists as the main foodplant of the Old World swallowtail.

Cambridge milk parsley is the common English name of a different plant: Selinum carvifolia - also an umbellifer, but belonging to a different genus. The two plants are not only similar in appearance, but also grow in similar habitats, although they may be told apart in the following manner: P. palustre has hollow, often purplish stems, pinnatifid leaf lobes and deflexed bracteoles; while S. carvifolia has solid, greenish stems, entire or sometimes lobed leaf-lobes and erecto-patent bracteoles. Also, when the two plants are in fruit, another difference becomes apparent: the three dorsal ridges on the fruit of S. carvifolia are winged, while those on the fruit of P. palustre are not.

The roots of Peucedanum palustre have been used as a substitute for ginger in Southeastern Europe and likewise in Russia. The English botanist John Lindley (under the heading Peucedanum montanum) also mentions the use of the root as an antiepileptic in the region of Courland in western Latvia (with its low-lying character, marshy coastline and numerous lakes, an area conducive to the growth of the plant).
