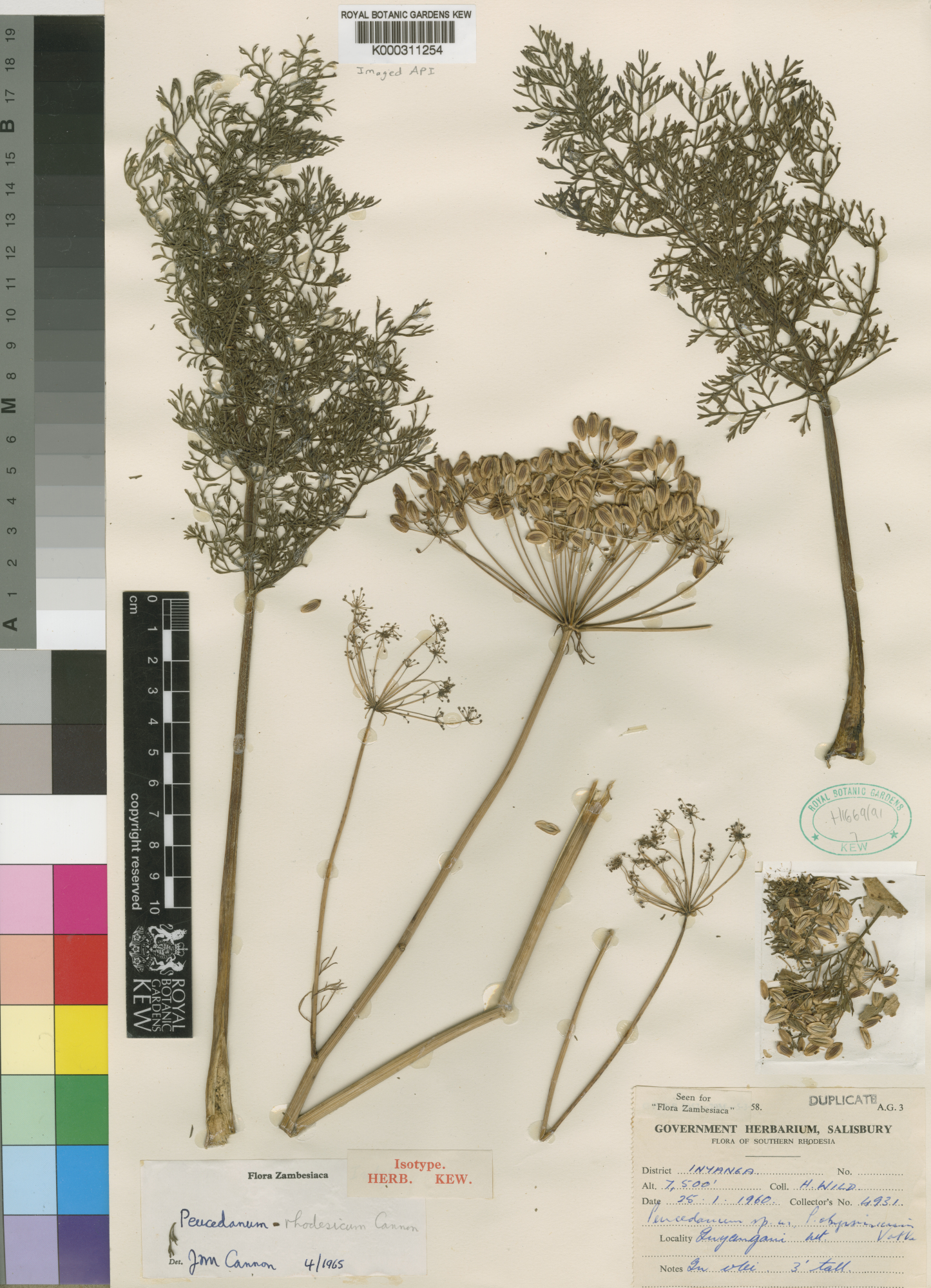

Conservation status
- Vulnerable (IUCN 3.1)

Scientific classification
- Kingdom: Plantae
- Clade: Tracheophytes
- Clade: Angiosperms
- Clade: Eudicots
- Clade: Asterids
- Order: Apiales
- Family: Apiaceae
- Genus: Afrosciadium
- Species: A. rhodesicum

Binomial name
- Afrosciadium rhodesicum (Cannon) P.J.D.Winter (2008)

Synonyms
- Peucedanum rhodesicum Cannon (1976)

= Afrosciadium rhodesicum =

Species of flowering plant

Afrosciadium rhodesicum is a member of the carrot family, Apiaceae. It is a perennial tuberous herb, endemic to the Mount Nyangani region along the border between eastern Zimbabwe and western Mozambique.

Afrosciadium rhodesicum was previously classified as Peucedanum rhodesicum before the genus Afrosciadium was established in 2008.

Afrosciadium rhodesicum grows between 1 and 1.5 meters high, and possesses small, yellow-green flowers.
