= Frederick Eyles =

Rhodesian botanist (1864–1937)

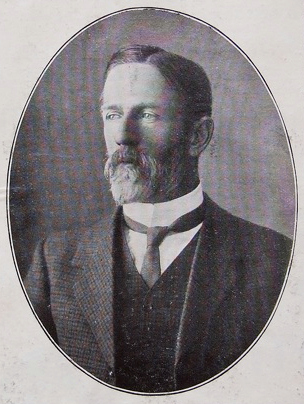

Frederick Eyles (10 May 1864, Wick, Gloucestershire - 28 May 1937, Gatooma, Southern Rhodesia) was an English-born Rhodesian botanist, politician and journalist. The standard author abbreviation Eyles is used to indicate this person as the author when citing a botanical name.

== Career ==
Eyles was probably resident in Natal for some time, since J.C. Juta & Co. published his book, Zulu Self-Taught, in Cape Town in 1900. Another edition was published in Johannesburg in the same year. He arrived in Rhodesia in January 1899, choosing to settle in Bulawayo and founding "The Bulawayo Observer" in August 1902. He acted as editor for this weekly, which reported on political and financial news, until its demise in January 1904. In 1910 he relocated to the vicinity of Mazoe, a village north of Salisbury, and stayed on the farm "Tatagura: for a number of years. From 1911 to 1914 he served on the Legislative Council as a representative of the Northern Districts. In 1914 he joined the civil service, carrying out the duties of statistician and water registrar in the Department of Agriculture. Some time later he became associated with the Census office and compiled the report of the director of census dealing with the European census taken on 3 May 1921.

== Scientific endeavors ==
Eyles' scientific interests were wide-ranging, as shown by his contributions to the Rhodesia Scientific Association, of which he became a member in its founding year of 1899, and was elected president for 1922/3. At first Eyles collected insects, being particularly fond of the Coleoptera or beetles, a selection of which he presented to the Association's museum in 1900. The following year his interest had been captured by prehistory, so that in March 1901 he wrote a paper on "The origin of the native races of South Africa", a collation from various philological and anthropological sources - this work was published in the Proceedings (Vol. 2, pp. 30–42). His next contribution, "On a cave with Bushman drawings in the Matopos" (Ibid, Vol. 3, pp. 65–69), was presented in November 1902, and included descriptions of ancient stone artefacts from the cave. Other papers such as "The collection of natural history specimens" (Ibid, 1903, Vol. 4, pp. 33–37) and "Notes on the habits of a young genet" (Ibid, 1907, Vol. 7, pp. 25–28) reflected his deep interest in natural history.

At about this time Eyles found his attention gradually shifting to botany, writing and presenting a paper on "Ferns and fern allies of Southern Rhodesia" in April 1906. (Proceedings, Vol. 6, pp. 87–91). The following year he announced that he was compiling a catalogue of Rhodesian plants, to which end he had put together an extensive herbarium. Indeed, for the remainder of his life he concentrated on Rhodesian flora, culminating in the publication of "A record of plants collected in Southern Rhodesia", issued in the Transactions of the Royal Society of South Africa (1916, Vol. 5, pp. 273–564), laying the foundation for study of the Zimbabwean flora. He also published two papers in the South African Journal of Science: "Constituents of the flora of Southern Rhodesia" (1920, Vol. 17, pp. 181–184) and "Ecological notes on the flora of Salisbury commonage" (1927, Vol. 24, pp. 289–298).

In 1923 he was appointed Department of Agriculture botanist and mycologist, spending six months at the University of Stellenbosch where he studied mycology and plant pathology under P.A. van der Bijl. Back in Rhodesia he published a list of plant diseases in 1926. The following year the mycological side of his work was transferred to John Collier Frederick Hopkins, while he carried on as the departmental botanist. While working for the Department of Agriculture he edited the Rhodesia Agricultural Journal, producing articles such as "Diseases of cotton in Southern Rhodesia" (1924) and "Some diseases of tobacco in Rhodesia" (1924).

In 1928 he became curator of the Queen Victoria Memorial Museum and Library in Salisbury. He died of pneumonia contracted on a collecting trip to the Gatooma district, and was survived by his wife, Ann Eyles.

EYLES, FREDERICK, of Bulawayo, Rhodesia, and of the Bulawayo Club, and member of the Anthropological Institute, Folk Lore Society, S. A. Philosophical Society, and Rhodesia Scientific Association (formerly Hon. Sec.), was born at Wick, near Bath, May 10, 1864; is the author of a work on Zulu Grammar, "Zulu Self-taught" (Juta & Co., 1900), and is the editor and founder of the Bulawayo Observer. Mr. Eyles was married May 17, 1893.

— Walter H. Wills, The Anglo-African Who's Who and Biographical Sketch-book

=== Learned societies ===
Eyles became a Fellow of the Linnean Society. In 1903 he joined the South African Philosophical Society and remained a member of its successor, the Royal Society of South Africa. In 1906 he joined the South African Association for the Advancement of Science, serving as president of its Section C (which included botany) at the association's annual congress in Bulawayo in 1911. In his presidential address he presented "A preliminary list of the plants of Southern Rhodesia" (Report, 1911, pp. 277–321). He was still a member of the association's council in 1926. In 1916 he became a foundation member of the South African Biological Society.

== Legacy ==
During the period 1901 to 1937, he collected some 9,000 botanical specimens which were lodged in the Government Herbarium and the National Botanic Gardens, with duplicate sets at Kew, the British Museum and the National Herbarium in Pretoria. His collection of fungi were kept at the Department of Agriculture in Salisbury, and at the Mycological Herbarium at Pretoria. His 1932 list of Rhodesian fungi was later incorporated in a list by J.C.F. Hopkins in 1938.

Species named in his honour include Digitaria eylesii C.E.Hubb., Indigofera eylesiana J.B.Gillett, Barleria eylesii S.Moore, Isoglossa eylesii (S.Moore) Brummitt, Rhus eylesii Hutch., Afrosciadium eylesii (C.Norman) P.J.D.Winter, Euphorbia eylesii Rendle, Aspidoglossum eylesii (S.Moore) Kupicha, Pavetta eylesii S.Moore and Gutenbergia eylesii (S.Moore) Wild & G.V.Pope.
