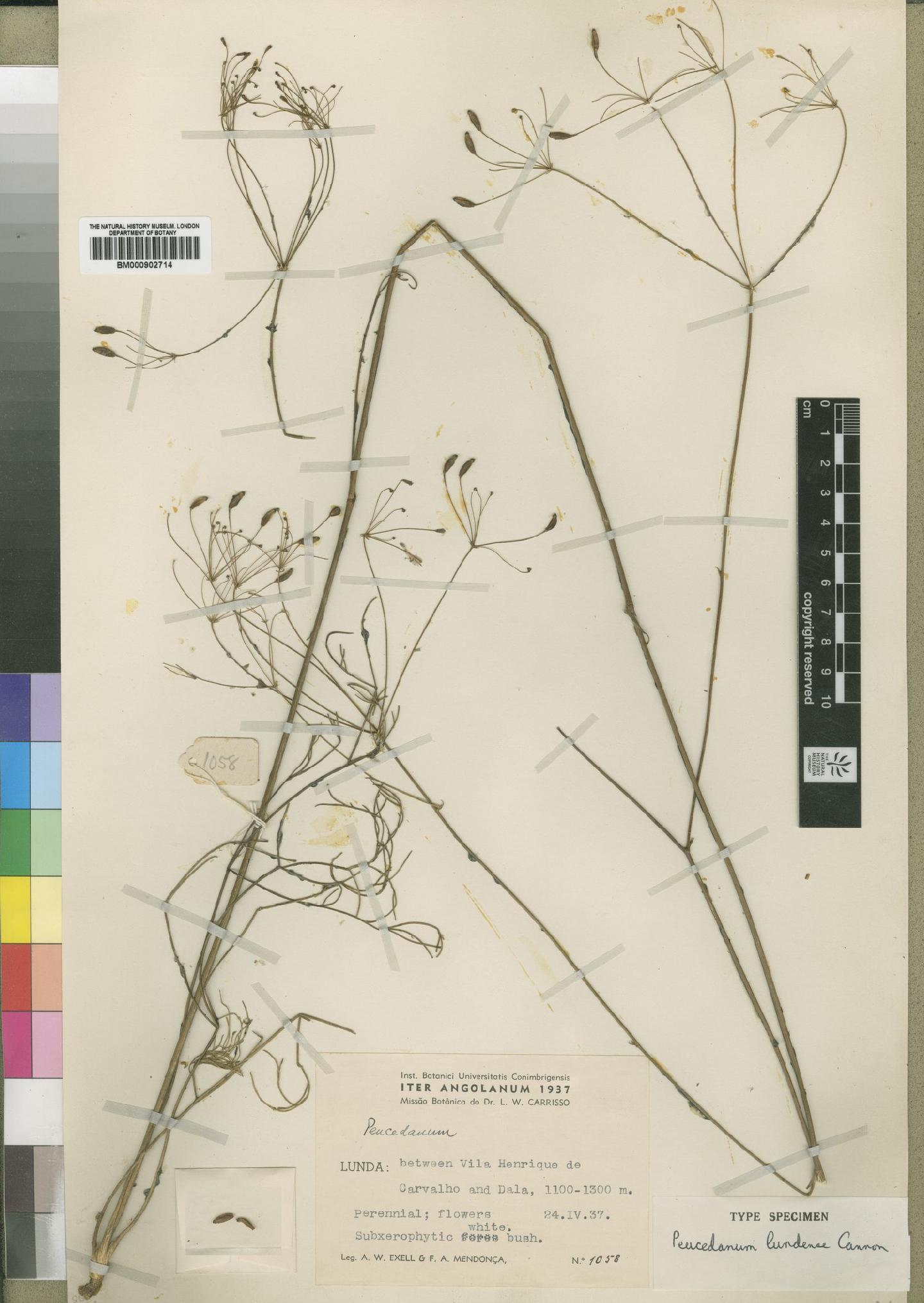

Scientific classification
- Kingdom: Plantae
- Clade: Tracheophytes
- Clade: Angiosperms
- Clade: Eudicots
- Clade: Asterids
- Order: Apiales
- Family: Apiaceae
- Genus: Afrosciadium
- Species: A. lundense

Binomial name
- Afrosciadium lundense (Cannon) P.J.D.Winter (2008)

Synonyms
- Peucedanum lundense Cannon (1970)

= Afrosciadium lundense =

Species of flowering plant

Afrosciadium lundense is a member of the carrot family, Apiaceae. It is a perennial tuberous herb, endemic to subtropical Angola.

Afrosciadium lundense was previously classified as Peucedanum lundense before the genus Afrosciadium was established in 2008.
