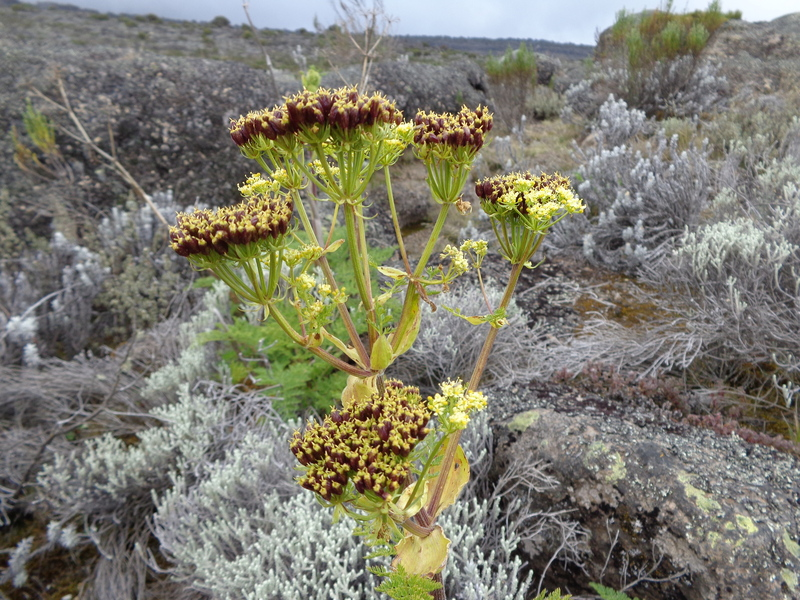
- Afrosciadium kerstenii growing on the slopes of Mount Kilimanjaro in Tanzania

Scientific classification
- Kingdom: Plantae
- Clade: Tracheophytes
- Clade: Angiosperms
- Clade: Eudicots
- Clade: Asterids
- Order: Apiales
- Family: Apiaceae
- Subfamily: Apioideae
- Tribe: Tordylieae
- Genus: Afrosciadium; P.J.D.Winter

Type species
- Afrosciadium harmsianum

= Afrosciadium =

Genus of flowering plants

Afrosciadium is a genus of flowering plants belonging to the carrot family, Apiaceae. It was split from the genus Peucedanum in 2008 by P.J.D. Winter, et al.

Its native range is Tropical and Southern Africa.

Species:

- Afrosciadium abyssinicum (Vatke) P.J.D.Winter
- Afrosciadium afrum (Meisn.) P.J.D.Winter
- Afrosciadium articulatum (C.C.Towns.) P.J.D.Winter
- Afrosciadium dispersum (C.C.Towns.) P.J.D.Winter
- Afrosciadium englerianum (H.Wolff) P.J.D.Winter
- Afrosciadium eylesii (C.Norman) P.J.D.Winter
- Afrosciadium friesiorum (H.Wolff) P.J.D.Winter
- Afrosciadium gossweileri (C.Norman) P.J.D.Winter
- Afrosciadium harmsianum (H.Wolff) P.J.D.Winter
- Afrosciadium kerstenii (Engl.) P.J.D.Winter
- Afrosciadium lundense (Cannon) P.J.D.Winter
- Afrosciadium lynesii (C.Norman) P.J.D.Winter
- Afrosciadium magalismontanum (Sond.) P.J.D.Winter
- Afrosciadium natalense (Sond.) P.J.D.Winter
- Afrosciadium nyassicum (H.Wolff) P.J.D.Winter
- Afrosciadium platycarpum (Sond.) P.J.D.Winter
- Afrosciadium rhodesicum (Cannon) P.J.D.Winter
- Afrosciadium trisectum (C.C.Towns.) P.J.D.Winter
