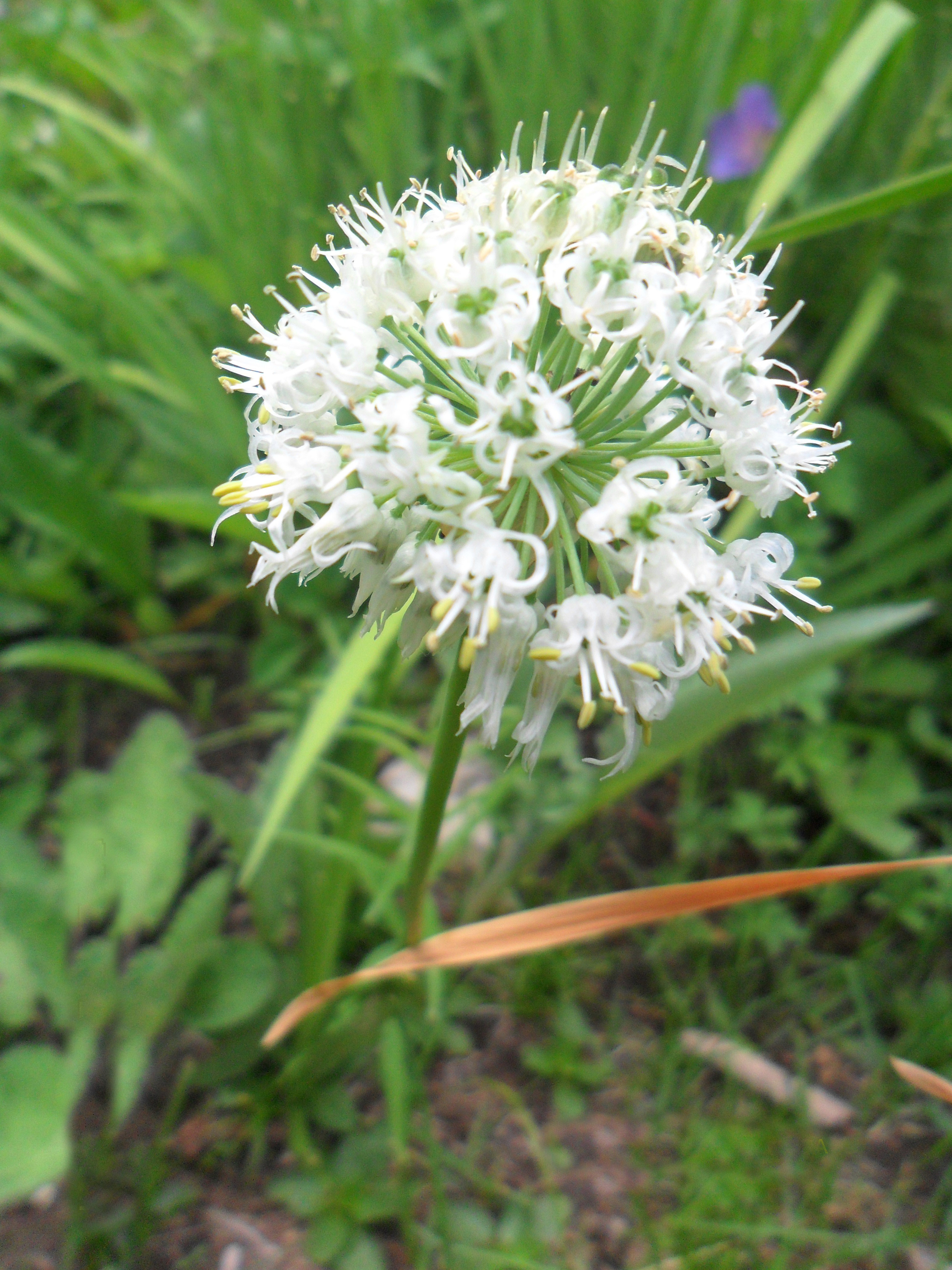

Scientific classification
- Kingdom: Plantae
- Clade: Tracheophytes
- Clade: Angiosperms
- Clade: Monocots
- Order: Asparagales
- Family: Amaryllidaceae
- Subfamily: Allioideae
- Genus: Allium
- Species: A. fasciculatum

Binomial name
- Allium fasciculatum Rendle

Synonyms
- Allium gageanum W.W. Sm.

= Allium fasciculatum =

粗根韭 cu gen jiu

Species of plant

Allium fasciculatum is a species of onions known from the Himalayas of Bhutan, Sikkim, Nepal, and the Chinese provinces of Qinghai, Sichuan and Tibet. It grows at elevations of 2200–5400 m.

Allium fasciculatum has thick roots and fibrous bulbs. Scapes are up to 40 cm long. Umbels are spherical with large numbers of white flowers.
