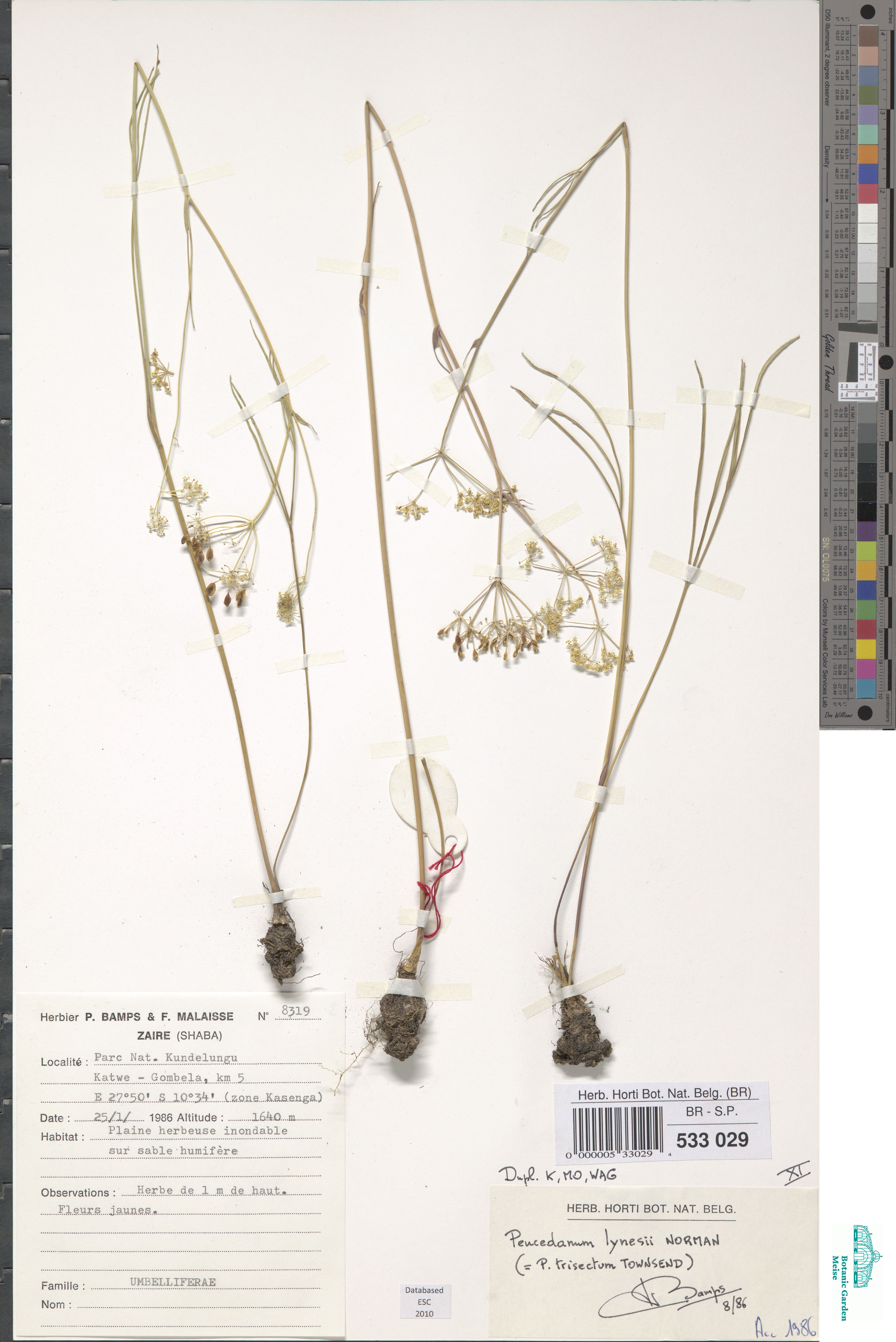

Scientific classification
- Kingdom: Plantae
- Clade: Tracheophytes
- Clade: Angiosperms
- Clade: Eudicots
- Clade: Asterids
- Order: Apiales
- Family: Apiaceae
- Genus: Afrosciadium
- Species: A. lynesii

Binomial name
- Afrosciadium lynesii (C.Norman) P.J.D.Winter (2008)

Synonyms
- Peucedanum lynesii C.Norman (1936)

= Afrosciadium lynesii =

Species of flowering plant

Afrosciadium lynesii is a member of the carrot family, Apiaceae. It is a perennial tuberous herb native to southern tropical Africa (Tanzania, Malawi, Zambia, and southern Democratic Republic of the Congo).

Afrosciadium lynesii was previously classified as Peucedanum lynesii before the genus Afrosciadium was established in 2008.

Afrosciadium lynesii is found between roughly 900 to 2,400 meters above sea level, in wooded grasslands alongside Brachystegia and Uapaca, or along rocky mountainsides. It grows to be 50 to 90 centimeters tall, with a stem roughly 2 millimeters in diameter at its base. It boasts flowers with small, elliptic petals, roughly 1 millimeter across, of a dull or green-tinged yellow color. The root may form a tuber of up to 7 centimeters long.
