= Pseudopeucedanum =

Scientific classification
- Kingdom: Plantae
- Clade: Tracheophytes
- Clade: Angiosperms
- Clade: Eudicots
- Clade: Asterids
- Order: Apiales
- Family: Apiaceae
- Subfamily: Apioideae
- Tribe: Selineae
- Genus: Pseudopeucedanum; C.K.Liu & X.J.He
- Species: P. ledebourielloides

Binomial name
- Pseudopeucedanum ledebourielloides (K.T.Fu) C.K.Liu & X.J.He

Synonyms
- Peucedanum ledebourielloides K.T.Fu

Genus of flowering plants

Pseudopeucedanum is a genus of flowering plants in the family Apiaceae. It includes a single species, Pseudopeucedanum ledebourielloides, a perennial herb native to southeastern Shaanxi and western Henan provinces in central China. It has a solitary stem which grows 40–90 cm tall from a cluster of basal leaves, with white flowers forming an umbel. It flowers from August to September and fruits from October to November. It grows in rock crevices or sandy areas in mountain valleys from 400 to 1000 meters elevation.

It is regionally important as medicinal plant, and has long been used as a substitute for the traditional Chinese herbal medicine fángfēng (Saposhnikovia divaricata).

The species was first described as Peucedanum ledebourielloides by Kun Tsun Fu in 1981. A phylogenetic and morphological study published in 2023 concluded that the species was distinct from the other species in Peucedanum, and placed the species in the newly described monotypic taxon Pseudopeucedanum.
