= Alfred Barton Rendle =

British botanist (1865–1938)

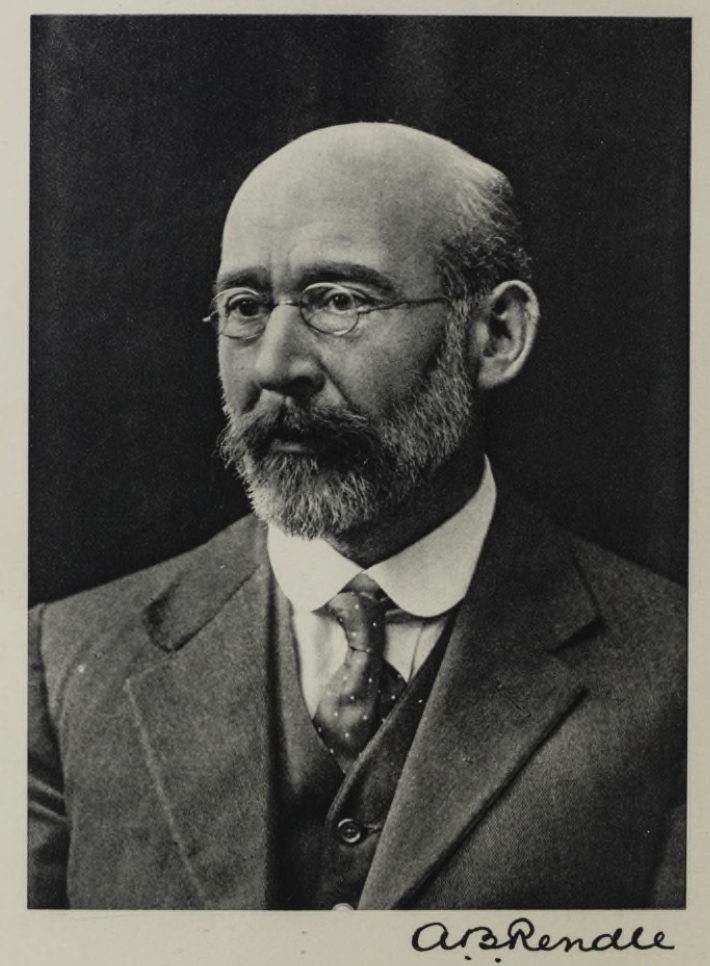
- Born: 19 January 1865; London, United Kingdom
- Died: 11 January 1938 (aged 72); Leatherhead, United Kingdom
- Education: University of London, University of Cambridge
- Awards: Fellow of the Linnean Society, 1888; President Linnean Society 1923–1927
- Scientific career
- Fields: Botany
- Workplaces: British Museum
- Author abbrev. (botany): Rendle

Alfred Barton Rendle FRS (19 January 1865 – 11 January 1938) was an English botanist. He specialized in plant taxonomy and systematics and worked at the British Museum, publishing several works on the classification of the angiosperms.

== Life and work ==
Rendle was born in Lewisham to Cornishman John Samuel and Jane Wilson Rendle. He was educated in Lewisham where he first became interested in plants, St Olave's Grammar School, Southwark and St John's College, Cambridge. He graduated with a Bachelor of Arts degree from Cambridge and Bachelor of Science from University of London in 1887. He was awarded Master of Arts degree from Cambridge in 1891 and D.Sc. degree from London in 1898. He was influenced by S. H. Vines at Cambridge for whom he worked as a demonstrator. He won scholarships from his school and universities that covered most of the cost of his education and his move from Cambridge to London was prompted by a vacancy for a salaried position as an assistant in the Botanical Department of the British Museum. This made him focus on systematic botany for his career, focusing on gymnosperms, monocotyledons, and the Apetalae. In 1894 he obtained a lectureship at The Birkbeck Institute, teaching during the evenings, a position that he enjoyed until it was closed in 1902. He was Keeper of Botany at the Natural History Museum from 1906 to 1930, in succession to George Robert Milne Murray.

In 1905, Rendle attended the International Botanical Congress in Vienna, where he was appointed on to the editorial committee for the International Rules of Botanical Nomenclature (now superseded by the International Code of Nomenclature for algae, fungi, and plants and the International Code of Nomenclature for Bacteria) a role which he continued in until 1935.

Rendle published a number of books. Perhaps the best known of these was The Classification of Flowering Plants, which saw a gap of over 20 years between the publication of its two volumes – the first was published in 1904, but readers had to wait until 1925 for volume two. This long gap was attributed by Rendle to his "increasing official and non-official duties". These included acting as botany editor for the Encyclopædia Britannica Eleventh Edition, published in 1911, editor of the Journal of Botany (1924–1938), and revising the 7th edition Handbook of British Flora (1924, author G. Bentham).

Rendle was president of the Quekett Microscopical Club from 1916 to 1921 and president of the Linnean Society from 1923 to 1927. he had been a Fellow of the Linnean Society since 1888, and was its secretary in 1916–1923. He was elected Fellow of the Royal Society in 1909.

His contemporaries considered that he had a keen sense of duty which he brought to his roles at the British Museum and contribution to the scientific community. His teaching focused on delivering fundamental knowledge to undergraduates rather than advanced study. He was sent as a delegate of the British Association to attend the 25th Indian Science Congress in 1937 but his health deteriorated upon reaching Bombay. He was forced to return and died shortly after reaching Leatherhead.

== Bibliography ==
- Stearn, William T.,The Natural History Museum at South Kensington ISBN 0-434-73600-7
- Books by A.B. Rendle at the Biodiversity Library including Flora of Jamaica coauthored with William Fawcett.
