= Keeper of Botany, Natural History Museum =

The Keeper of Botany was a position at the Natural History Museum — formerly British Museum (Natural History) — in London, England, and served as head of department for botany. The position was in place between 1827 and 2013.

== Keepers of Botany ==
The following is a list of those who have held this position. Dates are those in office.

- Robert Brown 1827–1858
- John Joseph Bennett 1859–1870
- William Carruthers 1871–1895
- George Robert Milne Murray 1895–1905
- Alfred Barton Rendle 1906–1930
- John Ramsbottom 1930–1950
- George Taylor 1950–1956
- James Edgar Dandy 1956–1966
- Robert Ross 1966–1977
- John Francis Michael Cannon 1977–1990
- Stephen Blackmore 1990–1999
- Richard Bateman 2000–2004
- Johannes C. Vogel 2004–2012
- Philip Stephen Rainbow (Acting) 2012–2013
