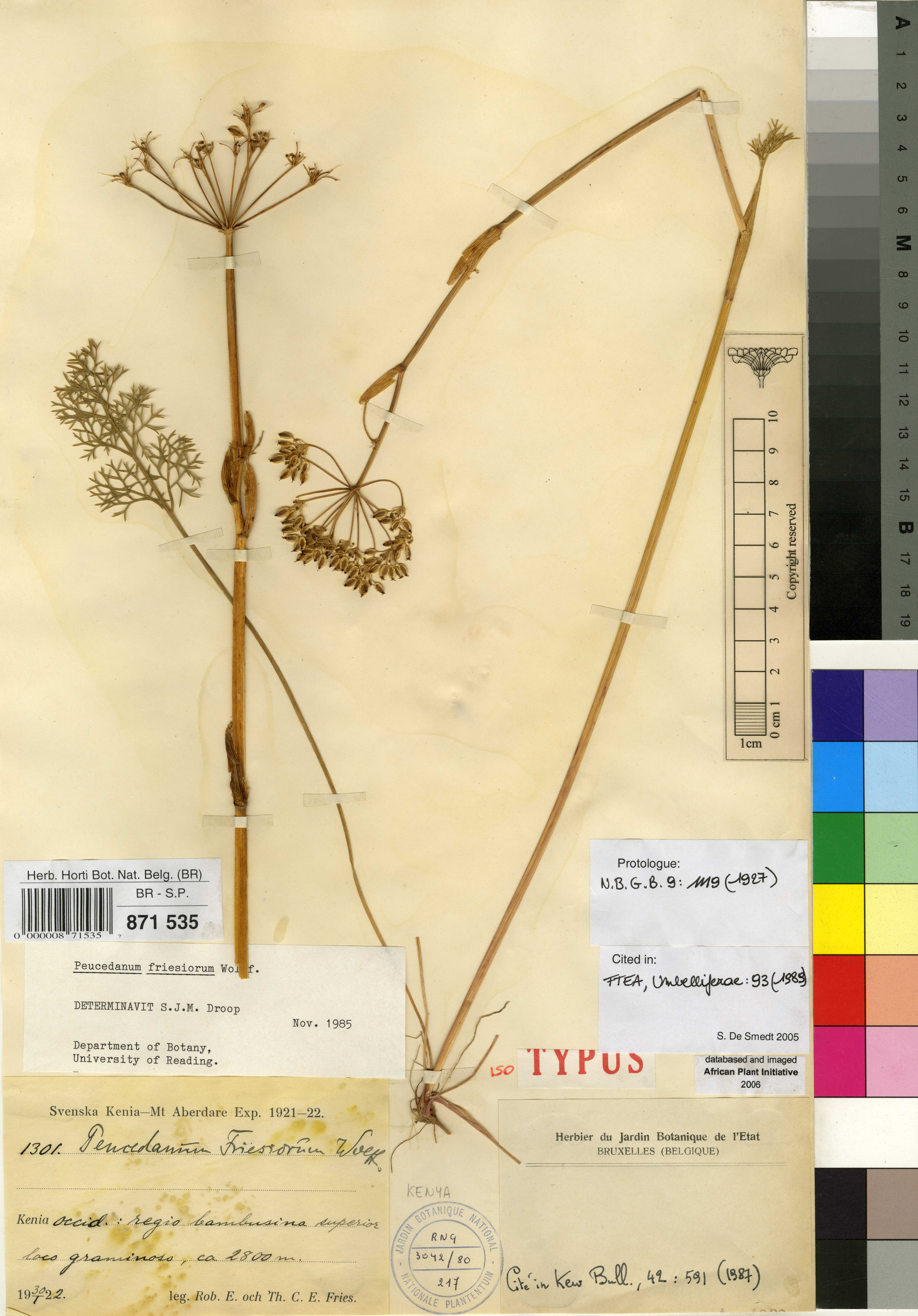

Scientific classification
- Kingdom: Plantae
- Clade: Tracheophytes
- Clade: Angiosperms
- Clade: Eudicots
- Clade: Asterids
- Order: Apiales
- Family: Apiaceae
- Genus: Afrosciadium
- Species: A. friesiorum

Binomial name
- Afrosciadium friesiorum (H.Wolff) P.J.D.Winter

Varieties
- Afrosciadium friesiorum var. bipinnatum (C.C.Towns.) P.J.D.Winter; Afrosciadium friesiorum var. friesiorum

Synonyms
- Peucedanum friesiorum H.Wolff; var. bipinnatum: Peucedanum aberdarense H.Wolff; Peucedanum friesiorum var. bipinnatum C.C.Towns.

= Afrosciadium friesiorum =

Species of flowering plant

Afrosciadium friesiorum is a species of plant in the family Apiaceae. It is a perennial tuberous herb, endemic to Mount Kenya.

== Taxonomy and history ==
Afrosciadium friesiorum was previously classified as Peucedanum friesiorum before the genus Afrosciadium was established in 2008. The variety A. f. var. bipinnatum was considered a separate species, P. aberdarense, until 1987.

Afrosciadium friesiorum has two accepted infraspecific varieties:

- Afrosciadium friesiorum var. bipinnatum
- Afrosciadium friesiorum var. friesiorum

== Distribution and habitat ==
Afrosciadium friesiorum is found only on the slopes of Mount Kenya.

== Description ==
Afrosciadium friesiorum grows to between 16 and 60 centimeters tall, with a stem 2 to 5 millimeters in diameter at its base. It boasts flowers with small, oblong, white petals, roughly 3 millimeters across. The root may form a tuber up to 8 centimeters long and 0.7 centimeters across.
