= Lefebvrea =

Scientific classification
- Kingdom: Plantae
- Clade: Tracheophytes
- Clade: Angiosperms
- Clade: Eudicots
- Clade: Asterids
- Order: Apiales
- Family: Apiaceae
- Subfamily: Apioideae
- Tribe: Tordylieae
- Genus: Lefebvrea; A.Rich.

Synonyms
- Erythroselinum Chiov.; Lefeburia Lindl., orth. var.

Genus of plants

Lefebvrea is a genus of flowering plants belonging to the family Apiaceae.

Its native range is tropical and southern Africa. It is found in Angola, Benin, Burundi, Cameroon, Central African Republic, Chad, Congo, DRC, Eswatini, Ethiopia, Kenya, Malawi, Mozambique, Namibia, Nigeria, Rwanda, South Africa (Cape Provinces, KwaZulu-Natal and the Northern Provinces), Sudan, Tanzania, Uganda, Zambia, and Zimbabwe.

The genus name of Lefebvrea is in honour of Charlemagne Théophile Lefebvre (1811–1860), a French naval officer and explorer, that took part in a scientific expedition in Ethiopia. It was first described and published in Ann. Sci. Nat., Bot., sér.2, Vol.14 on page 260 in 1840.

== Species ==
As of January 2024, Plants of the World Online accepted the following species:

- Lefebvrea abyssinica A.Rich.
- Lefebvrea angustisecta Engl.
- Lefebvrea atropurpurea (Steud. ex A.Rich.) P.J.D.Winter
- Lefebvrea brachystyla Hiern ex Oliv.
- Lefebvrea droopii C.C.Towns.
- Lefebvrea grantii (Kingston ex Oliv.) S.Droop
- Lefebvrea longipedicellata Engl.
- Lefebvrea oblongisecta (C.C.Towns.) P.J.D.Winter
- Lefebvrea stenosperma (C.C.Towns.) P.J.D.Winter
- Lefebvrea tenuis (C.C.Towns.) P.J.D.Winter
