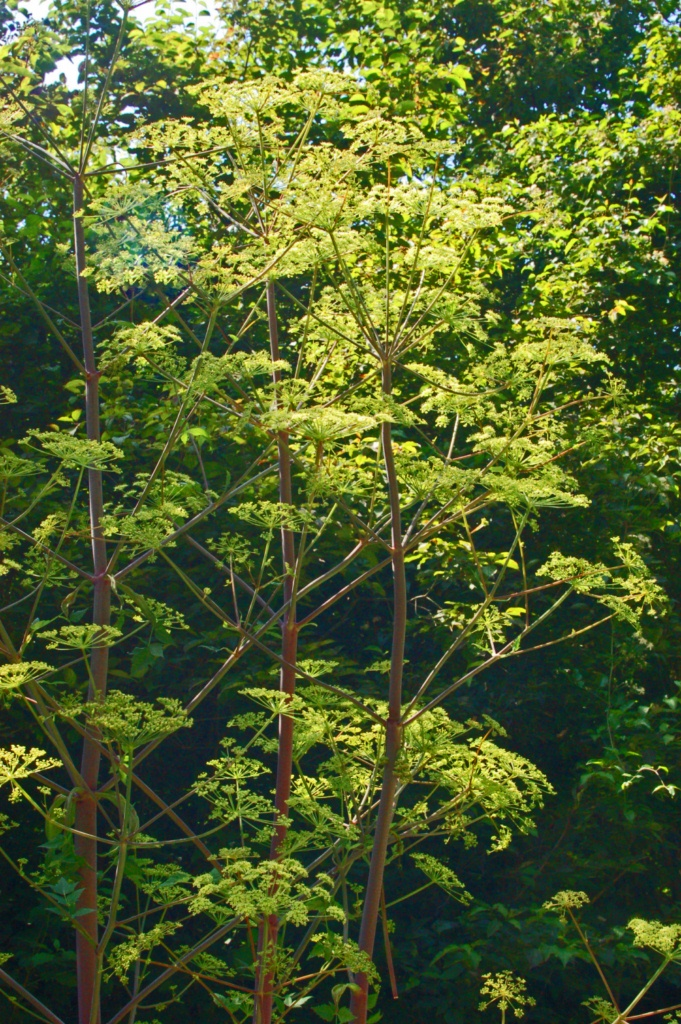
- Plants of Peucedanum verticillare

Scientific classification
- Kingdom: Plantae
- Clade: Tracheophytes
- Clade: Angiosperms
- Clade: Eudicots
- Clade: Asterids
- Order: Apiales
- Family: Apiaceae
- Genus: Peucedanum
- Species: P. verticillare

Binomial name
- Peucedanum verticillare (L.) Koch ex DC.

Synonyms
- Angelica verticillaris L.; Peucedanum altissimum (Mill.) Thell., non Desf.; Tommasinia altissima (Mill.) Thell.; Tommasinia verticillare Bertol.

= Peucedanum verticillare =

Species of flowering plant

Peucedanum verticillare, common name giant hog fennel or milk parsley, is a herbaceous plant in the genus Peucedanum of the family Apiaceae.

== Description ==
Peucedanum verticillare reaches on average 180–200 centimetres (71–79 in) in height, with a maximum of 300 centimetres (120 in).

The stems are glaucous purple, erect, stout (1–2 cm in diameter) and finely striated, with 2-3 large flattened umbels with 12-20 rays bearing small greenish white flowers. These huge and showy umbellifers have a basal bushy rosette of finely cut glossy dark-green leaves, beetroot-red when they are young. The flowering period extends from June through August in their native habitat.

Giant Hog Fennel is a biennial or short-lived perennial that needs two-five years to reach maturity. These plants are deciduous and die after flowering and producing seeds. As the seeds germinate quite easily, usually many seedlings grow all around the previous plant. This plant is toxic if ingested.

== Distribution ==
This species is widespread in south-eastern Europe up to Asia.

== Habitat ==
Peucedanum verticillare is commonly present in riverbeds, the banks of streams, stony grounds and ravines. It prefers rich and well drained soil in a sunny or partially shady place, at an altitude of 0–1,600 metres (0–5,249 ft) above sea level.

== Gallery ==
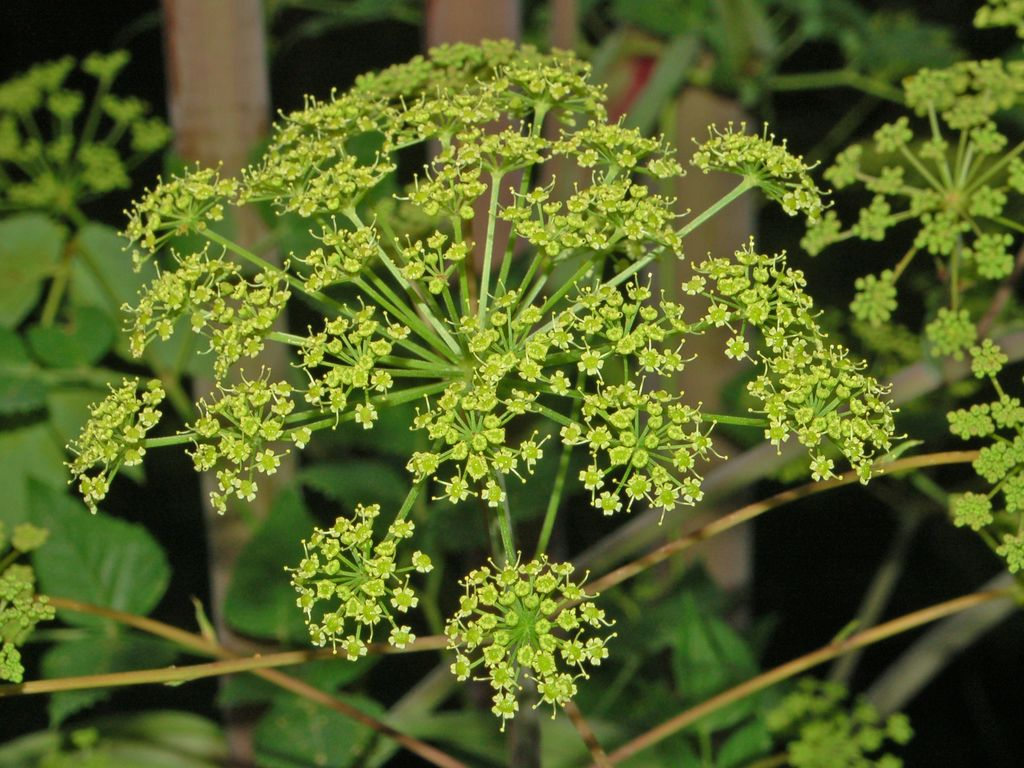
Close-up of inflorescence of Peucedanum verticillare

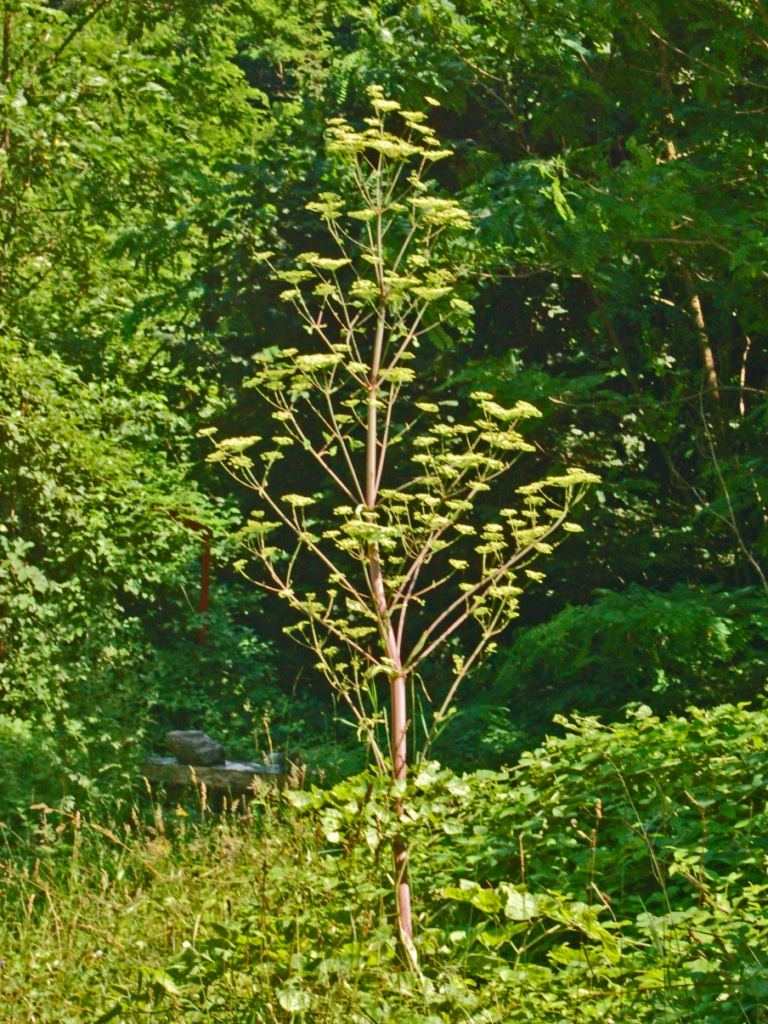
Plant of Peucedanum verticillare

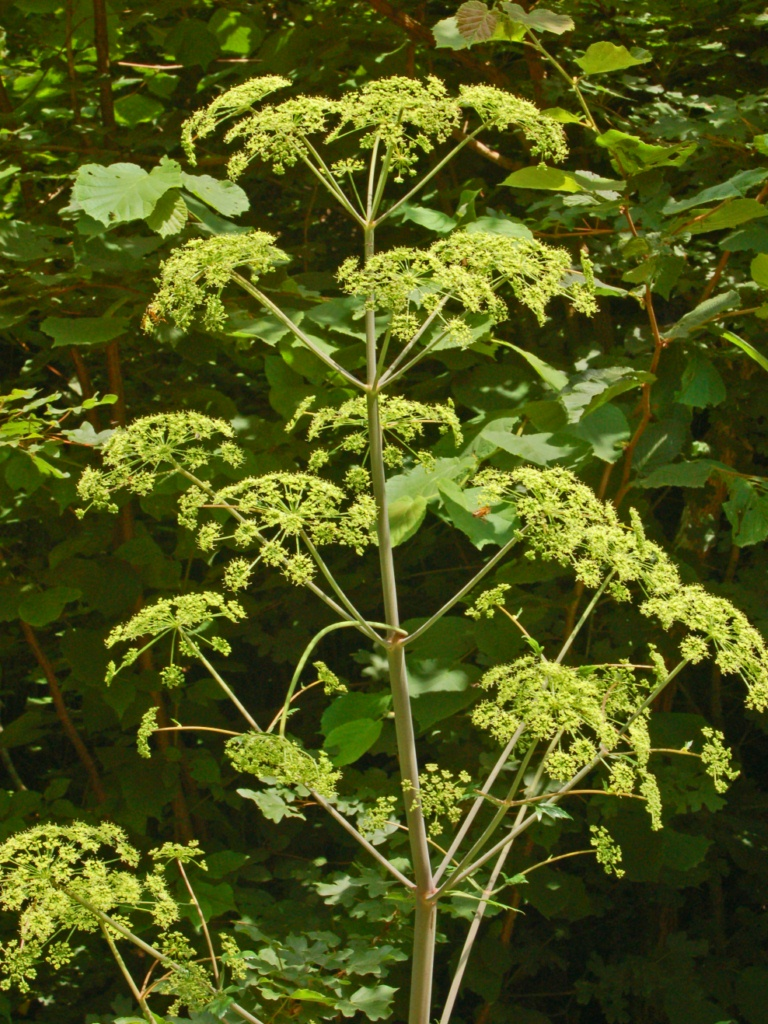
Plant of Peucedanum verticillare

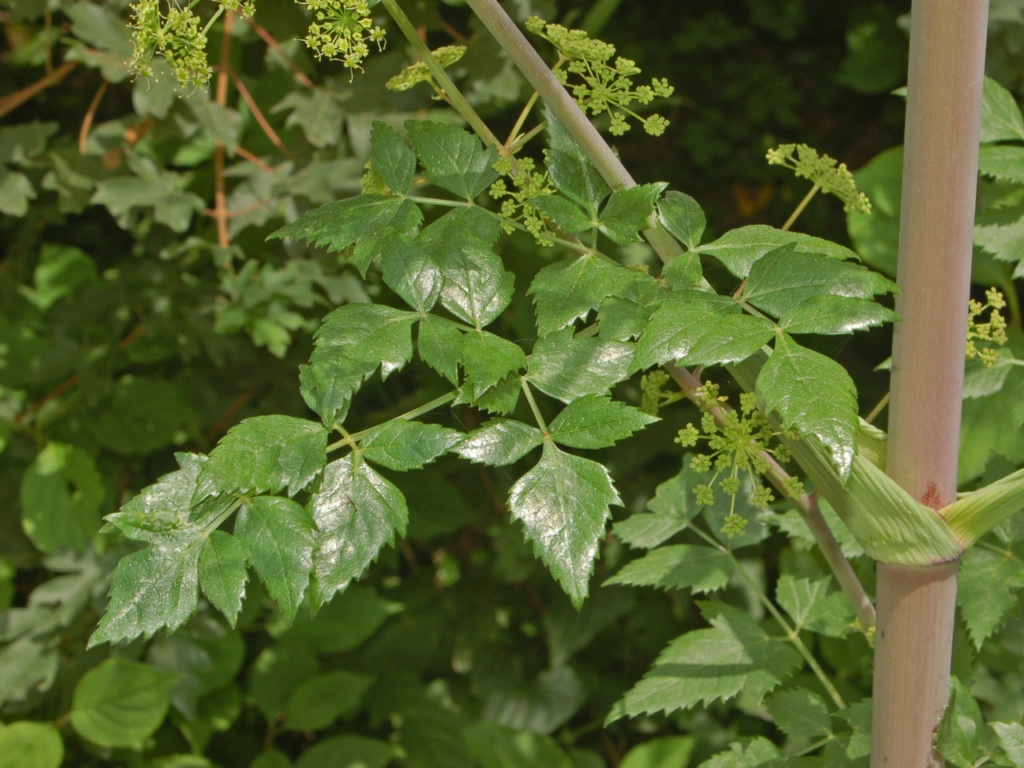
Leaves of Peucedanum verticillare
