= Peucedanum cordatum =

Conservation status
- Least Concern (IUCN 3.1)

Scientific classification
- Kingdom: Plantae
- Clade: Tracheophytes
- Clade: Angiosperms
- Clade: Eudicots
- Clade: Asterids
- Order: Apiales
- Family: Apiaceae
- Genus: Peucedanum
- Species: P. cordatum

Binomial name
- Peucedanum cordatum Balf.f. (1882)

Synonyms
- Rughidia cordata (Balf.f.) M.F.Watson & E.L.Barclay, ined.

Species of flowering plant

Peucedanum cordatum is a species of flowering plant in the family Apiaceae. It is a perennial endemic to the island of Socotra in Yemen. It is locally common in the shade of moist woodland from 500 to 1,200 metres elevation.

It is also known by the synonyms Rughidia cordata and Rughidia cordatum, but Plants of the World Online accepts neither species name nor the genus Rughidia.
