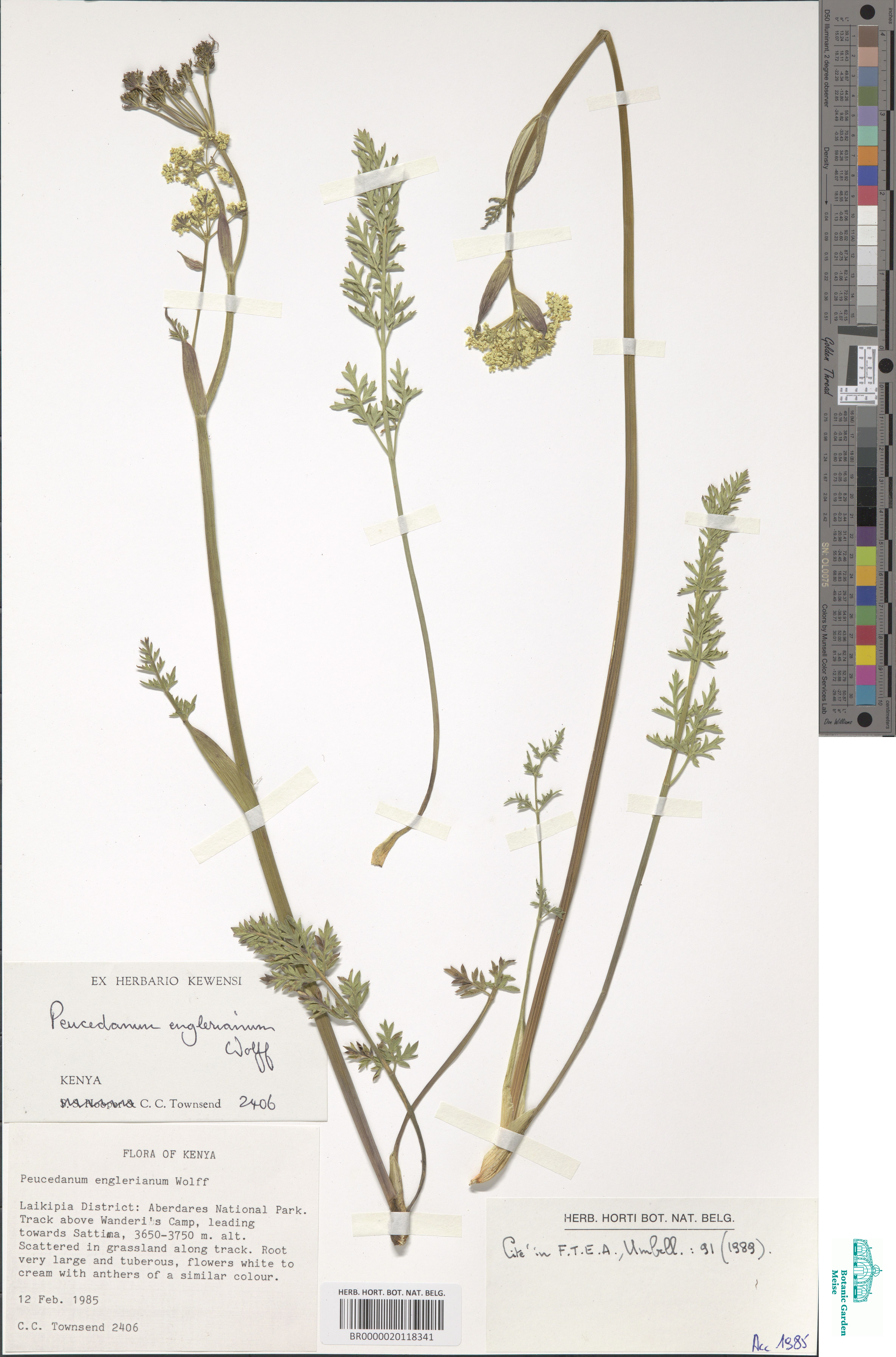

Scientific classification
- Kingdom: Plantae
- Clade: Tracheophytes
- Clade: Angiosperms
- Clade: Eudicots
- Clade: Asterids
- Order: Apiales
- Family: Apiaceae
- Genus: Afrosciadium
- Species: A. englerianum

Binomial name
- Afrosciadium englerianum (H.Wolff) P.J.D.Winter (2008)

Synonyms
- Peucedanum englerianum H.Wolff (1927)

= Afrosciadium englerianum =

Species of flowering plant

Afrosciadium englerianum is a member of the carrot family, Apiaceae. It is a perennial tuberous herb, endemic to the Aberdare Mountains in Kenya.

Afrosciadium englerianum was previously classified as Peucedanum englerianum before the genus Afrosciadium was established in 2008.

Afrosciadium englerianum is found between roughly 3,400 to 3,750 meters above sea level, in rough grasslands or swamps in the mountains of Kenya. It grows to be 35 to 80 centimeters tall, with a stem roughly 5 millimeters in diameter at its base. It boasts flowers with small, oblong petals, roughly 1.5 millimeters across, of a green-tinged white or cream color. The large, tuberous root grows up to 30 centimeters long.
