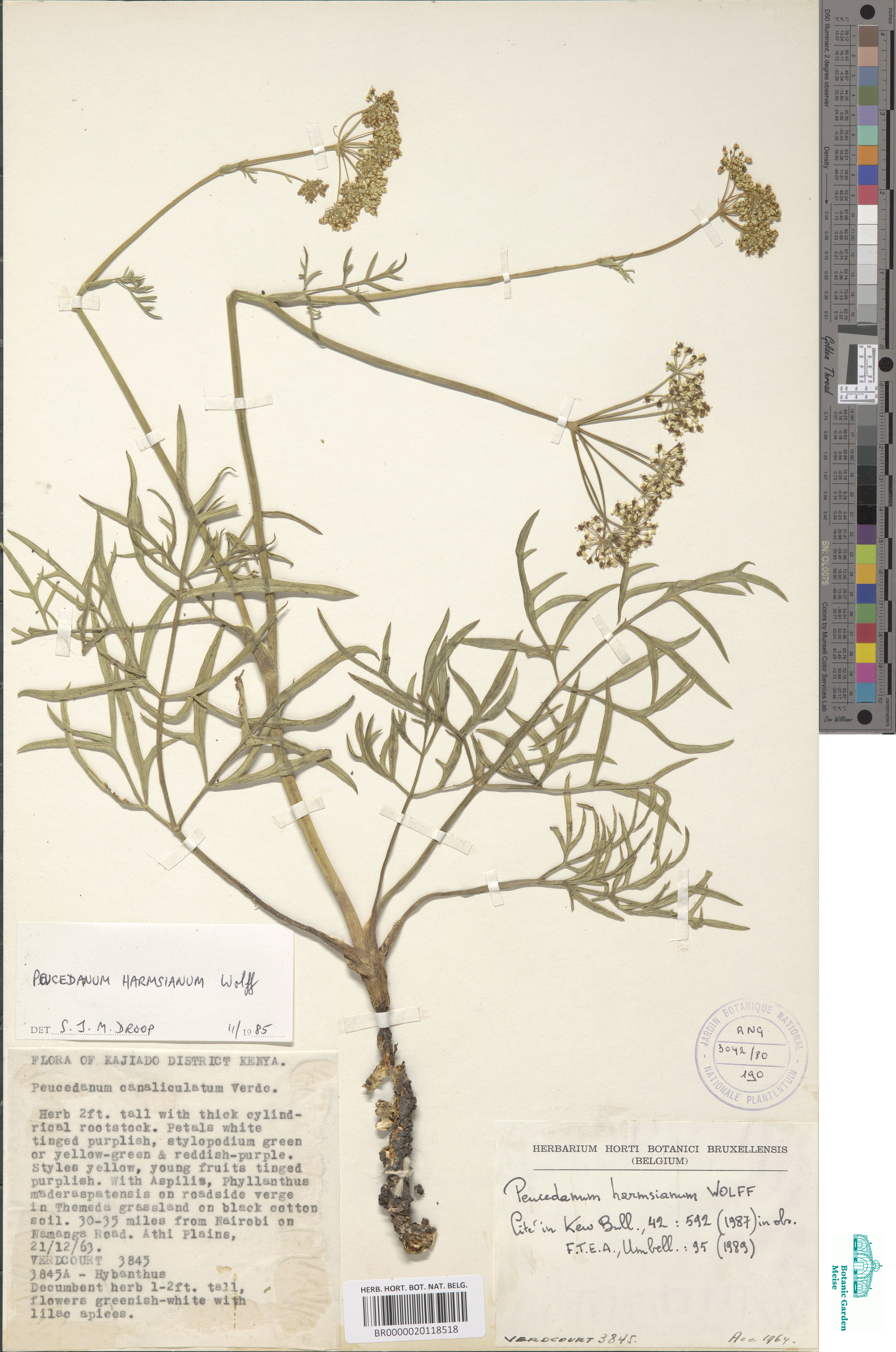

Scientific classification
- Kingdom: Plantae
- Clade: Tracheophytes
- Clade: Angiosperms
- Clade: Eudicots
- Clade: Asterids
- Order: Apiales
- Family: Apiaceae
- Genus: Afrosciadium
- Species: A. harmsianum

Binomial name
- Afrosciadium harmsianum (H.Wolff) P.J.D.Winter (2008)

Synonyms
- Peucedanum harmsianum H.Wolff (1927); Peucedanum canaliculatum Verdc. (1954)

= Afrosciadium harmsianum =

Species of flowering plant

Afrosciadium harmsianum is a member of the carrot family, Apiaceae. It is a perennial tuberous herb native to east tropical Africa (southern Ethiopia, Tanzania and Kenya), while the subspecies A. h. australe is endemic to northern Tanzania.

A. harmsianum was previously classified under the genus Peucedanum, but was reclassified as the type species for the new genus Afrosciadium in 2008.

Afrosciadium harmsianum has two accepted subspecies:

- Afrosciadium harmsianum australe
- Afrosciadium harmsianum harmsianum

Afrosciadium harmsianum grows to be between 11 and 90 centimeters tall, with a stem 5 millimeters in diameter at the base.
