= Afrosciadium platycarpum =

Scientific classification
- Kingdom: Plantae
- Clade: Tracheophytes
- Clade: Angiosperms
- Clade: Eudicots
- Clade: Asterids
- Order: Apiales
- Family: Apiaceae
- Genus: Afrosciadium
- Species: A. platycarpum

Binomial name
- Afrosciadium platycarpum (Sond.) P.J.D.Winter (2008)

Synonyms
- Peucedanum platycarpum Sond. (1862)

Species of flowering plant

Afrosciadium platycarpum is a member of the carrot family, Apiaceae. It is a perennial tuberous herb, endemic to southeastern South Africa.

Afrosciadium platycarpum was previously classified as Peucedanum platycarpum before the genus Afrosciadium was established in 2008.
