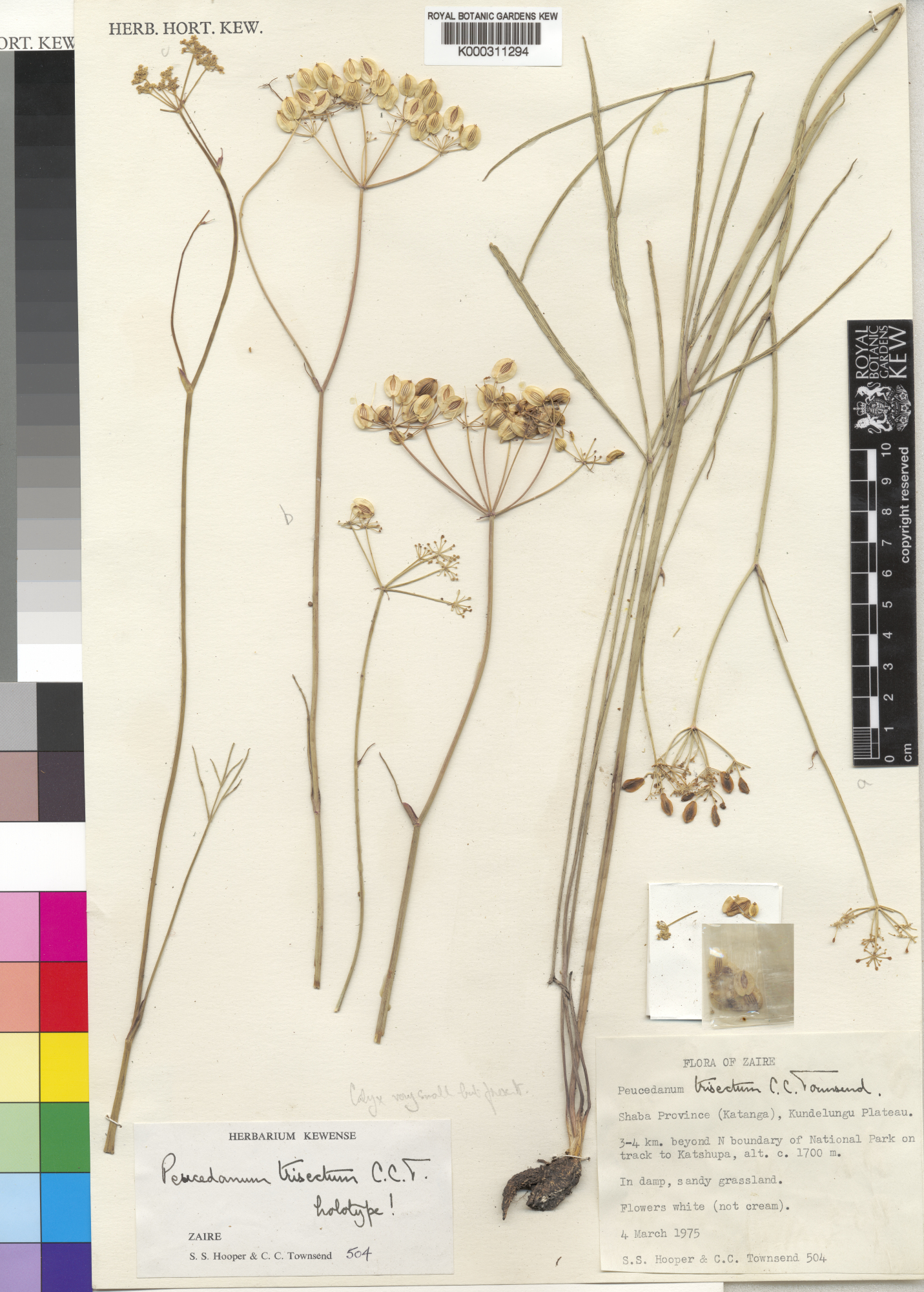

Scientific classification
- Kingdom: Plantae
- Clade: Tracheophytes
- Clade: Angiosperms
- Clade: Eudicots
- Clade: Asterids
- Order: Apiales
- Family: Apiaceae
- Genus: Afrosciadium
- Species: A. trisectum

Binomial name
- Afrosciadium trisectum (C.C.Towns.) P.J.D.Winter (2008)

Synonyms
- Peucedanum trisectum C.C.Towns. (1978)

= Afrosciadium trisectum =

Species of flowering plant

Afrosciadium trisectum is a member of the carrot family, Apiaceae. It is a perennial tuberous herb with white flowers, endemic to the southeastern Democratic Republic of the Congo.

Afrosciadium trisectum was previously classified as Peucedanum trisectum before the genus Afrosciadium was established in 2008.
