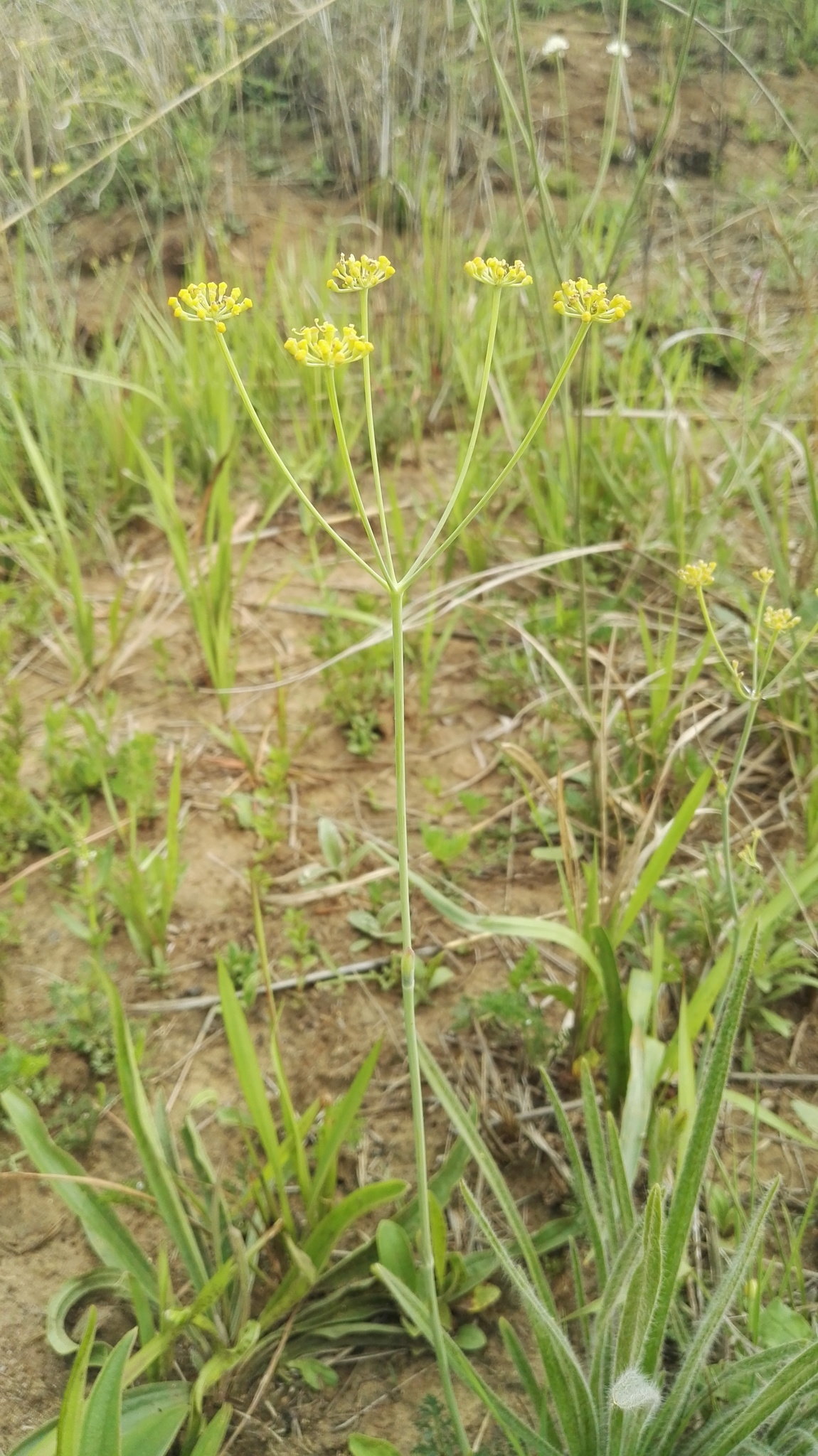

Scientific classification
- Kingdom: Plantae
- Clade: Tracheophytes
- Clade: Angiosperms
- Clade: Eudicots
- Clade: Asterids
- Order: Apiales
- Family: Apiaceae
- Genus: Afrosciadium
- Species: A. magalismontanum

Binomial name
- Afrosciadium magalismontanum (Sond.) P.J.D.Winter (2008)

Synonyms
- Peucedanum magalismontanum Sond. (1862); Peucedanum schlechteri Engl. (1921); Peucedanum schlechterianum H.Wolff (1912)

= Afrosciadium magalismontanum =

Species of flowering plant

Afrosciadium magalismontanum is a member of the carrot family, Apiaceae. It is a perennial tuberous herb native to subtropical regions in eastern South Africa (Free State, KwaZulu-Natal, and Northern Provinces) and Eswatini. It has a tall, narrow stem which divides into multiple evenly-spaced branches near the top, with each branch sporting a cluster of small yellow flowers at its end.

Afrosciadium magalismontanum was previously known under the synonym Peucedanum magalismontanum before the genus Afrosciadium was established in 2008.
