= Afrosciadium natalense =

Scientific classification
- Kingdom: Plantae
- Clade: Tracheophytes
- Clade: Angiosperms
- Clade: Eudicots
- Clade: Asterids
- Order: Apiales
- Family: Apiaceae
- Genus: Afrosciadium
- Species: A. natalense

Binomial name
- Afrosciadium natalense (Sond.) P.J.D.Winter (2008)

Synonyms
- Seseli natalense Sond. (1862); Peucedanum natalense (Sond.) Engl. (1921)

Species of flowering plant

Afrosciadium natalense is a member of the carrot family, Apiaceae. It is a perennial tuberous herb, endemic to the KwaZulu-Natal province of South Africa.

Afrosciadium natalense was previously classified as Peucedanum natalense before the genus Afrosciadium was established in 2008.
