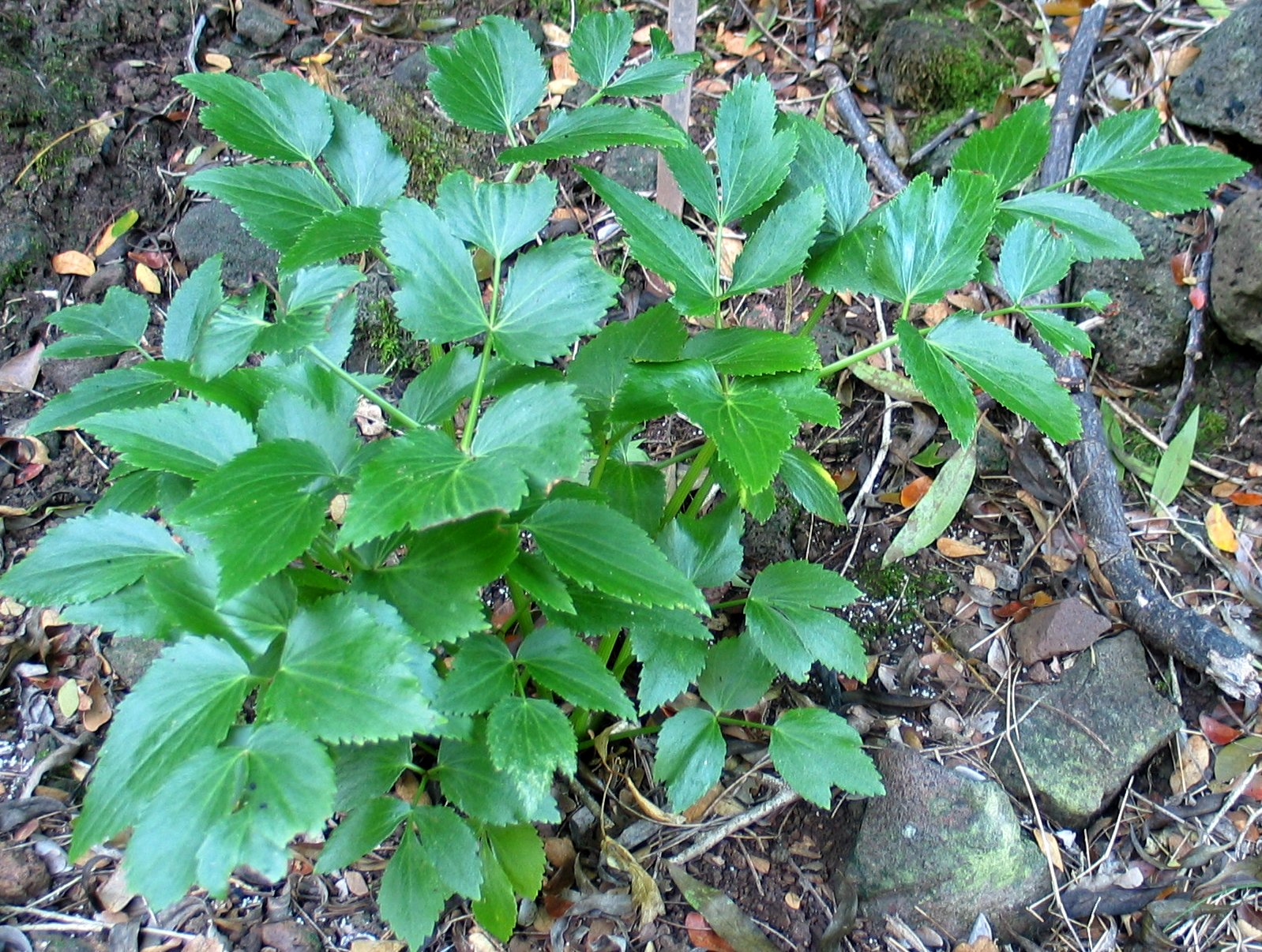

Conservation status
- Imperiled (NatureServe)

Scientific classification
- Kingdom: Plantae
- Clade: Tracheophytes
- Clade: Angiosperms
- Clade: Eudicots
- Clade: Asterids
- Order: Apiales
- Family: Apiaceae
- Genus: Peucedanum
- Species: P. sandwicense

Binomial name
- Peucedanum sandwicense Hillebr.

= Peucedanum sandwicense =

Species of flowering plant

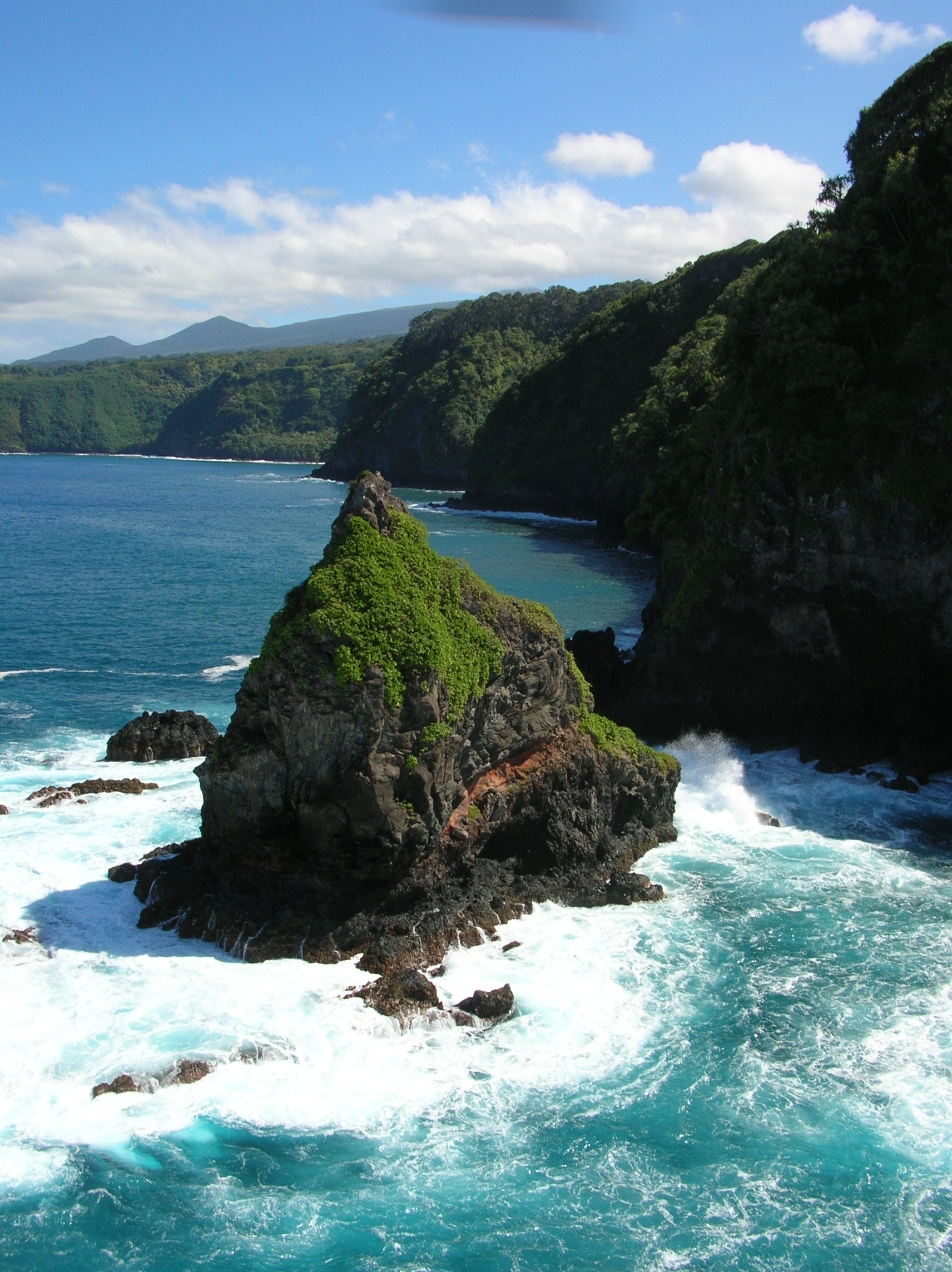
Habitat of P. sandwicense

Peucedanum sandwicense is a rare species of flowering plant in the carrot family known by the common name makou. It is endemic to Hawaii, where it is known from Maui, Molokai, Kauai, and Oahu. It is threatened by introduced species of plants and animals. It is a federally listed threatened species of the United States.

This is a perennial herb which grows up to a meter tall, or possibly more. The caudex has a ring of fleshy roots. The leaves have highly dissected blades borne on long, stout petioles. The inflorescence is an umbel of many tiny white flowers. The plant has a scent similar to parsley.

This plant, the only Peucedanum found in the Hawaiian Islands, grows in coastal canyons and on cliffs overlooking the ocean. There are two small populations in the Waianae Range of Oahu, three on Molokai, ten on Kauai, and one on Keopuka Rock, an islet close to the coast of Maui.

There are fewer than 10,000 individuals, and perhaps fewer than 5,000.

Threats to the species include non-native plants such as lantana (Lantana camara), as well as feral goats, hiking and the maintenance of hiking trails, fires, landslides and rockslides.
