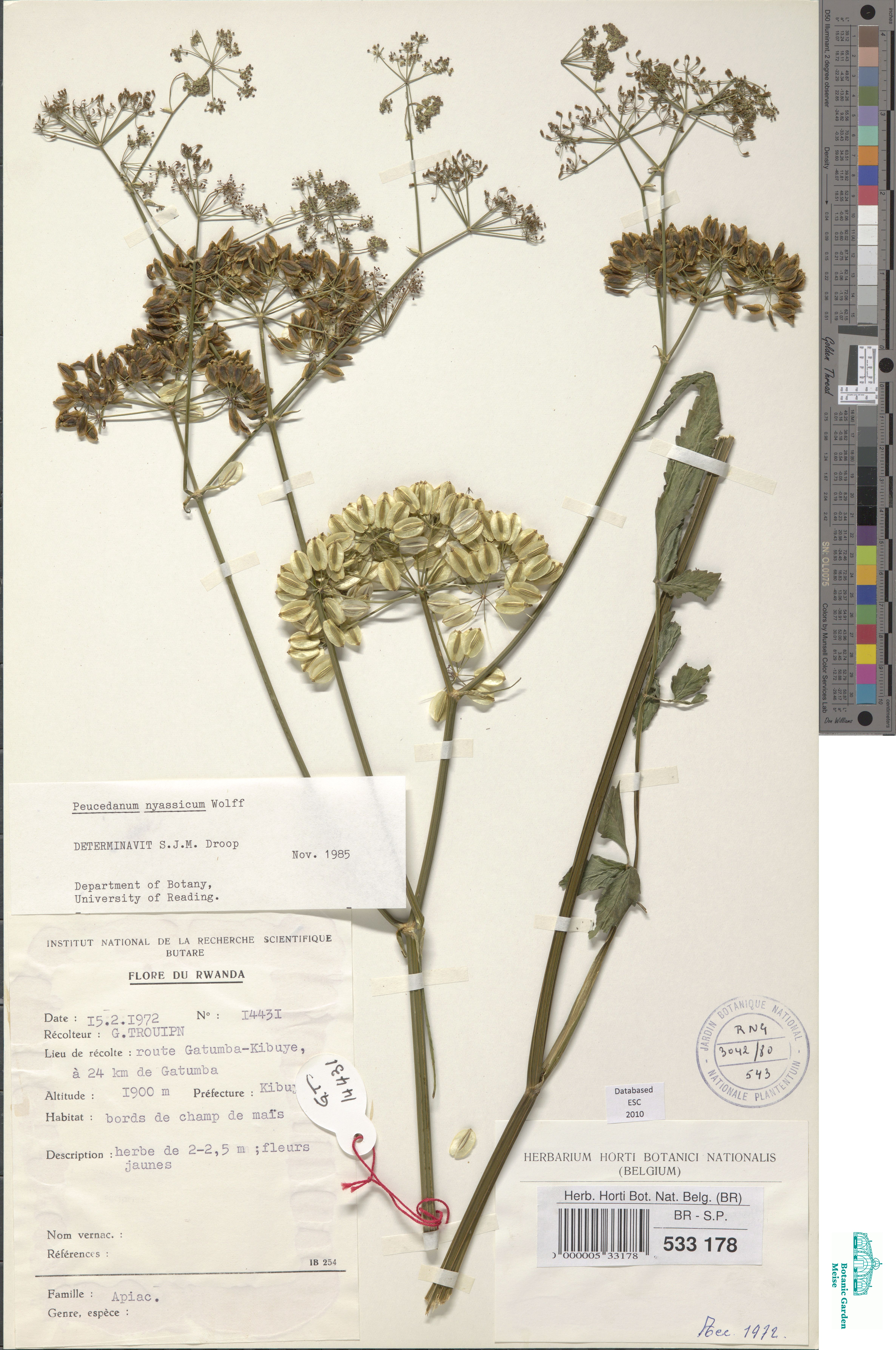

Scientific classification
- Kingdom: Plantae
- Clade: Tracheophytes
- Clade: Angiosperms
- Clade: Eudicots
- Clade: Asterids
- Order: Apiales
- Family: Apiaceae
- Genus: Afrosciadium
- Species: A. nyassicum

Binomial name
- Afrosciadium nyassicum (H.Wolff) P.J.D.Winter (2008)

Synonyms
- Peucedanum nyassicum H.Wolff (1912); Peucedanum doctoris C.Norman (1928); Peucedanum monticola C.Norman (1928)

= Afrosciadium nyassicum =

Species of flowering plant

Afrosciadium nyassicum is a member of the carrot family, Apiaceae. It is a perennial tuberous herb native to central Africa (the Democratic Republic of the Congo, Rwanda, Uganda, Malawi, and Zambia).

Afrosciadium nyassicum was previously classified as Peucedanum nyassicum before the genus Afrosciadium was established in 2008.

Afrosciadium nyassicum grows to be up to 2 meters tall, and possesses small, yellow-green flowers.
