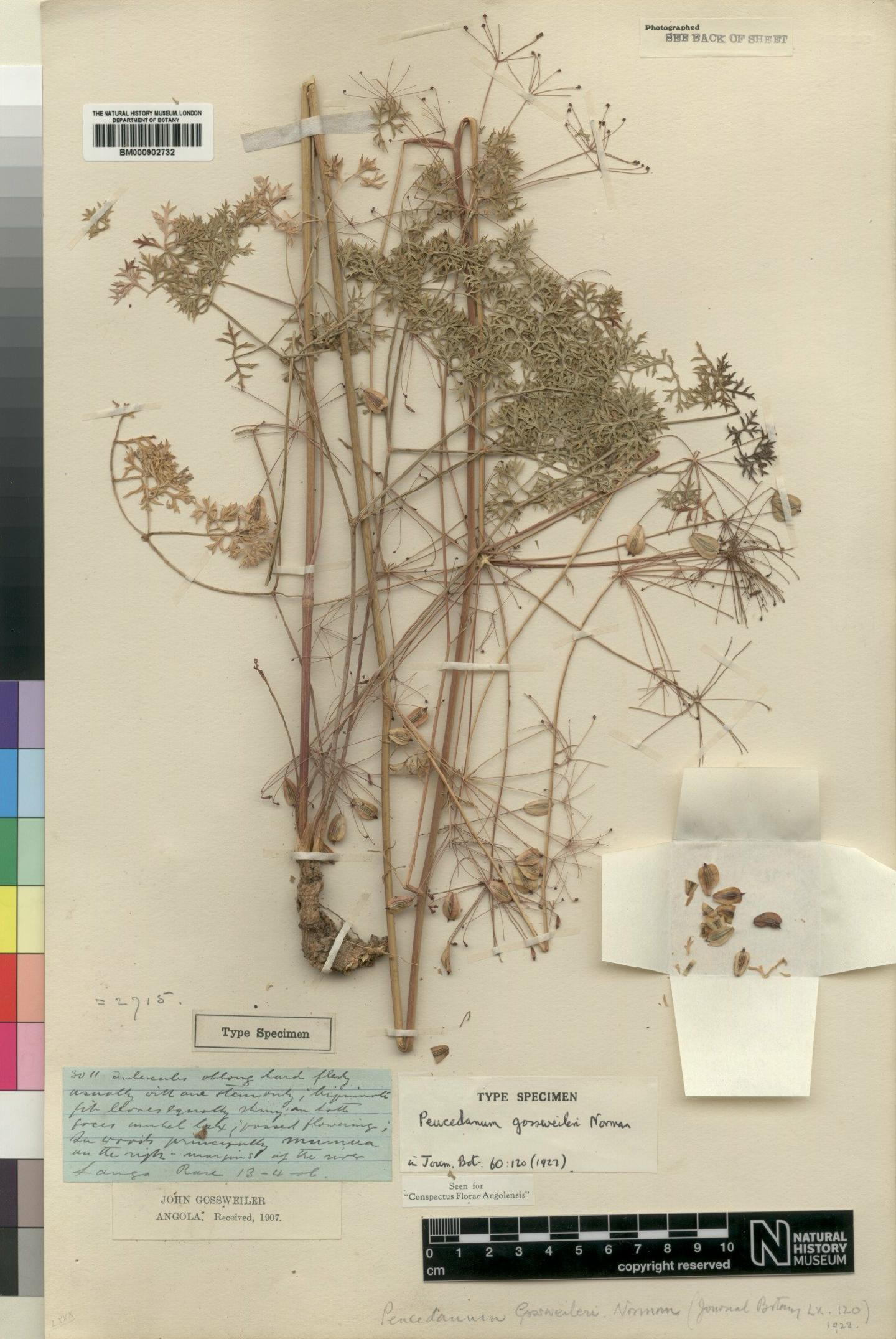

Scientific classification
- Kingdom: Plantae
- Clade: Tracheophytes
- Clade: Angiosperms
- Clade: Eudicots
- Clade: Asterids
- Order: Apiales
- Family: Apiaceae
- Genus: Afrosciadium
- Species: A. gossweileri

Binomial name
- Afrosciadium gossweileri (C.Norman) P.J.D.Winter (2008)

Synonyms
- Peucedanum gossweileri C.Norman (1922)

= Afrosciadium gossweileri =

Species of flowering plant

Afrosciadium gossweileri is a member of the carrot family, Apiaceae. It is a perennial tuberous herb, endemic to subtropical Angola.

Afrosciadium gossweileri was previously classified as Peucedanum gossweileri before the genus Afrosciadium was established in 2008.
