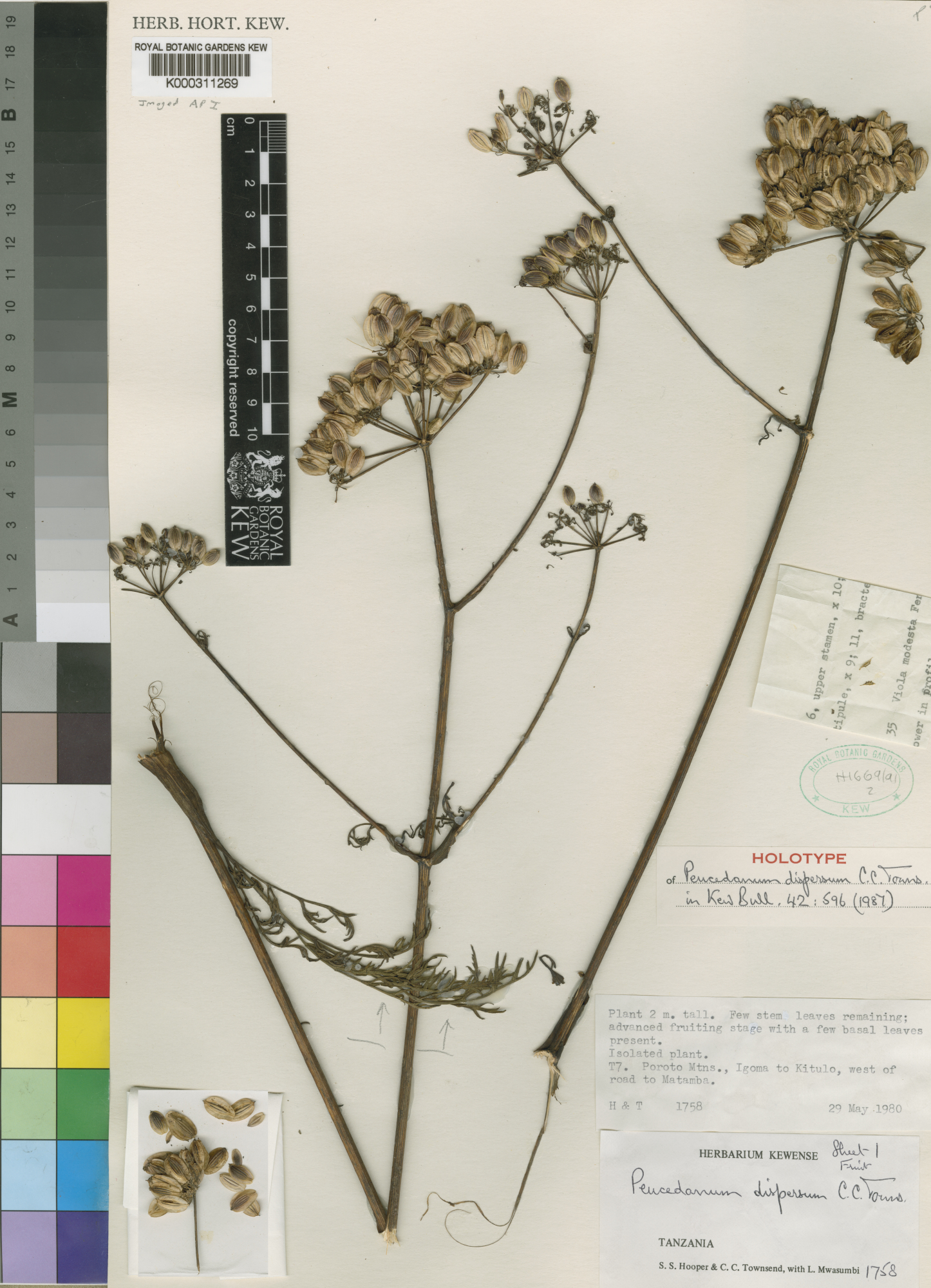

Scientific classification
- Kingdom: Plantae
- Clade: Tracheophytes
- Clade: Angiosperms
- Clade: Eudicots
- Clade: Asterids
- Order: Apiales
- Family: Apiaceae
- Genus: Afrosciadium
- Species: A. dispersum

Binomial name
- Afrosciadium dispersum (C.C.Towns.) P.J.D.Winter (2008)

Synonyms
- Peucedanum dispersum C.C.Towns. (1987)

= Afrosciadium dispersum =

Species of flowering plant

Afrosciadium dispersum is a member of the carrot family, Apiaceae. It is a perennial tuberous herb native to tropical mountains in South Sudan, northern Uganda, and southwestern Tanzania.

Afrosciadium dispersum was previously classified as Peucedanum dispersum before the genus Afrosciadium was established in 2008.

Afrosciadium dispersum is found between roughly 2000 to 2,500 meters above sea level, in rough grasslands or swamps. It grows to be over 2 meters tall, with a stem at least 8 millimeters in diameter at its base. It boasts flowers with small, oblong petals, roughly 2 millimeters across, of a creamy yellow color.
