= Robert Ross (botanist) =

English botanist (1912–2005)

Robert Ross, Fellow of the Linnean Society (14 August 1912 in Pinner – 25 May 2005) was an English botanist. He was Keeper of Botany at the British Natural History Museum. He was the botanist on the 1952 British Museum Ruwenzori expedition.
