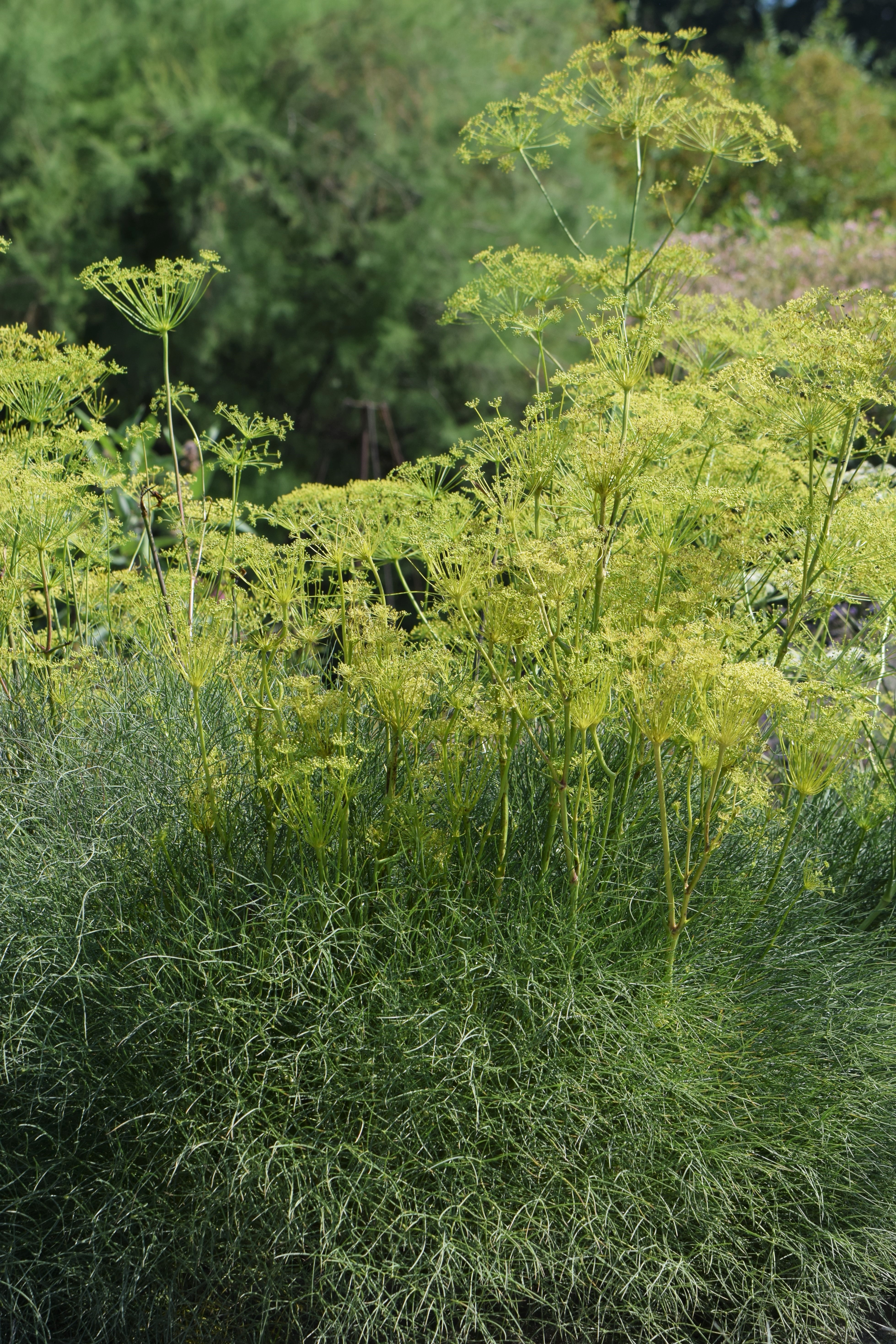

Scientific classification
- Kingdom: Plantae
- Clade: Tracheophytes
- Clade: Angiosperms
- Clade: Eudicots
- Clade: Asterids
- Order: Apiales
- Family: Apiaceae
- Genus: Peucedanum
- Species: P. officinale

Binomial name
- Peucedanum officinale L.

Synonyms
- Peucedanum stenocarpum Boiss. & Reut.; Selinum officinale (L.) Vest

= Peucedanum officinale =

Species of flowering plant

== Description ==
Peucedanum officinale is a herbaceous perennial plant in the family Apiaceae found mainly in Central Europe and Southern Europe. It is also native to the UK, where it has the common names hog's fennel and sulphurweed, but it is a rare plant there, occurring only in certain localities in the counties of Essex and Kent. It was formerly also found near the town of Shoreham-by-Sea in the county of West Sussex, but has long been extinct there.

== Habitat ==
Rough grassland, clayey banks and cliffs near the sea. It is a glabrous perennial with stems up to 2 m in height, solid, striate, sometimes weakly angled, sparsely blotched wine red, surrounded by fibrous remains of petioles at the base and springing from a stout rootstock. The umbels of greenish-yellow flowers contrast pleasingly with the bushy, radiating mass of dark green, long-petioled leaves, which bear linear, sessile lobes, attenuate at both ends and having narrow, cartilaginous margins (i.e., individual lobes resembling blades of grass).

== Taxonomy ==
Peucedanum officinale has been known as a medicinal plant in Britain since at least the 17th century and features in the herbals of Nicholas Culpeper (in whose day it was more plentiful, for he records it as growing abundantly on Faversham marshes) and John Gerard. Culpepper records the additional common names hoar strange, hoar strong, (compare German "Haarstrang", meaning hog's tail) brimstonewort and sulphurwort.

The long stout taproot - 'black without and white within' and sometimes 'as big as a man's thigh', as Gerard has it - yields, when incised in Spring, a considerable quantity of a yellowish-green latex, which dries into a gummy oleoresin and retains the strong, sulphurous scent of the root. This harvesting technique, and the product so obtained, very much recall those of two other medicinal umbellifers: Ferula assa-foetida and Dorema ammoniacum. A decoction of the root of P. officinale is diuretic, sudorific, antiscorbutic and controls menstruation. Gummi Peucedani, the oleoresin derived from the drying of the root latex, has properties similar to those of Gum Ammoniac (the oleoresin derived from Dorema ammoniacum). Peucedanum officinale has also been used in veterinary medicine.
