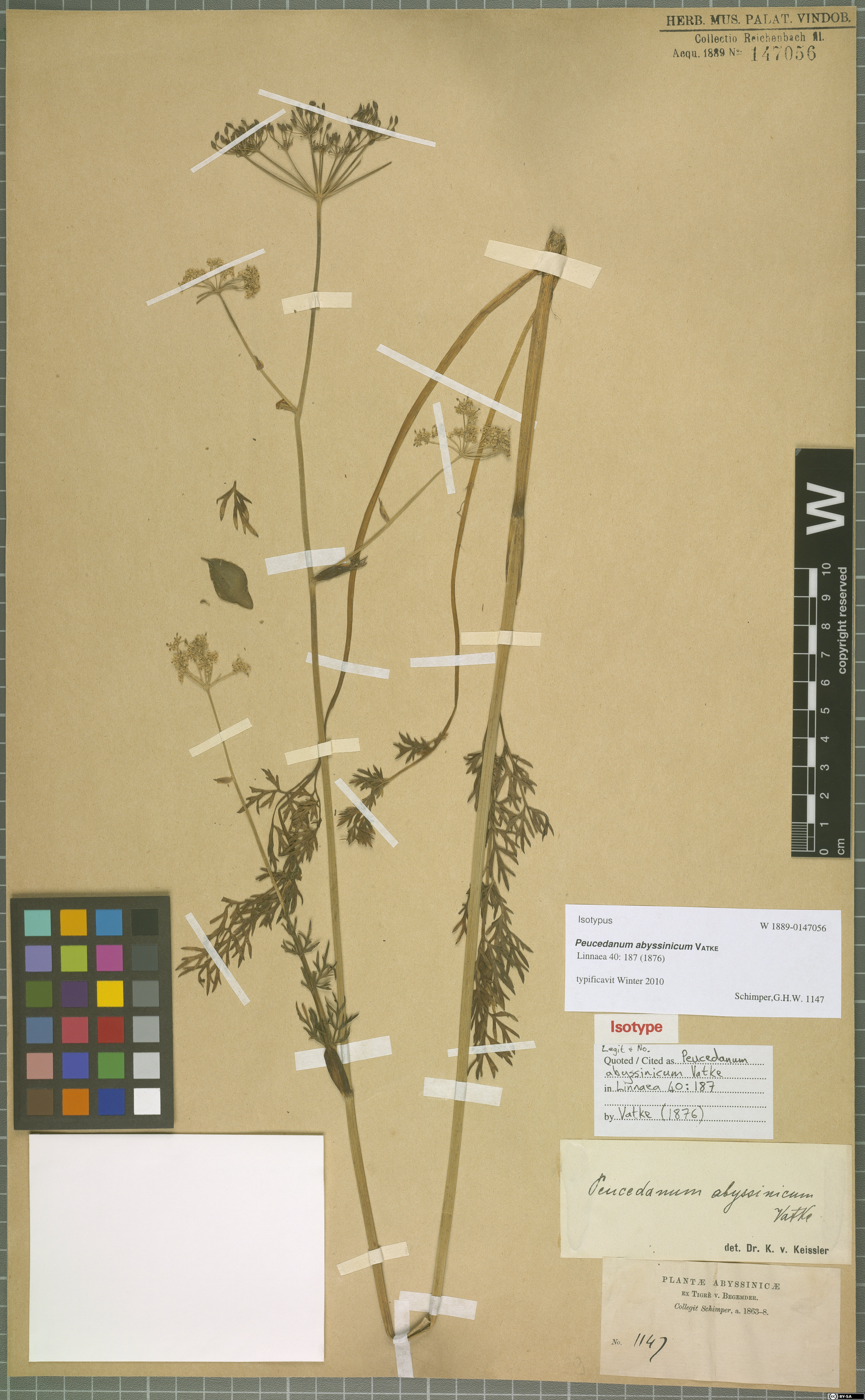

Conservation status
- Vulnerable (IUCN 3.1)

Scientific classification
- Kingdom: Plantae
- Clade: Tracheophytes
- Clade: Angiosperms
- Clade: Eudicots
- Clade: Asterids
- Order: Apiales
- Family: Apiaceae
- Genus: Afrosciadium
- Species: A. abyssinicum

Binomial name
- Afrosciadium abyssinicum (Vatke) P.J.D.Winter (2008)

Synonyms
- Peucedanum abyssinicum Vatke (1876); Peucedanum silaifolium Hiern (1877)

= Afrosciadium abyssinicum =

Species of flowering plant

Afrosciadium abyssinicum, synonym Peucedanum abyssinicum, is a member of the carrot family, Apiaceae. It is native to Ethiopia, where it grows at high elevations.
