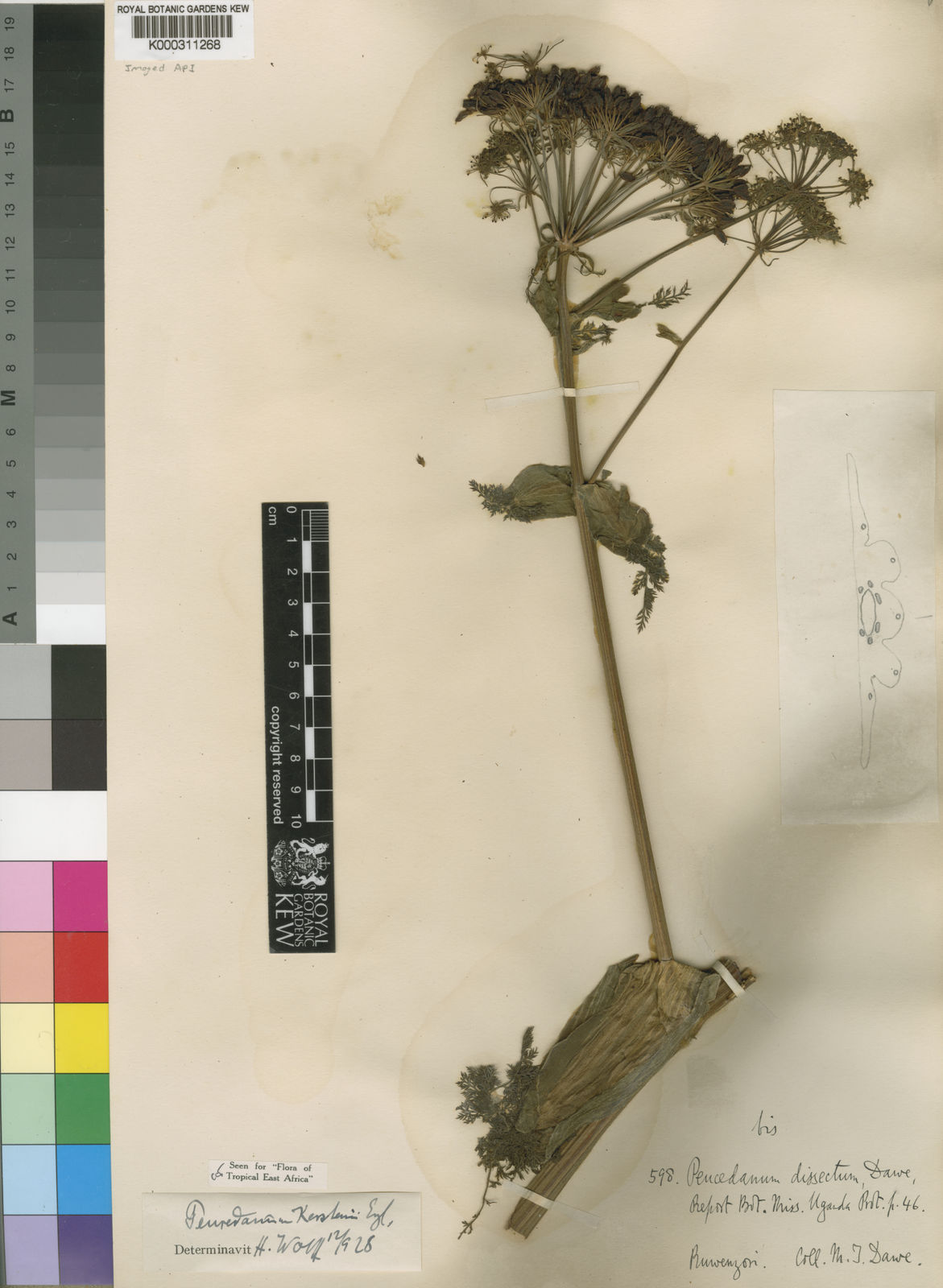

Scientific classification
- Kingdom: Plantae
- Clade: Tracheophytes
- Clade: Angiosperms
- Clade: Eudicots
- Clade: Asterids
- Order: Apiales
- Family: Apiaceae
- Genus: Afrosciadium
- Species: A. kerstenii

Binomial name
- Afrosciadium kerstenii (Engl.) P.J.D.Winter

Synonyms
- Anthriscus dissectus C.H.Wright; Peucedanum dissectum (C.H.Wright) Dawe; Peucedanum kerstenii Engl.; Peucedanum mildbraedii H.Wolff; Peucedanum wrightii M.Hiroe

= Afrosciadium kerstenii =

Species of flowering plant

Afrosciadium kerstenii, synonym Peucedanum kerstenii, is a member of the carrot family, Apiaceae. It is native to east tropical Africa (Kenya, Rwanda, Tanzania and Uganda) and the Democratic Republic of the Congo (Zaïre). It grows among the giant groundsels (Dendrosenecio) atop of the mountains of east Africa: Mount Kilimanjaro, Mount Kenya, Rwenzori Mountains and the Virunga Volcanoes.

Afrosciadium kerstenii is a shrublike "large hardy perennial" umbel that grows to be 2 meters (6 – 7 feet) tall and found on the Ruwenzori Range in woodlands at altitudes of 3,500–4,200 meters (11,500–13,800 ft), and on the slopes of all the larger mountains mixed with Hagenia abyssinica.

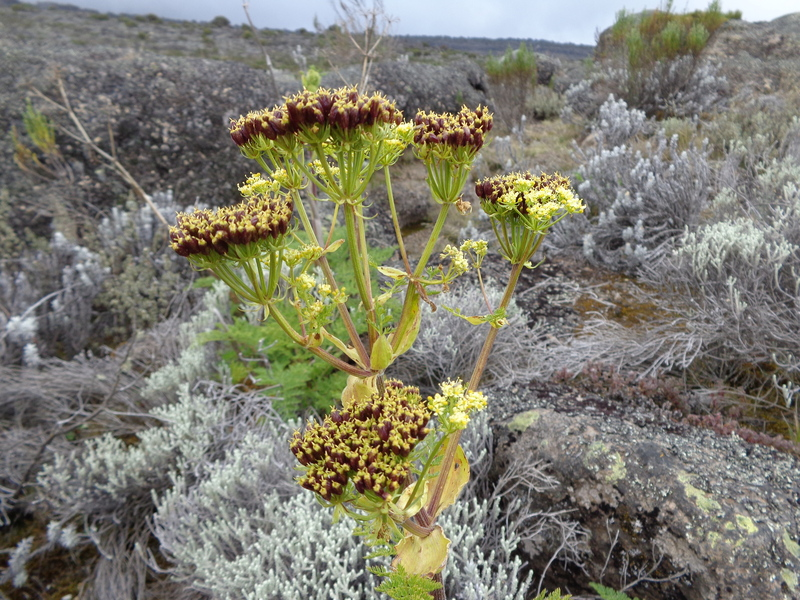
Afrosciadium kerstenii on the Shira Plateau of Mount Kilimanjaro
