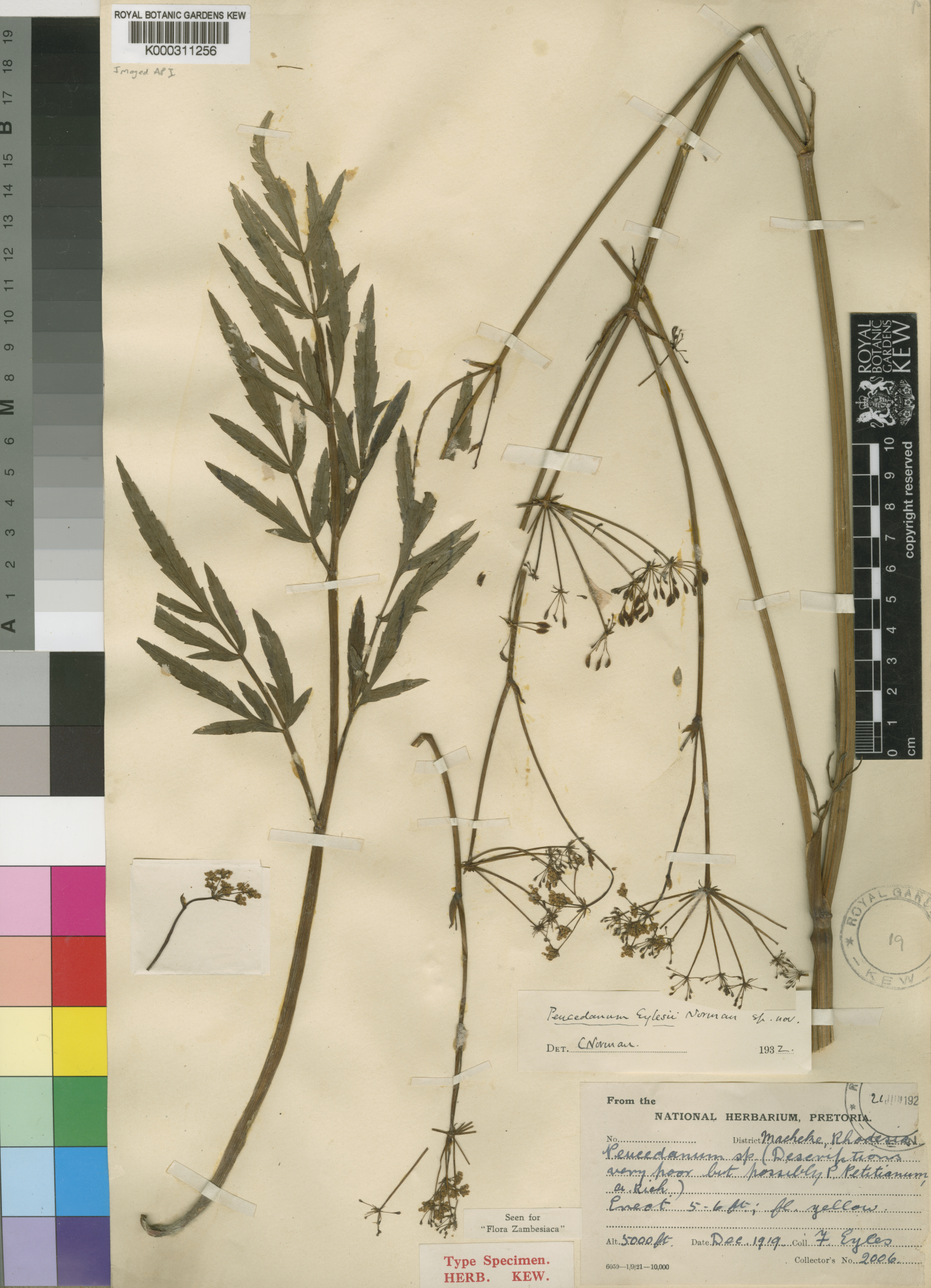

Scientific classification
- Kingdom: Plantae
- Clade: Tracheophytes
- Clade: Angiosperms
- Clade: Eudicots
- Clade: Asterids
- Order: Apiales
- Family: Apiaceae
- Genus: Afrosciadium
- Species: A. eylesii

Binomial name
- Afrosciadium eylesii (C.Norman) P.J.D.Winter (2008)

Synonyms
- Peucedanum eylesii C.Norman (1932)

= Afrosciadium eylesii =

Species of flowering plant

Afrosciadium eylesii is a member of the carrot family, Apiaceae. It is a perennial tuberous herb native to southeastern Africa, from the Democratic Republic of the Congo and Tanzania to Zimbabwe and Mozambique.

Afrosciadium eylesii was previously classified as Peucedanum eylesii before the genus Afrosciadium was established in 2008.

Afrosciadium eylesii is found between roughly 1,750 to 2,100 meters above sea level, in damp tropical grasslands in southeastern Africa. It grows to between 1 and 2 meters tall, with a purple-tinged woody stem. It boasts flowers with small, elliptical petals, roughly 1 millimeter long, of a yellow or yellow-green color. The tuberous root is stout and woody.
