= George Murray (naturalist) =

Scottish naturalist (1858–1911)

George Robert Milne Murray FRS FRSE FLS
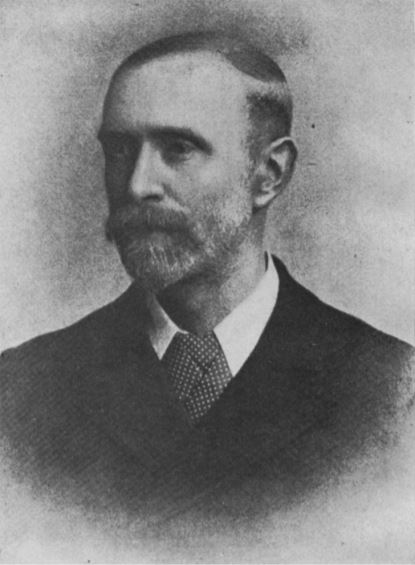
- Murray, c. 1900s
- Born: 11 November 1858; Arbroath, Forfarshire, Scotland
- Died: 16 December 1911 (aged 53); Stonehaven, Kincardineshire, Scotland
- Education: University of Strasbourg
- Scientific career
- Fields: Botany
- Workplaces: British Museum; Natural History Museum
- Author abbrev. (botany): G.Murray

George Robert Milne Murray FRS FRSE FLS (11 November 1858 – 16 December 1911) was a Scottish naturalist, botanist, diatomist and algologist, noted for his association with T. H. Huxley and with the Discovery Expedition. He was the naturalist aboard the solar eclipse expedition to the West Indies in 1886, and was a member of several scientific voyages for the collection of marine organisms, leading valuable work on the Atlantic coast of Ireland in 1898.

== Life ==
Murray was born in Arbroath, Angus, the son of George Murray, a tradesman, and his wife, Helen Margaret Sayles.

He was educated at Arbroath High School. In 1875, he studied cryptogamic botany at the University of Strasbourg under Anton de Bary. He became an assistant in the Department of Botany at the Natural History Museum, succeeding William Carruthers as Keeper of Botany in 1895.

The Linnean Society of London elected him a Fellow in 1878. He was elected a Fellow of the Royal Society of Edinburgh. His proposers were Sir Isaac Bayley Balfour, Frederick Orpen Bower, George Chrystal and Sir John Murray. He was elected a member of the Royal Society in 1897.

He retired in 1905 due to ill health and died in Stonehaven, Kincardineshire, on 16 December 1911.

== Family ==
In 1884 he married Helen Welsh (d.1902).

== Publications ==
He wrote, with A. W. Bennett, A Handbook of Cryptogamic Botany (1889) and, as sole author, An Introduction to the Study of Seaweeds (1895), and published about forty articles on cryptogams and oceanography, mostly in the Journal of Botany.

Murray edited 'The Antarctic Manual' in 1901 and set out on Robert Falcon Scott's National Antarctic Expedition of that year although leaving the 'Discovery' at Cape Town.
