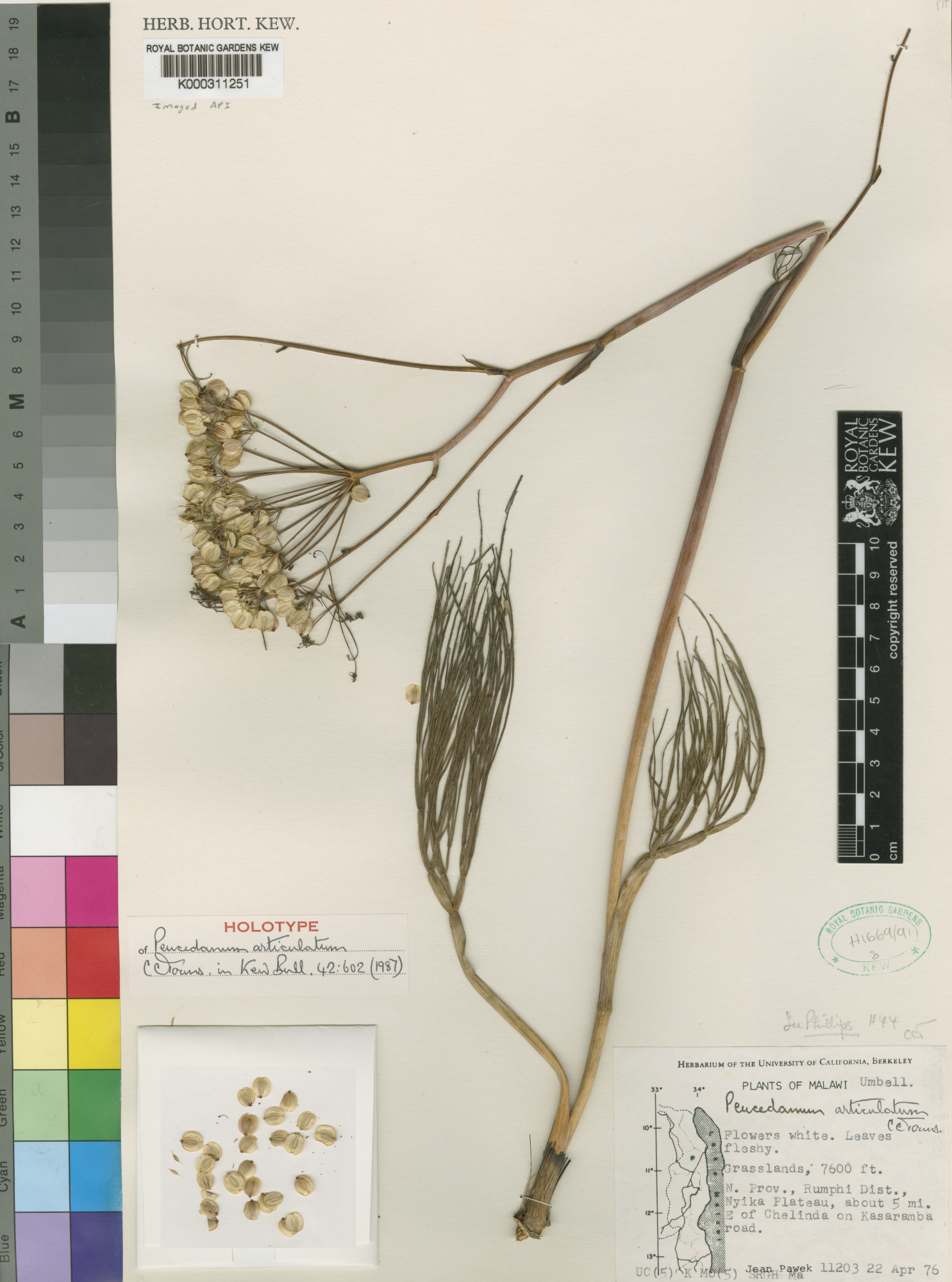

Scientific classification
- Kingdom: Plantae
- Clade: Tracheophytes
- Clade: Angiosperms
- Clade: Eudicots
- Clade: Asterids
- Order: Apiales
- Family: Apiaceae
- Genus: Afrosciadium
- Species: A. articulatum

Binomial name
- Afrosciadium articulatum (C.C.Towns.) P.J.D.Winter (2008)

Synonyms
- Peucedanum articulatum C.C.Towns. (1987)

= Afrosciadium articulatum =

Species of flowering plant

Afrosciadium articulatum, synonym Peucedanum articulatum, is a member of the carrot family, Apiaceae. It is native to northern Malawi.
