= Lefebvrea angustisecta =

Conservation status
- Near Threatened (IUCN 2.3)

Scientific classification
- Kingdom: Plantae
- Clade: Tracheophytes
- Clade: Angiosperms
- Clade: Eudicots
- Clade: Asterids
- Order: Apiales
- Family: Apiaceae
- Genus: Lefebvrea
- Species: L. angustisecta

Binomial name
- Lefebvrea angustisecta Engl.

Synonyms
- Lefebvrea camerunensis (Jacq.-Fél.) Cheek & I.Darbysh.; Lefebvrea kupensis (I.Darbysh. & Cheek) Cheek & I.Darbysh.; Peucedanum angustisectum (Engl.) C.Norman; Peucedanum camerunense Jacq.-Fél.; Peucedanum kupense I.Darbysh. & Cheek

Species of flowering plant

Lefebvrea angustisecta, synonyms including Peucedanum angustisectum, is a species of flowering plant in the family Apiaceae. It is endemic to Cameroon. Its natural habitat is subtropical or tropical dry lowland grassland.

== Conservation ==
Lefebvrea angustisecta was assessed as "near threatened" in the 2000 IUCN Red List. Separately, Lefebvrea camerunensis was assessed as "endangered" in 2000 and Lefebvrea kupensis was assessed as "vulnerable" in 2004. As of January 2024, Plants of the World Online treated both L. camerunensis and L. kupensis as synonyms of L. angustisecta.
