= J. F. M. Cannon =

British botanist (1930–2008)

- Born: John Francis Michael Cannon; 22 April 1930
- Died: 31 March 2008 (aged 77)
- Spouse: Margaret Joy Cannon
- Awards: President of the Botanical Society of the British Isles (1983–1985)
- Scientific career
- Fields: Botany
- Workplaces: Natural History Museum
- Author abbrev. (botany): Cannon

John Francis Michael Cannon (22 April 1930 – 31 March 2008) was a British botanist who held the role of Keeper of Botany at the Natural History Museum between 1978 and 1990.

Cannon joined the Department of Botany at the British Museum (Natural History), as it was then known, in October 1952. He was appointed as a scientific officer in the 'General Herbarium', with responsibility for one of the four sections into which the herbarium was divided. These were families 67 (Myrtaceae) to 107 (Asclepiadaceae). The following year he was given responsibility for planning and building a major new botany gallery – the first exhibition to be constructed in the museum following serious bomb damage during the Second World war. It reflected a new approach to making museum natural history more accessible to a general audience, and was opened by Queen Elizabeth The Queen Mother on 31 October 1962 and dismantled 20 years later.

Cannon was made Senior Scientific Officer in 1956, Principal Scientific Officer in 1964, and Keeper of Botany in 1977. He specialised in the study of Apiaceae (Parsley Family), especially African species. Cannon retired from the museum in 1990.

He was president of the Botanical Society of the British Isles from 1983 to 1985.

== Publications ==
- Cannon, J. F. M.; Bangerter, E. B. (1968). "Plant records from Mull and the adjacent small islands" (PDF). Proceedings of the Botanical Society of the British Isles. 7 (3): 365–372.
- Cannon, J. F. M. (1962). "The new botanical exhibition gallery at the British Museum (Natural History)". Curator. 6: 26–35.
- 'CANNON, John Francis Michael', Who Was Who, A & C Black, 1920–2008; online ed., Oxford University Press, Dec 2009; online ed., Nov 2009. Accessed 19 May 2011.
