= Ghosts in Tibetan culture =

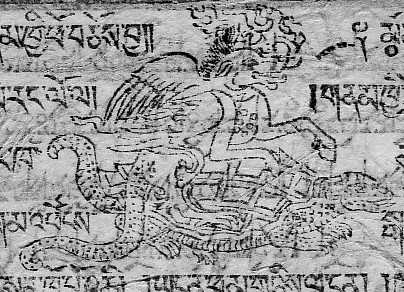
Tibetan ghost Nam-khyi nag-po according to an old Tibetan blockprint of the Vaidurya dkar-po (1685)

Tibetan culture includes a widespread belief in ghosts. Ghosts are explicitly recognized in the Tibetan Buddhist religion as they were in Indian Buddhism, occupying a distinct but overlapping world to the human one, and feature in many traditional legends. When a human dies, after a period of uncertainty they may enter the ghost world. A hungry ghost (Tibetan: yidag, yi-dvags; Sanskrit: preta, प्रेत) has a tiny throat and huge stomach, and so can never be satisfied. Ghosts may be killed with a ritual dagger or caught in a spirit trap and burnt, thus releasing them to be reborn. Ghosts may also be exorcised, and an annual festival is held throughout Tibet for this purpose.

== Nature of ghosts ==
Tibetan Buddhists believe that when a person dies, they enter the intermediate Bardo state, from which they may be reborn in this world in a human or animal body, in the ghost world in a ghost body, in one of the paradise realms or in one of the hells. But eventually, the person will die in this after-death world and be reborn as a human or other creature unless they achieve Nirvana, where they are beyond all states of embodiment.

Hungry ghosts have their own realm depicted on the Bhavacakra and are represented as teardrop or paisley-shaped with bloated stomachs and necks too thin to pass food, so that attempting to eat is also incredibly painful. Some are described as having "mouths the size of a needle's eye and a stomach the size of a mountain". This is a metaphor for people futilely attempting to fulfill their illusory physical desires. Buddha taught that the principal causes of rebirth as a hungry ghost are greed and negative actions motivated by miserliness. The consequence of these actions is extreme poverty. If by chance they come across a drop of water or a scrap of food it disappears like a mirage, or transforms into something repulsive such as pus or urine. These appearances are due to their negative karma and lack of merit. Sometime individuals have a predominance of hungry ghost in their makeup. They can never get enough, and are always hungry for more. The Tibetan word for the emotional state of the hungry ghost, ser na, literally means "yellow nosed", and could be said to mean "meanness" or "lack of generosity". The person in this state is constantly seeking to consume and to enrich themselves, but can never be satisfied.

== Dealing with ghosts ==
=== Phurba ===
The phurba (Tibetan: ཕུར་བ, Sanskrit: kīla) is a ritual dagger used by a tantric practitioner to release an evil spirit from its suffering and guide it to a better rebirth. Such a spirit (ghost) is a being which lingers in confusion between different realms. By plunging the dagger into it, it is thrown out of its confusion and gets the chance to be reborn, probably as a lower kind than human.

=== Spirit traps ===
Families often mount ghost-traps (Namkha) on the roofs of their houses, spindle-like contraptions wound with colored yarns. A spirit trap may also be hung in a tree. The series of interlocking threads is thought to ensnare the spirit, and is burnt when the job is done.

=== Exorcising-Ghost day ===
The Tibetan religious ceremony 'Gutor' ༼དགུ་གཏོར་༽, literally offering of the 29th, is held on the 29th of the 12th Tibetan month, with its focus on driving out all negativity, including evil spirits and misfortunes of the past year, and starting the new year in a peaceful and auspicious way.

The temples and monasteries throughout Tibet hold grand religious dance ceremonies, with the largest at Potala Palace in Lhasa. Families clean their houses on this day, decorate the rooms and eat a special noodle soup called 'Guthuk'. ༼དགུ་ཐུག་༽ In the evening, the people carry torches, calling out the words of exorcism.

== A folk tale ==
A story tells of a man who met a ghost while out walking. The ghost started walking with him, which made him very frightened, although he hid his fear and pretended that he too was a ghost. They came to a town. The ghost left the man resting, entered the town and stole the soul of the king's son, tying it up in a yak hair sack. Returning to the man, the ghost left the sack in his care for a while. The man took the sack into the town, where the king was in great alarm because his son was dying. The man promised to revive the boy, conducting rituals and at the same time releasing the boy's soul from the bag. When the boy revived, the king gave the man half of all his property as reward.

== See also ==
- Paritta
- Phurba
- Preta
- sacca-kiriya
- Sak Yant
- Tibetan Buddhism
- Yaktovil
- Yama (Buddhism)
