= Gaki =

Gaki may refer to:

- The Japanese word for Preta
- A pen-name of Akutagawa Ryunosuke
