= Snailwell Meadows =

Meadow in the United Kingdom

Coordinates: 52.284°N 0.4°E

- Site of Special Scientific Interest
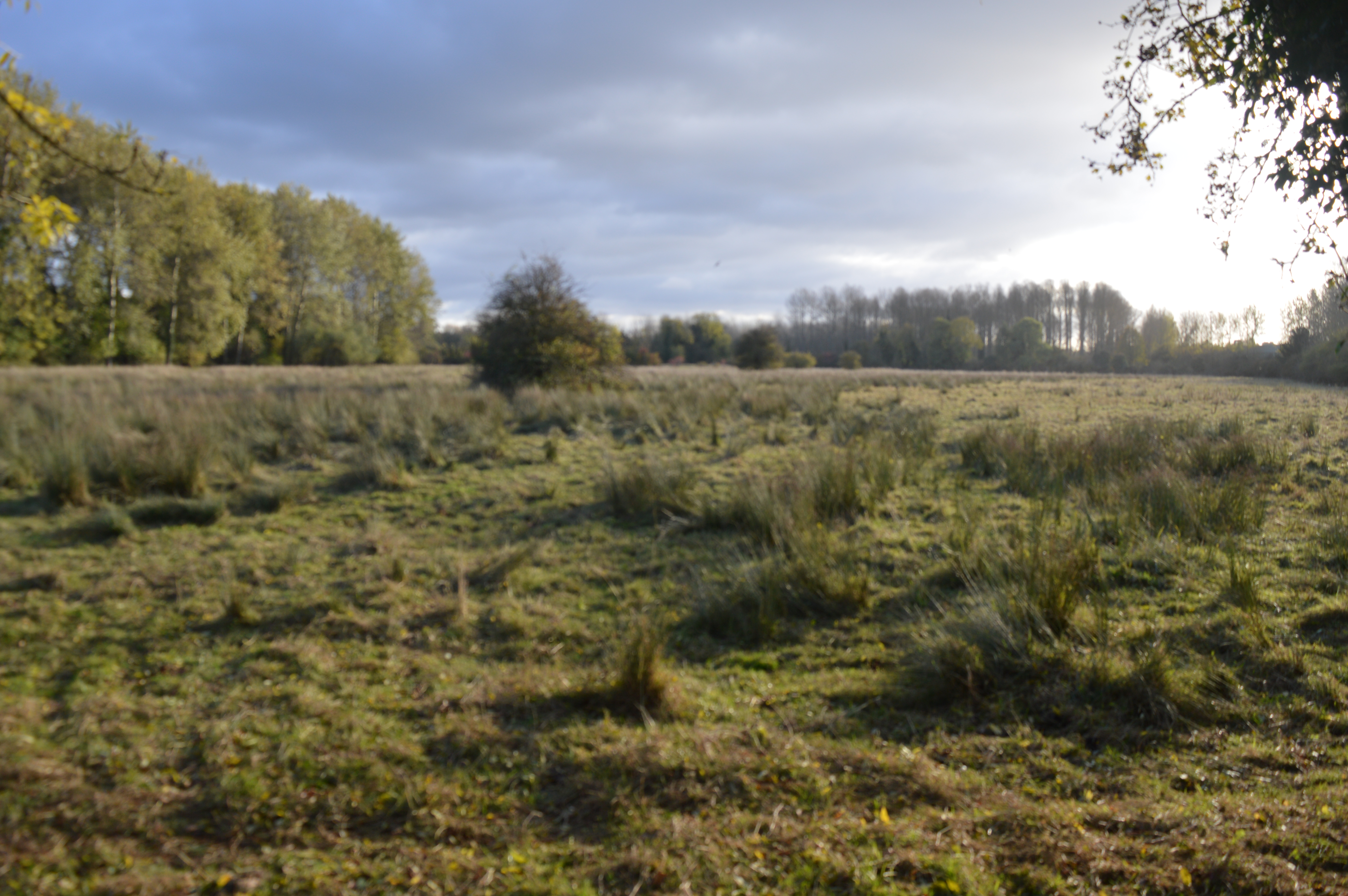
- Location of Snailwell Meadows.
- Area of search: Cambridgeshire
- Grid reference: TL 638 678
- Interest: Biological
- Area: 14.8 hectares
- Notification date: 1985
- Location map: Magic Map

Snailwell Meadows is a 14.8-hectare (37-acre) biological Site of Special Scientific Interest in Snailwell in Cambridgeshire.

The meadows are on peat overlying spring-fed chalk, with a variety of soil conditions. Some areas are dry calcareous pasture, and others are wet neutral and marshy acidic grassland. Herbs include wild angelica, marsh valerian and fen bedstraw, and the nationally rare umbellifer Cambridge milk-parsley is also present.

The site is private land with no public access.
