= Bhoota (supernatural) =

Spirit of a deceased person in South and Southeast Asia

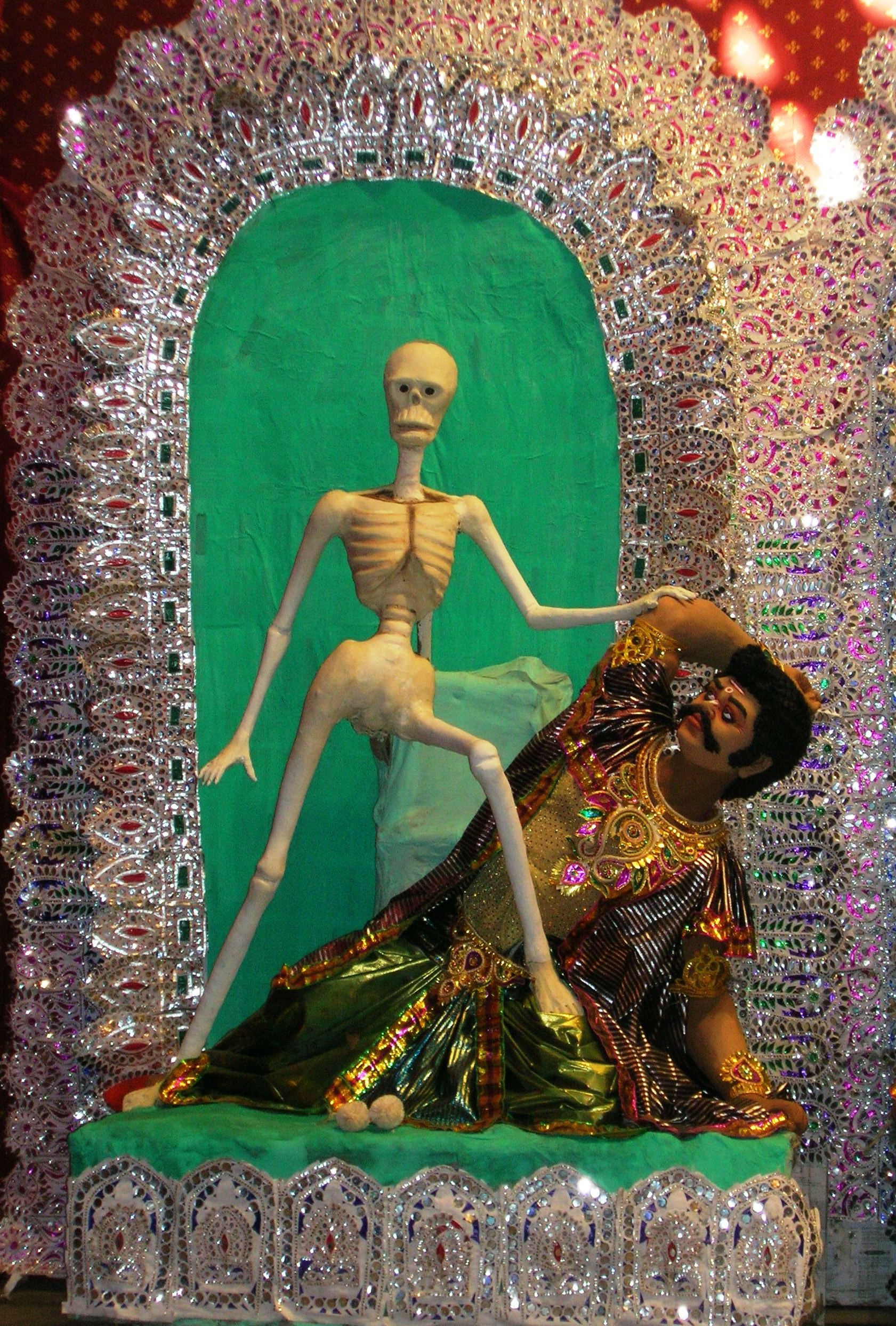
A bhoota depicted during Kali Puja.

A bhoota (Sanskrit: भूत, bhūta) is a supernatural creature, usually the ghost of a deceased person, in the popular culture, literature and some ancient texts of the Indian subcontinent. Interpretations of how bhootas come into existence vary by region and community, but they are usually considered to be perturbed and restless due to some factor that prevents them from moving on (to transmigration, non-being, nirvana, or swarga or naraka, depending on tradition). This could be a violent death, unsettled matters in their lives, or simply the failure of their survivors to perform proper funerals.

Belief in ghosts has been deeply ingrained in the minds of the people of the subcontinent for generations. There are many allegedly haunted places in the subcontinent, such as cremation grounds, dilapidated buildings, palaces, havelis, forts, forest bungalows, burning ghats, etc. Ghosts also occupy a significant place in Bengali culture. Ghosts and various supernatural entities form an integral part of the socio-cultural beliefs of both the Muslim and Hindu communities of Bangladesh and the Indian state of West Bengal. Fairy tales often use the concept of ghosts and references to paranormal activity are found amply in modern-day Bengali literature, cinema, radio and TV programmes. In Pakistan, the word jinn is used to refer to both the Arabic jinns as well as bhootas. Influenced by Arabic and Persian mythology, bhootas in the Pakistani society have a more varied and fluid identity, ranging from jinns from another realm made of fire, to ghosts of humans who died painful deaths.

== Etymology and idiom ==
Bhūta is a Sanskrit term that carries the connotations of "past" and "being" and, because it has connection with "one of the most wide-spread roots in Indo-European — namely, *bheu/*bhu-", has similar-sounding cognates in virtually every branch of that language family, e.g., Welsh (bod), Irish (bha), English (be), Latvian (but) and Persian (budan).

In Hinduism, bhuta also refers to group of five basic elements called Pancha Bhuta (/pəɲt͡ʃəbʱuːt̪ᵊ/ ,Sanskrit: पञ्चभूत; pañca bhūta), which, in Hinduism, is the basis of all cosmic creation. These elements are: Prithvi (Sanskrit: पृथ्वी:, Earth), Jal (Sanskrit: आपः, Water), Agni (Sanskrit: अग्नि, Fire), Vayu (Sanskrit: वायु:, Air), Akasha (Sanskrit: आकाश, Aether). In Ayurveda and Indian philosophy, the human body is made of these five elements.

In Hindustani, Punjabi, Kashmiri, Bengali, Sindhi and other languages of the northern subcontinent, the concept of bhoots is extensively used in idiom. To be "ridden by the bhoot of something" (bhoot sawaar hona) means to take an obsessive interest in that thing or work unrelentingly towards that goal. Conversely, to "dismount a bhoot" (bhoot utaarna) means to break through an obsession or see through a false belief that was previously dearly held. "To look like a bhoot" (bhoot lagna) means to look disheveled and unkempt or to dress ridiculously. A house or building that is untidy, unmaintained or deserted when it should not be is sometimes pejoratively called a bhoot bangla.

The word has travelled far into Southeast Asia: it entered Javanese through Sanskrit as buta generally referring to a malevolent spirit/demonic giant which haunts places, it also refers to the genre of evil giants in wayang stories such as Buta Cakil. It has also undergone an evolution in the Malay world to mean a jinn-like creature mentioned in the as Malay Annals; there is a legend of such a creature that dwells in the plains of the Perak River with similar traits albeit of gigantic size giving its name to a town in north of the Malay Peninsula named Bota.

== Characteristics of bhootas ==
Bhootas are able to shape-shift into various animal forms at will, but are most often seen in human shape. However, their feet often reveal them to be ghosts, since they face backwards. As the earth is regarded as sacred or semi-sacred in many traditions of the Indian subcontinent, bhootas will go to great lengths to avoid contact with it, often floating a fraction above it, although sometimes as much as a foot off the ground. Furthermore bhootas cast no shadows, and speak with a nasal twang. They often lurk in the branches of specific trees and prefer to appear in white clothing. Sometimes bhootas haunt specific houses (the so-called bhoot banglas, i.e. bhoot bungalows), which are typically the places where they were killed or places which hold some other deep significance for them.

Many ghost stories in the region combine these elements. For instance, they might involve a protagonist who fails to flee or take countermeasures when they run across a bhoota. Instead, they unwittingly accept the bhoota's companionship (e.g., keep the ghost company as he/she walks through a forest, or (if a man) picks up the ghost in his car because it looks like an attractive woman waiting by the roadside at night). They become progressively aware that their companion is dressed entirely in white and has a strangely nasal voice, before the horrifying realization dawns on them that their companion's feet are turned backwards, or he/she is not casting a shadow in the moonlight, or is walking without actually touching the ground. Bhootas are said to seek out milk and immerse themselves in it. Consuming bhoota-contaminated milk is considered a typical route for bhoota- possession of humans, which has also been a frequent plot element in bhoota stories.

A particular kind of bhoota, that of a woman who died during pregnancy or childbirth, is known as a churel. Churels look like human women, but their feet are turned backwards or other features are turned upside down. They can change their forms at any time. Churel often try to lure young men at road crossings and fields or similar places. If a man is enamored of a churel, it is believed that she will cause his death. There are, however, stories of people living with a churel, or even marrying one.

== Thwarting bhootas ==
In many regions, bhootas are said to fear water and objects made iron or steel, so keeping either of these near at hand is believed to afford protection against them. The scent of burnt turmeric is also said to ward them off - as are the fibres of the Apiaceous herb bhutkeshi (= "bhoota's hair"). As is typical of ghosts throughout the world, invoking the name of holy figures and deities is also said to repel bhootas. In some regions, sprinkling earth on oneself is said to shield against bhootas. According to Hinduism and all Dharmic Religions, the soul cannot be destroyed by any means. As a bhootaa is just the lost, or angry soul of a deceased person, Hindu exorcists will not (or cannot) destroy them, but perform instead a ritual from the Atharva Veda called atma-shanti which is just a modified Śrāddha (death anniversary) carried out by those haunted by a bhoota, promising it that they will do everything in their power either to ensure the rebirth of the bhoota or to finish the works left incomplete by it (or both). Such actions provide the bhoota with what it wants, causing it to cease haunting its victim for good.

== Bhutas ==
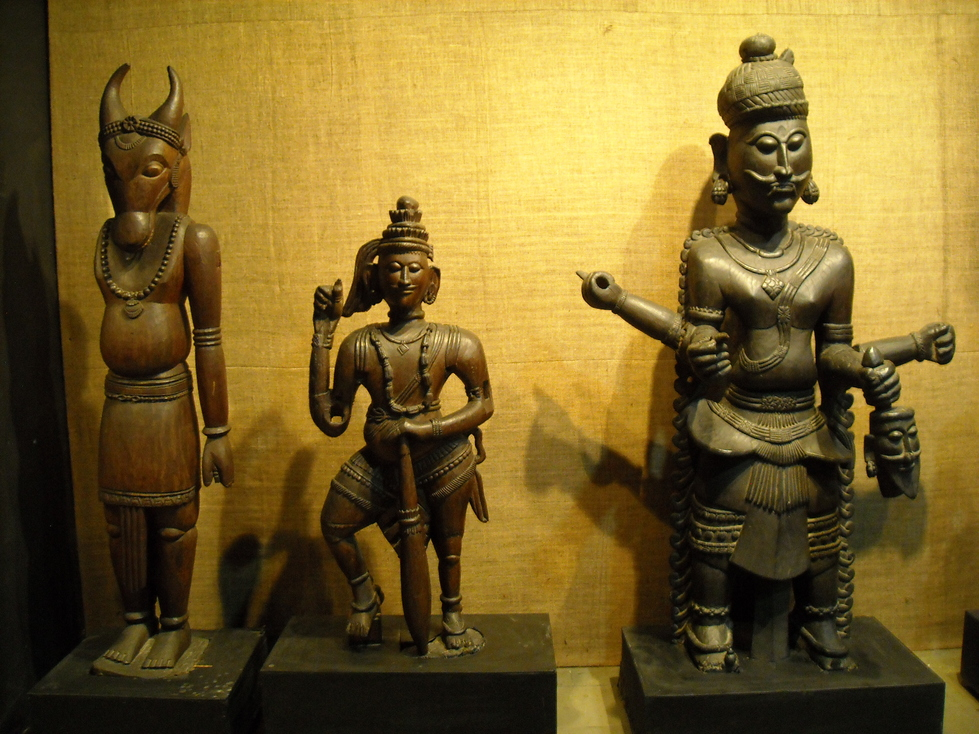
View of the bhuta gallery, Crafts Museum, New Delhi, India

The bhutas, spirits of deified heroes, of fierce and evil beings, of Hindu deities and of animals, etc., are wrongly referred to as "ghosts" or "demons" and, in fact, are protective and benevolent beings. Though it is true that they can cause harm in their violent forms, as they are extremely powerful, they can be pacified through worship or offerings referred to as Bhuta Aradhana.

== In Literature ==
- Rudrayamala Tantra, Kaulajnananirnaya): Discuss various spirits, their invocation, and control for spiritual or worldly purposes.
- Garuda Purana, contains a minor yet significant text or section Preta Kalpa, providing detailed instructions on dealing with Preta spirits.
- Bhootatantra, it provides detailed methods for invoking, controlling, or exorcising spirits like Bhūta (general term for ghosts), Pretas (restless spirits), and Piśāchas (ghoulish spirits)
- Karna Pishachini Tantra
- Vetala Panchavimshati is a collection of tales and legends within a frame story, from India. Internationally, it is also known as Vikram-Vetala.
- "Pretasiddhanta": Treatises on preta (ghosts) and ways to liberate them. No authentic copy available.
- "Vetala Tantra": Focused on controlling spirits like vetalas.

== In popular culture ==
Many shows across South Asia have been based on stories and legends of bhootas.

- Thakurmar Jhuli - the most classic collection of Bengali children's folk-tales and fairy-tales, which was compiled by Dakshinaranjan Mitra Majumder in 1907. It is popular both in Bangladesh and West Bengal.
- Bhoot FM- hosted by RJ Russell, was a live radio program called aired by Bangladeshi radio channel Radio Foorti This program came to an end in the year 2019 but right now another program named "Bhoot Dot COM" is being hosted by RJ Russell aired by Shadhin Radio.
- Woh Kya Hai ("What is that?") – A Pakistani reality show where the host investigates haunted locations throughout Pakistan and records the activities.
- Saaya ("Shadow") – A Pakistani horror drama revolving around black magic, possession, demons, and ghosts.
- Aahat ("An Approaching Sound") – An Indian thriller/horror anthology series focusing on many supernatural stories, including those of bhootas.
- Pett Kata Shaw- a 2021 Bangladeshi anthology series released on Chorki (OTT)

The Shudder original V/H/S/99 has one of the characters reference the bhuta and even uses turmeric to burn one of the ghouls.

== See also ==
- Garuda Purana
- Ghosts in Bengali culture
- Ghosts in Tibetan culture
- Kanjirottu Yakshi
- List of ghosts
- List of superstitions in India
- Preta, vetala and pishacha
- Yakshini
