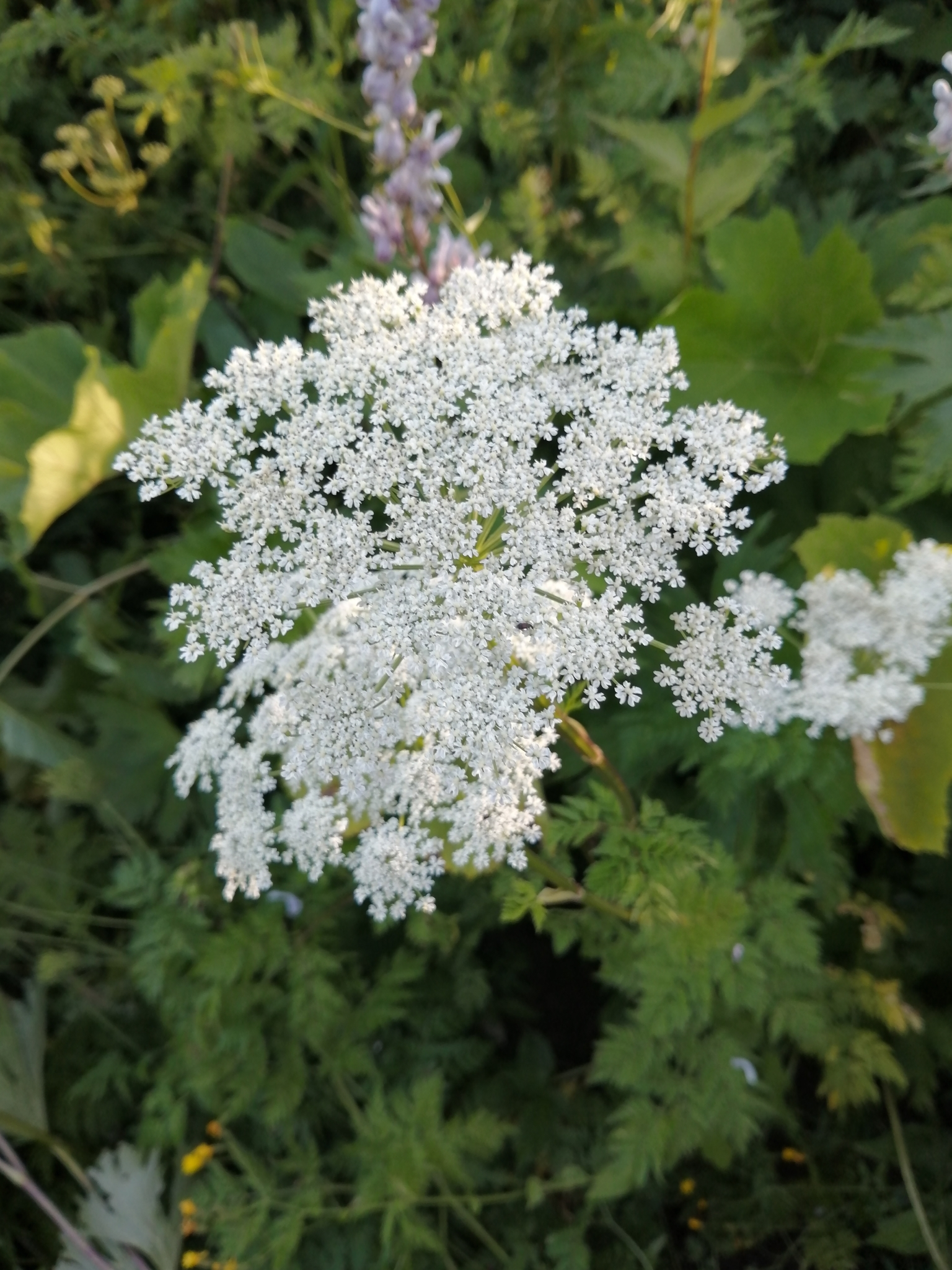
- Selinum alatum

Scientific classification
- Kingdom: Plantae
- Clade: Tracheophytes
- Clade: Angiosperms
- Clade: Eudicots
- Clade: Asterids
- Order: Apiales
- Family: Apiaceae
- Subfamily: Apioideae
- Tribe: Selineae
- Genus: Selinum; L.

Synonyms
- Allinum Neck.; Anthosciadium Fenzl ex Endl.; Carvi Bernh.; Carvifolia C.Bauhin ex Vill.; Epikeros Raf.; Macrosciadium V.N.Tikhom. & Lavrova; Micrangelia Fourr.; Mylinum Gaudin, nom. superfl.

= Selinum =

Genus of plants

Selinum is a Eurasiatic genus of flowering plants in the parsley family Apiaceae.

== Species ==
As of December 2022, Plants of the World Online accepted the following species:

- Selinum alatum (M.Bieb.) Poir.
- Selinum broteroi Hoffmanns. & Link
- Selinum carvifolia (L.) L. (Note: As of December 2022, Plants of the World Online spelt the epithet carvifolium. Other sources, including the International Plant Names Index, used carvifolia. Linnaeus capitalized the epithet, suggesting it was a noun in apposition rather than an adjective.) – Cambridge milk-parsley or little-leaf angelica
- Selinum coniifolium (Boiss.) Leute
- Selinum cryptotaenium H.Boissieu
- Selinum filicifolium (Edgew.) Nasir
- Selinum longicalycium M.L.Sheh
- Selinum pauciradium (Sommier & Levier) Leute
- Selinum physospermifolium (Albov) Hand
- Selinum rhodopetalum (Pimenov & Kljuykov) Hand
- Selinum vaginatum (Edgew.) C.B.Clarke

Species formerly placed in the genus include:

- Selinum wallichianum – synonym of Ligusticopsis wallichiana
- Selinum tenuifolium – another synonym of Ligusticopsis wallichiana

== Folk-medicinal and ritual uses ==
Several Himalayan species belonging to the genus are both taken internally and burnt as dhoop or incense as sedatives to soothe mental turmoil of various kinds in Tantric rituals. Given that aphrodisiac properties are also reported they may also be used in practices related to sex magic / sacred sexuality. They are aromatic and mildly psychoactive without being unduly toxic - some species are recorded as having been used both as human food and cattle fodder.
