= Jikininki =

Short story by Lafcadio Hearn

Jikininki (食人鬼, "human-eating ghosts") appear in Lafcadio Hearn's Kwaidan: Stories and Studies of Strange Things (1904) as corpse-eating spirits. In Japanese Buddhism, jikininki ("human-eating ghosts"; pronounced shokujinki in modern Japanese), are similar to Gaki/Hungry ghost; the spirits of greedy, selfish or impious individuals who are cursed after death to seek out and eat humans and human corpses.

A similar story can be found as "Aozukin" in Ueda Akinari's Ugetsu Monogatari from 1776.

== Story ==
It is said that there was a monk/priest, named Muso, who was traveling alone through the mountains in the Mino prefecture of Japan, when he lost his way. It was almost dark when he saw, up on a hill, an old Anjitsu (庵室, lit. "Hermitage residence"), the home of solitary priests. He walked to the top of the hill and asked the inhabitant if he could stay the night. The only inhabitant was an old priest, who harshly refused Muso lodgings for the night; however, he told Muso that he could find food and a place to sleep down in a hamlet, nearby.

Muso found the hamlet, where the headman welcomed him and promptly supplied him food and a place to sleep. A little before midnight that night, Muso was awakened by a young man, one of the villagers, who informed him that, earlier that day, before Muso had arrived, his father had died. The young man had not told Muso earlier so he would not feel embarrassed or obliged to participate in ceremonies. However, the entire village was now leaving their homes for a nearby village, as it was custom to leave the corpse alone for the night or else bad things would befall the village inhabitants. As a priest, Muso told the young man he would do his duty and perform the burial services and stay the night with the corpse. He was not afraid of the demons or evil spirits the young man spoke of.

When the young man and the other villagers had left, Muso knelt by the corpse and the offerings and began the service. In the deepest part of the night, Ushi no toki mairi, a shapeless being entered, while Muso was deep in meditation. Muso could not speak or move as he watched the shapeless being devour the corpse and the offerings. The next morning when the villagers had returned, Muso told the young man what had happened. The young man was not surprised.

Muso then asked the young man why the priest up on the nearby hill did not do the ceremony. Confused, the young man told Muso that there was no priest who lived nearby and that there hadn't been for many years. When Muso spoke of the Anjitsu, the young man also denied its existence. Muso then departed from the village, now with proper directions to continue his journey.

Before he left the area, Muso sought out the Anjitsu and the old priest living within it upon the hilltop to see if he had indeed been mistaken. He found the hill and Anjitsu easily, and the old priest let him inside this time. The old priest then began to apologize for displaying his true form in front of Muso; he was the shapeless figure who had devoured the corpse in front of Muso the night-before. The old priest went on to explain that he was now a Jikininki and how he had come to be one; after living a long, selfish life as a priest, only caring about the food and clothes his services had brought him-even at the expense of others in more need of them then he had been-after his death, the old priest had been reborn into the world as a Jikininki, doomed to feed upon the fresh corpses of others. The old priest then pleaded with Muso to perform a Segaki Requiem service for him, so that he could finally escape his horrible existence as a Jikininki. As Muso performed the service, all of a sudden the old priest disappeared along with the Anjitsu. Muso found himself kneeling in the long grass upon the top of a hill before a tombstone of a priest and the ruins of the Anjitsu.

The Jikiniki exist somewhere between the living and the dead. They show up like ghosts and their dwelling are invisible during the day. They show up mostly to lost travelers who are lost at night. They often stay close to human settlement because they devour humans. The Jikiniki do not enjoy eating humans but it takes away some of the pain for a little while.

== See also ==
- Gashadokuro
- Ghoul
- Hungry ghost
