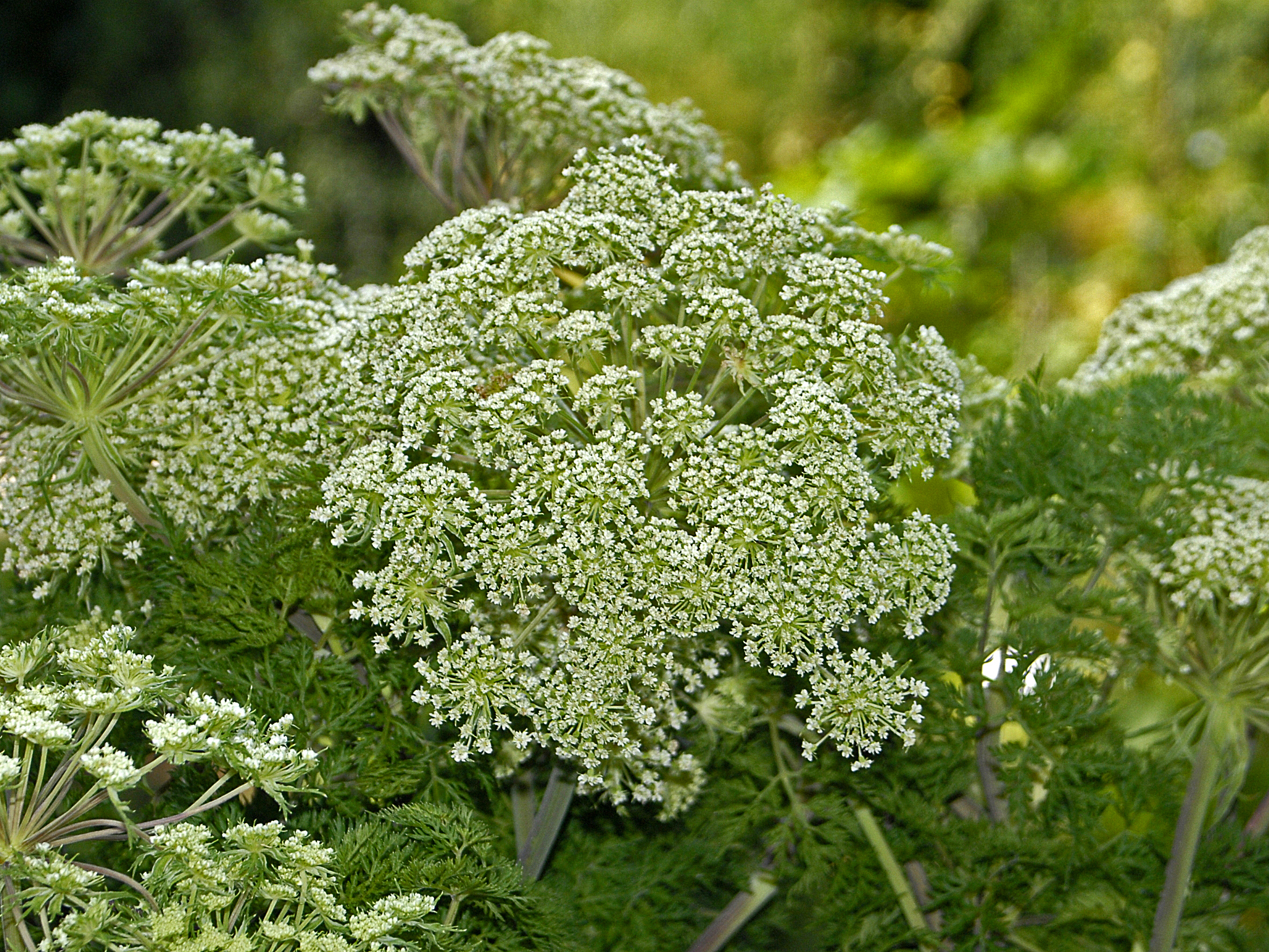
- Ligusticopsis wallichiana at the Orto Botanico di Brera, Milano

Scientific classification
- Kingdom: Plantae
- Clade: Tracheophytes
- Clade: Angiosperms
- Clade: Eudicots
- Clade: Asterids
- Order: Apiales
- Family: Apiaceae
- Subfamily: Apioideae
- Tribe: Selineae
- Genus: Ligusticopsis; Leute

= Ligusticopsis =

Genus of plants

Ligusticopsis is a genus of flowering plants belonging to the family Apiaceae.

Its native range is Himalaya to China and Myanmar.

Species:

- Ligusticopsis acaulis (R.H.Shan & M.L.Sheh) Pimenov
- Ligusticopsis angelicifolia (Franch.) Leute
- Ligusticopsis brachyloba (Franch.) Leute
- Ligusticopsis capillacea (M.Hiroe) Leute
- Ligusticopsis daucoides (Franch.) Lavrova ex Pimenov & Kljuykov
- Ligusticopsis deqenensis (R.H.Shan & Z.H.Pan) Pimenov
- Ligusticopsis hispida (Franch.) Lavrova & Kljuykov
- Ligusticopsis involucrata (Franch.) Lavrova
- Ligusticopsis likiangensis (H.Wolff) Lavrova & Kljuykov
- Ligusticopsis longiloba (H.Wolff) Leute
- Ligusticopsis multivittata (Franch.) Leute
- Ligusticopsis pseudodaucoides (H.Peng & Yin Z.Wang) Pimenov & Kljuykov
- Ligusticopsis purpurascens Lavrova & Kljuykov
- Ligusticopsis rechingeriana Leute
- Ligusticopsis scapiformis (H.Wolff) Leute
- Ligusticopsis wallichiana (DC.) Pimenov & Kljuykov
- Ligusticopsis xizangensis (Z.H.Pan & M.L.Sheh) Pimenov & Kljuykov
