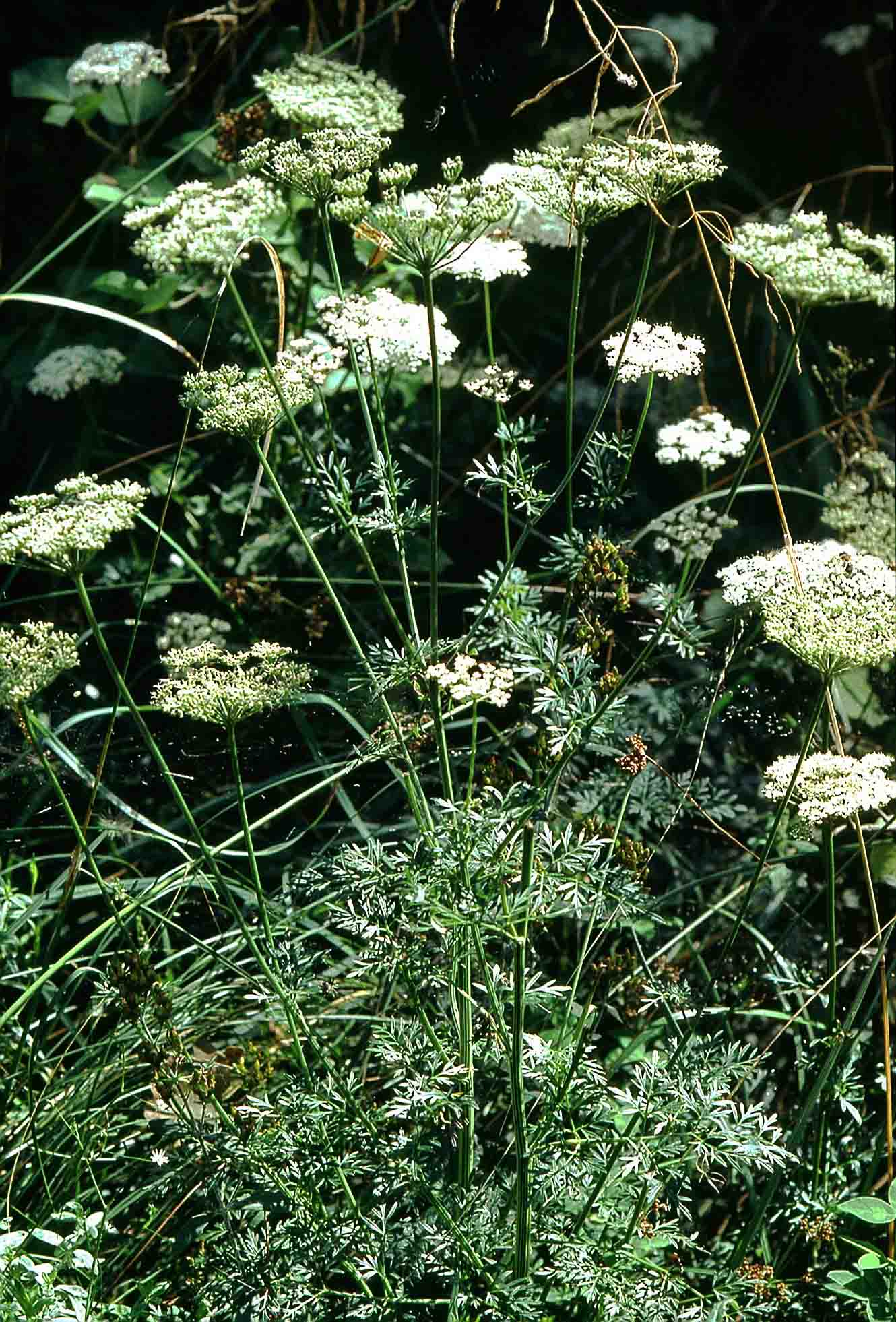

Scientific classification
- Kingdom: Plantae
- Clade: Tracheophytes
- Clade: Angiosperms
- Clade: Eudicots
- Clade: Asterids
- Order: Apiales
- Family: Apiaceae
- Genus: Selinum
- Species: S. carvifolia

Binomial name
- Selinum carvifolia (L.) L.

Synonyms
- Angelica carvifolia var. pratensis Wallr.; Angelica carvifolia var. prolifera Klett & Richt.; Angelica carvifolia var. sylvatica Wallr., not validly publ.; Angelica carvifolia (L.) Vill.; Athamanta carvifolia (L.) Weber; Carum sulcatum Steud.; Carvi sulcatum Bernh., nom. superfl.; Cnidium carvifolium (L.) M.Bieb.; Laserpitium selinoides Scop., nom. illeg.; Ligusticum carvifolia Caruel; Mylinum carvifolium (L.) Gaudin; Oreoselinum pseudocarvifolium Hoffm.; Peucedanum cuneifolium Vill. ex Steud., not validly publ.; Selinon carvifolium (L.) St.-Lag.; Selinum acutangulum Gilib.; Selinum angulatum Lam.; Selinum carvifolia-linnaei Jacq., nom. superfl.; Selinum membranaceum Vill.; Selinum pratense Röhl., nom. illeg.; Selinum pseudocarvifolia All.; Selinum seguirei Baumg.; Selinum silvaticum Röhl.; Selinum tenuifolium Salisb.; Seseli carvifolia L., nom. cons.

= Selinum carvifolia =

Species of plant

Selinum carvifolia is a flowering plant of the genus Selinum in the family Apiaceae. The specific name carvifolia signifies 'having leaves resembling those of Caraway'. It is a plant of fens and damp meadows, growing in most of Europe, with the exception of much of the Mediterranean region, eastwards to Central Asia. Its common name in English is Cambridge milk parsley, because it is confined, in the UK, to the county of Cambridgeshire and closely resembles milk parsley (Peucedanum palustre), an umbellifer of another genus, but found in similar habitats. The two plants are not only similar in appearance, but also grow in similar moist habitats, although they may be told apart in the following manner: P. palustre has hollow, often purplish stems, pinnatifid leaf lobes and deflexed bracteoles; while S. carvifolia has solid, greenish stems, entire or sometimes lobed leaf-lobes and erecto-patent bracteoles. Also, when the two plants are in fruit, another difference becomes apparent: the three dorsal ridges on the fruit of S. carvifolia are winged, while those on the fruit of P. palustre are not. Yet a further difference lies in the respective leaflets of the plants : those of Peucedanum palustre are blunt and pale at the tip, while those of Selinum carvifolia are sharply pointed and of a darker green. S. carvifolia used also to occur in the English counties of Nottinghamshire and Lincolnshire but is now extinct in both. Growing in only three small Cambridgeshire fens, it is one of England's rarest umbellifers. It is naturalized in the United States, where it is known by the common name little-leaf angelica.

== Taxonomy ==
The species was first described by Carl Linnaeus in 1753 as Seseli carvifolia. In 1762, he transferred it to the genus Selinum as Selinum carvifolia. Linnaeus capitalized the epithet, implying it was meant as a noun in apposition rather than an adjective.

== Distribution and habitat ==
Selinum carvifolia is native to Europe and eastwards to West Siberia and Kazakhstan.

In the UK, this lowland, perennial herb occurs in fens, damp meadows and rough-grazed marshy pasture on calcareous peaty soils or fen peat overlying chalk. It does not, however, grow on the wettest ground in fens, preferring slightly better-drained fringe areas and low banks. In continental Europe, by contrast, it has been recorded in a much wider range of habitats, including oakwoods in Poland, and, curiouser still, hot dry limestone in Bosnia and Croatia.

== Chemistry ==
Selinum carvifolia has been found to contain a guaiene, certain trimethylbenzaldehydes (see also pages aldehyde and benzaldehyde) and minor amounts of other derivatives of the terpenoid (sesquiterpene-coumarin) ferulol. The main constituents of the closely related species S. broteri of Brittany (regarded by some botanists as a subspecies of S. carvifolia) are ferulyl senecioate, isoferulyl senecioate and ferulyl acetoxysenecioate. Trimethylbenzaldehydes occur not only in plants belonging to the Apiaceae, but also in certain members of the Iridaceae: 2,4,6-Trimethylbenzaldehyde occurs in a variety of herbs and spices including Culantro (the leaves of the apiaceous Eryngium foetidum) and in Saffron (derived from the iridaceous Crocus sativus). The compound ferulol was first isolated from (and thus named for) the apiaceous genus Ferula in the year 2006 - the species in question being the Palestinian F. sinaica.

== Edibility/toxicity ==
As its common name in English suggests, Selinum carvifolia has a somewhat parsley-like scent if crushed, although unlike Caraway (from which its specific name derives) it is not a highly aromatic Umbellifer. Records of its having been used as a food, seasoning or medicinal plant are hard to come by, but neither is it listed as a poisonous plant.
