= Segaki =

Japanese Buddhist ritual

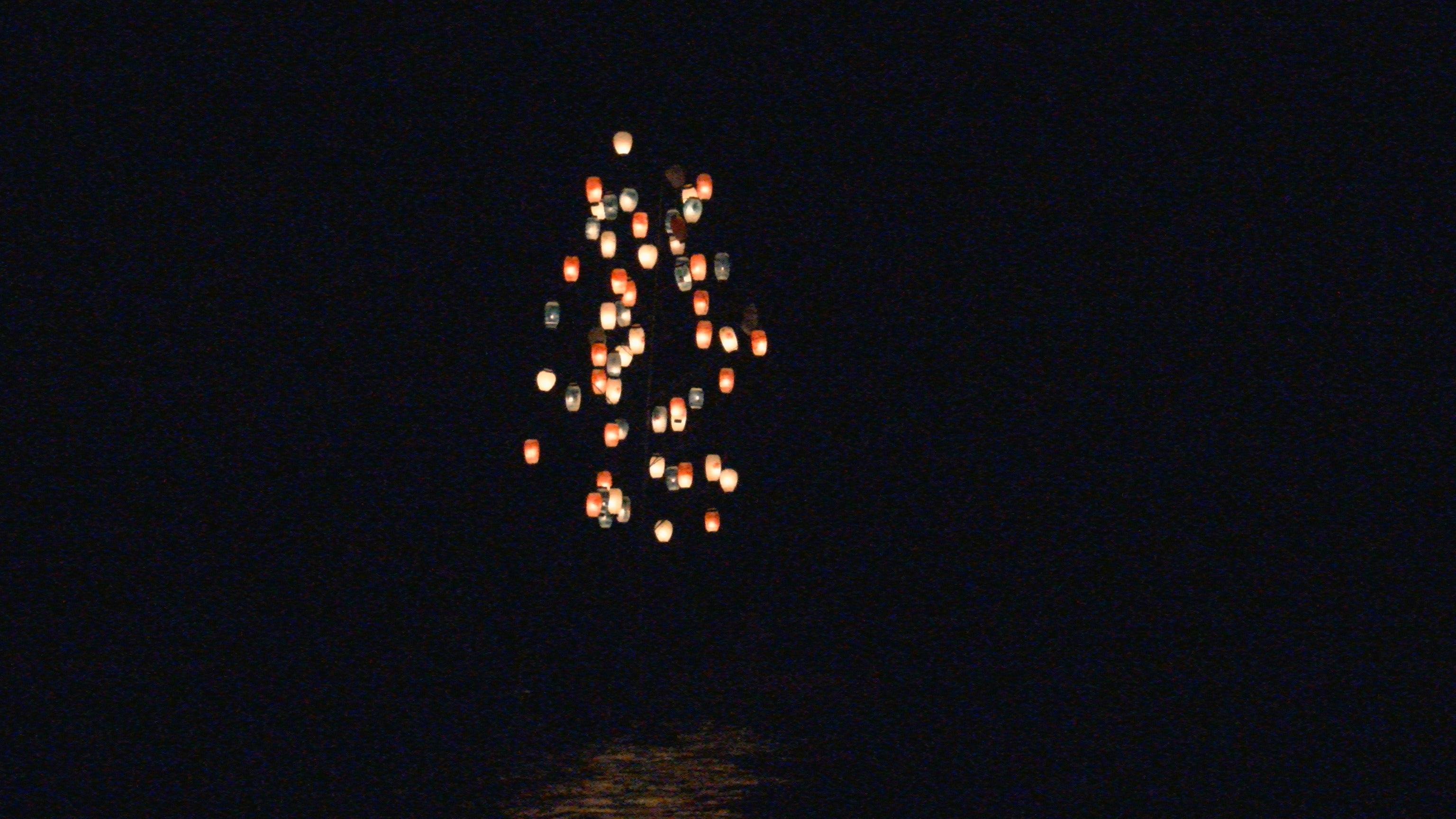
Segaki Boat (Otoyo Town, Kochi Prefecture)

The segaki (施餓鬼; "feeding the hungry ghosts") is a Japanese Buddhist ritual, traditionally performed to stop the suffering of the such restless ghosts/monsters as Gaki (餓鬼, lit. "Hungry Ghosts"), Jikininki (食人鬼, lit. "Man-eating Ghost/Oni") and Muenbotoke (無縁仏, lit. "Without Buddha")--the dead who have no living relatives)--all ghosts tormented by an insatiable hunger. Alternatively, the ritual forces them to return to their portion of hell or keeps the spirits of the dead from falling into the realm of the gaki. The segaki may be performed at any time, but traditionally performed as part of the yearly Urabon'e (Sanskrit: उल्लम्बन Ullambana) services in July to remember the dead and the segaki ritual for offering alms to specifically hungry gaki or muenbotoke, not for spirits of one's ancestor.

The ritual is held at Buddhist temples and there is a custom to place segaki-dana (rack for gaki) or gaki-dana (shelf for gaki) at home, present offerings (traditionally rice and water) for hungry ghosts who are wandering in this world as muenbotoke during Urabon'e or O-bon. Various Japanese Buddhist traditions also typically have different segaki rites.

In Chinese Buddhism, there are various rituals that correspond to the Japanese Buddhist segaki rite, such as the mengshan shishi, which is carried out during daily evening liturgical services, as well as the yujia yankou, which is often after or as part of regular temple events and services like the shuilu fahui ceremony. The ritual is known as mataka dānēs or matakadānaya in Sri Lankan Buddhism.

== Origins ==
Segaki rites have precedents in several Mahayana sutras regarding rituals performed for the salvation of gaki. According to the Yulanpen Sutra, Maudgalyayana, who was one of the Buddha's principal disciples, once used his powers to search for his deceased parents and discovered that his deceased mother was reborn into the gaki realm. She was in a wasted condition and Maudgalyayana tried to help her by giving her a bowl of rice. Unfortunately as a gaki, she was unable to eat the rice as it was transformed into burning coal. Maudgalyayana then asked Śākyamuni Buddha to help him, whereupon Buddha explains how one is able to assist one's current parents and deceased parents in this life and in one's past seven lives by willingly offering food to the sangha or monastic community during Pravarana (the end of the monsoon season or vassa), which usually occurs on the 15th day of the seventh month whereby the monastic community transfers the merits to the deceased parents, etc..

Account to another sutra that had variously been translated as the Sutra on the Dharani for Saving the Flaming-Mouthed Hungry Ghosts" (佛說救拔焰口餓鬼陀羅尼經) by Amoghavajra and the Sutra on the Dharani and Divine Mantra for Saving the Flaming-Faced Hungry Ghosts (救面燃餓鬼陀羅尼神咒經) by Śikṣānanda (實叉難陀) during the Tang dynasty, Ananda, another of the Buddha's principal disciples, was practicing meditation in a forest when he suddenly encountered a terrifying gaki king. This gaki king was emaciated, with flames burning fiercely across its face, and it appeared to be in extreme agony. The gaki king introduced itself as either Mennen (面燃, lit: "Burning Mouth") or Enku (燄口, lit: "Flaming Mouth"), and warned Ananda that he would fall into the gaki realm (餓鬼道) in three days. To avoid this fate, Ananda was instructed to make offerings to hundreds of thousands of gaki and Brahmin sages, providing each with a measure of food, and to make offerings to the Three Jewels (三寶, the Buddha, Dharma, and Sangha). The encounter prompted Ānanda to beg Śākyamuni Buddha for a way to avert his fate, at which point the Buddha revealed a ritual and dhāraṇī that he had been taught in a past life when he was a brahmin by the Bodhisattva Kannon. According to the sūtra, the performance of the ritual would not only feed the hungry ghosts but would also ensure the longevity of the performing ritualist. Through the power of the dharani (a sacred mantra), the offered food was transformed into a spiritual offering. This offering was dedicated to the Three Jewels and equally distributed to hungry ghosts and other beings. This act could alleviate the suffering of the ghosts, enabling them to abandon their ghostly forms and be reborn in the heavenly realm. Following the Buddha's instructions, Ananda organized a vegetarian feast to offer to the monastic community, and prayed for blessings, thereby attaining liberation.

== See also ==
- Dharma name
- Exorcism
- Ghost Festival
- Obon
- Yujia Yankou
