= Hungry ghost =

Chinese, Japanese and Tibetan conception of the preta of Buddhist mythology

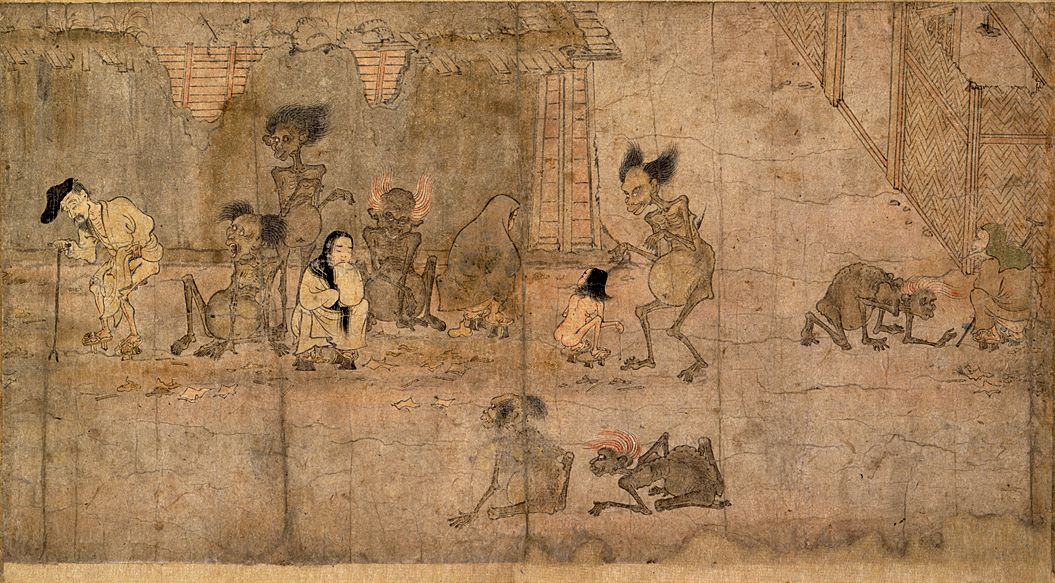
- Gaki zōshi 餓鬼草紙 "Scroll of Hungry Ghosts", circa 12th century

Creature information
- Grouping: Legendary creature
- Sub grouping: Nocturnal, revenant
- Similar entities: Krasue and Kalag
- Folklore: Chinese Buddhism, Japanese Buddhism, Chinese traditional religion

Origin
- Country: China, Japan
- Region: East Asia, South Asia, Southeast Asia

A hungry ghost in Buddhism and Chinese traditional religion is a being who is driven by intense emotional needs in an animalistic way. The Chinese name 餓鬼; èguǐ; 'hungry ghost' translates the Sanskrit preta in Buddhism. Hungry ghosts play a role in Chinese Buddhism, Japanese Buddhism, Taoism, and in Chinese folk religion. Hungry ghosts are distinct from generic ghosts or damnation, 鬼; guǐ (the residual spirit of a deceased ancestor). The understanding is that people first become a regular ghost when they die and then slowly weaken and eventually die a second time. The hungry ghosts, along with animals and hell beings, consists of the three realms of existence no one desires. In these realms it is extremely difficult to be reborn in a better realm (i.e. the realm of humans, asura or deva) because it is nearly impossible to perform deeds that cultivate good karma.

With the rise in popularity of Buddhism, the idea that souls would live in space until reincarnation became popular. In the Taoist tradition, hungry ghosts can arise from people whose deaths have been violent or unhappy. Buddhism and Taoism share the idea that hungry ghosts can emerge from neglect or desertion of ancestors. According to the Huayen Sutra, evil deeds will cause a soul to be reborn in one of six different realms. The highest degree of evil deed will cause a soul to be reborn as a denizen of hell, a lower degree of evil will cause a soul to be reborn as an animal, and the lowest degree will cause a soul to be reborn as a hungry ghost. According to the tradition, evil deeds that lead to becoming a hungry ghost are killing, stealing and sexual misconduct. Desire, greed, anger and ignorance are all factors in causing a soul to be reborn as a hungry ghost because they are motives for people to perform evil deeds. The biggest factor is greed as hungry ghosts are ever discontent and anguished because they are unable to satisfy their feelings of greed.

Some traditions imagine hungry ghosts living inside the bowels of earth or they live in the midst of humans but go unnoticed by those around them or they choose to distance themselves.

== Myths of origin ==
There are many legends regarding the origin of hungry ghosts. It is likely that the idea of hungry ghosts originated from ancient Indian culture, where they were referred to as Preta.

In the Buddhist tradition, hungry ghosts appear in stories from the Chuan-chi po-yuan ching ("Sutra of One Hundred Selected Legends") from the early third century. Some examples of these stories are as follows:

Once, a rich man who travelled was selling sugar-cane juice. One day, a monk came to his house in search of some juice to cure an illness. The man had to leave, so he instructed his wife to give the monk the drink in his absence. Instead of doing this, she secretly urinated in the monk's bowl, added sugar cane juice to it and gave it to the monk. The monk was not deceived; he poured out the bowl and left. When the wife died, she was reborn as a hungry ghost.

Another such tale is of a man who was giving and kind. One day, he was about to leave his house when a monk came by begging. The man instructed his wife to give the monk some food. After the man left his house, his wife was overcome with greed. She took it upon herself to teach the monk a lesson, so she locked the monk in an empty room all day with no food. She was reborn as a hungry ghost for innumerable lifetimes.

The legends often speak of hungry ghosts who, in a previous lifetime, were greedy women who refused to give away food. Other stories in the Buddhist tradition come from the "Sutra on Ghosts Questioning Maudgalyāyana" (鬼問目連經; Gui wen Mulian jing). One of the stories tells of a diviner who constantly misled people due to his own avarice, and thus, he was reborn as a hungry ghost. Another story in "The Legend of Mu-lien Entering the City and Seeing Five Hundred Hungry Ghosts" is about five hundred men that were sons of elders of the city they lived in. When monks came begging to the city for food, the sons denied them because they thought the monks would keep coming back and eventually take all their food. After the sons died, they were reborn as hungry ghosts.

=== Avadānaśataka "One Hundred Stories" ===
The Avadānaśataka is one of the earliest collections of stories about hungry ghosts and was compiled by a Buddhist monk from northwest India between the second and fourth centuries CE. The stories in this work may have functioned as a prescription for appropriate behaviour. The text is divided into ten "decades", the fifth decade being stories that concern hungry ghosts. This part of the Avadānaśataka recounts the bad thoughts and behavior the hungry ghosts have cultivated in their human existence which led them to the hungry ghost realm. The accumulation of malignancy or meanness is called mātsarya.

The notion of mātsarya in this volume is explained to understand the logic of mātsarya's development, the actions it evokes, the suffering it causes and in which ways it can be eradicated. Therefore, it describes the causal chain (pratītyasamutpāda) that leads to the existence of a hungry ghost. At the end of nearly every story the phrase "Work hard to get rid of your mātsarya!" is repeated.

== In China ==
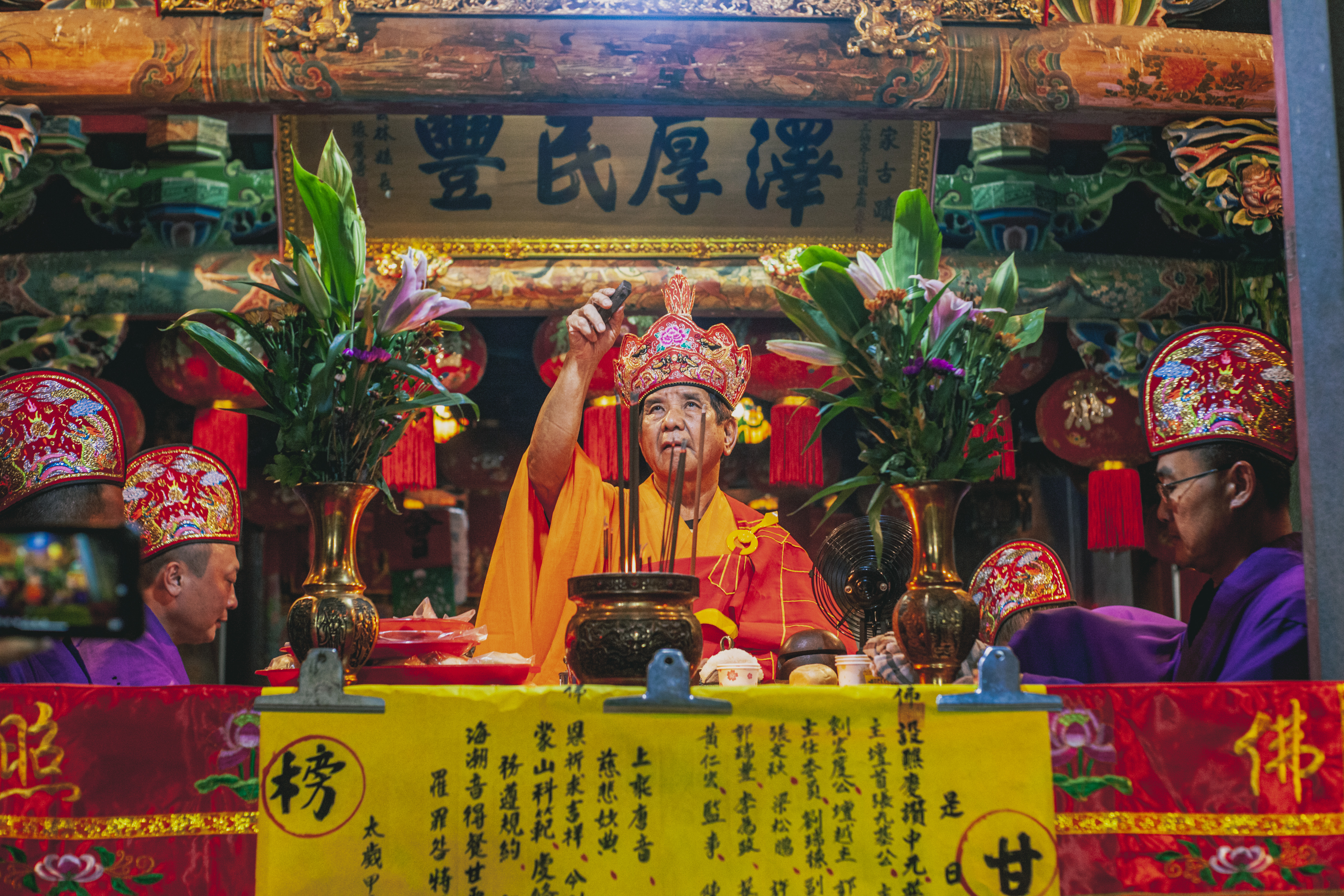
A Chinese Buddhist monk and his attendants performing the Yujia Yankou ritual, a rite that fulfils several different functions, including feeding hungry ghosts.

In China, Taiwan and other overseas Chinese communities, preta is translated as egui (Chinese: 餓鬼, lit: "hungry ghost"), which descends from the Middle Chinese pronunciation of nga^{H} kjwɨj^{X}. In Chinese Buddhism, the egui dao (餓鬼道, lit: "Path of the Hungry Ghosts") is one of the six domains of the desire realm of Buddhism. Many Chinese Buddhist rituals performed throughout the year typically contain sections where the various types of egui and spirits are summoned and provided nourishment in the form of food offerings and Buddhist teachings and precepts. The oral tradition of Chinese ancestral worship believes that the ghosts of the ancestors may be granted permission to return to the world of the living at a certain time of the year. If the spirits are hungry and not given sufficient offerings by their living relatives, they take what they can from the world.

=== Yulanpen Festival ===
A festival called the Yulanpen Festival (simplified Chinese: 盂兰盆; traditional Chinese: 盂蘭盆; pinyin: Yúlánpén; lit. 'Ullambana') is held to honor the egui and food and drink is put out to satisfy their needs. The festival is celebrated during the seventh month of the Chinese calendar. It also falls at the same time as a full moon, the new season, the fall harvest, the peak of monastic asceticism, the rebirth of ancestors, and the assembly of the local community. According to tradition, during this month, the gates of Diyu (hell) are opened up and the egui are free to roam the earth where they seek food and entertainment. These egui are believed to be ancestors of those who have forgotten to pay tribute to them after they died. They have long thin necks because they have not been fed by their families. Tradition states that families should offer prayers to their deceased relatives and burn "hell money". It is believed that "hell money" is a valid currency in the underworld and helps ghosts to live comfortably in the afterlife. People also burn other forms of joss paper such as paper houses, cars and televisions to please the ghosts.

Families also pay tribute to other unknown wandering egui so that these homeless souls do not intrude on their lives and bring misfortune. A big feast is held for the egui on the 15th day of the seventh month, where people bring samples of food and place them on the offering table to please the egui and ward off bad luck. Live shows are also put on and everyone is invited to attend. The first row of seats is always empty as this is where the ghosts are supposed to sit to better enjoy the live entertainment. The shows are always put on at night and at high volumes, so that the sound attracts and pleases the egui. These acts were better known as "Merry-making".

=== Chinese Buddhist practices ===
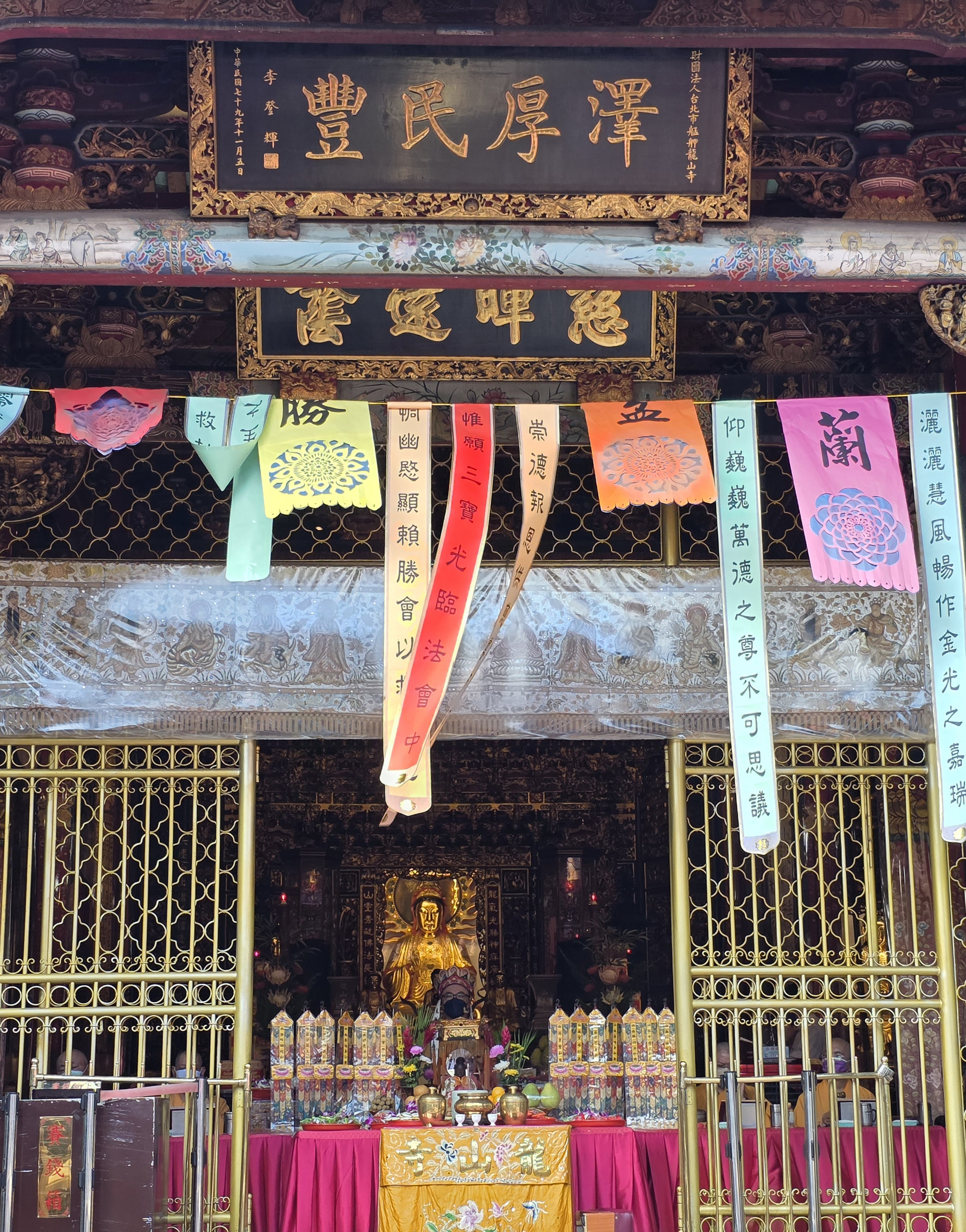
Yujia Yankou ritual at Bangka Lungshan Temple during the Yulanpen Festival.

Chinese Buddhist rituals that feature the feeding of egui are commonly performed as part of regular temple services. A key example is the Mengshan Shishi rite (蒙山施食, Méngshān Shīshí, lit: "Mengshan food bestowal"), which is commonly performed as part of the daily evening liturgy in most Chinese Buddhist temples.

Another key rite that is often performed is the Yujia Yankou ritual (Chinese: 瑜伽燄口, pinyin: Yújiā Yànkǒu, lit: "Yoga Flaming-Mouth Food Bestowal"), also known as the Yuqie Yankou ritual. It is commonly performed during or at the end of regular religious temple events such as repentance rites (Chinese: 懺悔, pinyin: Chànhǔi), Buddha recitation retreats (Chinese: 佛七, pinyin: Fóqī), the dedication of a new monastic complex, gatherings for the transmission of monastic vows or the Yulanpen Festival. During the ritual, one or more monks execute various esoteric and tantric practices, including maṇḍala offerings, recitation of esoteric mantras, execution of mudrās and visualization practices to deliver both physical nourishment (in the form of food offerings) as well as spiritual nourishment (in the form of Buddhist teachings and conferment of precepts) on egui and other hell-beings. The ritual also combines features of Chinese operatic tradition (including a wide range of instrumental music as well as vocal performances such as solo deliveries, antiphonal and choral singing) as well as the recitation of sūtras similar to other exoteric Mahāyāna rituals. The ritual is typically open for attendance to the public, and especially lay people, who participate as the audience and spectators.

During the ritual, various Buddhist figures such as the Five Tathāgatas, Guanyin, Zhunti and Dizang are invoked to help empower the ritual space and offerings as well as other ritual functions. Another key figure in the ritual is the egui king Mianran Dashi (Chinese: 面燃大士, pinyin: Miànrán Dàshì, lit: "Burning-Face Mahāsattva"), who is commonly regarded as a manifestation of the Bodhisattva Guanyin and who features prominently in the sūtra upon which the ritual was based on. During the climax of the ritual, the main performers of the rite toss the offerings into the ritual space before the main altar for the spirits, as well as to the audience of the rite. Only vegetarian food offerings are allowed as Buddhist precepts promote compassion for all sentient beings and forbid the taking of any life. The Buddhist refuge vows as well as precepts are also conferred upon the spirits present at the ritual, and all merits generated from the rite are usually dedicated to all sentient beings at the end of the rite.

=== Taoist practices ===
The chief Taoist priest of the town wears an ornate crown of five gold and red panels, a practice appropriated from Chinese Buddhism. This represented the five most powerful deities (The Jade Emperor, Lord Guan, Tu Di Gong, Mazu and Xi Wangmu) according to Taoist beliefs. He is believed to become their voice on earth. A sacrificial altar and a chair are built for a priest either at a street entrance or in front of the village. The Bodhisattva Dizang sits in front of the chair. Under the chair are plates of rice flour and peaches. Sitting on the altar are three spirit tablets and three funeral banners. After noon, sheep, pigs, chicken, fruits, and cakes are donated by families that are displayed on the altar. A priest will put a triangular paper banner of three colors with special characters on every sacrifice. After the music begins to play, the priest hits the bell to call the egui back to the table. He then throws the rice and peaches into the air in all directions to distribute them to the egui. During the evening, incense is burnt in front of the doors of households. Incense stands for prosperity, the more incense burnt, the greater one's prosperity. During the festival, shops are closed to leave the streets open for the ghosts. In the middle of each street stands an altar of incense with fresh fruit and sacrifices displayed on it. Behind the altar, monks will sing songs that it is believed only the ghosts can understand. This rite is called shi ge'r, meaning "singing ghost songs". Fifteen days after the feast, to make sure all the hungry ghosts find their way back to hell, people float lanterns on water and set them outside their houses. These lanterns are made by setting a lotus flower-shaped lantern on a piece of board. Egui are believed to have found their way back when the lanterns go out.

=== Other beliefs ===
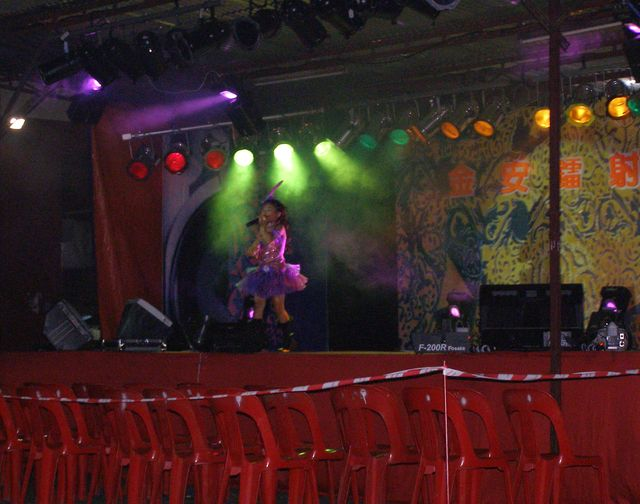
A performance held during Ghost month in Kuala Lumpur, Malaysia. People are not supposed to sit in the red chairs at the front because they are reserved for the "hungry ghosts."

There are many folk beliefs and taboos surrounding the Yulanpen Festival. Spirits are thought to be dangerous, and can take many forms, including snakes, moths, birds, foxes, wolves, and tigers. Some can even use the guise of a beautiful man or woman to seduce and possess. One story refers to a ghost which takes the form of a pretty girl and seduces a young man until a priest intervenes and sends the spirit back to hell. It is believed that possession can cause illness and/or mental disorders.

During the seventh month of the Chinese calendar, children are advised (usually by an elder in the family) to be home before dark, and not to wander the streets at night for fear a ghost might possess them. Swimming is thought to be dangerous as well, as spirits are believed to have drowned people. People will generally avoid driving at night, for fear of a "collision", or spiritual offence, which is any event leading to illness or misfortune. While "ghost" is a commonly used term throughout the year, many people use the phrase "backdoor god" or "good brother" instead during the 7th month, so as not to anger the ghosts. Another thing to avoid is sampling any of the food placed on the offering table, as doing this can result in "mysterious illness". Any person attending a show at indoor entertainment venues (getai) will notice the first row of chairs is left empty. These seats are reserved for the spirits, and it is considered bad form to sit in them. After an offering has been burnt for the spirits, stepping on or near the burnt area should be avoided, as it is considered an "opening" to the spirit world and touching it may cause the person to be possessed.

== In Tibet ==
In Tibetan Buddhism, Hungry Ghosts (Standard Tibetan: ཡི་དྭགས་, Wylie: yi dwags, Sanskrit: preta) have their own realm depicted on the Bhavacakra and are represented as teardrop or paisley-shaped with bloated stomachs and necks too thin to pass food so that attempting to eat is also incredibly painful. Some are described as having "mouths the size of a needle's eye and a stomach the size of a mountain". This is a metaphor for people futilely attempting to fulfill their illusory physical desires.

According to the History of Buddhism, as elements of Chinese Buddhism entered a dialogue with Indian Buddhism in the Tibetan Plateau, this synthesis is evident in the compassion rendered in the form of blessed remains of food, etc., offered to the pretas in rites such as Ganachakra.

In Mahayana Buddhism Chenrezig offers the hungry ghosts the nectar flowing from his fingers that relieves their suffering. This buddha helps the hungry ghosts as he is the manifestation of the Lotus Family that has the special ability to support those who suffer, in this case the hungry ghost realm that is filled with suffering. This nectar symbolises purification which is able to cleanse all negativities, karma, obscurations, and defilements.

== In Japan ==
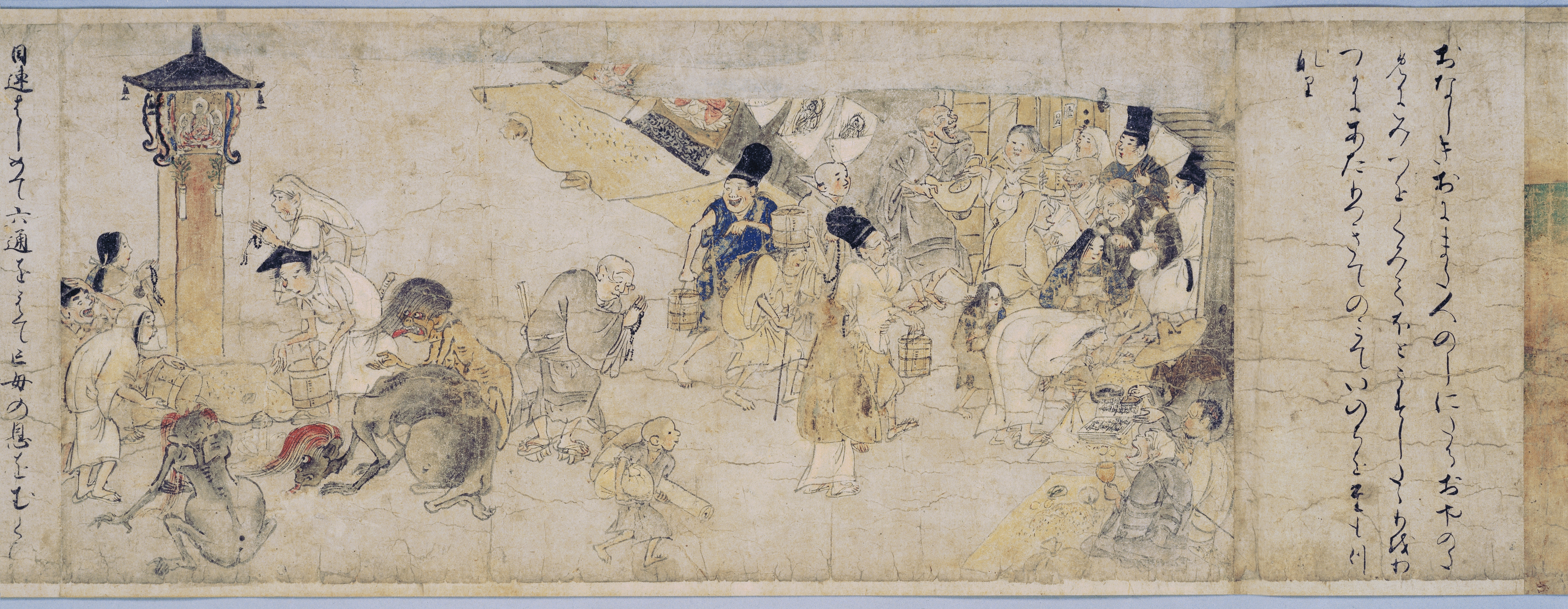
Image from a Japanese scroll which describes the realm of the hungry ghosts and how to placate them. Currently housed at the Kyoto National Museum, artist unknown.

Section of the Hungry Ghosts Scroll depicting one of the thirty-six types of hungry ghosts who constantly seeks water to drink and explaining how those who have been born as such are saved by the offerings of the living. Kyoto Museum

In Japanese Buddhism, the Hungry Ghosts are considered to have two variants: the gaki and the jikininki. Gaki (餓鬼) are the spirits of jealous or greedy people who, as punishment for their mortal vices, have been cursed with an insatiable hunger for a particular substance or object. Traditionally, this is something repugnant or humiliating, such as human corpses or feces, though in more recent legends, it may be virtually anything, no matter how bizarre. Jikininki (食人鬼 "people-eating ghosts") are the spirits of greedy, selfish or impious individuals who are cursed after death to seek out and eat human corpses. They do this at night, scavenging for newly dead bodies and food offerings left for the dead. They sometimes also loot the corpses they eat for valuables. Nevertheless, jikininki lament their condition and hate their repugnant cravings for dead human flesh. Japanese ghost-feeding rites, known as segaki, are also performed regularly by all Japanese Buddhist traditions.

The Hungry Ghosts Scroll kept at the Kyoto National Museum depicts the world of the hungry ghosts and the suffering of these creatures, and contains tales of salvation of the ghosts. The whole scroll has been designated as National Treasure of Japan and it was possibly part of a set of scrolls depicting the six realms which was kept at Sanjūsangen-dō.

LaFleur comments that these depictions symbolise that hungry ghosts are not just hungry but they are constituted by their very hunger. Unlike mankind's impermanent hunger, for hungry ghosts "there is only an ongoing, alleviated gnawing of the stomach and parching of the throat." The body of the hungry ghost is important as it has a huge stomach and a throat as narrow as a needle which leaves the hungry ghost in the dilemma of always having appetite but no way to ever satisfy that hunger. The hungry ghost depicted in art in medieval Japan were thought of as "consumer of fires" because they mistook fire for something edible in their constant strive to satisfy their hunger. This only makes their hunger worse, they start to emit fire from their mouths and start to consume even more fire. LaFleur interprets that the art of hungry ghosts might have provided viewers of a look into the world they inhabit and which they normally do not see clearly. Therefore, the images might offer the insights that hungry ghosts interact with the world of humans from their world and that the human realm is oblivious to these beings affecting them.

== Types of spirits ==
It is believed that the soul contains elements of both yin and yang. The yin is the gui, or demon part, and the yang is the shen, or spirit part. When death occurs, the gui should return to earth, and the shen to the grave or family shrine. If a ghost is neglected, it will become a gui. The shen, or ancestral spirit, watches over its descendants, and can bring good fortune if properly worshipped.

Hungry ghosts are different from the ghosts of Chinese which all people are believed to become after death.

According to the Nyāyānusāriṇī, there are three main groups of hungry ghosts, each of which are divided into three sub-groups:

- ghosts of no wealth (無財鬼)
  - torch or flaming mouths (炬口鬼): These ghosts regurgitate fierce flames with mouths of inextinguishable embers. Their bodies are like that of a palmyra tree. This is the karmic result of stinginess.
  - needle mouths (針口鬼): These ghosts have bellies as vast as mountain valleys. Their mouth are like the hole of a needle. Even if they find food or drink, they cannot consume it. Thus they suffer from hunger and thirst.
  - putrid mouths (臭口鬼): These ghosts give off a great decomposing odor from their mouths. They may be found at privies overflowing with filth and fecal matter. They constantly emit a nauseating, evil fumes. Although they find food, they cannot eat it. This fills them with anger and they run about shrieking.
- ghosts of little wealth (少財鬼)
  - needle hair (針毛鬼): These ghosts have bodies made of hair, firm like spears. They are unapproachable. Their insides burn, as a deer shot with a poison arrow. They run about suffering from ulcers. Only small quantities of impure food can allay their hunger.
  - putrid hair (臭毛鬼): These ghosts also have bodies made of hair that smells incredibly foul. Their flesh and bones emit noxious fumes and their bowels are full of grime. They are agitated from poison in their throats and their skin splits when their hair is pulled out. Only small quantities of impure food can allay their hunger.
  - swollen (癭鬼): Large protuberances grow in their throats. They suffer from aches and fever. They smell of pus that gushes forth from their bodies. They fight with each other over food. They consume small bits of pus and blood and can be somewhat satiated.
- ghosts of much wealth (多財鬼)
  - ghosts of sacrifices (希祠鬼): These ghosts live off sacrifices offered by humans. One is reborn here by ethically gathering wealth, but with a stingy heart does not practice generosity. If one is reborn here, their descendants can make offerings to satiate their hunger.
  - ghosts of losses (希棄鬼): These ghosts are always covetous, searching out filth like vomit and feces to eat. In life, they sought out and found enjoyment in both clean and unclean things, and were thus reborn here.
  - ghosts of great power (大勢鬼): includes certain yaksha, rakshasas, kumbhandas and the like who are the powerful rulers of the spirits. They reside in forests, stupas, mountain valleys, and empty palaces. Those with no authoritative power live on all four continents except for Uttarakuru. Those with authoritative power may also be found in the heavens and on two of the five-hundred islands that lie to the west of Jambudvipa. One island holds their castle while the other holds the castle of those ghosts with no authority.

Sixteen hungry ghosts are said to live in hell or in a region of hell. Unlike other hell dwellers, they can leave hell and wander. They look through garbage and human waste on the outskirts of human cities. They are said to be invisible during the daylight hours but visible at night. Some hungry ghosts can only eat corpses, or their food is burnt up in their mouths, sometimes they have a big belly and a neck as thin as a needle (this image is the basic one for hungry ghosts in Asian Buddhism).

According to the Saddharmasmṛtyupasthāna Sūtra, there are thirty-six different types of hungry ghost.

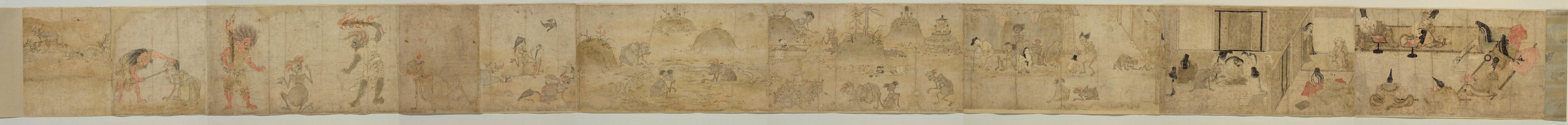
Gaki zōshi

== Interpretation ==
=== Depiction ===
The depictions and stories about hungry ghosts especially in the early Indian context can show the viewer a commentary about the "manual scavengers", members of the lowest caste in India. They are regarded as people whose bad stigma comes from their birth and the group they belong to. They represent a group of starving people who are wandering the outside of cities, are homeless and hungry. As most people have adopted an ingrained blindness to this underclass.

Furthermore, the bodies of hungry ghosts bear similarities with humans who are deprived of food. This malnourishment causes a disorder known as kwashiorkor that encompasses symptoms like stomach bloating from fluid retention, hair and tooth loss and dry and cracked skin. These people have skeletal like figures and big stomachs.

Looking at these hungry ghosts and their figure one might interpret hungry ghosts as teachers. They do not teach the causes of karma like solitary buddhas, however, instead of words with their bodies. Their whole body embodies suffering (dukkha) to such an extent that seeing them gives the viewer the chance to witness the truth of dukkha.

=== The body of the Hungry Ghost as Hell ===
The realm of the hungry ghosts is just one above that of the beings in naraka, however, while the hungry ghosts are not directly in hell their body is constituted by a hunger that they cannot satisfy due to the nature of their bodies, having big bellies and the throat of a needle. Whereas the hell have walls that keep the beings in a permanent state of torture, the body of the hungry ghosts is like a hell because they cannot escape their bodies, free to wander the world at will.

=== In Buddhist philosophy ===
The influential Indian monk Vasubandhu used hungry ghosts in his argumentation of the Yogācāra concept that "everything in the three realms is nothing but appearance." He argues against the objective reality of external objects (physical and non-physical) by asserting that the appearance of external objects is mind-dependent, as they happen to be different at specific times and places across different minds. Since different minds encounter the same objects differently, similar to dreams, these objects do not need to have a physical reality.

The author offers an example about a river perceived as clear by humans, but full of pus by hungry ghosts. Thus, the appearances of external objects across different minds is distinct. By that, the author establishes an argument for a lack of substantial reality among external objects.

== In popular culture ==
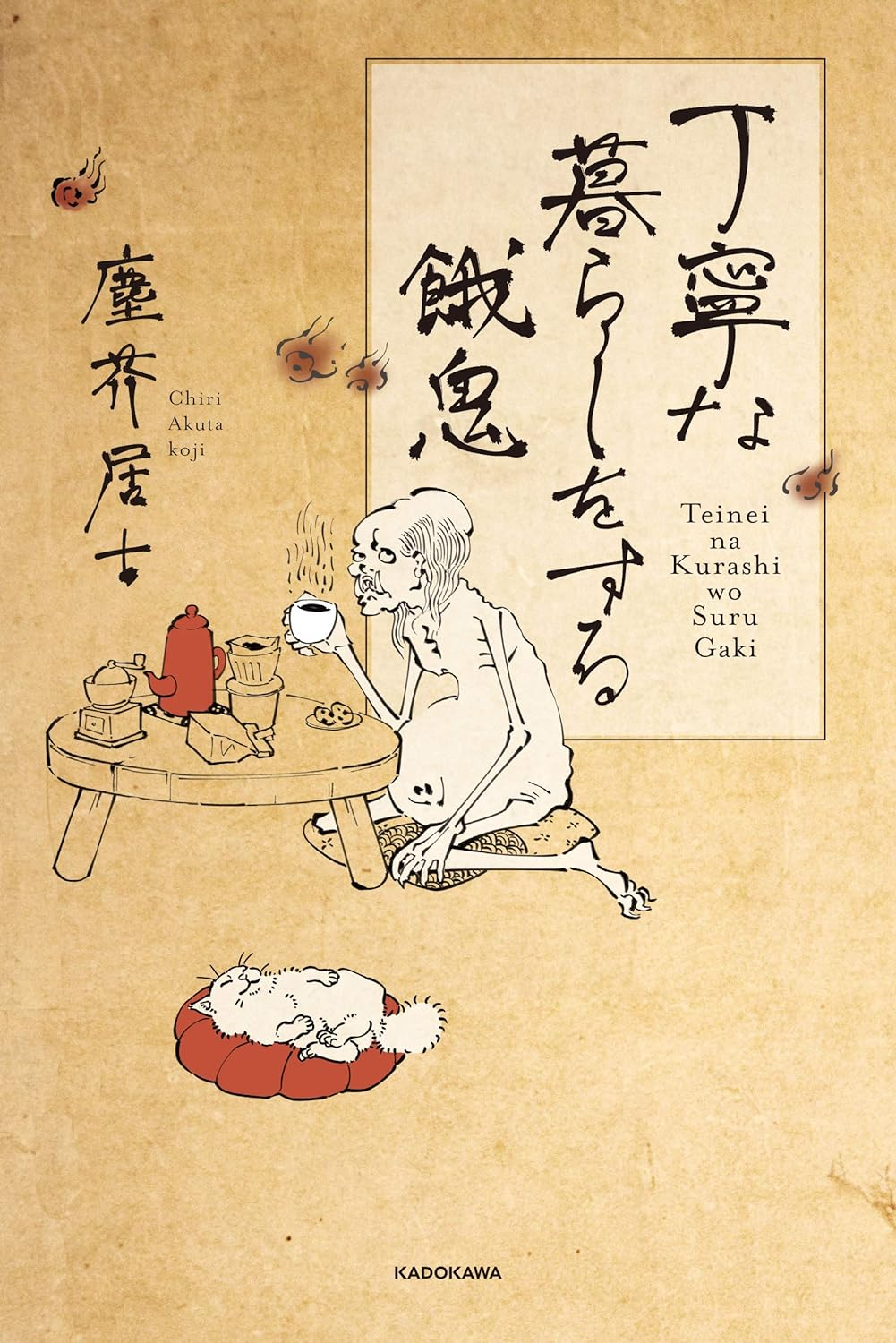
First Volume of Teineina Kurashi wo Suru Gaki

丁寧な暮らしをする餓鬼 ("The Hungry Ghost who leads a polite life"): This three volume work explores the life of a hungry ghost who, unlike others of their kind, is very compassionate and pure-hearted. They spend half a day grinding coffee beans in a mortar, folding plastic bags into triangles, sweeping up leaves, and so on.

The TV series Slip uses the Hungry Ghost as a central theme.

In the TV series Margo's Got Money Troubles, the titular character creates an online persona called the "HungryGhost".

== See also ==
- Buddhist cosmology
- Ghosts in Chinese culture
- Ghosts in Vietnamese culture
- Ghosts in Thai culture
- Obon
- Preta
- Segaki
- Soul dualism
- Vengeful ghost
