= Yaktovil =

Type of protective ritual or exorcism

The yaktovil (Sinhala: යක්තොවිල්) is a ritual documented by anthropologists among Sinhala communities in Sri Lanka. A type of protective ritual or exorcism, the yaktovil invokes the protection of Buddha against malevolent supernatural entities.

== Description ==
The yaktovil is a lengthy, complex ritual that prevents malevolent, supernatural beings from overpowering patients. The ritual brings the patients into the protective manifold of the Buddha.

During the ritual, offering baskets for several yaksha, or nature divinities, are placed on a bench. One of the baskets is devoted to Suniyam. His basket contains, among other things, a sacrificial chicken and an "arrow" of Brahma. The "arrow" in this ritual is a straight branch with one end in the shape of an arrowhead. During the ceremony, it is used to help command and control certain supernaturals. At one point in the ceremony, a person assisting will be "possessed" by the spirit of Suniyam. He will take the sacrificial chicken and stomp around the patient. The yakeduras will use the "arrow" to force his compliance in leaving the patient alone.

=== Yakeduras ===
Yakeduras means "ones who know the art of offering". They are specialists who take control over patient diagnosis and performance of the yaktovil.
