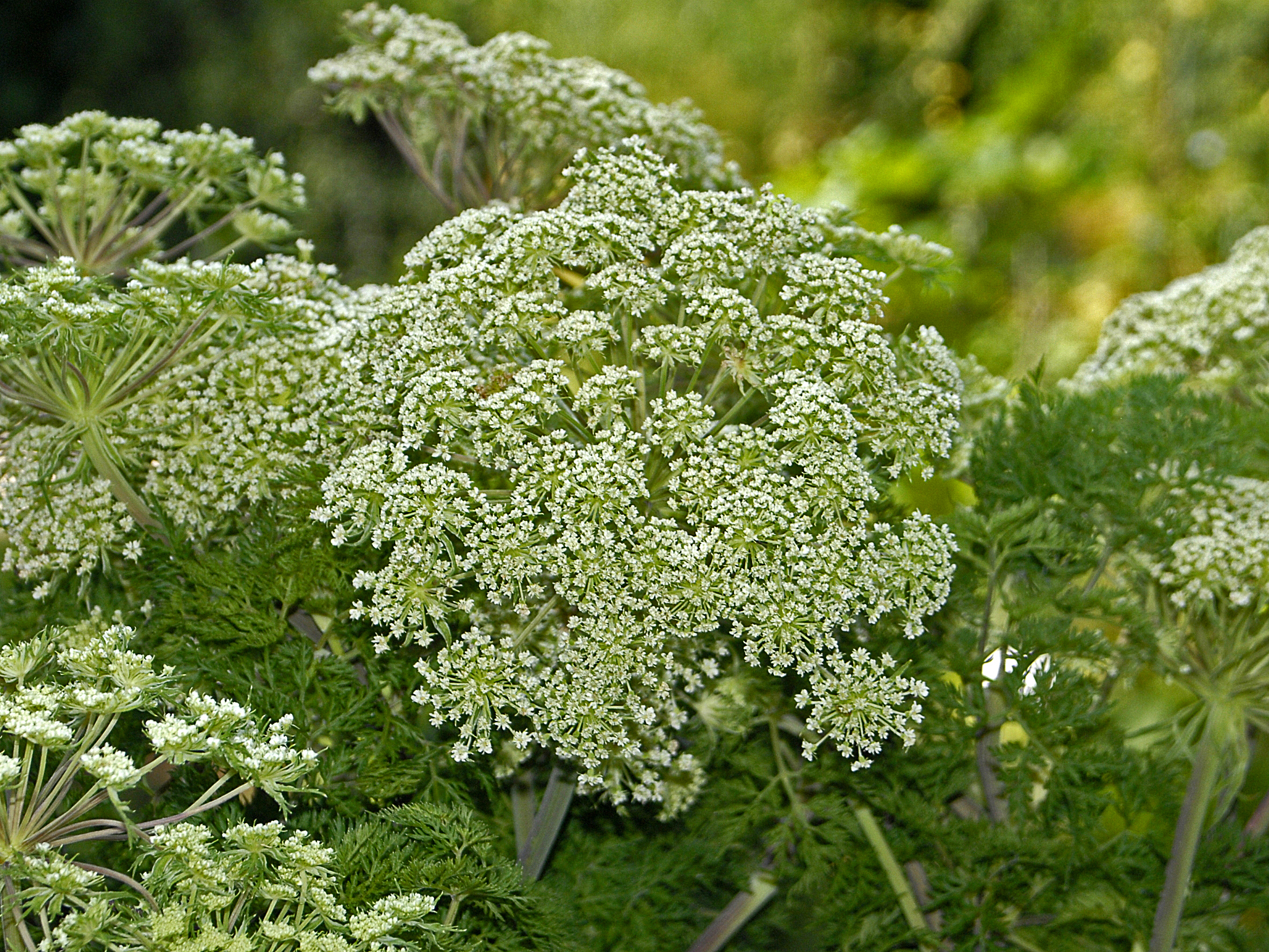
- At the Orto Botanico di Brera, Milano

Scientific classification
- Kingdom: Plantae
- Clade: Tracheophytes
- Clade: Angiosperms
- Clade: Eudicots
- Clade: Asterids
- Order: Apiales
- Family: Apiaceae
- Genus: Ligusticopsis
- Species: L. wallichiana

Binomial name
- Ligusticopsis wallichiana (DC.) Pimenov & Kljuykov

Synonyms
- 17, see text

= Ligusticopsis wallichiana =

Species of plant

Ligusticopsis wallichiana is a species of flowering plant in the family Apiaceae. In cultivation, it has been known by the synonym Selinum wallichianum.

== Common name ==
In its native Himalayas the plant is best known under its Kumaoni name भूतकेशी (bhutkeshi), meaning ghost's hair - in reference to the fibres derived from dead petioles surrounding the top of the rootstock, which are traditionally used to ward off the evil spirits known as bhuts - and it is under this name that the dried root is traded locally.

The English common name Wallich milk parsley is merely a translation of the former Linnaean binomial (scientific name) Selinum wallichianum, which commemorates Danish botanist Nathaniel Wallich.

== Description ==
Ligusticopsis wallichiana can reach a height of 3–6 feet (0.91–1.83 m). It is a long-lived, tuberous-rooted, perennial plant bearing large umbels of thousands of tiny five-petalled white flowers from midsummer to early autumn. The delicate basal leaves are thin (hence one of the former specific names tenuifolium - 'thin-leaved') and finely divided, giving them a fern-like appearance. The plant is grown as a hardy garden ornamental, suitable for informal mixed or shrub borders or woodland gardens, and is effective grown as a specimen plant to display to advantage the tiered effect of its attractive floral umbels.

== Distribution ==
The plant occurs in the Himalayas from India, Nepal, Kashmir and W. Pakistan to Bhutan.

== Habitat ==
Ligusticopsis wallichiana is found in the wild growing among shrubs and also upon open slopes at an elevation of about 13,000 feet (4,000 m).

== Cultivation ==
This plant is cultivated as an ornamental garden subject, and has gained the Royal Horticultural Society's Award of Garden Merit.

== Uses in folk medicine and ritual ==
The plant, like many others belonging to the family Apiaceae, is aromatic - particularly the root. The "seeds" (actually fruits, of the mericarp type) have sedative (see also anxiolytic) and aphrodisiac properties and are also used to treat rheumatism and kidney disease. The roots are used to treat abdominal pain (- many Apiaceous plants possess carminative properties, relieving bloating -) and also as a sedative in the treatment of 'hysteria' and 'madness' - particularly when these conditions occur in women (see also Culture-bound syndrome). The whole plant features in traditional magico-religious beliefs of the Himalayan region, being used to prepare dhoop (incense) for ceremonial use (see also Dhupa). More specifically, the powdered root is used as a fumigant in Tantric rituals intended to cure insanity, nervous breakdown and 'hysteria'. The above uses suggest that preparations of the plant are capable of exerting effects upon the Central nervous system and Genitourinary system and that the plant may be mildly psychoactive, bearing comparison with the related Apiaceous plant Ferula moschata - another umbellifer with a long history of use in India to treat 'hysteria' and as a ritual incense and one which has been observed, on occasion, to elicit narcotic effects. Folk-medicinal uses eliciting psycho-sexual effects further invite comparison with another Ferula species, namely Ferula hermonis, considered, like Ligusticopsis wallichiana, to possess aphrodisiac properties.

== Synonymy ==
The species has acquired many synonyms:

- Cortia wallichiana (DC.) Leute
- Laserpitium coniifolium Wall.
- Ligusticopsis coniifolia (DC.) Pimenov & Kljuykov
- Ligusticum coniifolium DC.
- Ligusticum tenuifolium Franch.
- Oreocome cicutaria (Lindl.) Edgew.
- Oreocome elata Edgew.
- Peucedanum wallichianum DC.
- Pleurospermum cicutarium Lindl.
- Selinum candollei Edgew.
- Selinum cicutarium (Lindl.) Benth. & Hook.f.
- Selinum coniifolium Benth. & Hook.f.
- Selinum elatum (Edgew.) M.Hiroe
- Selinum tenuifolium Wall. ex DC., nom. illeg.
- Selinum wallichianum (DC.) Raizada & H.O.Saxena
- Selinum wallichianum var. elata (C.B.Clarke) Raizada & H.O.Saxena
