= Crithmum =

Conservation status
- Least Concern (IUCN 3.1) (Europe regional assessment)

Scientific classification
- Kingdom: Plantae
- Clade: Tracheophytes
- Clade: Angiosperms
- Clade: Eudicots
- Clade: Asterids
- Order: Apiales
- Family: Apiaceae
- Subfamily: Apioideae
- Tribe: Pyramidoptereae
- Genus: Crithmum; L.
- Species: C. maritimum

Binomial name
- Crithmum maritimum L.

Genus of flowering plant in the carrot family

Crithmum is a monospecific genus of flowering plants in the carrot family, Apiaceae. It currently consists of just one species, Crithmum maritimum, but when it was originally published by Linnaeus (in Species Plantarum vol. 1, p. 246) he included two species. The other, listed as C. pyrenaicum, is now called Libanotis pyrenaica or Seseli libanotis.

Original description of Crithmum from Linnaeus's Species Plantarum. The misspelling of pyrenaicum is a known typographer's error.

Modern accounts usually separate rock samphire into a separate genus. It is distinguished from Seseli (Libanotis) by the yellow (not white) flowers and from Silaum by its fleshy leaves and four (not 0-3) bracts.

Other plants that have been included within the genus include:

- Cenolophium fischeri, Baltic parsley, which was named Crithmum campestre by Anton Johann von Güldenstädt in Bieberstein's Flora Taurico-Caucasica in 1819, but is currently assigned to its own genus.
- Astydamia latifolia, which was listed by Carl Linnaeus the Younger as Crithmum latifolium in 1782.
- Silaum silaus, which was called Crithmum silaus by C.A. Wiebel in 1799.

The name Crithmum pre-dates Linnaeus. It derives from the Ancient Greek word κριθή (krithe), which originally meant "barley", and was used by Dioscorides as the name of a plant ("krithmon") which he described as "a shrubby little herb about a foot in height, with thick leaves, which grows in rocky maritime places..."

Although crithmon may have been the name for rock samphire in Roman times, modern botany uses binomials, so it is known as Crithmum maritimum (which can be abbreviated to C. maritimum) rather than simply Crithmum when writing about the individual species.

== Rock samphire, Crithmum maritimum ==
Crithmum maritimum, commonly known as rock samphire or sea fennel, is native to Europe, north Africa and western Asia, and has been introduced to some other parts of the world. It grows on sandy or shingly beaches, cliffs and artificial sea walls, almost always close to the sea. It is edible and sometimes collected in the wild or cultivated in gardens but is not a commercial crop, unlike marsh samphire, which is an unrelated saltmarsh plant.

Rock samphire on sea cliffs in Beirut, Lebanon

== Description ==
Rock samphire is a perennial herbaceous plant growing to about 30 cm tall with a sprawling growth habit. It has a long yellowish taproot which smells of carrot, and usually several stems arising from the base. Each stem is up to about 50 cm long, typically decumbent (lying flat but turning up towards the tip), greyish-green in colour and sometimes branched. The whole plant is quite glabrous (hairless) and succulent (fleshy), although the base of the stems become woody in the summer.

The leaves are shortly ternate-pinnate, here with five 3-lobed leaflets.

The leaves are arranged alternately along the stems. An individual leaf is up to 15 cm long by about 11 cm wide, and deeply divided into narrow, succulent segments in a twice- or thrice-pinnate structure (ternate or palmate). The individual segments are almost tubular with a flattened pointed tip. The leaf has a long petiole which clasps the stem. The foliage smells of furniture polish and tastes hot and peppery.

The umblets have 8-20 pedicels with 6-8 bracteoles at their base.

Its flowering period is long, sometimes lasting all year in Britain. The inflorescences arise from the leaf axils, with long (up to 5 cm) peduncles, and consist of compound umbels with 8-36 rays. Each umbellule bears between 8 and 20 flowers on short pedicels about 5 mm long. There are 5-10 bracts at the base of the rays and 6-8 bracteoles at the base of the pedicels. All the flowers are monoecious with 5 sepals, 5 petals, 5 stamens and two styles. The petals are white, turning yellow and pink as the flower matures. The fruit is a schizocarp about 5 mm long, with prominent ridges. When mature, this splits into two mericarps, which are typically flung a short distance from the parent plant, leaving the central stalk (the carpophore) standing on the dead flowerheads. These mericarps are spongy and buoyant, allowing them to float for months in seawater.

Close-up of the flowers, showing the inrolled white petals and nectar-covered stylopodium

== Distribution and status ==
Rock samphire occurs on coastlines throughout much of Europe north to the British Isles and southern Scandinavia, Macaronesia, parts of West Asia and North Africa. It is also naturalised some places in the USA, including Monterey Bay in California, and along the coast of New South Wales, where it grows on sand, shingle and rocky cliffs.

Within its range, populations are considered to be stable or often increasing, leading to a status of LC (least concern), although on the edge of its range, as in Bulgaria, it is sometimes considered to be threatened.

== Habitat and ecology ==
Rock samphire is a facultative halophyte which grows in crevices on cliffs, along rocky shorelines, sea defences, on shingle and sometimes on sandy beaches. Its Ellenberg Values in Britain are L=9, F=6, R=7, N=5 and S=5, so it is said to grow in damp places in full sunlight on neutral and moderately fertile substrates within the range of sea spray. The European values are slightly different, most notably indicating that it grows on drier soils, with a value of F=4. This could reflect that fact that it is more often found on sandy beaches in continental Europe.

Rock samphire does not have flowers designed to attract specialist insects, but it is pollinated by a range of flies, bees and beetles. Amongst its parasites are an aphid, Dysaphis crithmi, which lives within the sheathing leaf bases and a bug called Bactericera crithmi which produces galls on the leaves that create a dent on the bottom and a bulge on the top. One flat larva is contained in each cavity.

Rock samphire on a shingle beach, with sea kale and Babington's orache

== Uses ==
In Britain, rock samphire is sometimes cultivated in gardens, where it grows readily in a light, rich soil. The leaves were described by Culpeper as having a "pleasant, hot and spicy taste". Stems and leaves should be washed and cooked, while the stems, leaves and young seed pods can be pickled, perhaps in salted and spiced vinegar. The fresh leaves may be used in salads. Dried and ground sea fennel can also be used as a salt substitute.

Rock samphire in olive oil or vinegar is a traditional food of Italy (Marche region), Croatia (Dalmatia), Greece, and Montenegro (Bay of Kotor). It is known as Paccasassi del Conero and used as an antipasto, to accompany fish and meat dishes and to garnish pizza and sandwiches.

Pa amb Oli with Peperoncini Olives and Sea Fennel

== In culture ==
In the 17th century, Shakespeare in King Lear referred to the dangerous practice of collecting rock samphire from cliffs. In the 19th century, samphire was shipped in casks of seawater from the Isle of Wight to market in London at the end of May each year. Rock samphire used to be cried in London streets as "Crest Marine".

The reclaimed piece of land adjoining Dover, formed from spoil from the Channel Tunnel and called "Samphire Hoe", is named after rock samphire: people formerly harvested rock samphire from the neighbouring cliffs.
