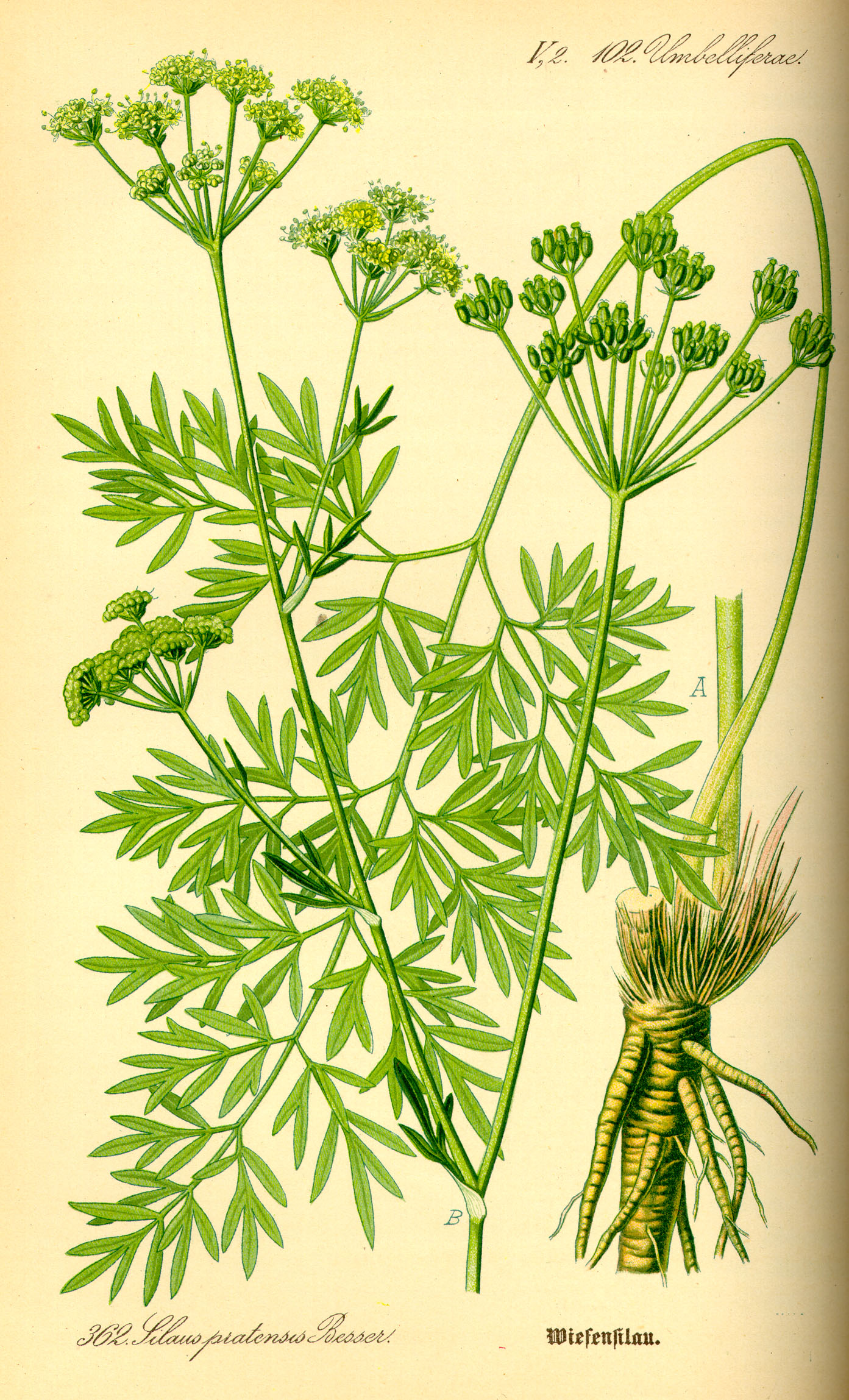

Conservation status
- Least Concern (IUCN 3.1)

Scientific classification
- Kingdom: Plantae
- Clade: Tracheophytes
- Clade: Angiosperms
- Clade: Eudicots
- Clade: Asterids
- Order: Apiales
- Family: Apiaceae
- Genus: Silaum
- Species: S. silaus

Binomial name
- Silaum silaus (L.) Schinz & Thell.

Synonyms
- Peucedanum silaus L. (basionym); Saxifraga anglicana; Seseli pratense Crantz; Silaus flavescens Bernh.; Silaus pratensis (Crantz) Besser; Silaus silaus (L.) H.Karst.

= Silaum silaus =

Species of flowering plant

Silaum silaus, commonly known as pepper-saxifrage, is a perennial plant in the family Apiaceae (Umbelliferae) (the carrot family) found across south-eastern, central, and western Europe, including the British Isles. It grows in damp grasslands on neutral soils.

== Description ==
Silaum silaus is an erect, glabrous umbellifer with woody, stout and cylindrical tap roots, which are hot and aromatic. S. silaus has dark grey or black petioles at the top; petiole remains are found at the bottom of the stem, which is solid and striate. Its umbels are 2–6 cm in diameter, are terminal or axillary, and compound, with 4 to 15 angled rays of 1–3 cm; the peduncle is larger than the rays, and both are papillose. The flowers are mostly hermaphroditic.

Silaum silaus has 2–4-pinnate leaves, which have a triangular and lanceolate outline, a long petiole and the primary divisions are long-stalked. Segments are 10–15 mm long, shaped from lanceolate to linear, the ends are acuminate or obtuse and mucronate, the leaves are finely serrulate, with a prominent midrib; the apex is often reddish in colour. There are 1-pinnate upper cauline leaves present, which are either simple or reduced to a sheath; there is no petiole and the cotyledons are tapered at the base. There are 0–3 bracts and 5–11 bracteoles; the pedicels are linear-lanceolate with scarious margins.

The flowers are yellowish and 1.5 mm across, with absent sepals, and the styles form a stylopodium. The fruits are 4–5 mm in size, oblong-ovoid, and are rarely compressed. The commissure is broad, the mericarps are prominent with slender ridges and lateral forming narrow wings; a carpophore is present. There are numerous vittae, with stout pedicels of 2–3 mm in size, and the stigmas are capitate.

== Taxonomy ==
Silaum silaus was one of the many species described by Carl Linnaeus in volume 1 of the 1753 edition of his Species Plantarum as Peucedanum silaus. It was given its current binomial name in 1915 by Swiss botanists Hans Schinz and Albert Thellung.

The etymology of the genus name Silaum is uncertain, although it may refer to the mountainous plateau La Sila in southern Italy. Another possible explanation is that Silaum may be derived from the yellow ochre, related to the colour of the plant's flowers. Silaus is an old generic name used by Pliny.

Silaum silaus bears the common name pepper-saxifrage (with or without hyphenation) despite being neither a saxifrage nor peppery in taste.

== Distribution and habitat ==
Silaum silaus is found in western, central and south-eastern Europe (including Great Britain), north to the Netherlands and Sweden but is absent from Portugal. In Great Britain, it is found mainly south of the far south of Scotland. The species is listed as an invasive species in Denmark.

Silaum silaus grows in a wide variety of habitats, generally preferring those with damper soils. Specifically, S. silaus can be found in unimproved neutral grassland, railway and road verges and meadows (hay, water and lowland meadows); it is also occasionally found on chalk downs and vegetated shingle.

== Ecology ==
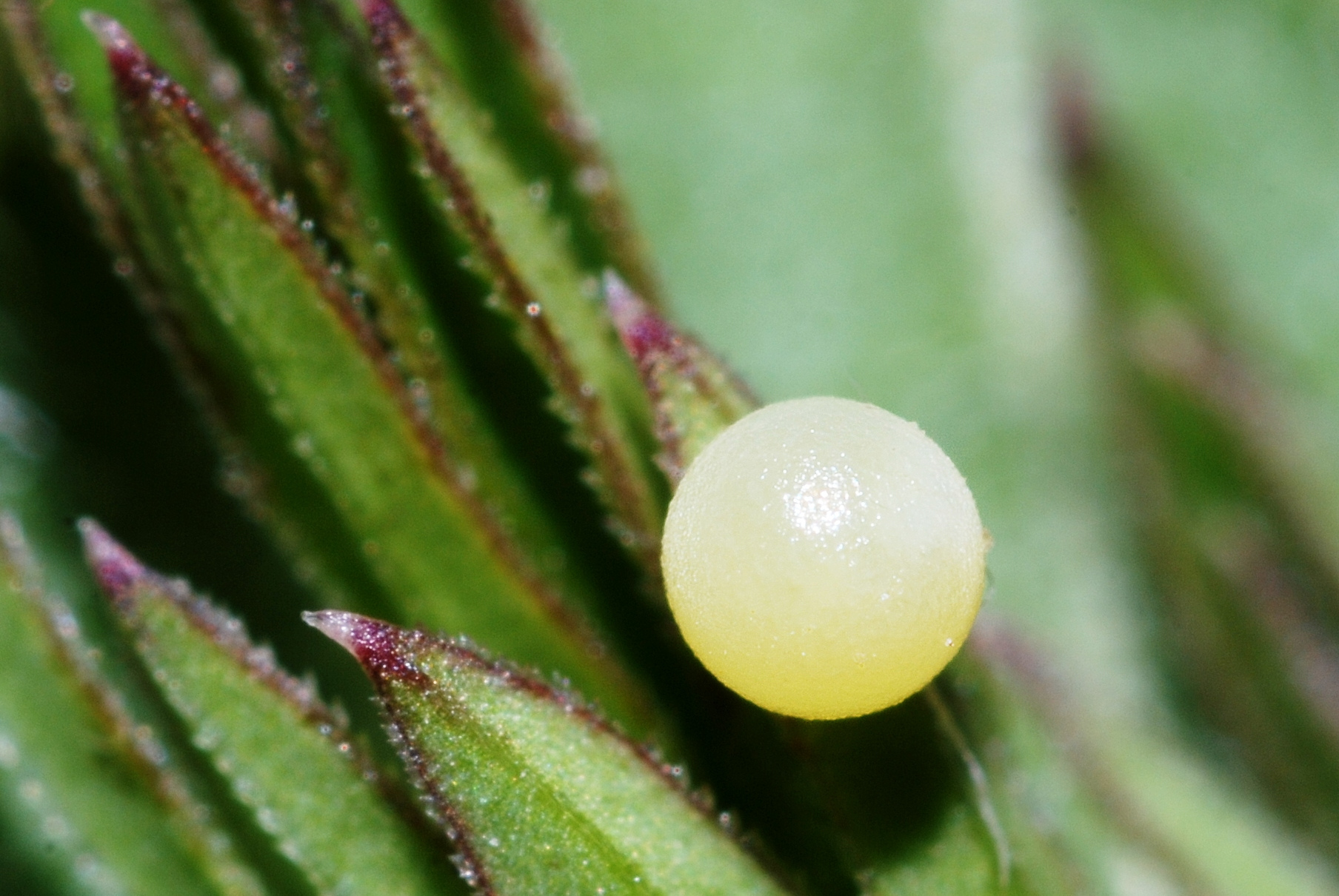
Egg of the butterfly Papilio machaon on a Silaum silaus host plant

Silaum silaus is an indicator of agriculturally unimproved meadows, and is part of a group (in the United Kingdom) of flowering plants specially associated with neutral grassland associated with low-nutrient regimes. This group is declining in the UK due to agricultural improvement, diffuse pollution and habitat fragmentation and hence S. silaus is on the United Kingdom Biodiversity Action Plan. At least three species of moth larvae in the UK use the plant as a food source – Sitochroa palealis, Agonopterix ciliella and Agonopterix yeatiana.

Silaum silaus fruit has been identified from substage III of the Hoxnian interglacial period (a stage in the middle Pleistocene) in the British Isles.

== Uses ==
Silaum silaus is listed in John Parkinson's 1640 work Theatrum Botanicum as being able to soothe "frets" in infants.
