= Praia dos Arrifes =

Beach in Albufeira, Portugal

- Beach
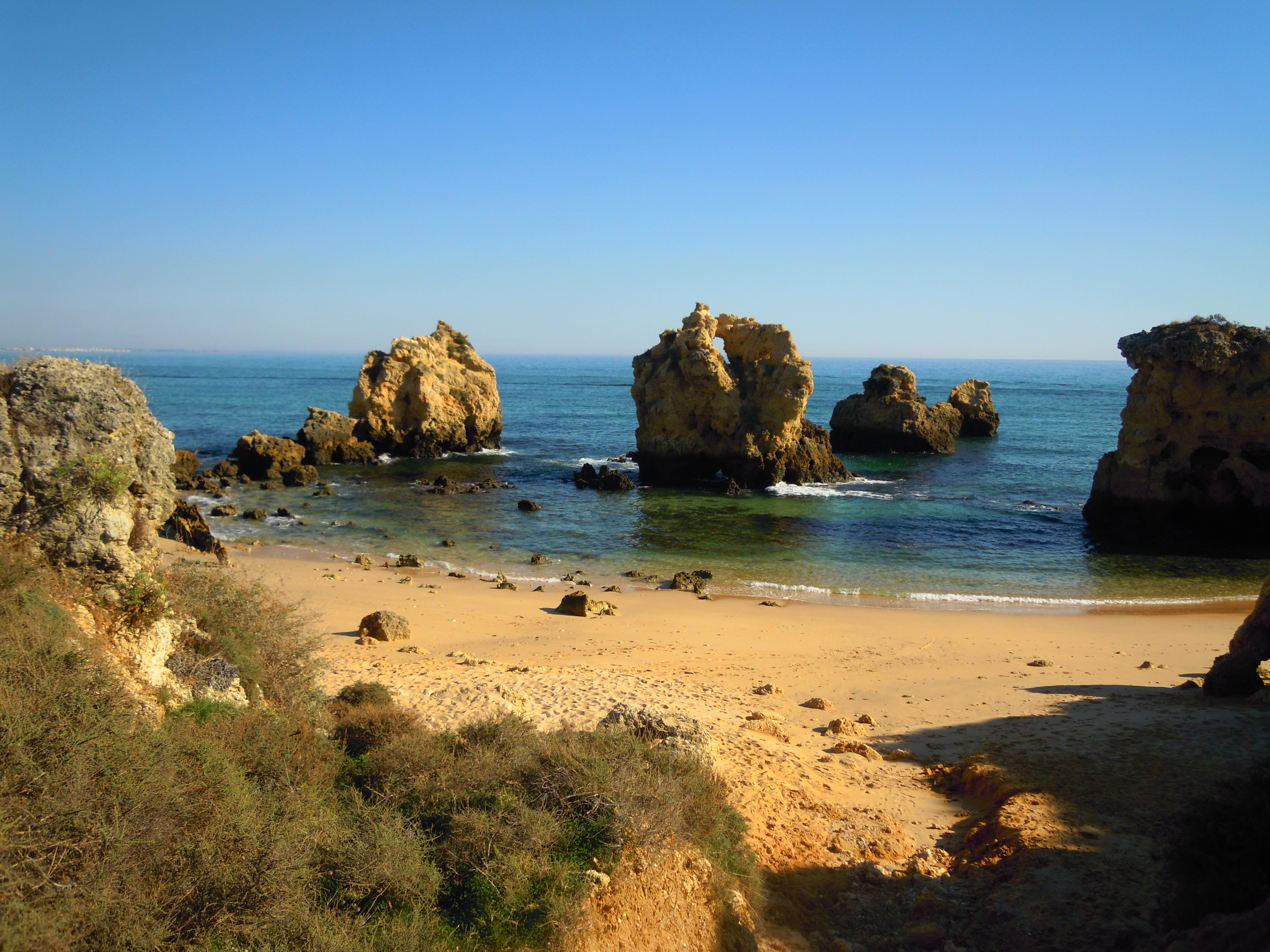
- Praia dos Arrifes

- Location of Praia dos Arrifes
- Coordinates: 37°4′33.80″N 8°16′38.86″W
- Location: Albufeira, Faro District, Portugal

Praia dos Arrifes is a beach on the Atlantic south coast of the Algarve, close to the village resort of Sesmarias which is within the Municipality of Albufeira, Portugal. This beach is located 2.4 miles (3.9 km) by road to the west of Albufeira old town centre and is 29.6 miles (47.6 km) west of the regions capital of Faro. This beach is one of sixty nine blue flag beaches (2012) in the Algarve.

== Description ==
The beach is also sometimes referred to locally as Praia dos Três Penecos (beach of triple rocks). This because of the location of three large isolated rock formations which dominate the line of the horizon from the beach. The tops of the formations are dotted with plants resistant to salt spray, such as Wormleaf Saltwort and Rock Samphire, which survive and grow on the rocks because the tops are well above the high tide level. Above the small beach, the cliff tops are populated by pine trees and examples of the Dwarf Fan Palms, the only palm native to Europe.

=== Access and Facilities ===
To reach the sands there are a set of wooden steps from the parking area making access to this beach difficult for the disabled. The beach facilities include a bar and restaurant although this is closed in the winter. There are toilets and a shower. During the summer season the beach is patrolled by lifeguards. Also in the summer season there are Loungers, and parasols which can be hired. At the back of the beach there is a large informal parking area although in the summer parking is strictly controlled in order to minimise destabilization of the cliffs. Whilst on this beach it is advised to take caution when near the base of the cliffs as there is a danger of falling rocks and stones from above. At the eastern end of the main beach there is a small satellite beach which has difficult access across the rocky foreshore but is characterised with many interesting rock formations and fossilised bedrock.

== Gallery ==
Praia dos Arrifes

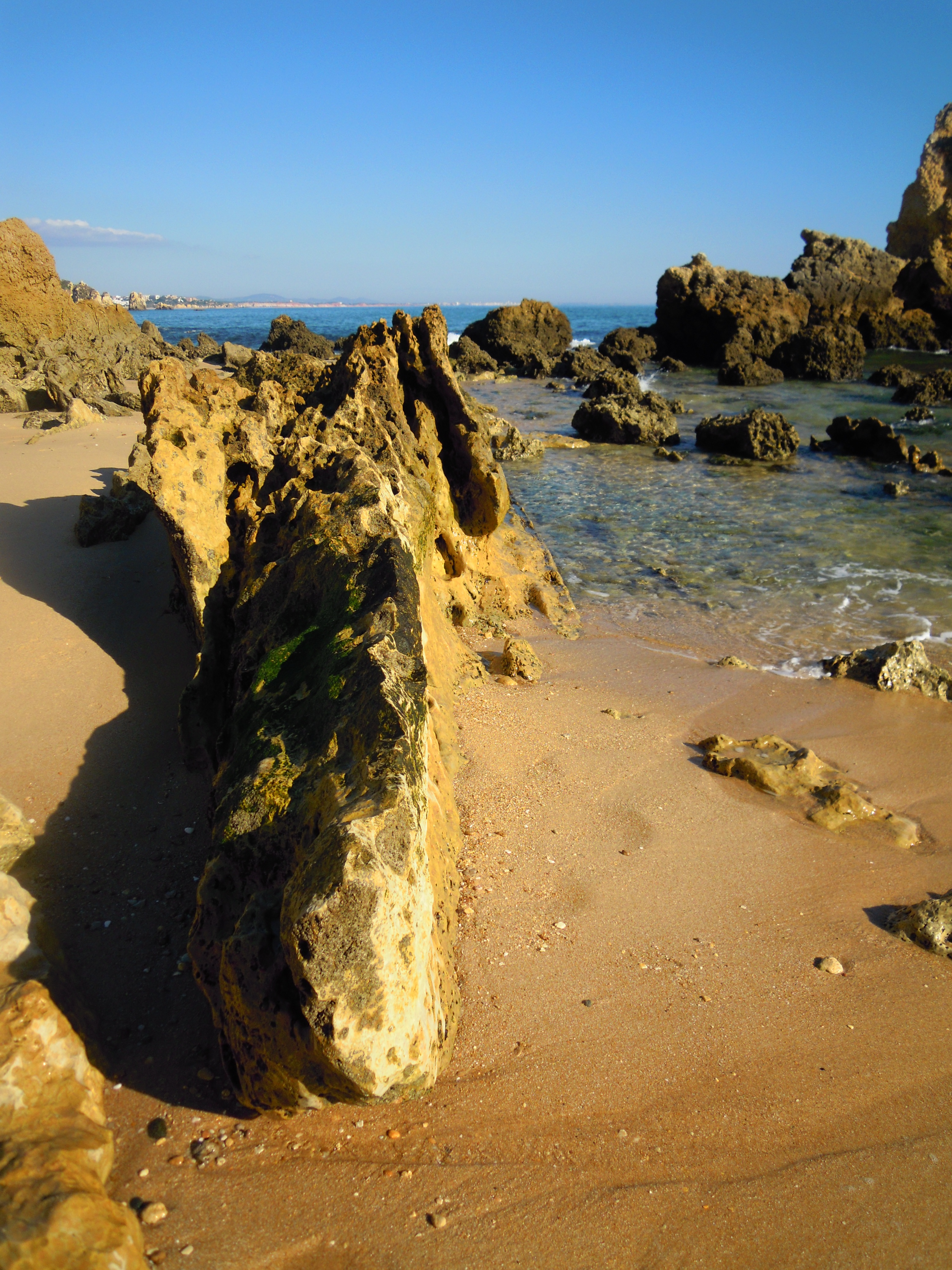
Rock formations on the beach

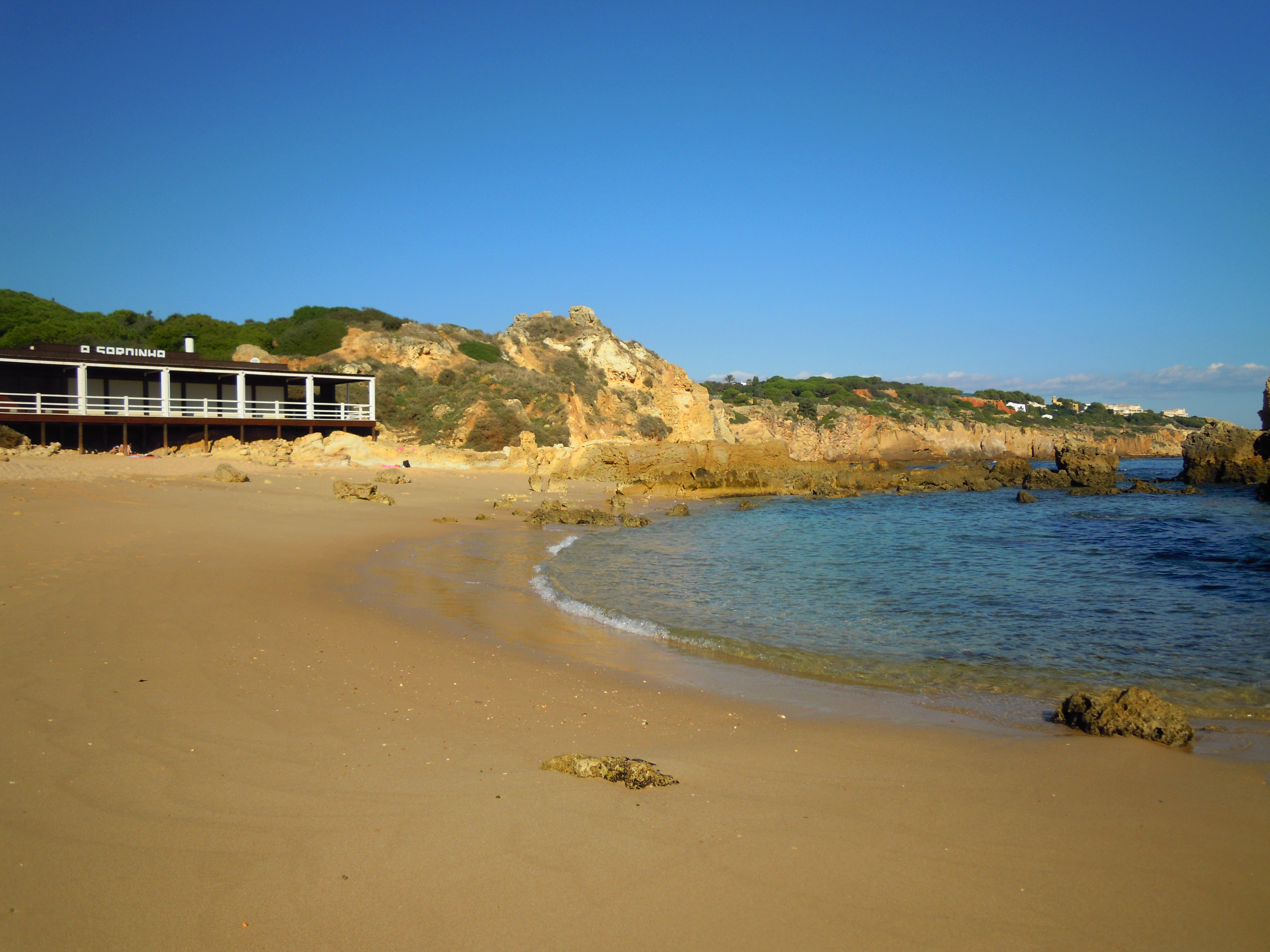
The beach bar and restaurant

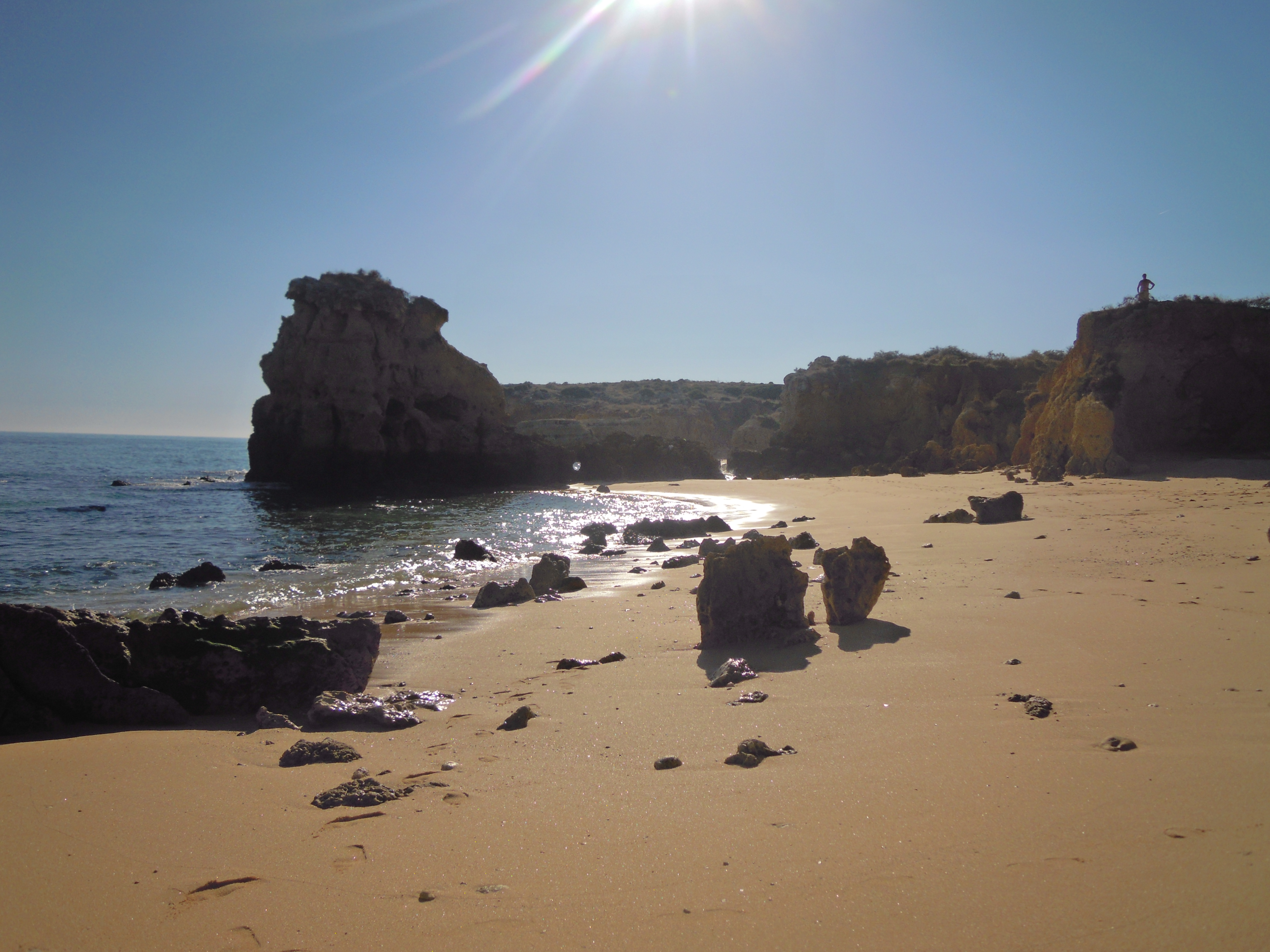
Looking westwards across the beach

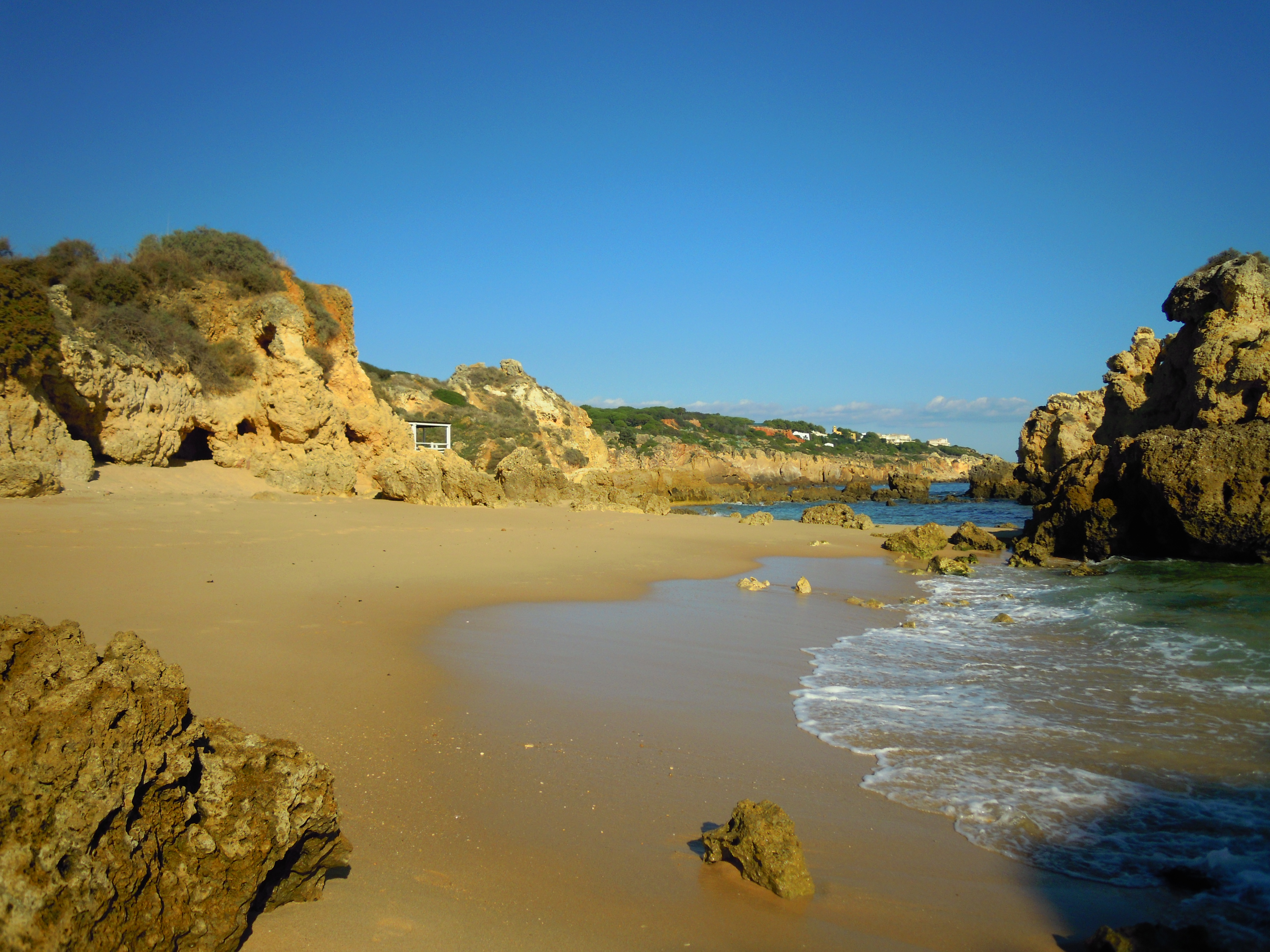
Looking eastwards across the beach

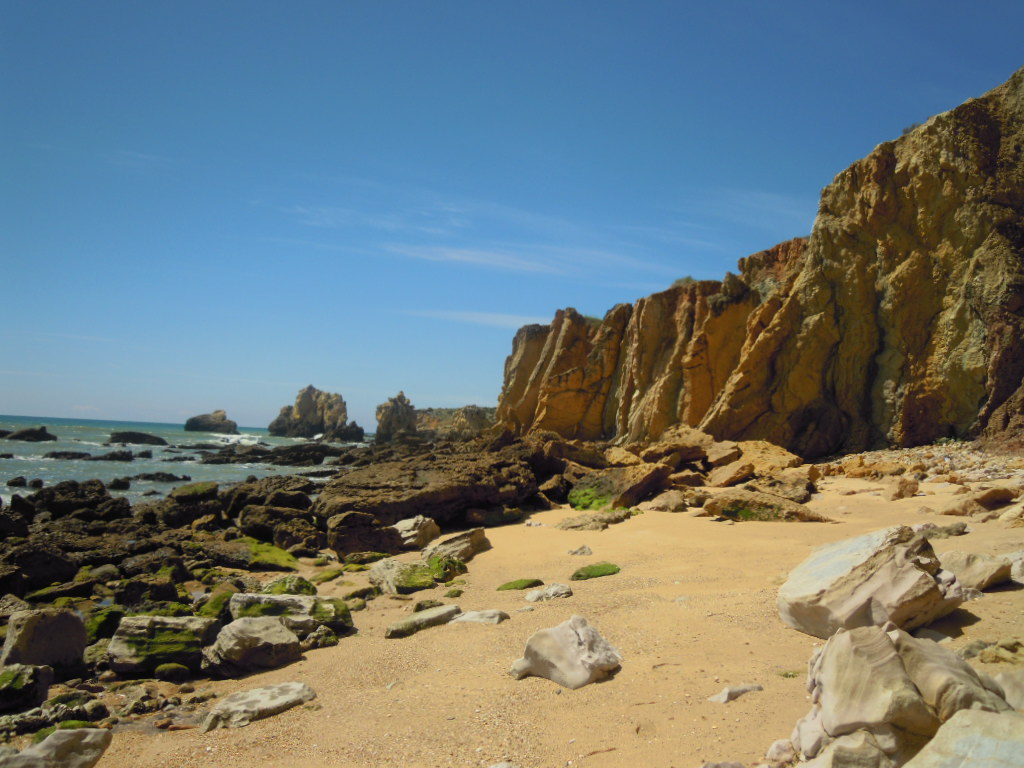
The satellite beach to the east of the main beach
