= Sitochroa straminealis =

Scientific classification
- Kingdom: Animalia
- Phylum: Arthropoda
- Class: Insecta
- Order: Lepidoptera
- Family: Crambidae
- Genus: Sitochroa
- Species: S. straminealis

Binomial name
- Sitochroa straminealis (Hampson, 1900)

Synonyms
- Phlyctaenodes straminealis Hampson, 1900; Loxostege straminealis

Species of moth

Sitochroa straminealis is a moth in the family Crambidae. It was described by George Hampson in 1900. It is found in Turkey.
