= Sitochroa umbrosalis =

Scientific classification
- Domain: Eukaryota
- Kingdom: Animalia
- Phylum: Arthropoda
- Class: Insecta
- Order: Lepidoptera
- Family: Crambidae
- Genus: Sitochroa
- Species: S. umbrosalis

Binomial name
- Sitochroa umbrosalis (Warren, 1892)

Synonyms
- Aplographe umbrosalis Warren, 1892

Species of moth

Sitochroa umbrosalis is a moth in the family Crambidae. It was described by Warren in 1892. It is found in northern China.
