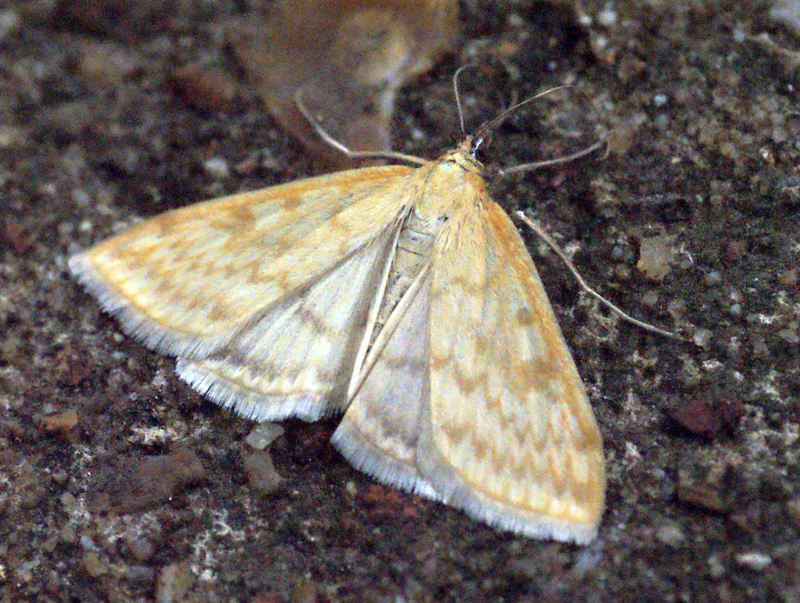
- Sitochroa verticalis
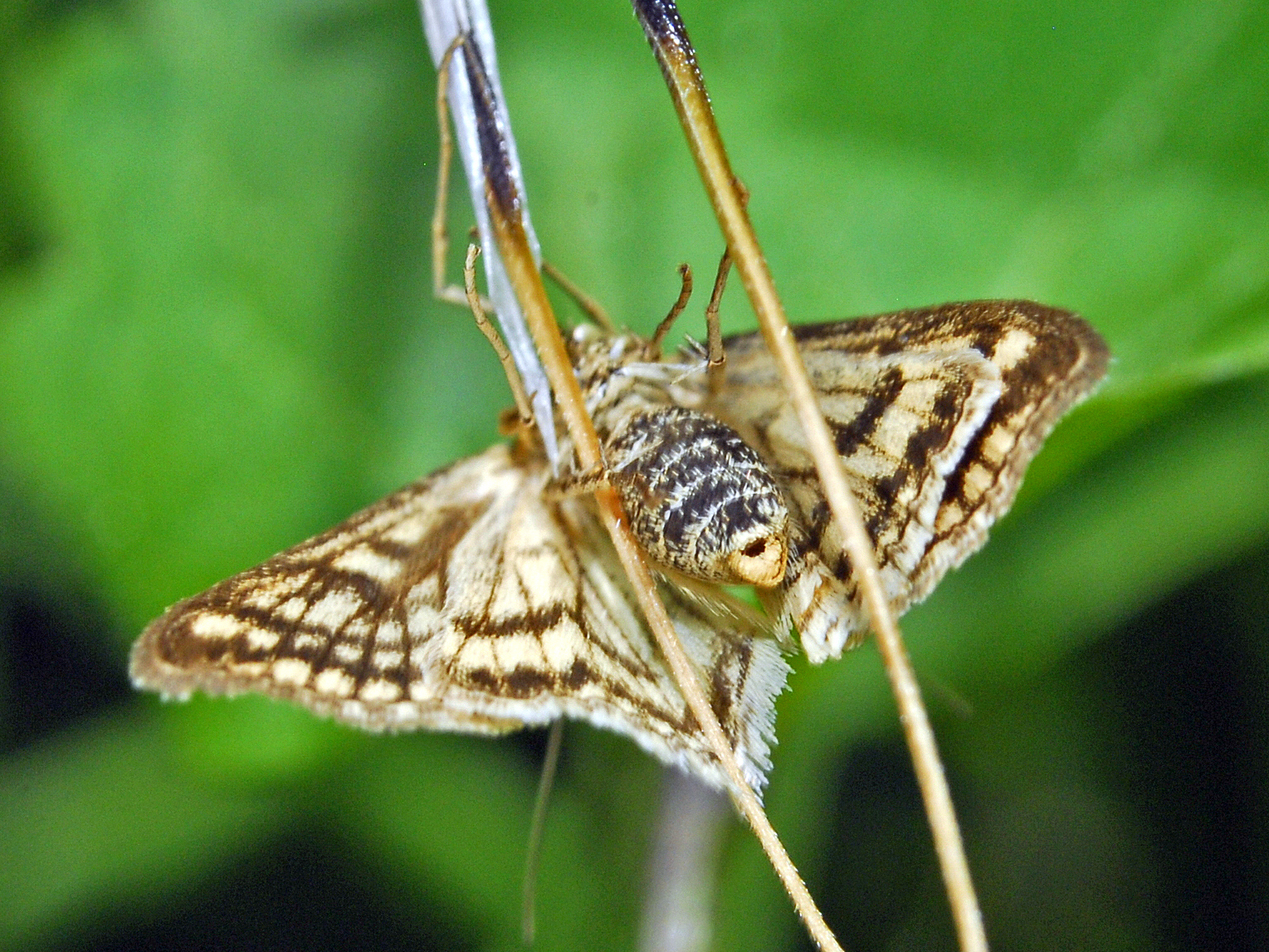
- Underside

Scientific classification
- Kingdom: Animalia
- Phylum: Arthropoda
- Class: Insecta
- Order: Lepidoptera
- Family: Crambidae
- Genus: Sitochroa
- Species: S. verticalis

Binomial name
- Sitochroa verticalis (Linnaeus, 1758)

Synonyms
- Phalaena (Pyralis) verticalis Linnaeus, 1758; Botys cinctalis Treitschke, 1829; Botys lavalis Herrich-Schäffer, 1849; Sitochroa verticalis nigricilialis (Ragonot, 1895); Phalaena inversa Fourcroy, 1785

= Sitochroa verticalis =

Species of moth

Sitochroa verticalis, common name lesser pearl, is a species of moth of the family Crambidae.

== Distribution and habitat ==
This species can be found in most of Europe, including British Islands. The distribution extends from west Portugal, across Central and Eastern Europe, Siberia to the Russian Far East and Japan. In the north the area extends to southern Sweden, in the south to Italy. These moths prefer open landscape with dry or slightly humid grassy areas.

== Description ==
Sitochroa verticalis can reach a wingspan of about 30–34 mm. These moths have yellowish or light ocher forewings with three thin brown cross lines, while the underside of the forewings are strongly-marked with dark brown lines. The hind wings are whitish yellow and have two darker transverse lines. The caterpillars are green, with a light brown head. They can reach a body length of about 29 mm (1.1 in). This species is rather similar to Ostrinia nubilalis.

== Biology ==
These moths fly from May to August, with one to two generations, depending on the location. The second generation may occur in August and September. They are nocturnal and come to artificial light sources. Usually they hinbernate in a hibernaculum and pupate the following spring. The larvae feed on a variety of herbaceous plants, mainly on Cirsium arvense, Cytisus scoparius, Viola odorata, Centaurea jacea, Atriplex, Rumex, Teucrium, Diplotaxis, Nettle and Sarothamnus species.

== Gallery ==
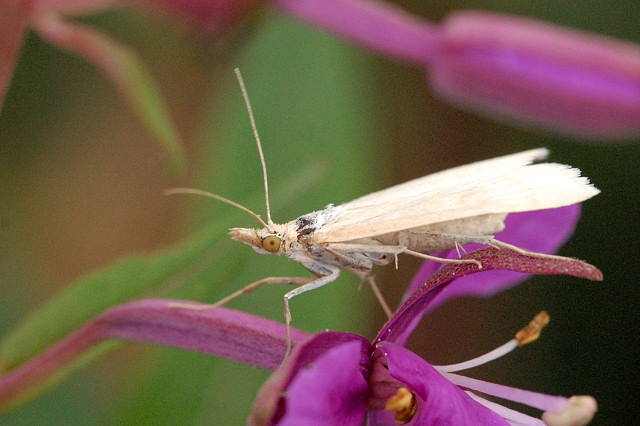
Adult. Side view

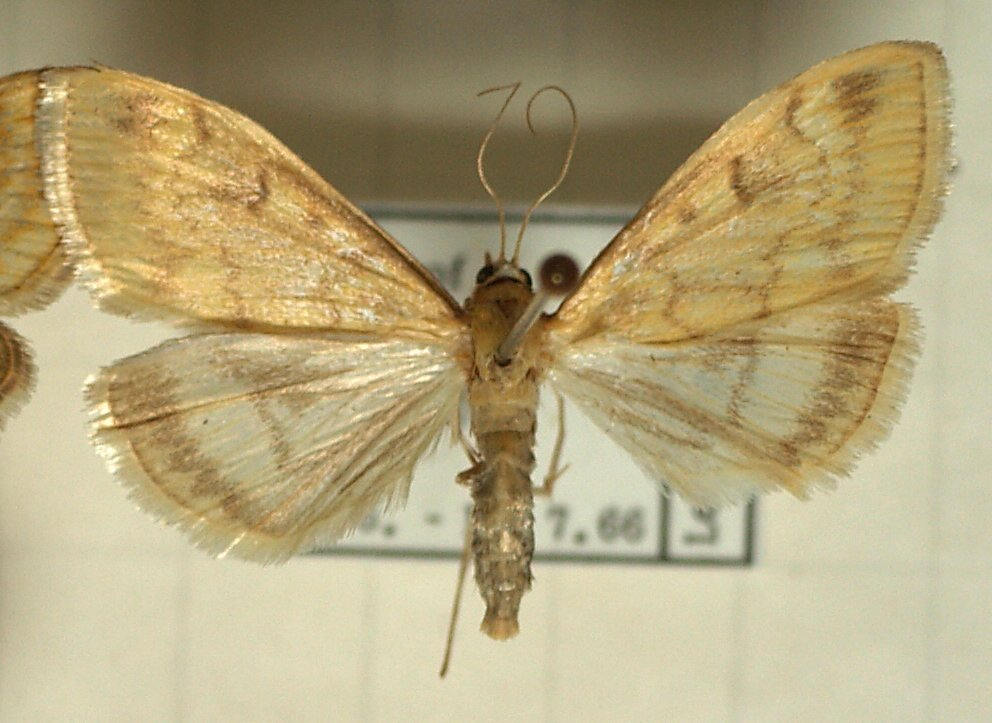
Mounted specimen

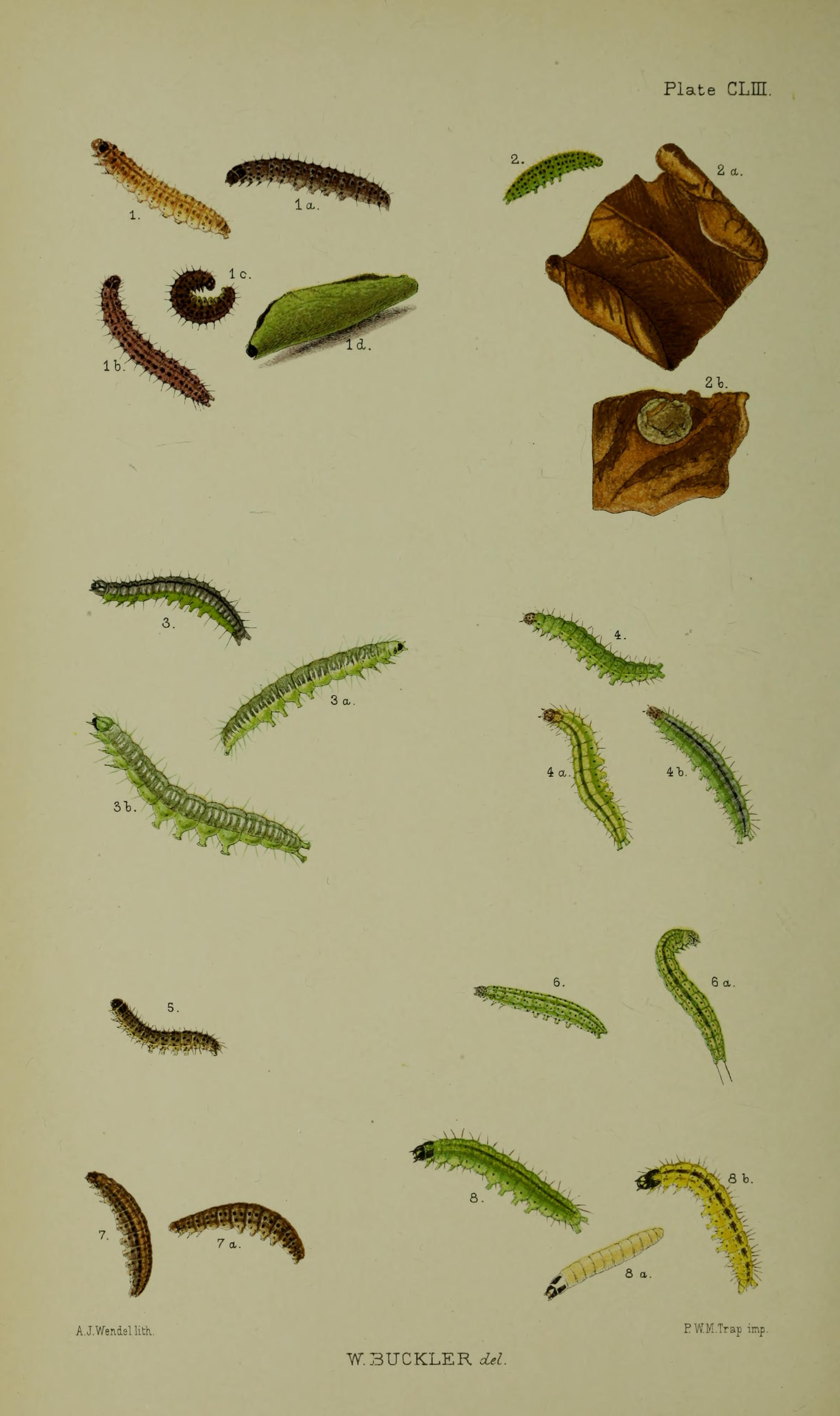
Illustration. Larvae in various stages
