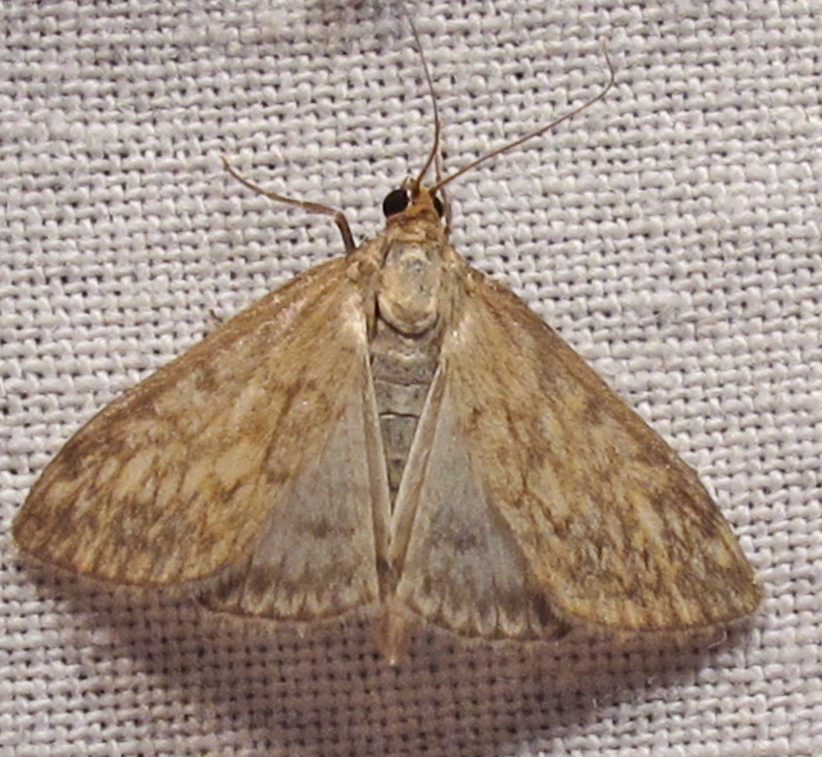

Scientific classification
- Domain: Eukaryota
- Kingdom: Animalia
- Phylum: Arthropoda
- Class: Insecta
- Order: Lepidoptera
- Family: Crambidae
- Genus: Sitochroa
- Species: S. chortalis

Binomial name
- Sitochroa chortalis (Grote, 1873)

Synonyms
- Eurycreon chortalis Grote, 1873; Loxostege chortalis

= Sitochroa chortalis =

Species of moth

Sitochroa chortalis, the dimorphic sitochroa moth, is a moth in the family Crambidae. It was described by Augustus Radcliffe Grote in 1873. It is found in North America, where it has been recorded from Nova Scotia to southern British Columbia, south to New Jersey, Arizona and northern California. The habitat consists of grassland and prairie areas.

Adults are on wing from mid-May to mid-July.

The larvae feed on Amaranthus retroflexus.
