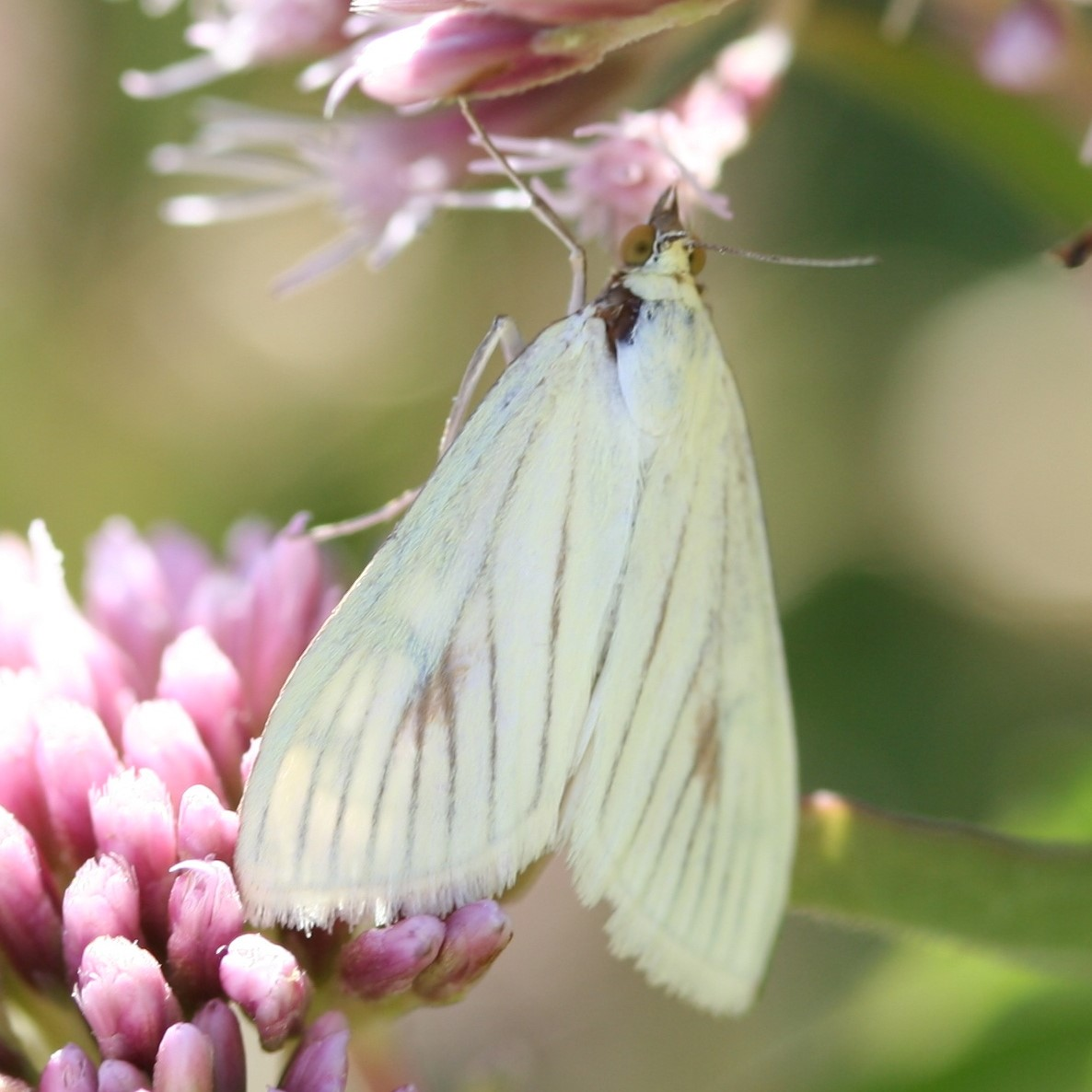

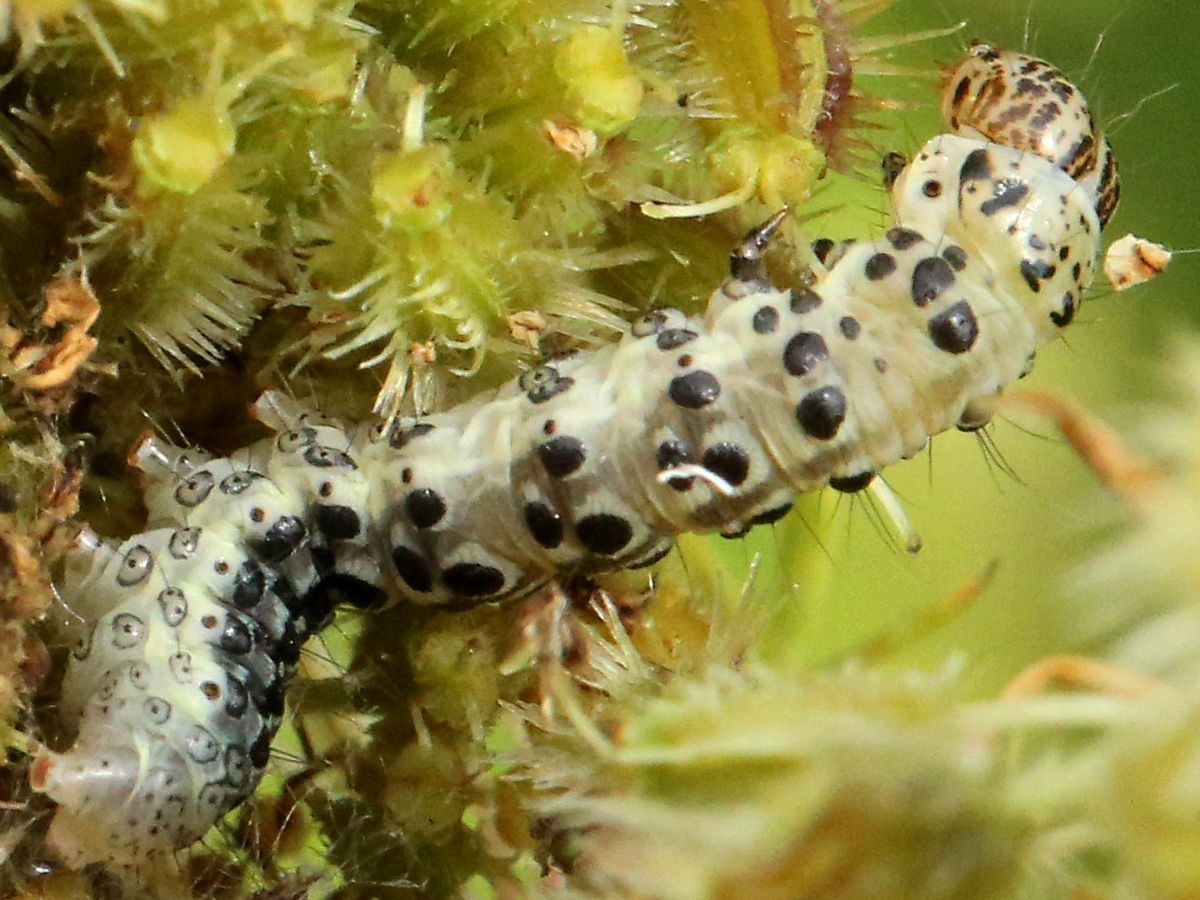
- Adult (top) and larva (bottom)

Scientific classification
- Domain: Eukaryota
- Kingdom: Animalia
- Phylum: Arthropoda
- Class: Insecta
- Order: Lepidoptera
- Family: Crambidae
- Genus: Sitochroa
- Species: S. palealis

Binomial name
- Sitochroa palealis (Denis & Schiffermüller, 1775)

Synonyms
- List: Pyralis palealis Denis & Schiffermüller, 1775; Sitochroa palealis anaxisalis (Walker, 1859); Loxostege (Phlyctaenodes) palealis var. extremalis Caradja, 1916; Phalaena flaveolata Hufnagel, 1767; Phalaena Pyralis stigmatalis Villers, 1789; Pyralis selenalis Hübner, 1796; Spilodes algiralis Allard, 1867

= Sitochroa palealis =

Species of moth

Sitochroa palealis, commonly known as the carrot seed moth, is a species of moth in the family Crambidae described by Michael Denis and Ignaz Schiffermüller in 1775. It is found in Europe and in 2002 the first specimen was reported in the United States.

The wingspan is 26–34 mm. The moth flies from June to July depending on the location.

The larvae feed on Daucus carota (of which cultivated carrots are a subspecies), Peucedanum oreoselinum, and species from the genera, Heracleum, Foeniculum (which includes cultivated fennel), and Silaum.
