= Sitochroa dasconalis =

Scientific classification
- Kingdom: Animalia
- Phylum: Arthropoda
- Class: Insecta
- Order: Lepidoptera
- Family: Crambidae
- Genus: Sitochroa
- Species: S. dasconalis

Binomial name
- Sitochroa dasconalis (Walker, 1859)

Synonyms
- Spilodes dasconalis Walker, 1859

Species of moth

Sitochroa dasconalis is a moth in the family Crambidae. It was described by Francis Walker in 1859. It is found in North America, where it has been recorded from Massachusetts to Illinois, south to Florida and then west to Texas. Adults have been recorded on wing from April to July.

The larvae feed on Baptisia tinctoria.
