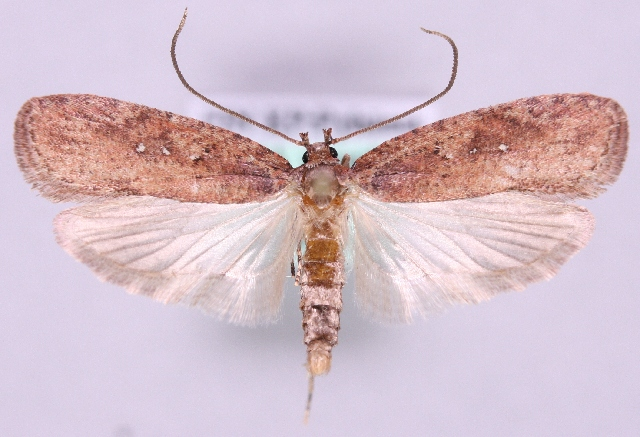

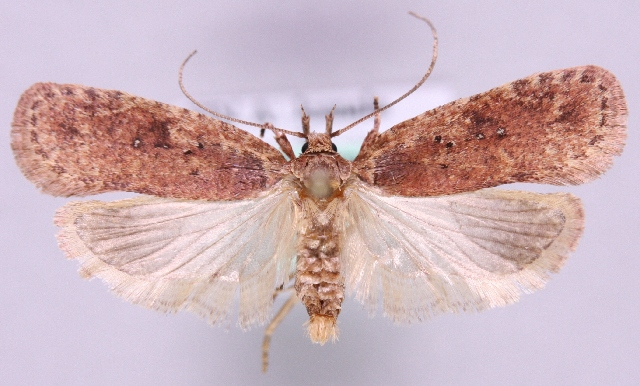

Scientific classification
- Kingdom: Animalia
- Phylum: Arthropoda
- Clade: Pancrustacea
- Class: Insecta
- Order: Lepidoptera
- Family: Depressariidae
- Genus: Agonopterix
- Species: A. ciliella

Binomial name
- Agonopterix ciliella (Stainton, 1849)

Synonyms
- Depressaria ciliella Stainton, 1849; Depressaria annexella Zeller, 1868

= Agonopterix ciliella =

Species of moth

Agonopterix ciliella is a moth of the family Depressariidae. It is found in most of Europe, except the Iberian Peninsula, most of the Balkan Peninsula and the Benelux. It is also found in North America.

The wingspan is 19–24 mm. The forewings are red-brown, sometimes sprinkled with dark fuscous; first discal stigma blackish, posteriorly edged with a white dot, and preceded by a blackish dot obliquely above it, second white, sometimes obscurely dark edged, usually preceded by a similar dot. Hindwings pale whitish-fuscous, cilia reddish-tinged. The larva is green; dorsal and subdorsal lines darker; dots black; head ochreous-yellowish; 2 with two blackish green crescentic marks.

Adults are on wing from August to May.

The larvae feed on various umbelliferous plants, including Angelica sylvestris, Aegopodium podagraria, Heracleum sphondylium, Daucus, Selinum, Silaum, Chaerophyllum, Pastinaca, Anthriscus, Meum and Peucedanum palustre. They feed from within spun or rolled leaves. Larvae can be found from June to September. The species overwinters as an adult.
