= Sitochroa concoloralis =

Scientific classification
- Domain: Eukaryota
- Kingdom: Animalia
- Phylum: Arthropoda
- Class: Insecta
- Order: Lepidoptera
- Family: Crambidae
- Genus: Sitochroa
- Species: S. concoloralis

Binomial name
- Sitochroa concoloralis (Lederer, 1857)

Synonyms
- Botys concoloralis Lederer, 1857; Loxostege concoloralis

Species of moth

Sitochroa concoloralis is a moth in the family Crambidae. It was described by Julius Lederer in 1857. It is found in Lebanon.
