= Sitochroa aureolalis =

Scientific classification
- Domain: Eukaryota
- Kingdom: Animalia
- Phylum: Arthropoda
- Class: Insecta
- Order: Lepidoptera
- Family: Crambidae
- Genus: Sitochroa
- Species: S. aureolalis

Binomial name
- Sitochroa aureolalis (Hulst, 1886)

Synonyms
- Eurycreon aureolalis Hulst, 1886; Pyrausta cyralis Druce, 1895

Species of moth

Sitochroa aureolalis is a moth in the family Crambidae. It was described by George Duryea Hulst in 1886. It is found in the United States, where it has been recorded from southern California to Arizona and Texas. It is also found in northern Mexico.

The wingspan is about 25 mm for both males and females. The forewings are bright deep golden yellow. The hindwings are yellow fuscous. Adults have been recorded on wing from May to June and from August to September.
