= Sitochroa subtilis =

Scientific classification
- Domain: Eukaryota
- Kingdom: Animalia
- Phylum: Arthropoda
- Class: Insecta
- Order: Lepidoptera
- Family: Crambidae
- Genus: Sitochroa
- Species: S. subtilis

Binomial name
- Sitochroa subtilis (Filipjev, 1927)

Synonyms
- Loxostege subtilis Filipjev, 1927; Pyrausta subtilis

Species of moth

Sitochroa subtilis is a moth in the family Crambidae. It was described by Ivan Nikolayevich Filipjev in 1927. It is found in Russia.
