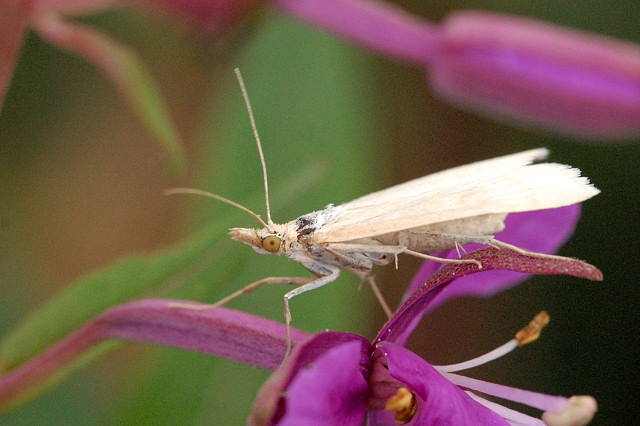
- Sitochroa verticalis

Scientific classification
- Domain: Eukaryota
- Kingdom: Animalia
- Phylum: Arthropoda
- Class: Insecta
- Order: Lepidoptera
- Family: Crambidae
- Subfamily: Pyraustinae
- Genus: Sitochroa; Hübner, 1825

Synonyms
- Spilodes Guenée, 1849

= Sitochroa =

Genus of moths

Sitochroa is a genus of moths of the family Crambidae.

== Species ==
- Sitochroa aureolalis (Hulst, 1886)
- Sitochroa chortalis (Grote, 1873)
- Sitochroa concoloralis (Lederer, 1857)
- Sitochroa dasconalis (Walker, 1859)
- Sitochroa palealis (Denis & Schiffermüller, 1775)
- Sitochroa straminealis (Hampson, 1900)
- Sitochroa subtilis Filipjev, 1927
- Sitochroa umbrosalis (Warren, 1892)
- Sitochroa verticalis (Linnaeus, 1758)
