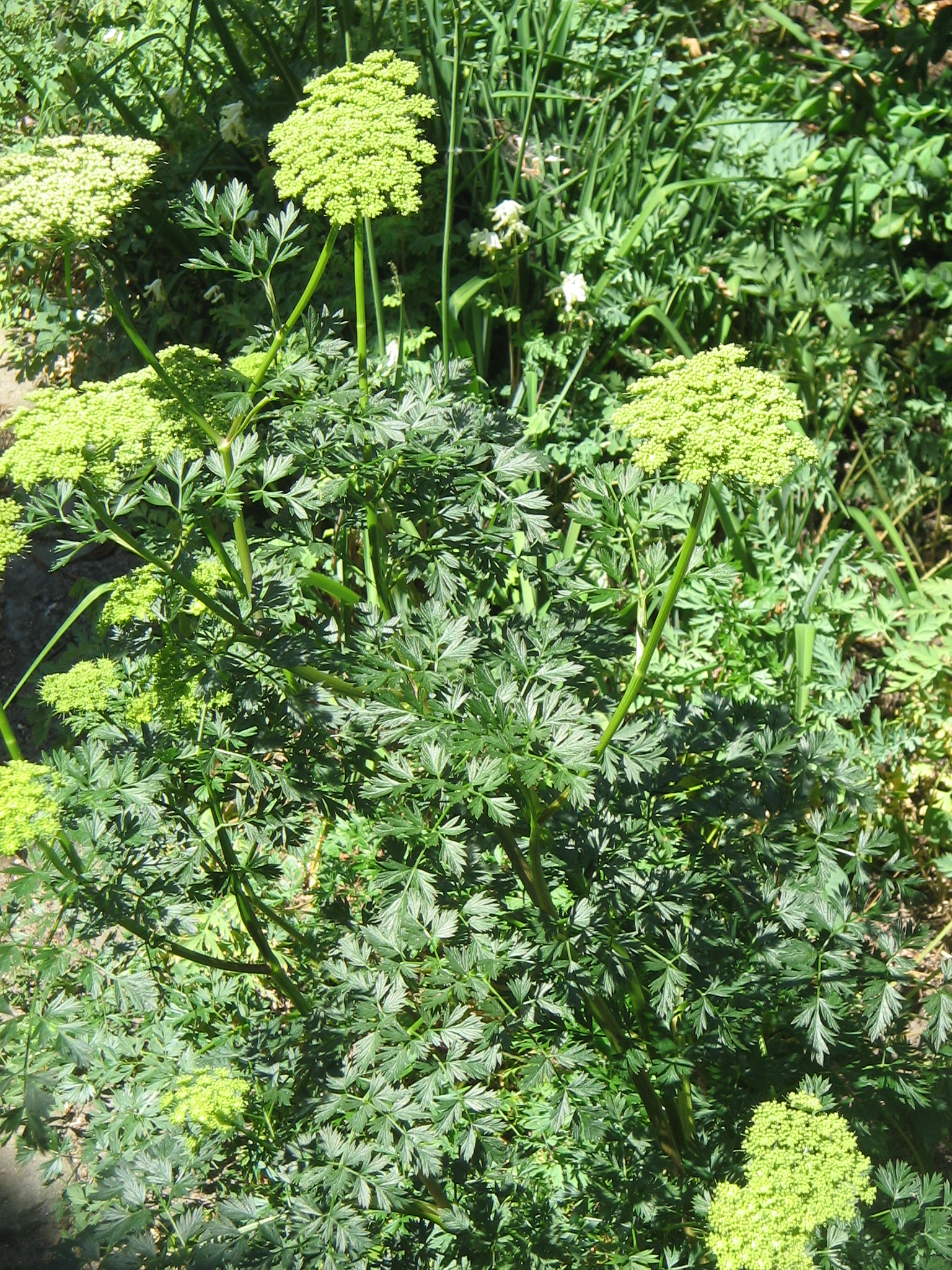

Scientific classification
- Kingdom: Plantae
- Clade: Tracheophytes
- Clade: Angiosperms
- Clade: Eudicots
- Clade: Asterids
- Order: Apiales
- Family: Apiaceae
- Subfamily: Apioideae
- Genus: Cenolophium; W.D.J.Koch
- Species: C. denudatum

Binomial name
- Cenolophium denudatum (Hornem.) Tutin

Synonyms
- Cenolophium fischeri (Spreng.) W.D.J. Koch ex DC.; Athamanta denudata Fisch. ex Hornem.

= Cenolophium =

Genus of flowering plants

Cenolophium is a genus of flowering plants in the carrot family Apiaceae (Umbelliferae). Its only species is Cenolophium denudatum (known as Baltic parsley), native to Europe and Asia. A herbaceous perennial, it grows to 1.5 m (4.9 ft) tall by 0.5 m (1.6 ft) wide, with dark green divided leaves and, in summer, many umbels of tiny pale green or white flowers on branching naked stems (hence the Latin specific name denudatum). The stems are sometimes purple in colour. The flowers are attractive to numerous insects.

In cultivation in the UK, this plant has gained the Royal Horticultural Society's Award of Garden Merit (confirmed 2017).

== Gallery ==
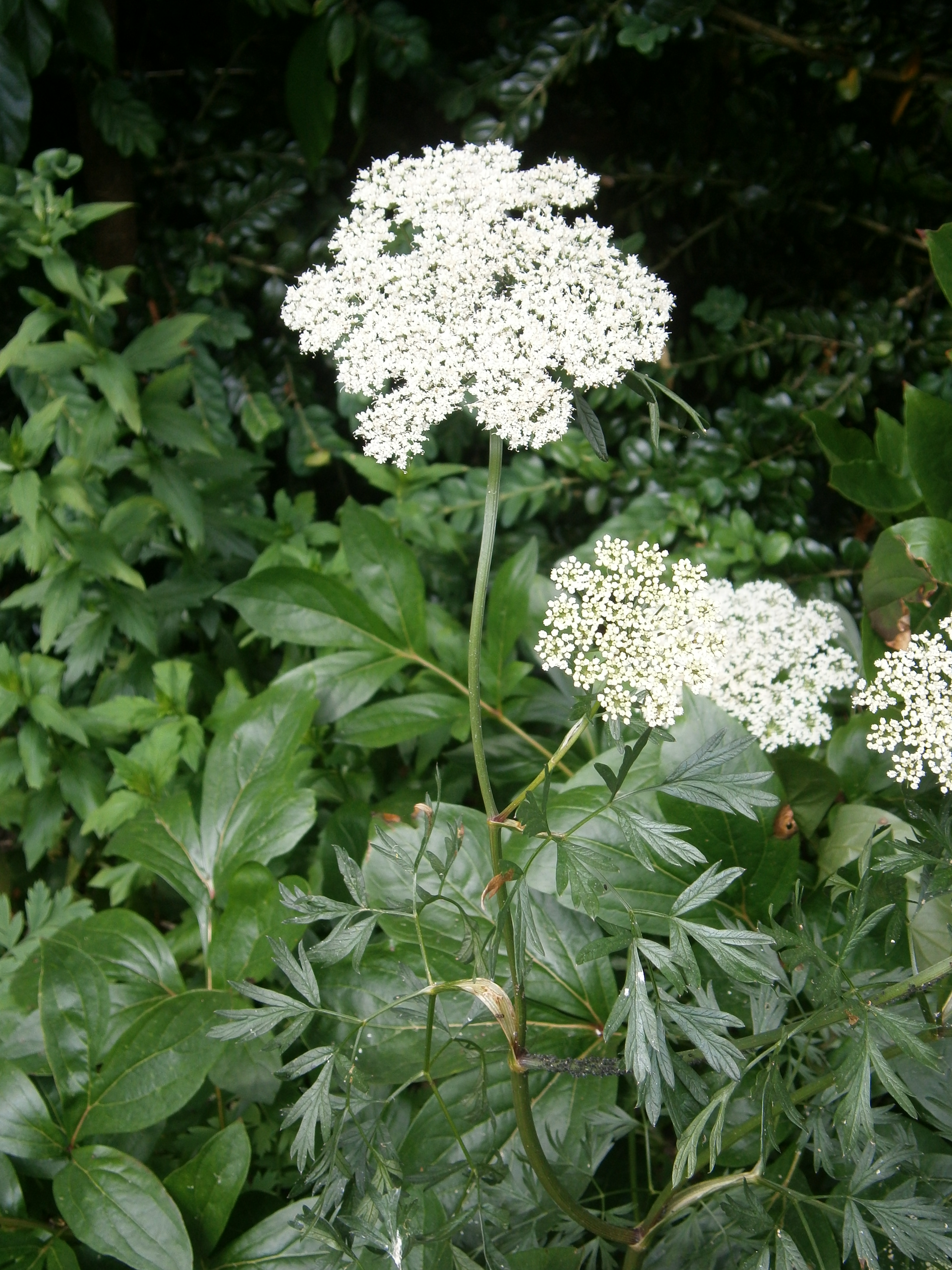

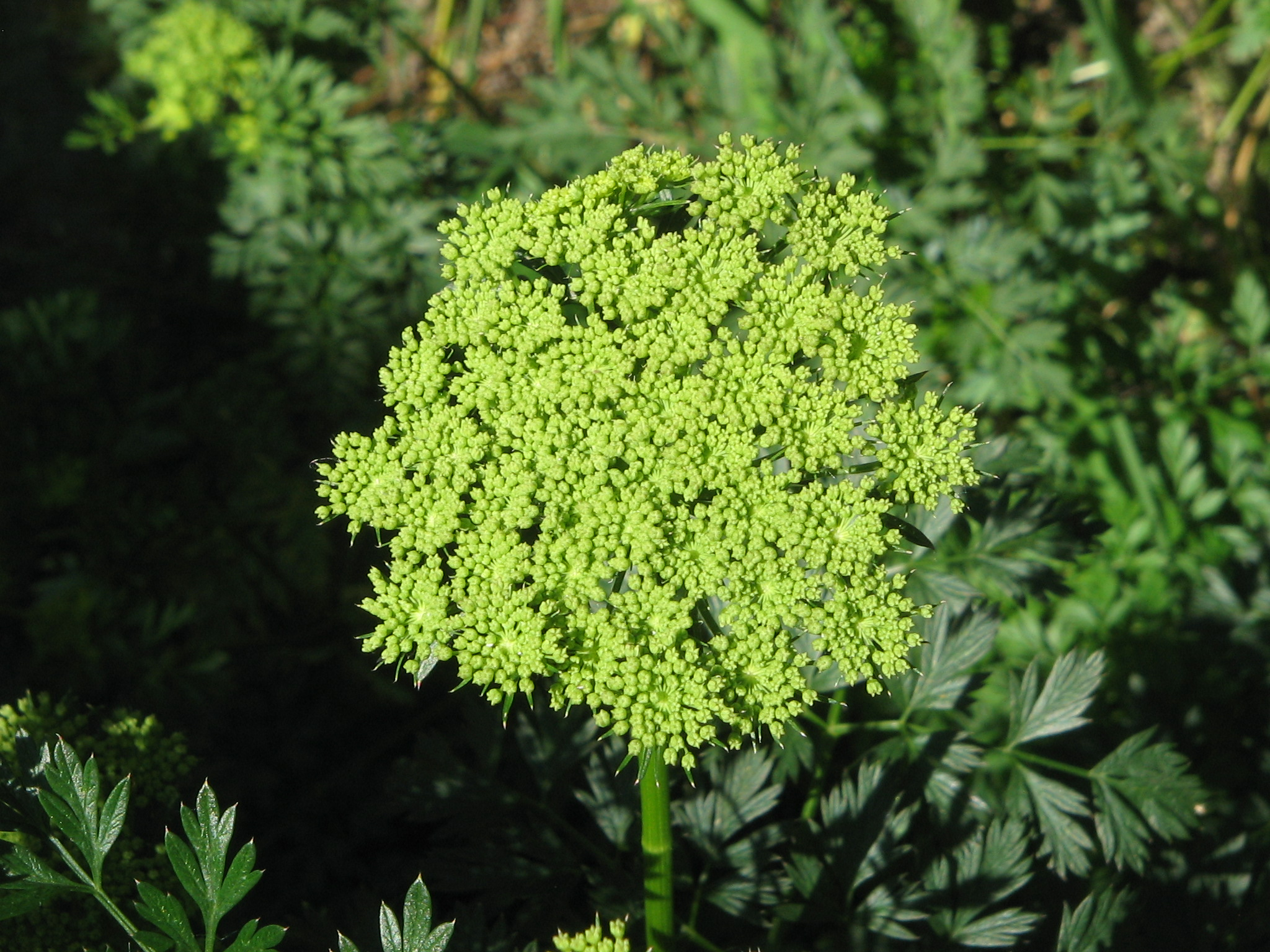

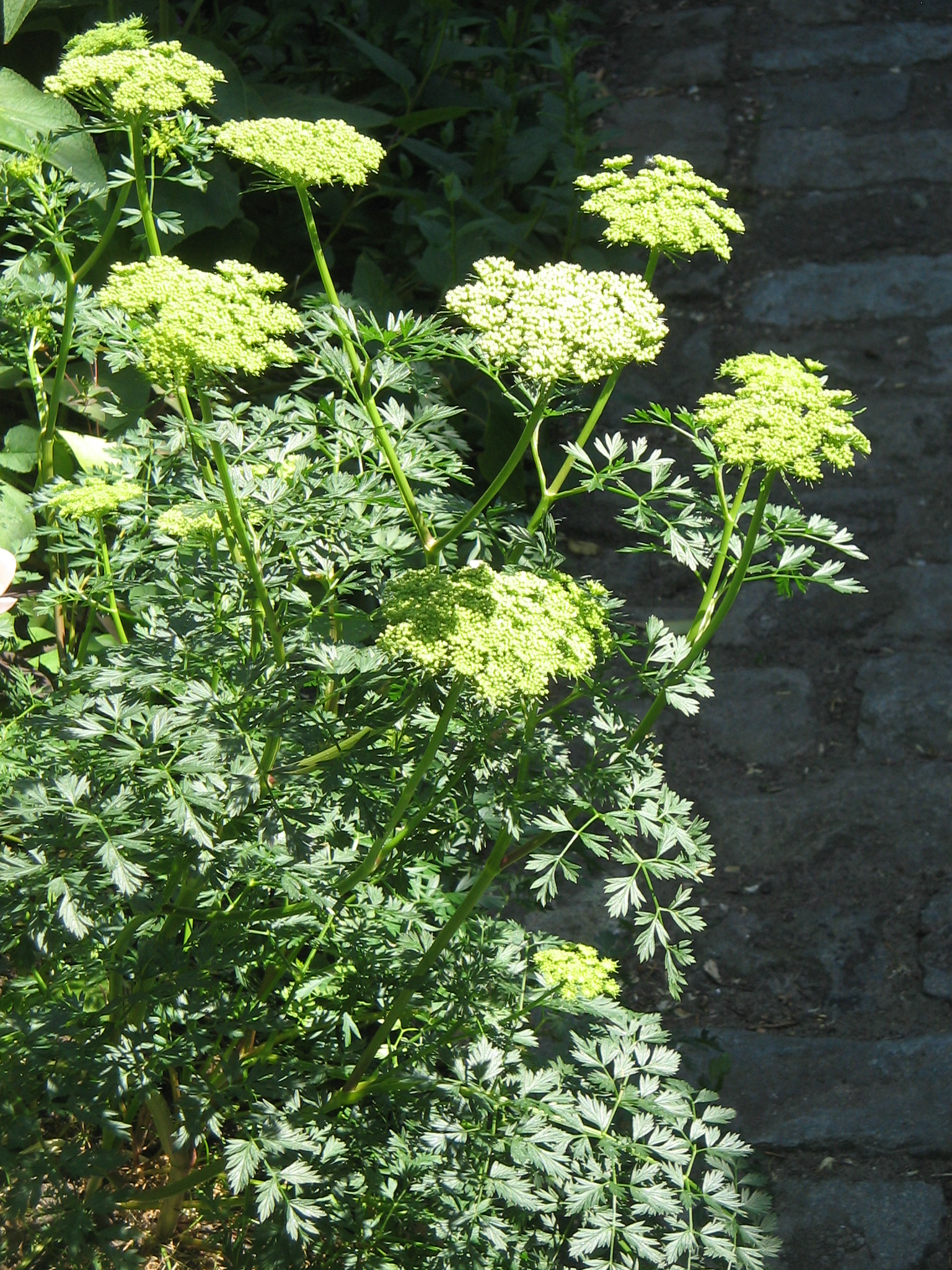
