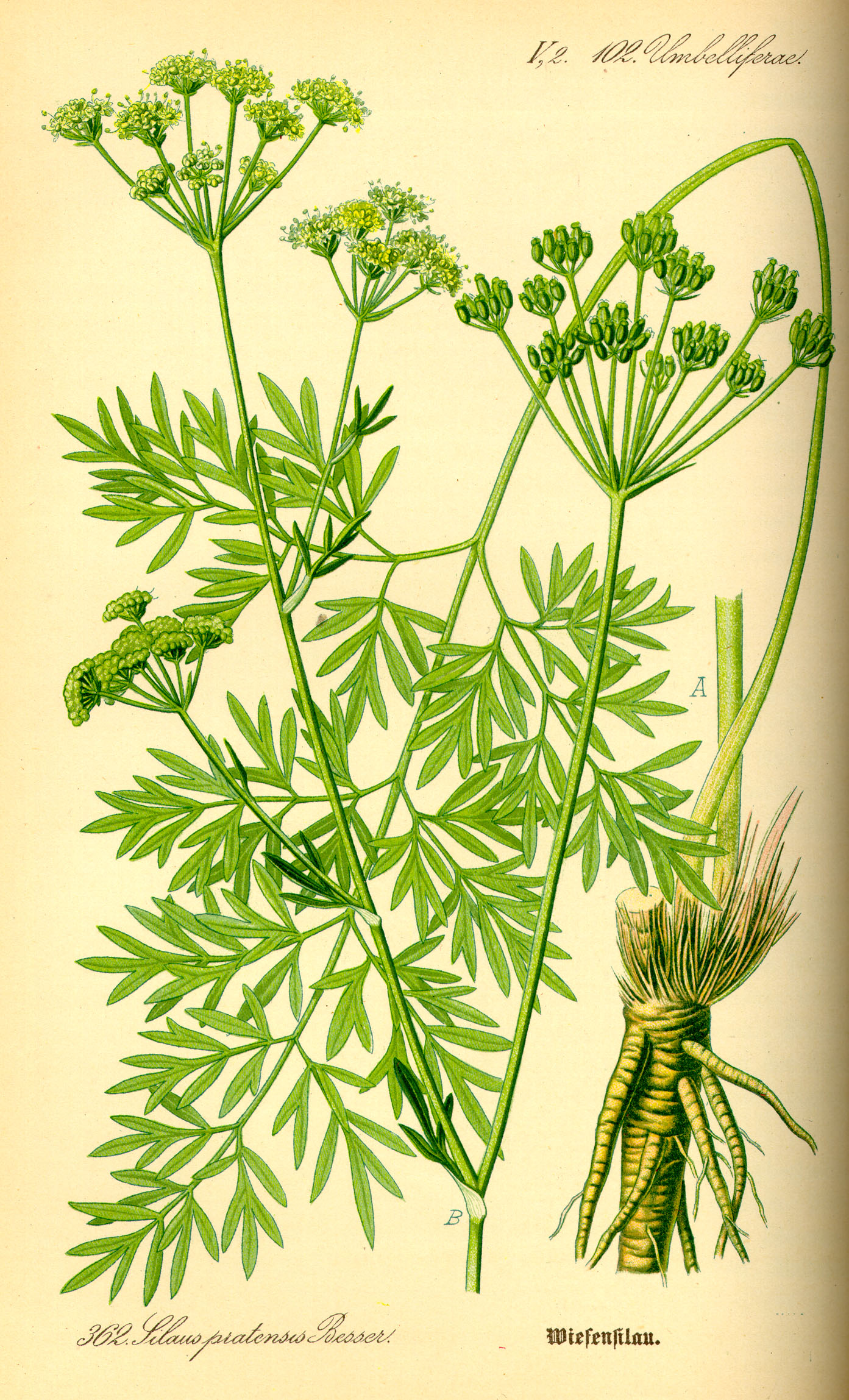
- A botanical illustration of Silaum silaus

Scientific classification
- Kingdom: Plantae
- Clade: Tracheophytes
- Clade: Angiosperms
- Clade: Eudicots
- Clade: Asterids
- Order: Apiales
- Family: Apiaceae
- Subfamily: Apioideae
- Genus: Silaum; Mill.

= Silaum =

Flowering plants in the carrot / parsley family

Silaum is a genus of flowering plants in the carrot/parsley family, Apiaceae. There are currently ten species placed into the genus, a list of which is provided below.

== Description ==
Plants in the genus Silaum have umbels which are characteristic of plants in the family Apiaceae (they are umbelliferous, "umbel-bearing"); the umbels in Silaus species tend to lack bracts. Silaum species also tend to have a few umbellules (secondary umbels of compound umbels), and these umbellules have several small bracts called bractlets. Remains of dead leaves can often be found at the base of the plant; plants in Silaum are richly branched.

The fruits of Silaum species have a carpophore, a supporting slender stalk for each half of a gape or burst open (dehisced) fruit - these are common throughout the family Apiaceae; the carpophore is thread or filament-shaped (filiform). In addition, Silaum fruits are elongated, divided and not flattened. The mericarps (one carpel of umbelliferous fruit) have acute edges and five, rather low ridges. Plants in Silaus also have an oil tube in the fruit, called a vitta - there is one vitta per every ridge of furrow (a vallecula), but are indistinct at maturity. The petals that surround the flowers are yellow.

== Taxonomy and naming ==
Silaum was first formally described in 1754 by the Scottish botanist in charge of the Chelsea Physic Garden, Philip Miller; this description was published in his own reference series, The Gardeners Dictionary (abr., ed. 4 (1754)). The etymology of Silaum was not explicitly offered by Miller, who applied a plant name used by Pliny, though it may refer to the mountainous plateau La Sila in southern Italy.

=== Species ===
The Global Biodiversity Information Facility (GBIF) lists ten species that are currently placed in the genus Silaum:

- Silaum besseri (DC.) Galushko
- Silaum foliosum (Sommier & Levier) Grossh.
- Silaum perfoliatum (Pharm. ex Wehmer) M.Hiroe
- Silaum peucedanoides (M.Bieb.) M.Hiroe
- Silaum popovii (Korovin) M.Hiroe
- Silaum saxatilis Bajtenov
- Silaum serotinum (Pers.) M.Hiroe
- Silaum silaus (L.) Schinz & Thell.
- Silaum tenellum (Velen.) M.Hiroe
- Silaum tenuifolium (Poir.) Reduron
