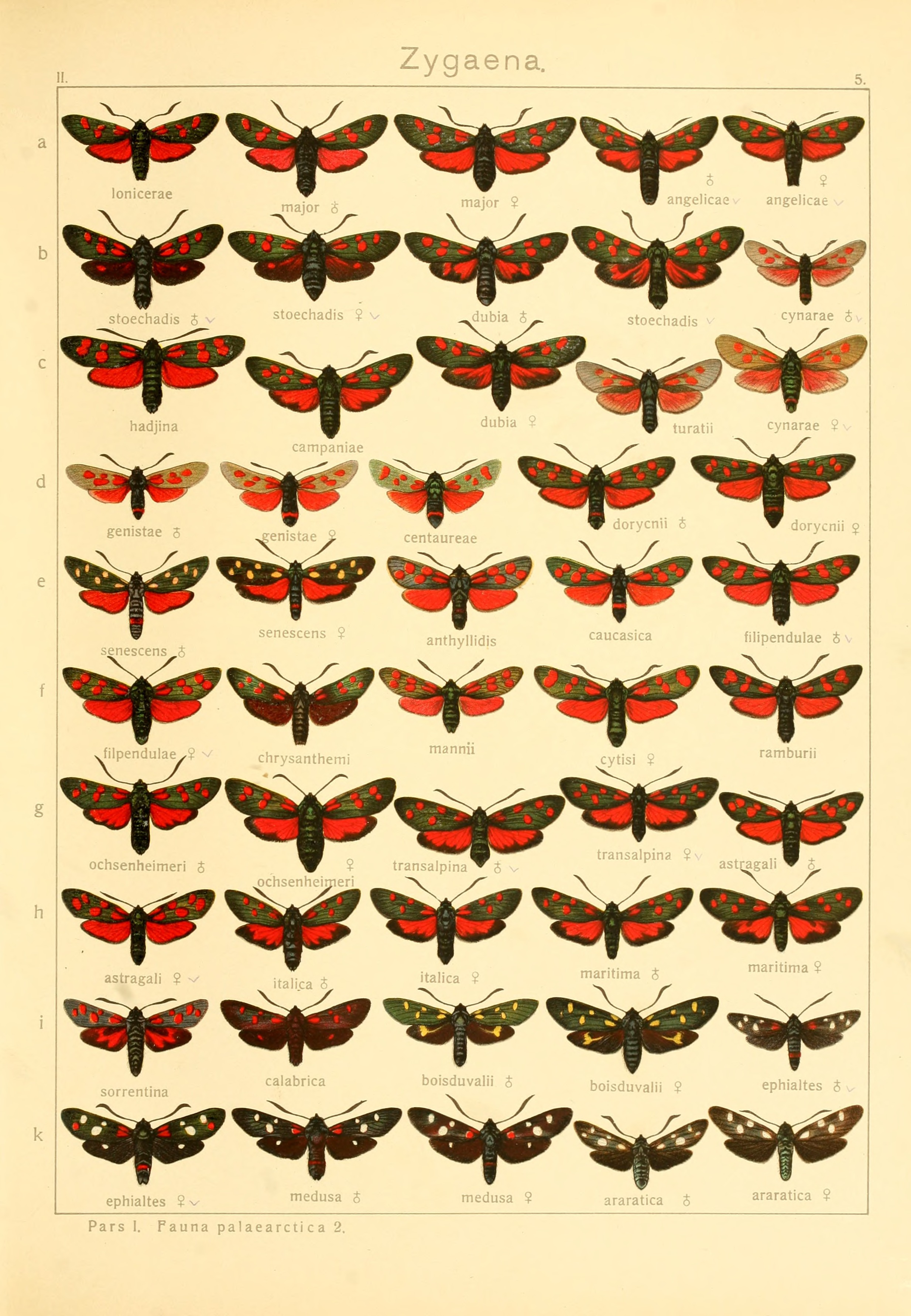
- Z. c. cynarae and Z. c. turatii in Seitz

Scientific classification
- Domain: Eukaryota
- Kingdom: Animalia
- Phylum: Arthropoda
- Class: Insecta
- Order: Lepidoptera
- Family: Zygaenidae
- Genus: Zygaena
- Species: Z. cynarae

Binomial name
- Zygaena cynarae (Esper, 1789)

Synonyms
- Sphinx cynarae Esper, 1789; Sphinx veronicae Borkhausen, 1789; Sphinx millefolii Borkhausen, 1789; Sphinx cinarae Esper, 1800; Zygaena uralensis Herrich-Schäffer, 1846; Zygaena genistae Herrich-Schäffer, 1846; Zygaena goberti Le Charles, 1952; Zygaena slovakica Reiss, 1968; Zygaena turatii Standfuss, 1892

= Zygaena cynarae =

Species of moth

Zygaena cynarae is a species of moth in the Zygaenidae family. It is found from France east to Russia.

It is a large Zygaena with translucent wings with oval or rounded red spots. The anterior median spot is well developed. The basal posterior and median posterior spots are large and linked with a red line which can be missing in some specimens. The wingspan is about 30–31 mm.

== Technical description and variation (Seitz) ==
Z. cynarae Exp. (= millefolii Esp.) 5-spotted, the body entirely without hairs, with metallic green gloss; wings very sparsely scaled, the colour appearing pale. The abdomen bears a red ring which is more distinct at the sides than above. In ab. turatii Stdf. [now subspecies] the abdominal belt is entirely missing above, appearing only as a lateral spot; North Italy, Dalmatia; near Pegli, at the Riviera, I met constantly with this form, while it occurs elsewhere only sparingly among the type-form. — ab. tricingulata Burgeff [ synonym of cynarae ] has 3 abdominal belts, which, however, are usually red only above and laterally, not below. —. In genistae H.-Sch. (= dahurica H.-Sch. ), from South France, Hungary and the Tyrol, the forewing is paler and more transparent. — centaureae Fisch.-Wald. [now full species Zygaena centaureae ] has a stronger antenna and the 5th spot is prolonged towards the hind angle. — Larva greenish above, yellowish grey at the sides; subdorsal black dots, near which there are yellow spots; head greyish green.

== Biology ==
Adults are on wing from mid May to July.

The larvae feed on Peucedanum species, including Peucedanum cervaria. Part of the larvae overwinter multiple times. Full-grown larvae can be found from April to the beginning of June.

It is a very local and sedentary species, which requires dense colonies of its hostplant. They are sluggish and clumsy insects; the individuals occur more singly, there being apparently no decided flight-places as is the case with other Burnets.

== Subspecies ==
- Zygaena cynarae cynarae
- Zygaena cynarae adriatica Burgeff, 1926
- Zygaena cynarae florianii Dujardin, 1965
- Zygaena cynarae franconica Holik, 1936
- Zygaena cynarae goberti Le Charles, 1952
- Zygaena cynarae jadovnika Rauch, 1977
- Zygaena cynarae samarensis Holik, 1939
- Zygaena cynarae tolmezzana Meier, 1957
- Zygaena cynarae turatii Standfuss, 1892
- Zygaena cynarae tusca Verity, 1930
- Zygaena cynarae vallettensis Reiss, 1958
- Zygaena cynarae waltharii Burgeff, 1926

== Bibliography ==
- Šašić, Martina; Nahirnić, Ana; Tarmann, Gerhard M. (2016-12-31). "Zygaenidae (Lepidoptera) in the Lepidoptera collections of the Croatian Natural History Museum". Natura Croatica: Periodicum Musei Historiae Naturalis Croatici. 25 (2): 233–248. doi:10.20302/NC.2016.25.19. eISSN 1848-7386.
