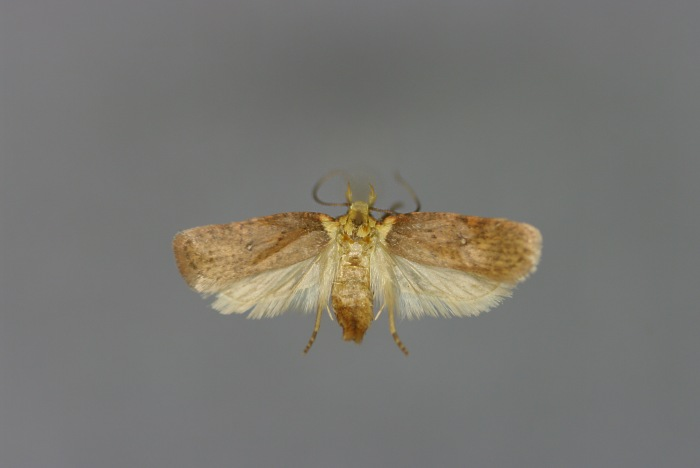

Scientific classification
- Kingdom: Animalia
- Phylum: Arthropoda
- Clade: Pancrustacea
- Class: Insecta
- Order: Lepidoptera
- Family: Depressariidae
- Genus: Agonopterix
- Species: A. parilella

Binomial name
- Agonopterix parilella (Treitschke, 1835)

Synonyms
- Haemylis parilella Treitschke, 1835; Haemylis humerella Duponchel, 1838

= Agonopterix parilella =

Species of moth

Agonopterix parilella is a moth of the family Depressariidae. It is found in France, Germany, Italy, Switzerland, Austria, the Czech Republic, Poland, Slovakia, Hungary, Croatia, Romania, the Baltic region, Sweden and Russia.

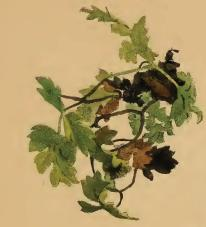
A leaf of Peucedanum oreoselinum twisted by larva

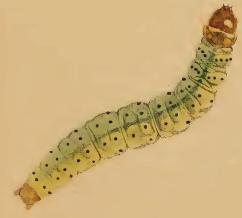
Larva

The wingspan is 13–17 mm. Adults are on wing from June to August.

The larvae feed on Peucedanum species, including Peucedanum cervaria and Peucedanum oreoselinum.
