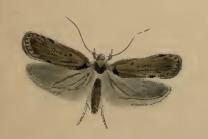

Scientific classification
- Kingdom: Animalia
- Phylum: Arthropoda
- Clade: Pancrustacea
- Class: Insecta
- Order: Lepidoptera
- Family: Depressariidae
- Genus: Agonopterix
- Species: A. putridella

Binomial name
- Agonopterix putridella (Denis & Schiffermuller, 1775)

Synonyms
- Tinea putridella Denis & Schiffermuller, 1775; Depressaria peucedanella Milliere, 1881; Depressaria esterella Millière, 1881

= Agonopterix putridella =

Species of moth

Agonopterix putridella is a moth of the family Depressariidae. It is found in Great Britain, France, Germany, Switzerland, Austria, the Czech Republic, Hungary, Romania, Ukraine and Russia.

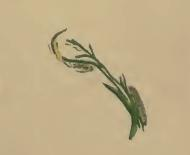
A piece of Peucedanum officinale leaf attacked by larva

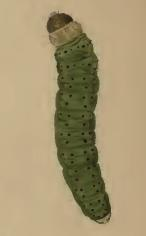
Larva

The wingspan is 15–18 mm. Adults are on wing from July to August.

The larvae feed on Peucedanum species, including Peucedanum officinale, Peucedanum cervaria and Peucedanum alsaticum. They feed in an untidy gathering or spinning of leaves of the host plant. Larvae can be found from May to June.
