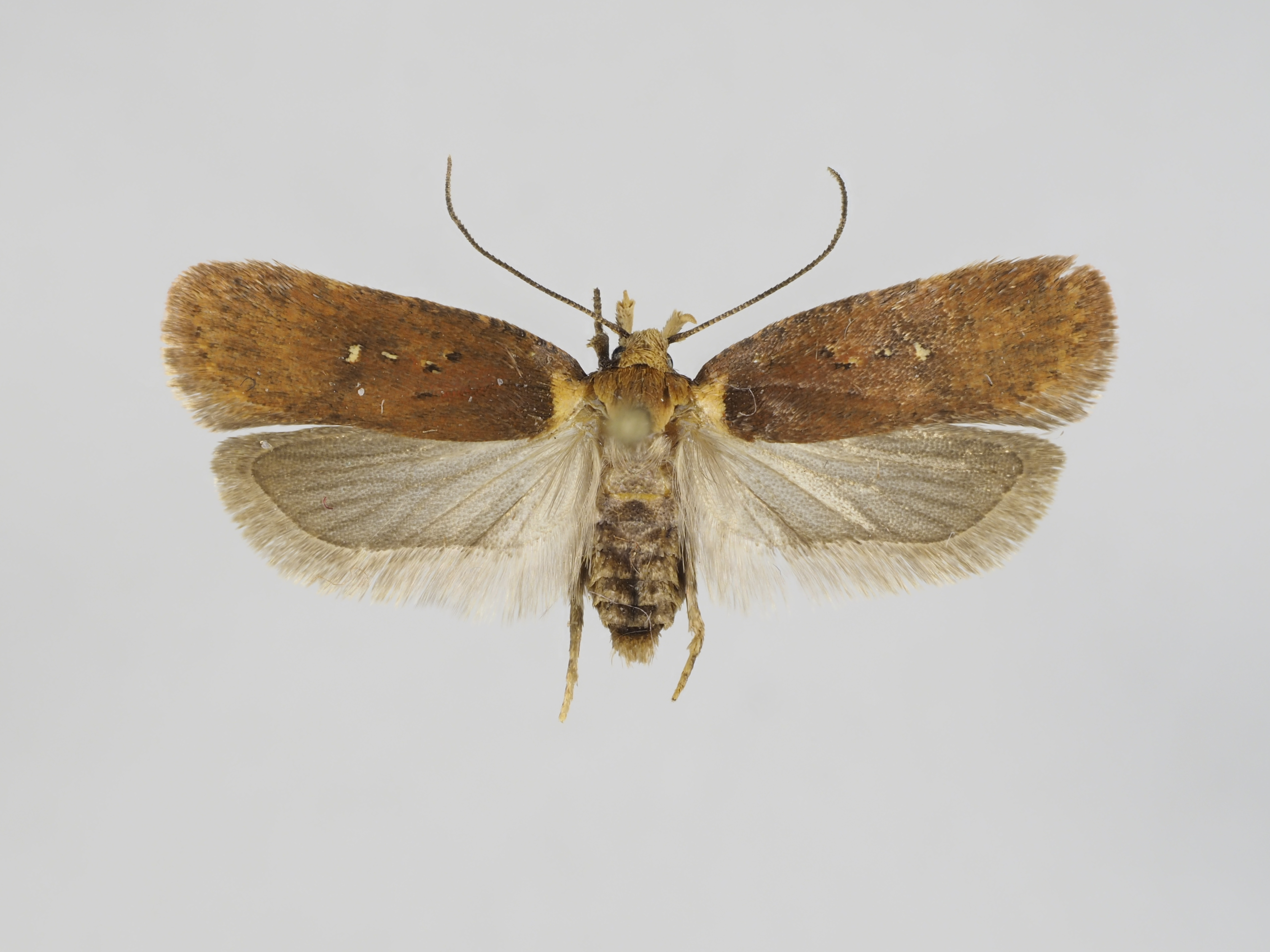

Scientific classification
- Kingdom: Animalia
- Phylum: Arthropoda
- Clade: Pancrustacea
- Class: Insecta
- Order: Lepidoptera
- Family: Depressariidae
- Genus: Agonopterix
- Species: A. selini

Binomial name
- Agonopterix selini (Heinemann, 1870)

Synonyms
- Depressaria selini Heinemann, 1870

= Agonopterix selini =

Species of moth

Agonopterix selini is a moth of the family Depressariidae. It is found in most of Europe, except Ireland, Great Britain, the Benelux, Portugal and most of the Balkan Peninsula.

The wingspan is 15–18 mm.

The larvae feed on Selinum and Peucedanum species, including Peucedanum cervaria and Peucedanum oreoselinum.
