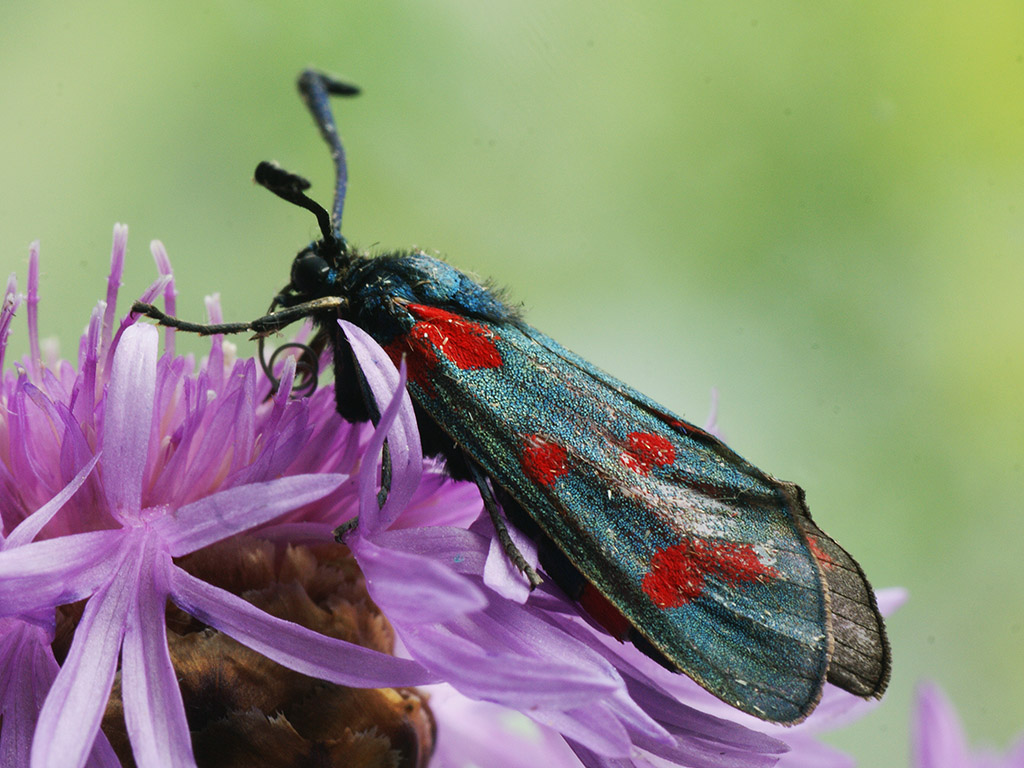

Scientific classification
- Domain: Eukaryota
- Kingdom: Animalia
- Phylum: Arthropoda
- Class: Insecta
- Order: Lepidoptera
- Family: Zygaenidae
- Genus: Zygaena
- Species: Z. centaureae

Binomial name
- Zygaena centaureae Fischer de Waldheim, 1832

Synonyms
- Zigaena mannerheimi Chardiny, [1838]; Zygaena mannerheimi

= Zygaena centaureae =

Species of moth

Zygaena centaureae is a species of moth in the Zygaenidae family. It is found in Ukraine and Russia. It is similar to Zygaena cynarae and was once considered to be a form of that species. It has stronger antennae and the 5th spot is prolonged towards the hind angle.
