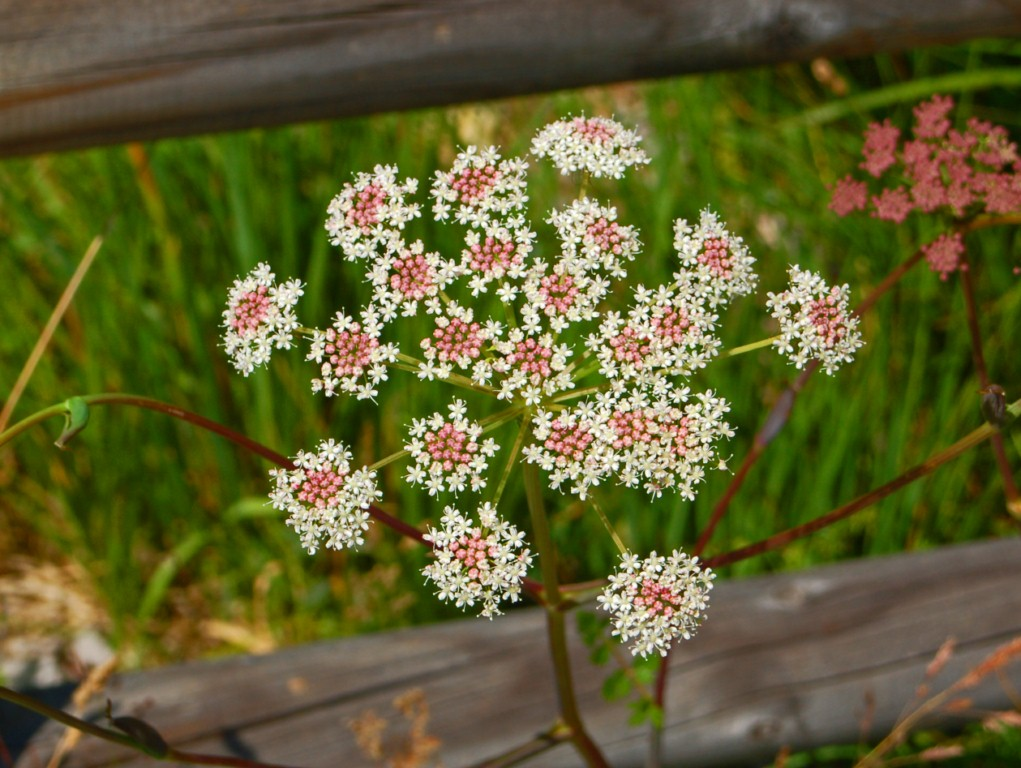
- Umbel of Peucedanum cervaria

Scientific classification
- Kingdom: Plantae
- Clade: Tracheophytes
- Clade: Angiosperms
- Clade: Eudicots
- Clade: Asterids
- Order: Apiales
- Family: Apiaceae
- Genus: Peucedanum
- Species: P. cervaria

Binomial name
- Peucedanum cervaria (L.) Cusson ex Lapeyr.

Synonyms
- Cervaria rivini Gaertn.; Selinum cervaria L.; Athamantha cervaria (L.) L.; Ligusticum cervaria (L.) Vill.

= Peucedanum cervaria =

Species of flowering plant

Peucedanum cervaria is a herbaceous plant in the genus Peucedanum belonging to the carrot family Apiaceae.

== Description ==
Peucedanum cervaria reaches on average 40–120 centimetres (16–47 in) in height, with a maximum of 150 centimetres (59 in). The stems are cylindrical, glabrous and erect. They are more or less branched and the leaves are slightly blue-green and two to three times pinnatifid. The large umbels have 9 to 30 rays bearing small white flowers. The flowering period extends from July through September in their native habitat.

This plant has its overwintering buds situated just below the soil surface (hemicryptophyte) and an almost leafless stalk growing directly from the ground (scapose). The fruits are oval, about 4 to 6 mm long and 3 to 4 mm wide, with narrow marginal ridges.

== Distribution ==
This plant is a sub-Mediterranean species widespread in southern and central Europe, from Spain, Italy and the Balkan Peninsula up to central Russia.

== Habitat ==
Peucedanum cervaria grows singly or in loose groups on light-rich, chalky, dry places, occasionally in semi-arid grassland, at an altitude of 0 to 1,200 metres (0 to 3,937 ft) above sea level.

== Gallery ==
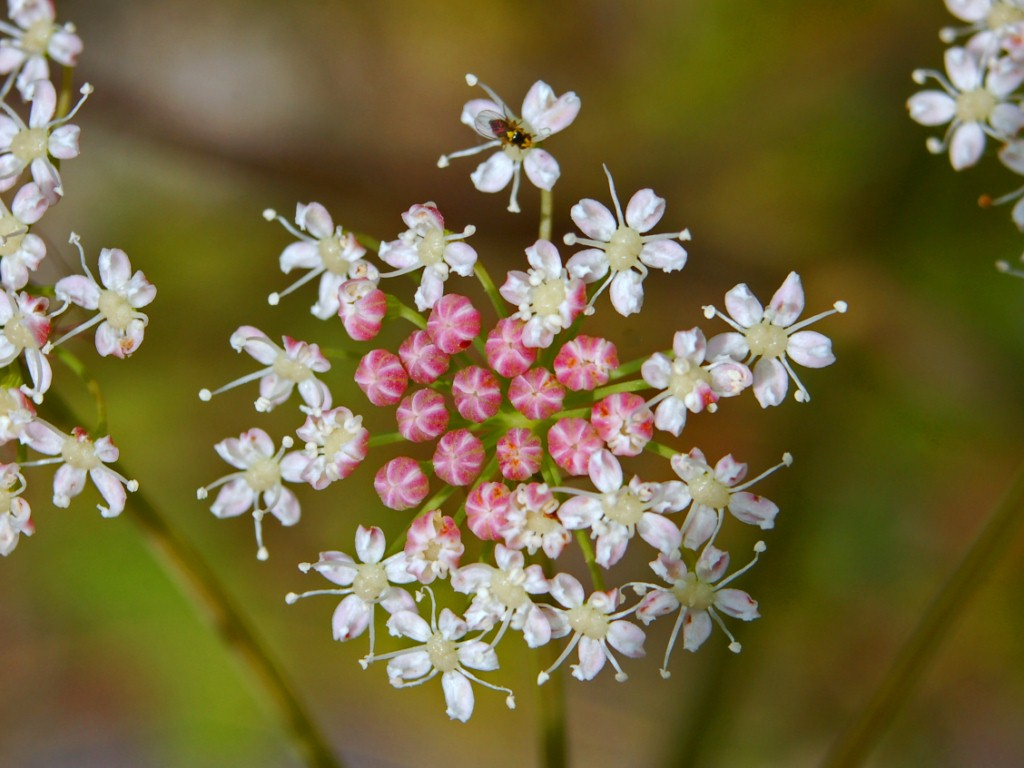
Close-up of flowers of Peucedanum cervaria

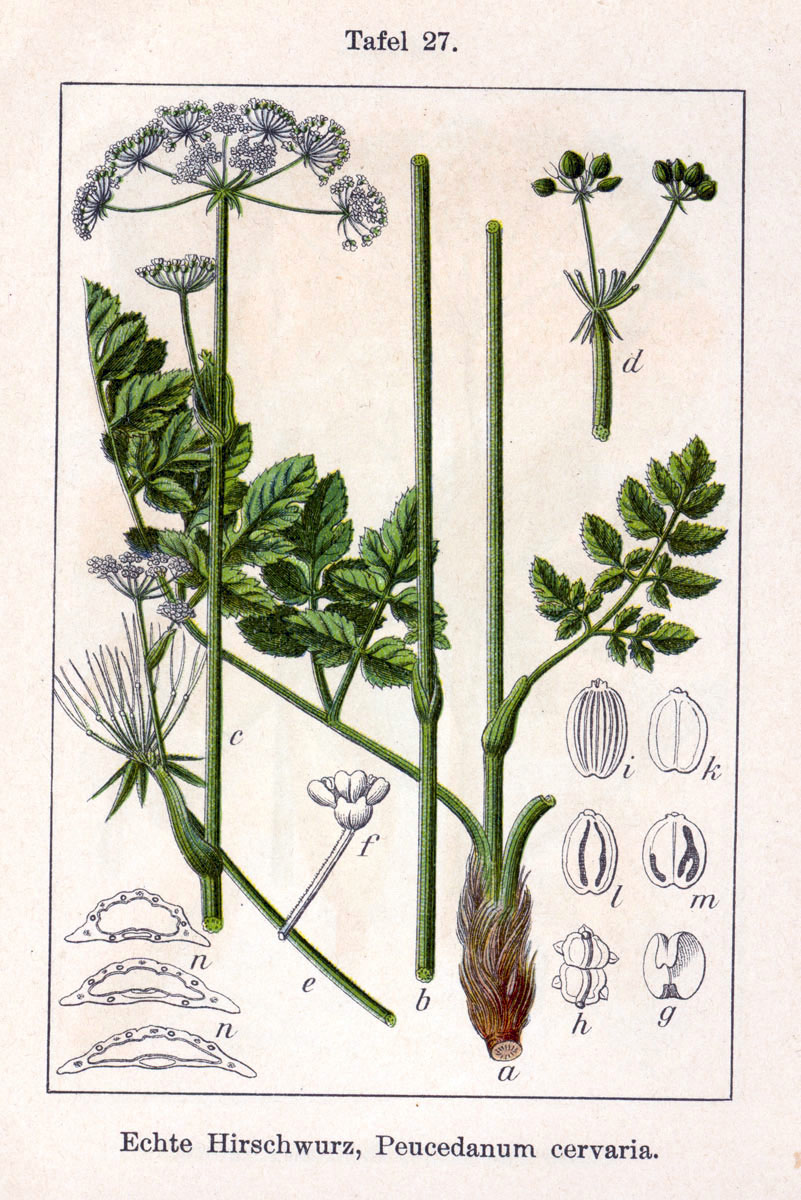
Image from Deutschlands Flora in Abbildungen, 1796

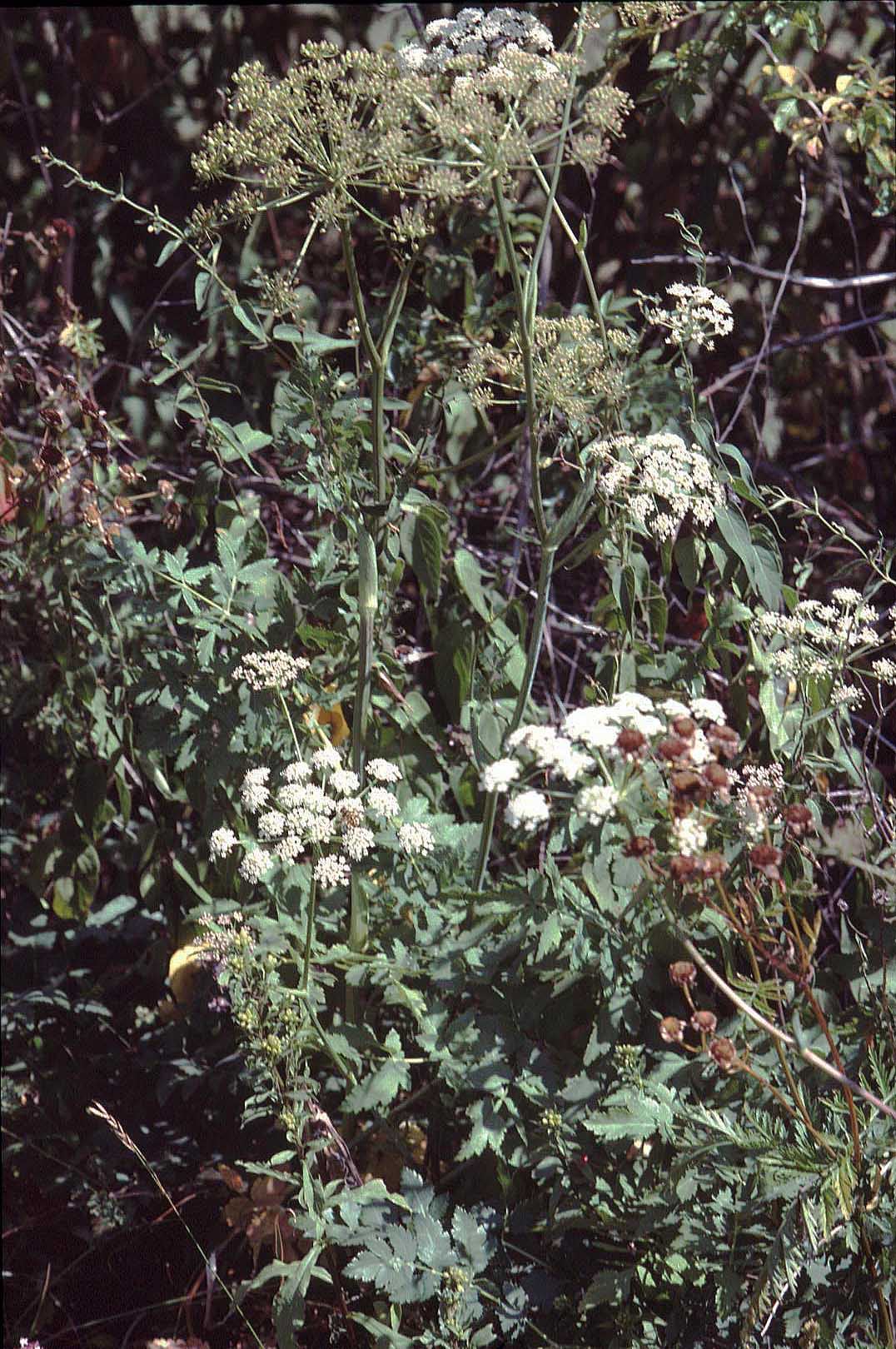
Plant of Peucedanum cervaria

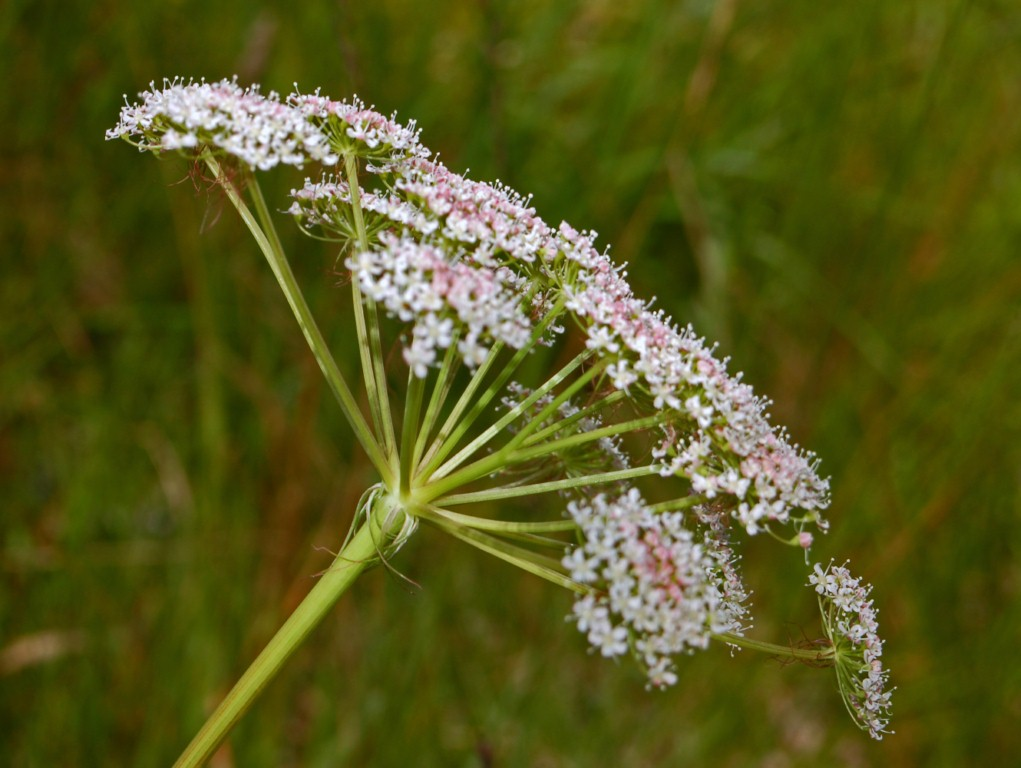
Umbel of Peucedanum cervaria, lateral view

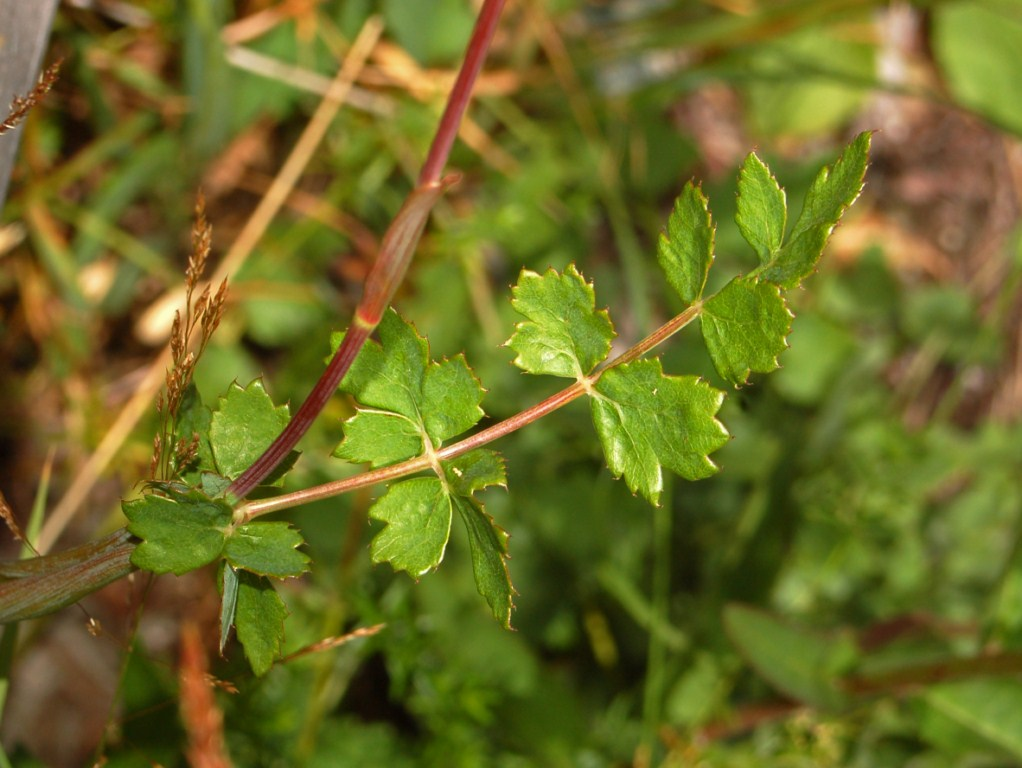
Leaves of Peucedanum cervaria
